= San Francisco Peninsula =

Peninsula in the San Francisco Bay Area

Coordinates: 37°35′00″N 122°24′04″W

Satellite photo of the San Francisco Bay Area. The San Francisco peninsula protrudes northward.

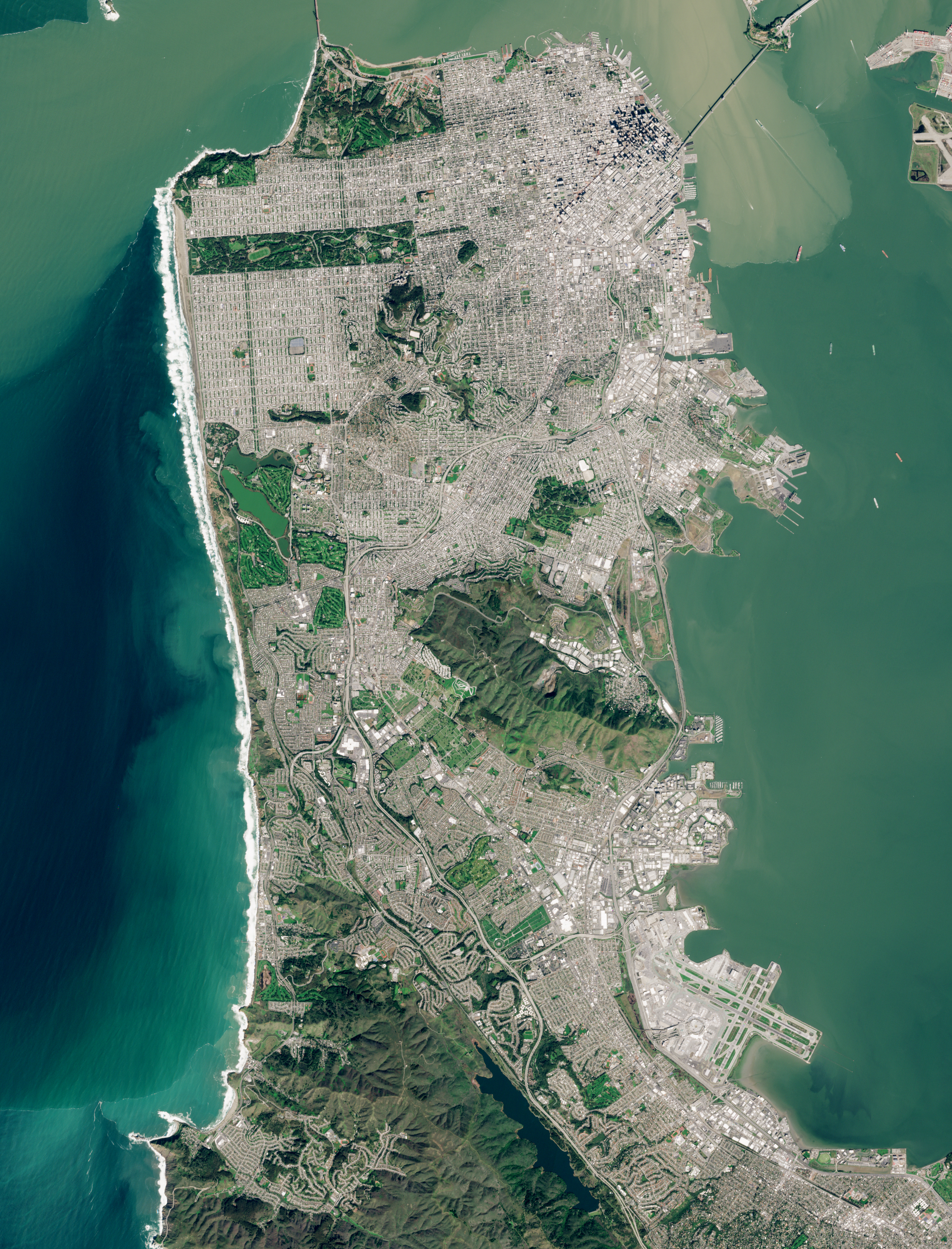
Tip of the San Francisco Peninsula. The city of San Francisco lies at the tip of the peninsula. San Francisco International Airport is visible in the bottom-right.

The San Francisco Peninsula is a geographic peninsula in the San Francisco Bay Area that separates San Francisco Bay from the Pacific Ocean. On its northern tip is the City and County of San Francisco. Its southern base is in northwestern Santa Clara County. Most of the Peninsula is occupied by San Mateo County, which is between San Francisco and Santa Clara counties.

Whereas the term peninsula in a geographical sense denotes the entire San Francisco Peninsula, in local jargon, "The Peninsula" is also the name of a subregion of the Bay Area separate from the city of San Francisco. It includes the San Mateo County cities of Atherton, Belmont, Brisbane, Burlingame, Colma, Daly City, East Palo Alto, El Granada, Foster City, Half Moon Bay, Hillsborough, La Honda, Loma Mar, Menlo Park, Millbrae, Pacifica, Pescadero, Portola Valley, Redwood City, Redwood Shores, San Bruno, San Carlos, San Mateo, South San Francisco, West Menlo Park and Woodside. Some definitions of the Peninsula subregion also include the Santa Clara County cities of Los Altos, Los Altos Hills, Mountain View, and Palo Alto.

== History ==
In 1795, Governor Diego de Borica gave José Darío Argüello a Spanish land grant known as Rancho de las Pulgas. This rancho was the largest grant on the peninsula consisting of 35,260 acres (142.7 km^{2}).

As a local geographic term, the area referred to as "the Peninsula" is distinct from that denoted by "the City", and refers to the portion south of San Francisco. The appellation may date to the period prior to 1856, when the City of San Francisco and the County of San Francisco were separate entities, the latter then coextensive with contemporary San Mateo County and San Francisco City-County. The City-County owns several disjunct properties along the whole of the Peninsula (mostly water pumping stations connected to the Hetch Hetchy Valley on which San Francisco has a permanent leasehold) – thus, most of the larger communities in San Mateo County are de facto suburbs of San Francisco, with the neighboring communities of Pacifica, Daly City, Broadmoor, Colma, South San Francisco, Half Moon Bay, San Bruno, and Brisbane being immediate suburbs. The remaining suburban area of the Peninsula is on the east side of the Santa Cruz Mountains, along San Francisco Bay; the west and south-central portions of the Peninsula are mostly rural, unincorporated, and unorganized areas.

A substantial portion of Silicon Valley is located on the peninsula. In Silicon Valley are the headquarters of some of the largest tech companies in the world, such as Google, Yahoo, Facebook, and Apple. Since 2010, droughts and wildfires have increased in frequency and become less seasonal and more year-round, further straining the region's water security.

== Geography and transportation ==
Along the center line of the Peninsula is the northern half of the Santa Cruz Mountains, formed by the action of plate tectonics along the San Andreas Fault. In the middle of the Peninsula along the fault is the Crystal Springs Reservoir. Just north of the Crystal Springs reservoir is San Andreas Lake, after which the geologic fault was originally named.

The east side of the peninsula is a densely populated and largely urban and suburban area that includes portions of Silicon Valley. It forms a commuter area between San Francisco to the north and San Jose to the south.

=== Roads ===
- Interstate 80
- Interstate 280
- Interstate 380
- U.S. Route 101
- State Route 1
- State Route 9
- State Route 35
- State Route 82
- State Route 84
- State Route 85
- State Route 92
- State Route 109
- State Route 114
- State Route 237

The bridges in the Peninsula include the Dumbarton Bridge, the Golden Gate Bridge, the San Francisco - Oakland Bay Bridge, and the San Mateo–Hayward Bridge.

A number of major thoroughfares run north-south: El Camino Real (SR 82) and US 101 on the east side along the bay, Interstate 280 down the center, Skyline Boulevard (SR 35) along the crest of the Santa Cruz Mountains, and SR 1 on the west along the Pacific, and SR 85 which forms the southern end of the Peninsula.

=== Transit ===
Caltrain is the primary passenger rail transit in the peninsula, serving much of the eastern urbanized areas of the peninsula between Mountain View (which also connects to VTA light rail) and San Francisco's 4th and King Street station. In addition, the peninsula has access to Bay Area Rapid Transit (BART) northward of Millbrae, connecting San Mateo County and San Francisco to the East Bay through a route over and under Daly City, Glen Park, San Francisco's Mission district, and through part of Market Street subway.

Bus service is predominantly provided by SamTrans and the SFMTA's Muni buses, which primarily run in San Mateo and San Francisco counties respectively. In addition, southward of Palo Alto, the Santa Clara Valley Transportation Authority operates buses to other parts of Santa Clara County. Most of the peninsula's bus transit to the East Bay and North Bay flowing through San Francisco, as neither AC Transit nor Golden Gate Transit, the primary transit operators for the East and North Bay respectively, serve the peninsula south of San Francisco.

=== Airports ===
The peninsula's largest commercial airport is San Francisco International Airport, itself connected to US 101 and BART and accessible to Caltrain (via a BART connection at Milbrae station).

San Jose International Airport, is the next largest airport in the region serving and might be a more viable option for the southern peninsula. The airport is connected to US 101 and there is a single connector bus, VTA Line 60, that links to Caltrain (at Santa Clara Transit Center) and to eastern lines of BART (Milpitas).

Oakland San Francisco International Airport, located in the East Bay, is the smallest of the three and is also accessible directly via BART.

== Environmental features ==
The San Francisco Peninsula contains a variety of habitats including estuarine, marine, oak woodland, redwood forest, coastal scrub and oak savanna. There are numerous species of wildlife present, especially along the San Francisco Bay estuarine shoreline, San Bruno Mountain, Fitzgerald Marine Reserve and the forests on the Montara Mountain block.

The area is home to several endangered species including the San Francisco garter snake, the Mission blue butterfly and the San Bruno elfin butterfly, all of which are endemic to San Mateo County. The endangered California clapper rail is also found on the shores of San Francisco Bay, in the cities of Belmont and San Mateo.

Although tule elk, an elk subspecies found only in California, were historically native to the San Francisco Peninsula, they were hunted to extinction by 1850. Expansion of Diablo Range elk to western Santa Clara County, and San Mateo and Santa Cruz Counties has been blocked by U.S. Highway 101 in Coyote Valley south of San Jose, California.

A number of noteworthy parks and nature preserves are found on the San Francisco Peninsula, including:

- Edgewood Park, San Mateo County
- Golden Gate National Recreation Area—several units are located on the Peninsula
- Midpeninsula Regional Open Space District—several preserves
- Shoreline Park, Mountain View, Santa Clara County

== Notable structures ==
There are a number of well-known structures and complexes on the San Francisco Peninsula:

- Bay Meadows Racecourse, San Mateo (demolished in 2008)
- Carolands Mansion, Hillsborough
- Cow Palace, Daly City
- Crocker Mansion, Hillsborough
- Crystal Springs Reservoir, west of Interstate 280
- CuriOdyssey museum, San Mateo
- Dakin Building, Brisbane
- Meta Platforms, world headquarters, Menlo Park
- Filoli mansion and gardens, Woodside
- Frenchman's Tower, Palo Alto
- Google Inc., World Headquarters, Mountain View
- "The Flintstone House", east side of Interstate 280
- Notre Dame de Namur University, Belmont, with Ralston Hall
- Oracle World Headquarters, Redwood Shores (aka the "Emerald City")
- Pulgas Water Temple, Woodside
- San Francisco International Airport
- Sanchez Adobe Park, Pacifica
- Stanford University campus, Palo Alto

== See also ==
- Landforms of the San Francisco Bay Area
- List of peninsulas
- Peninsulas of California
