= Rich May Memorial Field =

Artificial turf athletic field in California

- Location: 1425 Bay Road, East Palo Alto, California 94303, U.S.
- Operator: Rich May Foundation
- Surface: Artificial turf

Construction
- Opened: 2016

Website
- richmayfoundation.org

Rich May Memorial Field is an all-weather, lighted artificial turf athletic facility located at 1425 Bay Road, East Palo Alto, California 94303. The field is operated by the Rich May Foundation and is named in memory of East Palo Alto Police Officer Rich May, killed in the line of duty on January 7, 2006.

== History ==
The Rich May Foundation was established following Officer May's death in 2006 with the goal of building a youth athletic facility in East Palo Alto. The foundation partnered with St. Francis of Assisi Catholic Church and the Ravenswood City School District and, for four years, attempted to secure land for the project.

The East Palo Alto Planning Commission approved the project 4–1 in November 2010 after a two-hour hearing. The East Palo Alto City Council subsequently approved the building permit by a 3–2 vote in February 2011. Construction began in 2015 and the field became operational in 2016; lights were installed in 2018.

== Sports and programming ==
The field hosts soccer, rugby, football, and tennis programs. By 2025, daily attendance had grown to approximately 700 young people. The field is available for rental at $50 per hour.

== Notable players ==
- Folau Niua — two-time United States Olympic rugby representative with 387 international caps
- Vita Vea — Tampa Bay Buccaneers defensive tackle and Super Bowl champion

== See also ==
- East Palo Alto, California
- Anne Cribbs
- Vita Vea
- Folau Niua
