= Tinsley Voluntary Transfer Program =

1985 settlement of a lawsuit

The Tinsley Voluntary Transfer Program is a 1985 settlement of a lawsuit in which school districts surrounding the Ravenswood City School District in East Palo Alto, California agreed to accept up to 135 minority students entering grades Kindergarten through second grade from within the boundaries of the Ravenswood City School District. The surrounding school districts accepting transfer students under this settlement include:

- Palo Alto Unified School District: up to 60 students each year
- San Carlos School District: up to 26 students each year
- Menlo Park City School District: up to 24 students each year
- Las Lomitas Elementary School District: up to 12 students each year
- Portola Valley Elementary School District: up to 8 students each year
- Woodside Elementary School District: up to 5 students each year

Additionally, the Redwood City School District and the Belmont – Redwood Shores School District were at one time part of the settlement. They dropped out since their ratio of minority students has climbed over the 60 percent threshold mandated by the settlement. There is a reverse component to the settlement, in which non-minority students in the above listed districts can transfer in to the Ravenswood City School District in East Palo Alto. The Redwood City School District and the Belmont-Redwood Shores School District continue to participate in the reverse transfer portion of the settlement.

Once transferred, a student can continue to attend schools in the transferred district until graduation from high school, as long as the student lives within the Ravenswood City School District boundary. If a school district receives more applications for transfer than there are open slots, students are chosen by a lottery. The program is administered by the San Mateo County Office of Education, even though the Palo Alto Unified School District is located in Santa Clara County. The office assigns students to districts (applying students can indicate a choice of districts), and the district assigns the transfer student to a particular school.

The settlement came after almost ten years of litigation, and it is named after Margaret Tinsley, mother of Valarie Tinsley. Margaret Tinsley was the lead plaintiff out of one hundred and seventy (including parents and students) plaintiffs in the lawsuit. The plaintiffs claimed that the quality of education in schools within the Ravenswood City School District, which has a high percentage of minority students, was not equal to that in schools in surrounding districts with a low percentage of minority students.

== Notable graduates ==
- Laura Martinez, Palo Alto High School class of 2002, Mayor of East Palo Alto (2012 and 2014)
