= Bay Tunnel =

SF Bay water tunnel

- Location within San Francisco Bay Area Location within California

Overview
- Other name: Bay Division Pipeline Reliability Upgrade Project tunnel
- Location: South of the Dumbarton Bridge
- Coordinates: 37.4852175°N 122.1322745°W (Ravenswood shaft; west portal)
- Status: Active
- Crosses: San Francisco Bay
- Start: Newark, California
- End: Ravenswood, Menlo Park, California

Operation
- Work began: April 2010
- Opened: October 2015
- Character: water tunnel

Technical
- Length: 5 miles (8.0 km) long
- Tunnel clearance: 9 feet (2.7 m) diameter

The Bay Tunnel is a 5-mile-long (8.0 km), 9-foot diameter (2.7 m) utility tunnel from Newark to Menlo Park. It is the first bored tunnel under the San Francisco Bay. As part of the Hetch Hetchy water system, the tunnel carries drinking water for the City and County of San Francisco and is owned and operated by the San Francisco Public Utilities Commission.

== Background ==
After reaching the Bay Area, the Hetch Hetchy aqueduct split into four pipelines which all cross the Hayward fault. Pipelines 1 and 2 cross the San Francisco Bay to the south of the Dumbarton Bridge, partially upon a 1920s-era bridge and partially upon the Bay floor. Pipelines 3 and 4 run around the south of the bay. The four pipelines were built between 1925 and 1973.

By 2009, pipelines 1 and 2 across the bay leaked badly, causing plants to grow at the seams. The pipelines were also vulnerable to rupture due to earthquakes. However modern federal environmental laws made accessing and maintaining the pipeline difficult.

== Construction ==
The Bay Tunnel replaces the existing bay crossing of Bay Division Pipelines 1 and 2, and connects to a new Bay Division Pipeline 5. Construction began in April 2010, and the tunnel was finished on May 20, 2015 and began service in October 2015. The project finished on-time and under-budget at $218 million, down from the $313 million estimate.

Construction required digging two shafts; one to assemble and launch the tunnel boring machine, and one to receive and extract it. The launching shaft was dug next to the existing Ravenswood Valve House in Menlo Park, to a cylindrical diameter of 58 feet (18 m) and depth of 110 feet (34 m). During construction the tunnel featured a rail people-mover, overhead earth conveyor belt, and other utilities. Excavation rates reached up to 200 feet (61 m) per day. The receiving shaft was built in Newark to a cylindrical diameter of 28 feet (8.5 m) and depth of 74 feet (23 m). Ground freezing was used to prevent groundwater movement and avoid leakages during excavation of the receiving shaft. Fifty freeze pipes were installed to a depth of 127 feet (39 m) around the circumference of the shaft, and additional freeze pipes were installed through the center to freeze the bottom of the shaft.

The tunnel's construction is part of SFPUC's $4.6 billion Hetch Hetchy Water System Improvement Project which was a response to the 1989 Loma Prieta earthquake.
