= Menlo Park City School District =

Public school district in California, United States

Address
- 181 Encinal Avenue Atherton, California, 94027; United States
- Coordinates: 37°27.3′N 122°11.7′W

District information
- Type: Public
- Grades: K–8
- Superintendent: Kristen Gracia
- Budget: $70,318,227
- NCES District ID: 0624570

Students and staff
- Students: 2,710 (2021–2022)
- Teachers: 172.45 (FTE)
- Staff: 159.66 (FTE)
- Student–teacher ratio: 15.71:1

Other information
- Website: www.mpcsd.org

The Menlo Park City School District is a public school district in the San Francisco Bay Area, primarily serving the communities of Menlo Park and Atherton. Through the Tinsley Voluntary Transfer Program the district allows 24 students from Ravenswood City School District to attend MPCSD schools.

== Schools ==
=== Middle school ===
- Hillview Middle School (PTO Website, District School Website)

=== Elementary schools ===
- Oak Knoll School (K–5) ()
- Laurel School (K–5) (Website)
- Encinal School (K–5) (Website)
