= Eastside College Preparatory School =

Location
- 1041 Myrtle Street; East Palo Alto, CA 94303; United States; 37.463626°N 122.132178°W

Information
- Established: 1996
- Principal: Chris Bischof
- Grades: 9th–12th
- Gender: coeducational
- Campus type: suburban

Eastside College Preparatory School is a private high school in East Palo Alto, California, with a focus on readying first-generation students from low-income families to attend and succeed in 4-year colleges. It includes boarding facilities.

== School ==
Eastside College Preparatory School is independent and private, supported entirely by donations and grants; as of June 2009 it had approximately $80 million in property and cash endowments. Students are on full scholarships. The principal is Chris Bischof.

The school has a year-round calendar. Classes include several offerings in partnership with Foothill College, for which students can earn college credits. Teachers oversee a "Friday Night Homework" session for all students with unfinished assignments. Seniors complete a 25-page research thesis along with a 30-minute presentation. Starting in sophomore year, students take a college prep class and junior year students may tour colleges both on the East Coast and in Southern California. Many internships are available to graduates. An alumni team supports students' progress in college and as they transition to professional careers. The campus is open until 10:00 pm and on weekends.

Enrollment is currently 265. The school maintains a 99% college acceptance rate and 69% college completion rate, which is six times higher than the national average for first-generation college students.

== History ==
The school was founded in 1996 by Chris Bischof and Helen Kim, the vice principal, who met while students at Stanford University. It began with eight students who were taught at a picnic table in an East Palo Alto park, moving the next year to a house, then to offices, and finally to 1.6 acres of donated land where it was first housed in temporary buildings. The first class of eight all graduated in 2000, at which time enrollment was 70. The campus has grown to almost 6 acres.

Mathematics teacher Marianne Chowning-Dray received a Presidential Award for Excellence in Teaching in 2015.

== Student activities ==
Eastside College Preparatory School has athletics programs in basketball, soccer, volleyball, cross country, and track and field. The school newspaper is The Eastside Panther. The National Association for Urban Debate Leagues launched its Silicon Valley league in 2014 at Eastside and at Overfelt High School in East San Jose.
