= California State Route 109 =

Highway in California

State Route 109
- University Avenue
- SR 109 highlighted in red

Route information
- Maintained by Caltrans
- Length: 0.8 mi (1,300 m)

Major junctions
- South end: Notre Dame Avenue at the East Palo Alto–Menlo Park line
- North end: SR 84 in Menlo Park

Location
- Country: United States
- State: California
- Counties: San Mateo

Highway system
- State highways in California; Interstate; US; State; Scenic; History; Pre‑1964; Unconstructed; Deleted; Freeways
← SR 108	→ I-110

State Route 109 (SR 109) is a short, unsigned state highway in the U.S. state of California. It forms part of University Avenue in San Mateo County between U.S. Route 101 in East Palo Alto and State Route 84 in Menlo Park just west of the Dumbarton Bridge. However, the southern segment within East Palo Alto's borders between U.S. Route 101 and Notre Dame Avenue has never been transferred from the city's control to the California Department of Transportation (Caltrans). Although the route is unsigned, it may be noted on some online maps, including the southern segment still under East Palo Alto's control.

== Route description ==
The unsigned Route 109 is defined in section 409, subdivision (a), of the California Streets and Highways Code, and that the highway is "from Route 84 to Route 101".

SR 109 begins at U.S. Route 101 in East Palo Alto. It continues north until it reaches Notre Dame Avenue, where it then straddles along a north-south city border with Menlo Park. It then enters Menlo Park in its entirety and crosses an abandoned railroad crossing. SR 109 passes by salt evaporators before terminating at SR 84 just west of the Dumbarton Bridge.

The segment of SR 109 in East Palo Alto remains in local control, specifically from US 101 to Notre Dame Avenue. Section 409, subdivision (b) of the California Streets and Highways Code mandates that the state will not take control over this section until Caltrans and the city determine that it is in an "acceptable state of repair".

== History ==
In April 1958, I-109 was proposed as a name for the route that is now Interstate 280. This proposal was rejected by AASHTO.

The California State Route 109 designation was first defined in 1963, running from Sunset Cliffs Boulevard to Interstate 5 in San Diego. In 1972, that route was deleted and was renumbered as a western extension of Interstate 8.

Later in 1984, SR 109 was defined in its current incarnation as a route connecting East Palo Alto and SR 84. The segment in East Palo Alto between US 101 and Notre Dame Avenue remains in local control. Under Cal S&HC § 409 (b), the state will not take control over this section until both Caltrans and the city agree that it is in an "acceptable state of repair".

In 2001, a proposal was presented by the Metropolitan Transportation Commission to build a southern extension from the Dumbarton Bridge to the US 101/Oregon Expressway interchange in the City of Palo Alto. However, City of Palo Alto officials opposed the plan, citing the possible increased traffic, environmental concerns of building it near the Palo Alto Baylands, and noting that Cal S&HC § 409 (c) also mandates that "no study and analysis of any proposed segment of Route 109 shall be conducted without the involvement of the governing body of any city or county through which the segment would pass as an active participant in the study and analysis".

In 2023, the City of East Palo Alto applied for a San Mateo County Transportation Authority grant to study design improvements along the section of the route that it still controls. Named the University Avenue Grand Corridor Project, it proposes to instead make improvements to slow down traffic, make it safer for pedestrians, and cater the design to the desires of residents.

== Major intersections ==
Except where prefixed with a letter, postmiles were measured on the road as it was when the route was established, based on the alignment that existed at the time, and do not necessarily reflect current mileage. Postmile prefixes include: R reflecting a realignment in the route since then, M indicating a second realignment, L referring to an overlap due to a correction or change, and T indicating postmiles classified as temporary. Segments that remain unconstructed or have been relinquished to local control may be omitted. The entire route is in San Mateo County.

Location	Postmile	Destinations	Notes
East Palo Alto		University Avenue	Continuation beyond US 101
East Palo Alto		US 101 (Bayshore Freeway) – San Francisco, San Jose	Interchange; south end of SR 109; US 101 exit 403
East Palo Alto–Menlo Park line	1.10	Notre Dame Avenue	South end of state maintenance
Menlo Park	1.87	SR 84 (Bayfront Expressway) – Menlo Park, Dumbarton Bridge, Fremont	North end of SR 109
1.000 mi = 1.609 km; 1.000 km = 0.621 mi
