= Las Lomitas Elementary School District =

School district in California, United States

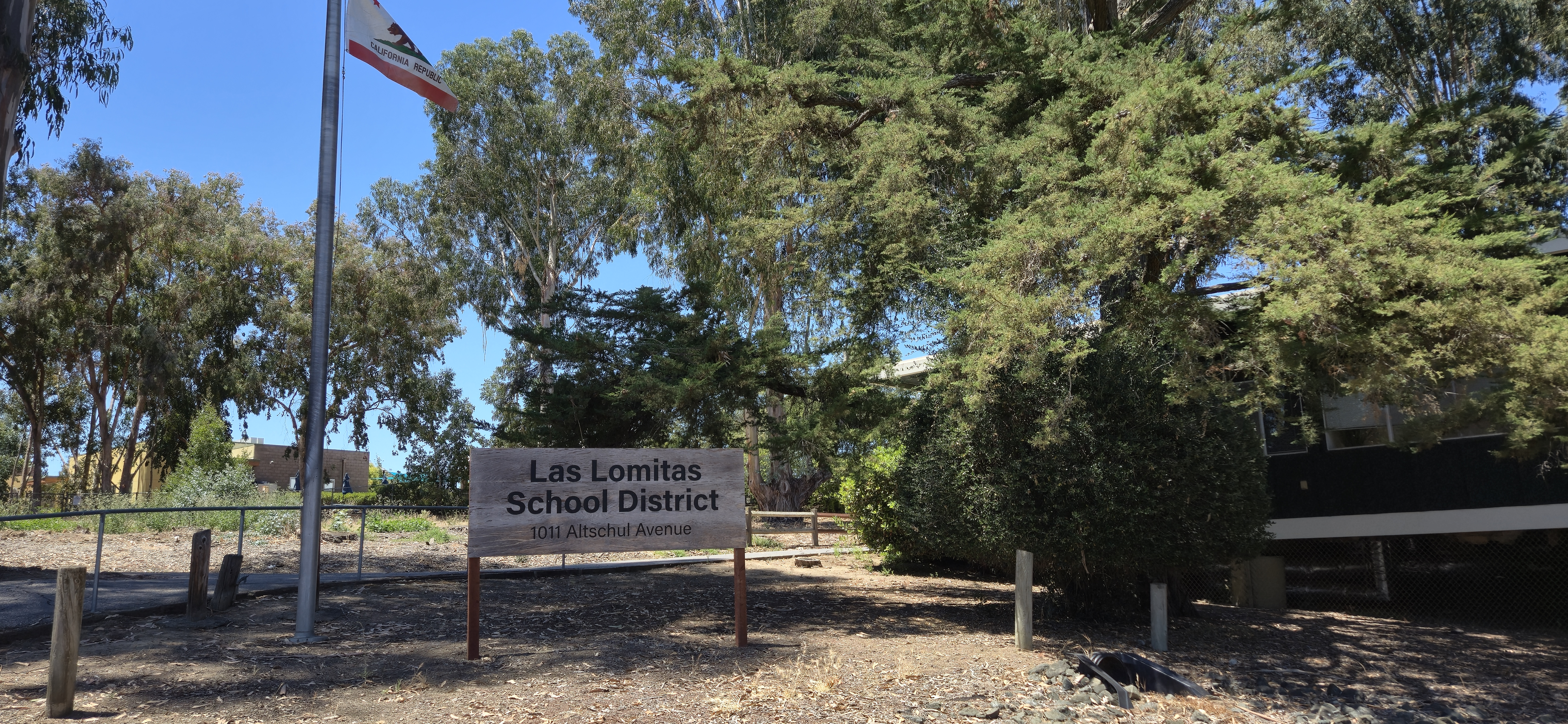

Address
- 1011 Altschul Avenue Menlo Park, California, 94025; United States

District information
- Type: Public
- Grades: K–8
- NCES District ID: 0622380

Students and staff
- Students: 1,116 (2020–2021)
- Teachers: 78.03 (FTE)
- Staff: 75.35 (FTE)
- Student–teacher ratio: 14.3:1

Other information
- Website: www.llesd.org

The Las Lomitas Elementary School District is a public school district in the San Francisco Bay Area, primarily serving parts of the communities of Menlo Park, Atherton and Ladera, with its headquarters in Menlo Park.

The district has two schools, with Las Lomitas Elementary School serving students from Transitional Kindergarten through 3rd grade, and La Entrada Middle School for grades 4 through 8.

For high school, students continue on to either area private schools or the Sequoia Union High School District, where most attend Menlo-Atherton High School, though some students opt for Woodside High School.

The district also owns the former La Loma School campus adjacent to La Entrada, currently rented to Phillips Brooks Academy, and the former Ladera School campus, a portion of which is currently rented to Woodland School, both private schools.

== District History ==
The district was formed in 1904, after the nearby Searsville school on Sand Hill Road closed in 1894. The first year of school ran from October 3, 1904 to June 16, 1905, with average attendance of 21 students, and total budget of $1,735.

The following school year started June 30, after only a two week summer break. Various discussions were held in the 1960s and 1970s about merging the district with nearby Menlo Park, but these were never finalized. Business services were shared with the Menlo Park City School District from 1978 to 2004.

=== District Name ===
Los Lomitas means little hills in Spanish, and refers to the small hills through the district.

== Schools ==
Elementary School

- Las Lomitas Elementary (K-3) - 485 students

Middle School

- La Entrada (4-8) - 745 students
