= California State Route 114 =

Highway in California

State Route 114
- Willow Road
- SR 114 highlighted in red

Route information
- Maintained by Caltrans
- Length: 0.926 mi (1,490 m)

Major junctions
- South end: US 101 in East Palo Alto
- North end: SR 84 in Menlo Park

Location
- Country: United States
- State: California
- Counties: San Mateo

Highway system
- State highways in California; Interstate; US; State; Scenic; History; Pre‑1964; Unconstructed; Deleted; Freeways
← SR 113	→ SR 115

State Route 114 (SR 114), better known by its street name Willow Road, is a short, unsigned state highway in the U.S. state of California. It runs in San Mateo County from U.S. Route 101 in East Palo Alto to State Route 84 in Menlo Park west of the Dumbarton Bridge.

SR 114 was originally planned to stretch to I-280, but that portion was never constructed and has since been deleted from the legislative definition.

== Route description ==
Route 114 is defined in section 414 of the California Streets and Highways Code, and that the highway is "from Route 101 in East Palo Alto to Route 84".

The route begins at U.S. Route 101 in East Palo Alto. From here, it heads north into Menlo Park. Here, it meets Hamilton Avenue and its north end at SR 84, which continues to the Dumbarton Bridge over the San Francisco Bay. The road itself continues into the headquarters of Meta.

== History ==
When defined in 1963, the route began at I-280 and ended at US 101. In 1984, a segment of SR 84 in the vicinity was swapped with SR 114, moving SR 114 from I-280 to SR 84, which followed Willow Road, as it does today. In 1990, however, the I-280 section was truncated and the terminus was switched to US 101.

== Major intersections ==
Except where prefixed with a letter, postmiles were measured on the road as it was in 1964, based on the alignment that existed at the time, and do not necessarily reflect current mileage. Postmile prefixes include: R reflecting a realignment in the route since then, M indicating a second realignment, L referring to an overlap due to a correction or change, and T indicating postmiles classified as temporary. Segments that remain unconstructed or have been relinquished to local control may be omitted. The entire route is in San Mateo County.

Location	Postmile	Destinations	Notes
East Palo Alto	5.00	Willow Road	Continuation beyond US 101
East Palo Alto	5.00	US 101 (Bayshore Freeway) – San Jose, San Francisco	Interchange; south end of SR 114; US 101 exit 404
Menlo Park	5.92	SR 84 (Bayfront Expressway) – Dumbarton Bridge, Fremont	North end of SR 114
1.000 mi = 1.609 km; 1.000 km = 0.621 mi
