= Dumbarton Bridge (California) =

Southernmost bridge crossing the San Francisco Bay

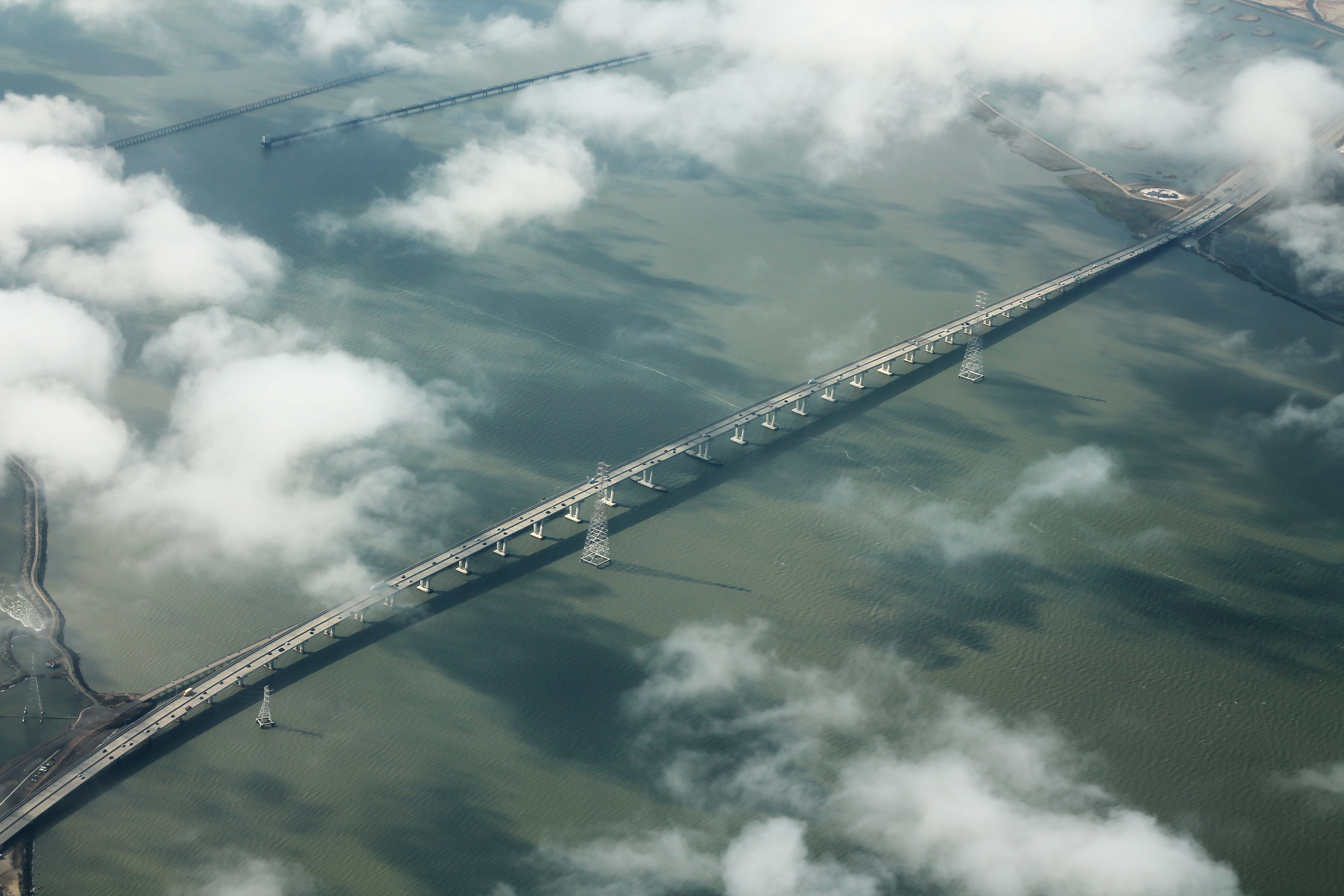
- Aerial view of the Dumbarton Bridge
- Coordinates: 37.5069°N 122.1169°W
- Carries: 6 lanes of SR 84; Bicycles and pedestrians
- Crosses: San Francisco Bay
- Locale: Menlo Park, California and Fremont, California
- Owner: State of California
- Maintained by: California Department of Transportation and the Bay Area Toll Authority
- ID number: 35 0038

Characteristics
- Design: Twin girder bridge
- Material: Concrete
- Total length: 2,621.28 meters (8,600.0 feet), 1.63 miles
- Longest span: 103.63 meters (340.0 feet)
- Clearance below: 25.91 meters (85.0 feet) (main span)

History
- Opened: January 17, 1927; 99 years ago (original span); October 1982; 44 years ago (current span)

Statistics
- Daily traffic: 70,000+ (auto); 118 (bike & pedestrian)
- Toll: Westbound only; FasTrak or pay-by-plate, cash not accepted; Effective January 1 – December 31, 2026: $8.50; $4.25 (carpool rush hours, FasTrak only)

Location
- Interactive map of Dumbarton Bridge

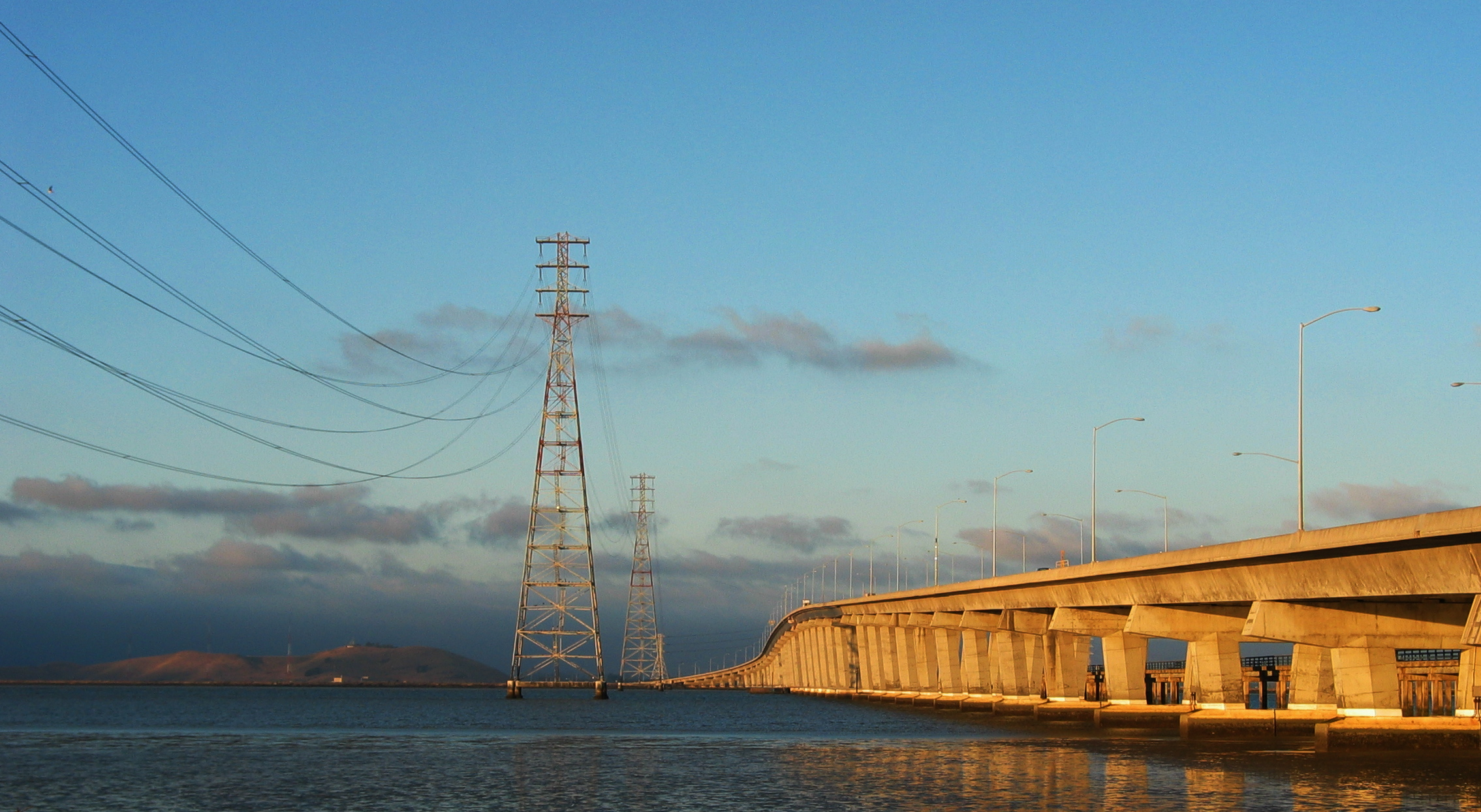
The Dumbarton Bridge and its adjacent powerline towers

The Dumbarton Bridge is the southernmost of the highway bridges across San Francisco Bay in California. Carrying over 70,000 vehicles and about 118 pedestrian and bicycle crossings daily (384 on weekends), it is the shortest bridge across San Francisco Bay at 1.63 miles (8,600 ft; 2,620 m). Its eastern end is in Fremont, near Newark in the San Francisco Bay National Wildlife Refuge, and its western end is in Menlo Park. Bridging State Route 84 across the bay, it has three lanes each way and a separated bike/pedestrian lane along its south side. As with the San Mateo–Hayward Bridge to the north, power lines parallel the bridge.

== History and engineering features ==
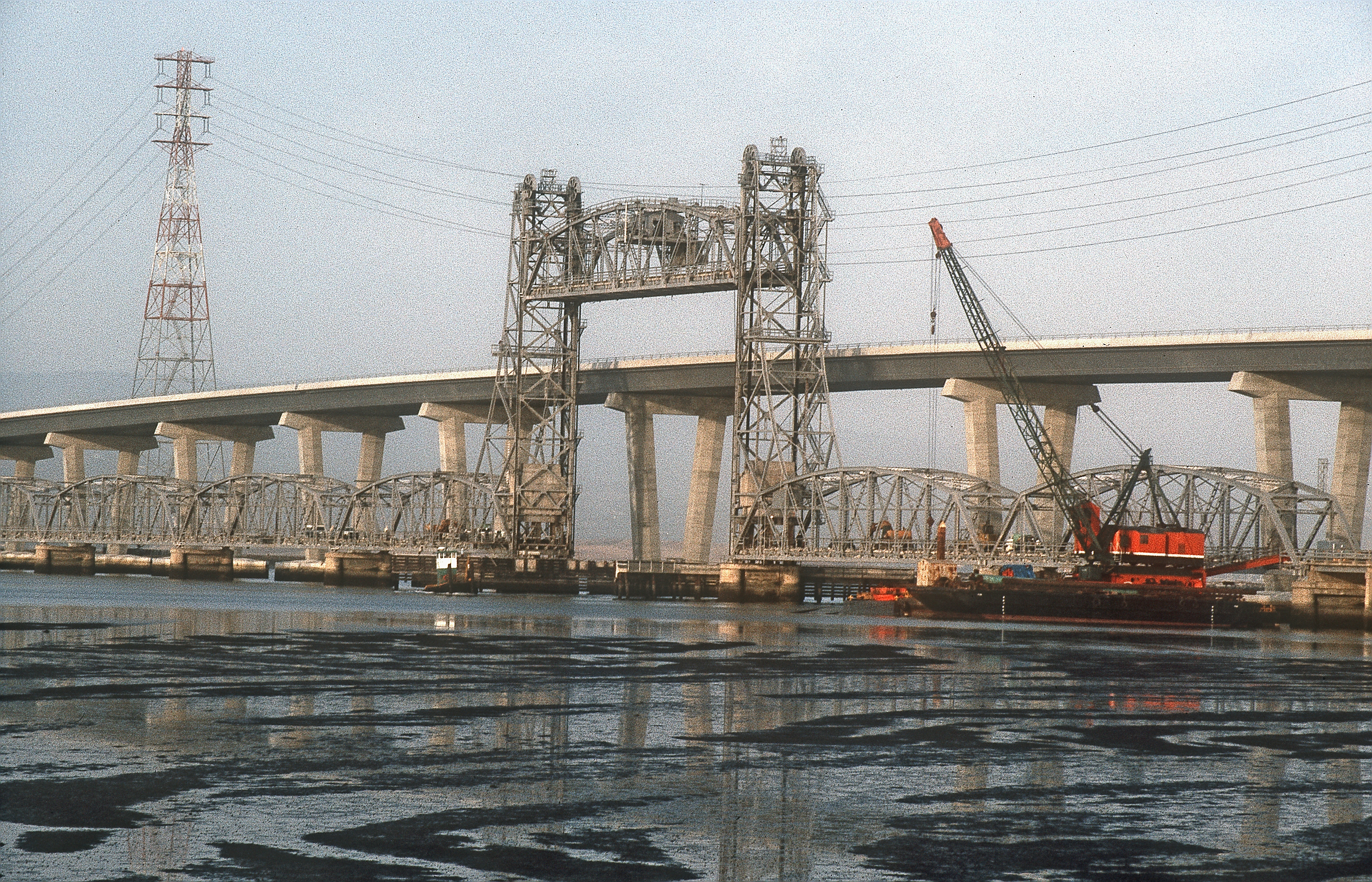
The original vertical-lift span of the Dumbarton Bridge, shown in 1984 shortly before it was demolished

The bridge has never been officially named, but its commonly used name comes from Dumbarton Point near the east end of the bridge, named in 1876 after Dumbarton, Scotland. Built originally to provide a shortcut for traffic originating in San Mateo and Santa Clara counties, the bridge served industrial and residential areas on both sides. The earlier bridge opened on January 17, 1927, and was the first vehicular bridge to cross San Francisco Bay. A portion of this old drawbridge remains as a fishing pier on the east side of the Bay. The original bridge was built with private capital and then purchased by the state for $2.5 million in 1951 (equivalent to $31.01 million in 2025).

Its age, and the two-lane undivided roadway and lift-span, led to a replacement bridge being built to the north. This bridge opened in October 1982 as a four-lane, high-level structure. The structure was re-striped to accommodate six lanes on October 18, 1989, in response to the temporary closing of the San Francisco–Oakland Bay Bridge due to the Loma Prieta earthquake, and the permanent widening of the approaches was completed by July 2003. The cost of the complete replacement project was $200 million (equivalent to $350.04 million in 2025). The current bridge includes a two-way bicycle and separate pedestrian path on the south-facing side. A 340 ft (104 m) center span provides 85 ft (26 m) of vertical clearance for shipping. The approach spans on both sides of the Bay are of pre-stressed lightweight concrete girders supporting a lightweight concrete deck. The center spans are twin steel trapezoidal girders which also support a lightweight concrete deck.

The center span of the original bridge was demolished in a controlled explosion in September 1984.

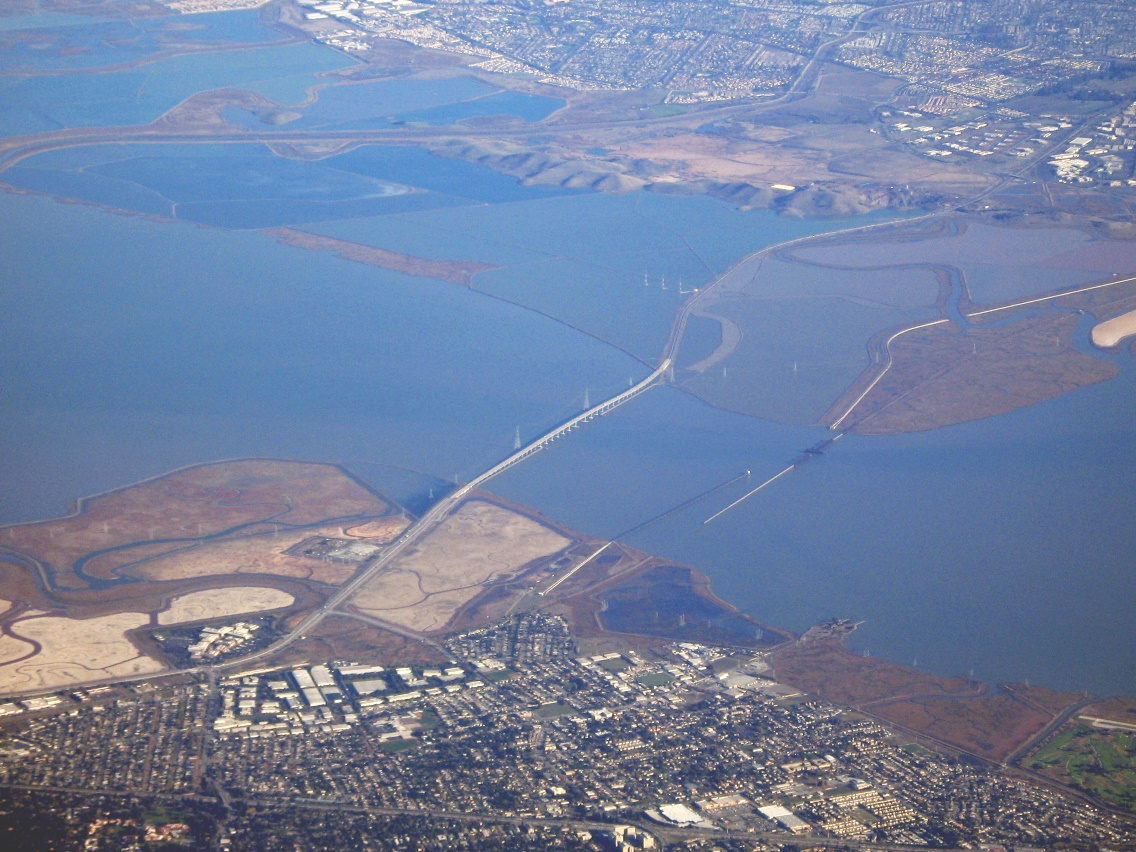
A view from the air, above Palo Alto, looking towards Fremont

== Roadway connections ==
The bridge is part of State Route 84, and is directly connected to Interstate 880 by a freeway segment north of the Fremont end. There is no freeway connection between U.S. 101 and the southwest end of the Dumbarton Bridge. Motorists must traverse one of three at-grade routes to connect from the Bayshore Freeway to the bridge. These are (from northwest to southeast):

1. the Bayfront Expressway, a limited-access road linking to U.S. 101 at Marsh Road, Atherton (the official routing of SR 84)
2. Willow Road (SR 114), an approximately one-mile expressway through east Menlo Park to U.S. 101
3. University Avenue (SR 109), an arterial road and the main commercial street of East Palo Alto.

The Willow Road and University Avenue junctions with Bayfront Expressway are at-grade intersections controlled by traffic lights; there are two additional controlled intersections at Chilco Road and Marsh Road, and the Marsh Road interchange on U.S. 101 is a parclo. The result is that Bayfront Expressway is frequently congested, and when not congested is often the site of high-speed car crashes. In 2007, author David Halberstam was killed in one such crash at the Willow Road intersection.

Access to I-280 is available via State Route 84 to Woodside Road (as signed) or other arterial routes. There are no cross-Peninsula freeway connections between State Routes 92 and 84. In addition, there are no direct cross-Peninsula arterial routes between State Route 84 and Page Mill Road, a five-mile gap.

Although the present situation has resulted in severe traffic problems on the bridge itself and in Menlo Park and East Palo Alto, Caltrans has been unable to upgrade the relevant portion of Highway 84 to freeway standards for several decades, due to opposition from the cities of Menlo Park, Atherton and Palo Alto. Freeway opponents fear that upgrading Highway 84 will encourage more people to live in southern Alameda County (where housing is more affordable) and commute to jobs in the mid-Peninsula area (where businesses wish to be located in order to be close to Silicon Valley), thus increasing traffic in their neighborhoods to the south and west of U.S. 101 and even along State Routes 85 and 237.

Bus service across the bridge is provided by the Dumbarton Express, run by a consortium of local transit agencies (SamTrans, AC Transit, VTA and others) which connects to BART at Union City and Caltrain at Palo Alto and California Avenue. AC Transit also runs Transbay buses U (Fremont BART and Amtrak to Stanford) and DA (Ardenwood to Oracle and Facebook headquarters) across the bridge. The free Stanford Marguerite Shuttle also runs buses AE-F and EB across the bridge.

== Environmental factors ==
When the current bridge was planned in the 1970s, Caltrans conducted extensive environmental research on the aquatic and terrestrial environment. Principal concerns of the public were air pollution and noise pollution impacts, particularly in some residential areas of Menlo Park and East Palo Alto. Studies were conducted to produce contour maps of projected sound levels and carbon monoxide concentrations throughout the western approaches, for each alternative connection scheme.

The area around the bridge is an important ecological area, hosting many species of birds, fish and mammals. The endangered species California clapper rail is known to be present in the western bridge terminus area.

Near the bridge on the Peninsula are Menlo Park's Bayfront Park, East Palo Alto's Ravenswood Open Space Preserve, and the Palo Alto Baylands Nature Preserve. An accessible portion of the San Francisco Bay National Wildlife Refuge lies immediately north of the western bridge terminus, where the Ravenswood trail runs.

On both sides of the east end of the bridge are large salt ponds and levee trails belonging to the Don Edwards San Francisco Bay National Wildlife Refuge. The headquarters and visitor center for the refuge is on a hill south of the bridge approach. North of the east end of the bridge is Coyote Hills Regional Park, with its network of trails running over tall hills. North of that is the Alameda Creek Regional Trail from the Bay to Niles Canyon. East of Coyote Hills is Ardenwood Historic Farm, a restored working farm that preserves and displays turn-of-the-century farming methods

== Tolls ==
Tolls are only collected from westbound traffic headed to Menlo Park at the toll plaza on the Fremont side of the bay. All-electronic tolling has been in effect since 2020, and drivers may either pay using the FasTrak electronic toll collection device or using the license plate tolling program. It remains not truly an open road tolling system until the remaining unused toll booths are removed, forcing drivers to slow substantially from freeway speeds while passing through. Effective January 1 – December 31, 2026, the toll rate for passenger cars is $8.50. During peak traffic hours on weekdays between 5:00 am and 10:00 am, and between 3:00 pm and 7:00 pm, carpool vehicles carrying three or more people or motorcycles may pay a discounted toll of $4.25 if they use the designated carpool lane with a FasTrak Flex transponder with its switch set to indicate the number of the vehicle's occupants (1, 2, or 3+). Two-person carpools may still use the carpool lane but will still be charged the full toll. Drivers without Fastrak or a license plate account must open and pay via a "short term" account within 48 hours after crossing the bridge or they will be sent an invoice of the unpaid toll. No additional toll violation penalty will be assessed if the invoice is paid within 21 days.

=== Historical toll rates ===
Prior to 1969, tolls on the Dumbarton Bridge were collected in both directions. When it opened, the original 1927 span had a toll of $0.40 per car (equivalent to $7.41 in 2025) plus $0.05 per passenger (equivalent to $0.93 in 2025). In 1959, tolls were set to $0.35 per car (equivalent to $3.87 in 2025). It was raised to $0.70 in 1969 (equivalent to $6.15 in 2025), then $0.75 in 1976 (equivalent to $4.24 in 2025). The toll per car remained at $0.75 when the replacement bridge opened in 1982 (equivalent to $2.50 in 2025).

The basic toll (for automobiles) on the seven state-owned bridges, including the Dumbarton Bridge, was standardized to $1 by Regional Measure 1, approved by Bay Area voters in 1988 (equivalent to $2.72 in 2025). A $1 seismic retrofit surcharge was added in 1998 by the state legislature, increasing the toll to $2 (equivalent to $3.95 in 2025), originally for eight years, but since then extended to December 2037 (AB1171, October 2001). On March 2, 2004, voters approved Regional Measure 2 to fund various transportation improvement projects, raising the toll by another dollar to $3 (equivalent to $5.11 in 2025). An additional dollar was added to the toll starting January 1, 2007, to cover cost overruns on the eastern span replacement of the Bay Bridge, increasing the toll to $4 (equivalent to $6.21 in 2025).

The Metropolitan Transportation Commission (MTC), a regional transportation agency, in its capacity as the Bay Area Toll Authority, administers RM1 and RM2 funds, a significant portion of which are allocated to public transit capital improvements and operating subsidies in the transportation corridors served by the bridges. Caltrans administers the "second dollar" seismic surcharge, and receives some of the MTC-administered funds to perform other maintenance work on the bridges. The state legislature created the Bay Area Toll Authority in 1997 to transfer the toll administration of the seven state-owned bridges to the MTC. The Bay Area Toll Authority is made up of appointed officials put in place by various city and county governments, and is not subject to direct voter oversight.

Due to further funding shortages for seismic retrofit projects, the Bay Area Toll Authority again raised tolls on all seven of the state-owned bridges in July 2010. The toll rate for autos on the Dumbarton Bridge was thus increased to $5 (equivalent to $7.38 in 2025).

In June 2018, Bay Area voters approved Regional Measure 3 to further raise the tolls on all seven of the state-owned bridges to fund $4.5 billion worth of transportation improvements in the area. Under the passed measure, the toll rate for autos on the Dumbarton Bridge was increased to $6 on January 1, 2019; to $7 on January 1, 2022; and then to $8 on January 1, 2025.

In September 2019, the MTC approved a $4 million plan to eliminate toll takers and convert all seven of the state-owned bridges to all-electronic tolling, citing that 80 percent of drivers are now using Fastrak and the change would improve traffic flow. On March 20, 2020, accelerated by the COVID-19 pandemic, all-electronic tolling was placed in effect for all seven state-owned toll bridges. The MTC then installed new systems at all seven bridges to make them permanently cashless by the start of 2021. In April 2022, the Bay Area Toll Authority announced plans to remove all remaining unused toll booths and create an open-road tolling system which functions at highway speeds.

The Bay Area Toll Authority then approved a plan in December 2024 to implement 50-cent annual toll increases on all seven state-owned bridges between 2026 and 2030 to help pay for bridge maintenance. The standard toll rate for autos will thus rise to $8.50 on January 1, 2026; $9 in 2027; $9.50 in 2028; $10 in 2029; and then to $10.50 in 2030. And becoming effective in 2027, a 25-cent surcharge will be added to any toll charged to a license plate account, and a 50-cent surcharge added to a toll violation invoice, due to the added cost of processing these payment methods. The carpool lane rules will also be standardized across the toll bridges in 2026, with a minimum of three people required to qualify for the discount.

== Dumbarton Rail Bridge ==
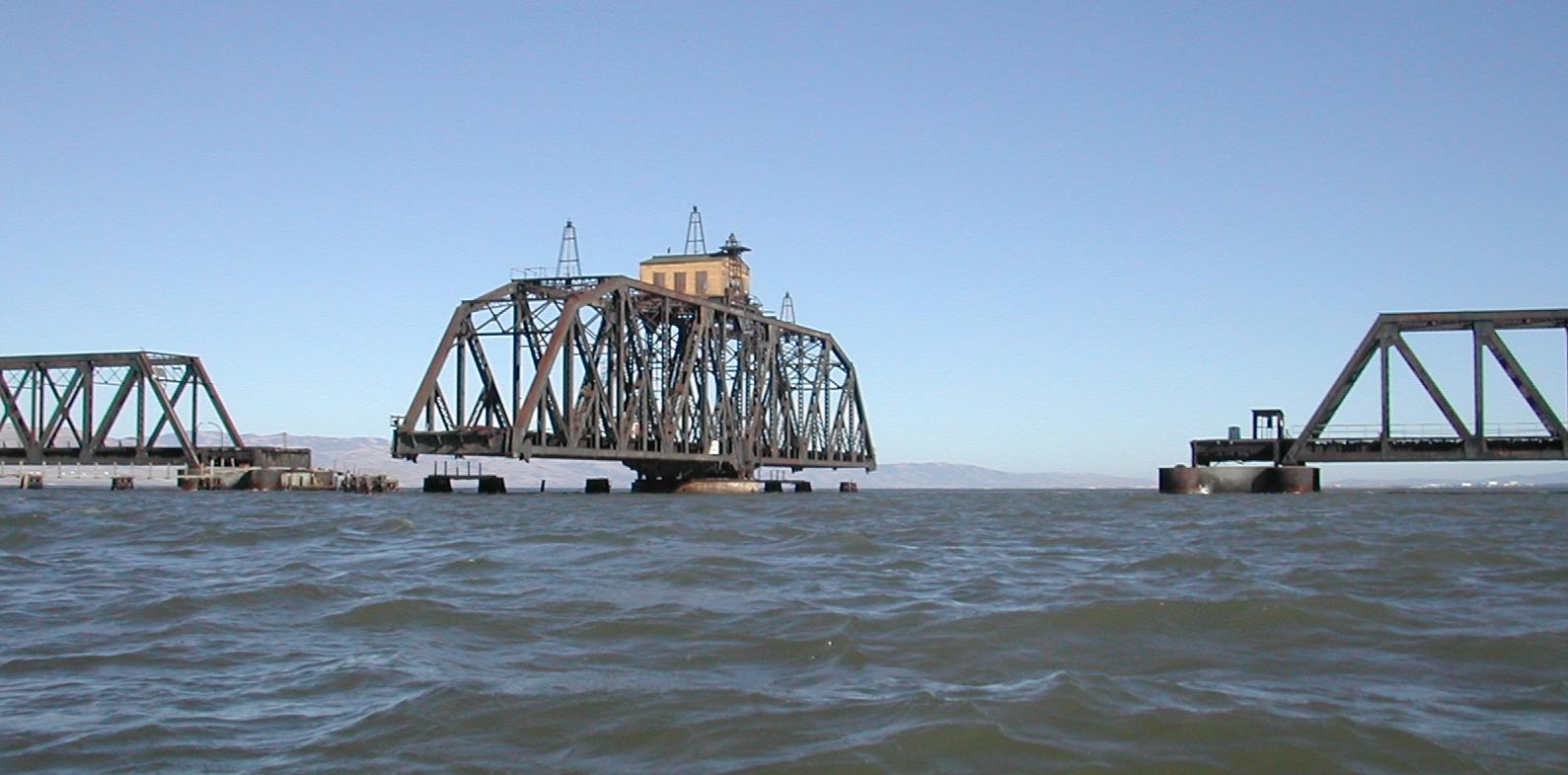
Dumbarton Rail Bridge in 2007, as seen from a kayak

Just to the south of the car bridge lies the Dumbarton Rail Bridge. Built in 1910, the rail bridge has been unused since 1982 and its western approach collapsed in a fire in 1998. When the bridge was in use, boaters would signal the operator, who would start a diesel engine and rotate the bridge to the open position on a large gear. The bridge is now left in the open position as shown. There are plans for a new rail bridge and rehabilitation of the rail line to serve a commuter rail service to connect Union City, Fremont, and Newark to various Peninsula destinations. A successful March 2004 regional transportation ballot measure included funding to rehabilitate the rail bridge for the commuter rail service, but in October 2008 the Metropolitan Transportation Commission transferred $91 million from this project to the BART Warm Springs extension in Fremont.

== Hetch Hetchy Aqueduct ==
Between the Dumbarton Bridge and the Dumbarton Rail Bridge is the Bay crossing of the Hetch Hetchy Aqueduct. The aqueduct rises above ground in Newark at the east side of the Bay, falls below the water's surface at a pump station in Fremont, re-emerges in the middle of the Bay and then continues above water until it reaches the west side of the Bay at Menlo Park.

== In popular culture ==
A scene of the 1971 movie Harold and Maude was filmed at the original toll plaza and showed Maude speeding and disobeying a police officer.
