= East Palo Alto, California =

City in California, United States

- City
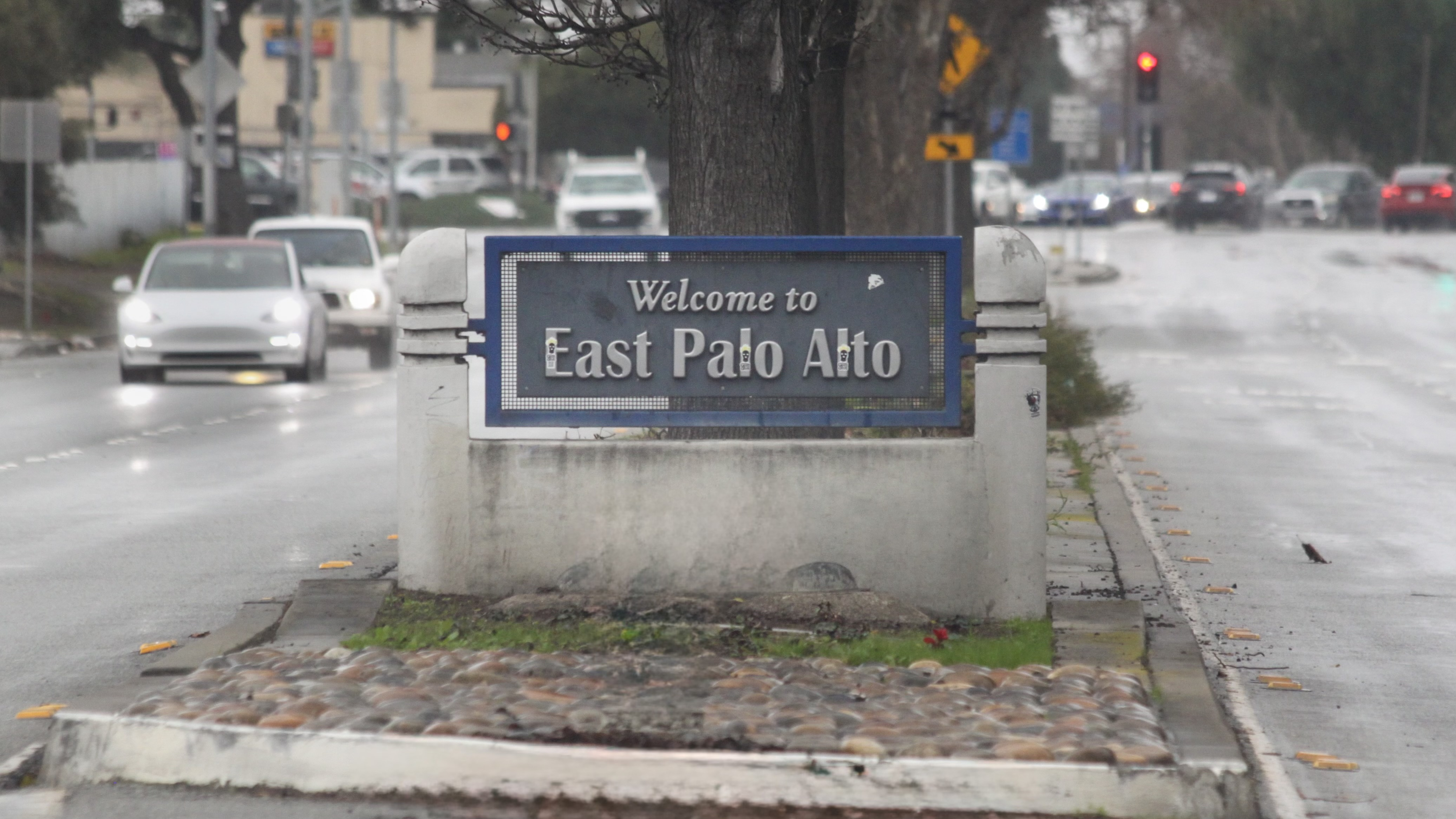
- Welcome to East Palo Alto sign on University Avenue in East Palo Alto.

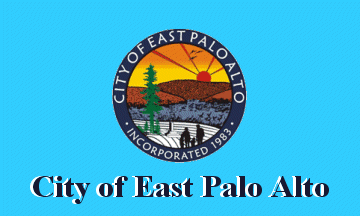
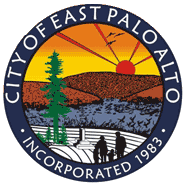
- Flag Seal
- Nickname: E.P.A.
- Interactive map of East Palo Alto, California
- Location in the United States
- Coordinates: 37°28′1″N 122°8′23″W
- Country: United States
- State: California
- County: San Mateo
- Incorporated: July 1, 1983
- Named for: El Palo Alto

Government
  - Mayor: Martha Barragan
  - Vice Mayor: Mark Dinan
  - Councilmember: Ruben Abrica
  - Councilmember: Carlos Romero
  - Councilmember: Webster Lincoln

Area
  - Total: 2.64 sq mi (6.85 km^{2})
  - Land: 2.53 sq mi (6.55 km^{2})
  - Water: 0.12 sq mi (0.30 km^{2}) 4.11%
- Elevation: 20 ft (6 m)

Population (2020)
  - Total: 30,034
  - Density: 11,900/sq mi (4,590/km^{2})
- Time zone: UTC-8 (PST)
  - Summer (DST): UTC-7 (PDT)
- ZIP code: 94303
- Area code: 650
- FIPS code: 06-20956
- GNIS feature ID: 1658461
- Website: www.cityofepa.org

East Palo Alto (/ˈiːst ˌpæloʊ ˈæltoʊ/ EAST PAL-oh AL-toh; abbreviated E.P.A.) is a city in San Mateo County, California, United States. As of the 2020 census, the population of East Palo Alto was 30,034. It is situated on the San Francisco Peninsula, roughly halfway between the cities of San Francisco and San Jose. To the north and east is the San Francisco Bay, to the west is the city of Menlo Park, and to the south the city of Palo Alto. East Palo Alto was founded as an unincorporated community and was incorporated in July 1983. The two cities are separated only by San Francisquito Creek and, largely, the Bayshore Freeway (the vast majority of East Palo Alto is northeast of the freeway, while all of the residential part of Palo Alto is southwest of the freeway). The revitalization projects in 2000, and high income high-tech professionals moving into new developments, including employees from Google and Facebook, have begun to slowly eliminate the historically wide cultural and economic differences between the two cities. East Palo Alto and Palo Alto share both telephone area codes and postal ZIP codes.

In 1990, 43% of East Palo Alto's residents were African Americans, which was the result of redlining practices and racial deed restrictions in Palo Alto, while 34% were Latinos. As of 2020, African Americans were 11%, while Latinos are about 66%. A small minority of Pacific Islanders also reside in East Palo Alto, most of Tongan, Samoan, and Fijian origin.

The prosperity that benefited Silicon Valley during the dot-com boom of the late 1990s largely bypassed East Palo Alto. The Ravenswood City School District, which serves East Palo Alto and part of adjoining Menlo Park, has struggled with low academic performance. Eventually, however, the Peninsula's shortage of land and soaring property prices meant that East Palo Alto became an option for urban regeneration.

East Palo Alto includes a small piece of land southwest of the Bayshore Freeway (U.S. Route 101), across the freeway from the Gateway 101 shopping center. This land is roughly triangular and sits between the freeway and San Francisquito Creek. This land was formerly the site of a two-block-long retail business district known as Whiskey Gulch. Since 1888, Stanford University, on the west side of Palo Alto, prohibited alcohol sales within a radius of 1.5-mile (2.4 km) from the campus. Whiskey Gulch, which was just outside these limits, became home to a number of liquor stores, bars, and music venues. The rules were relaxed in 1970, but the neighborhood still retained this character until 2000, when the city tore down Whiskey Gulch and replaced it with the University Circle office complex. A 200-room Four Seasons hotel opened in University Circle in 2006.

Over 25% of East Palo Alto (400+ acres) has been bulldozed and replaced with brand new housing and brand-name retail establishments since approximately 1997, attracting an entirely new demographic. The University Square community has become particularly appealing to young high-tech professionals and high-income couples, including many employees from Google, Facebook, Sun Microsystems, Yahoo!, and various other software and startup companies.

== History ==
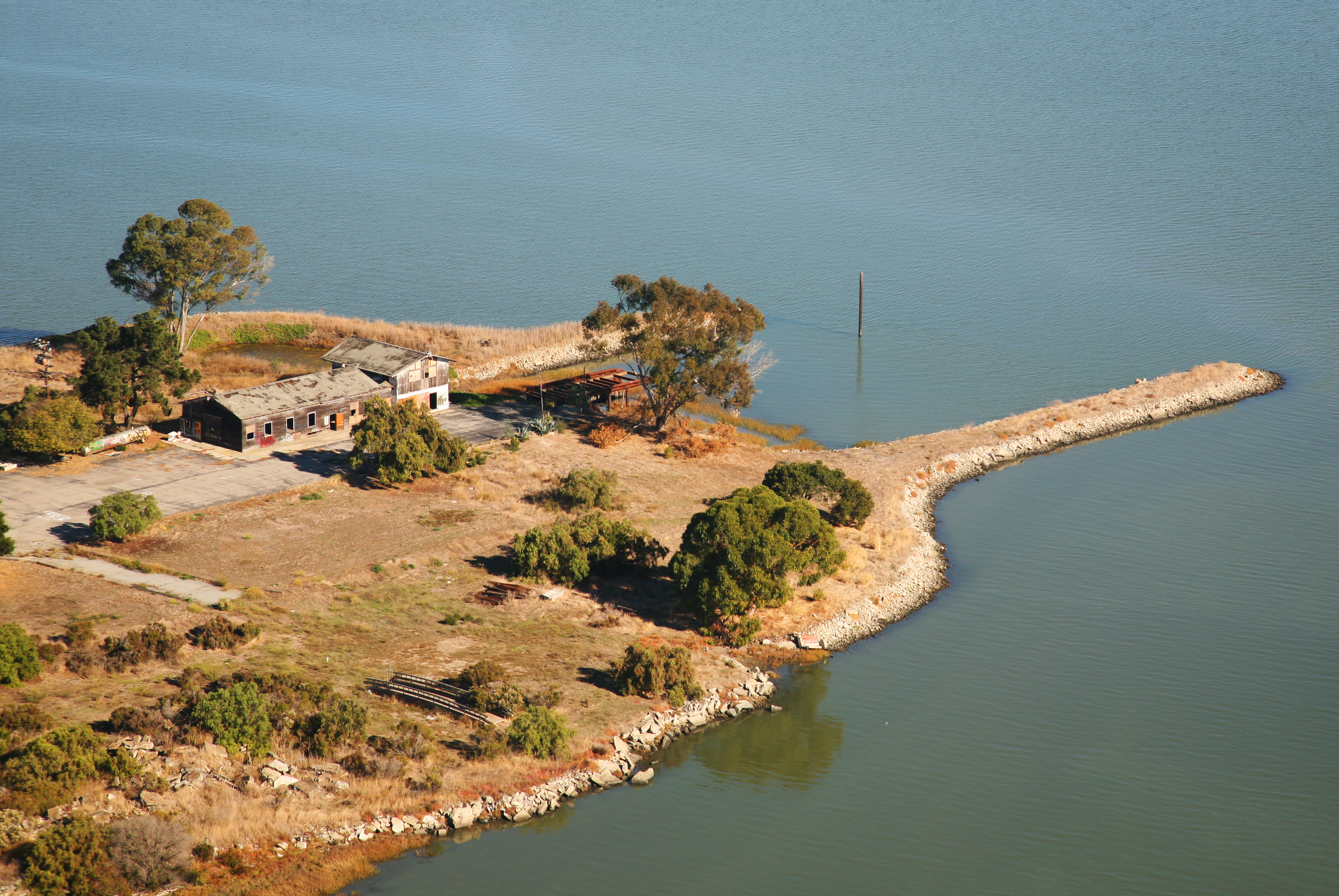
Cooley Landing, the location of Isaiah Churchill Woods' failed city of Ravenswood

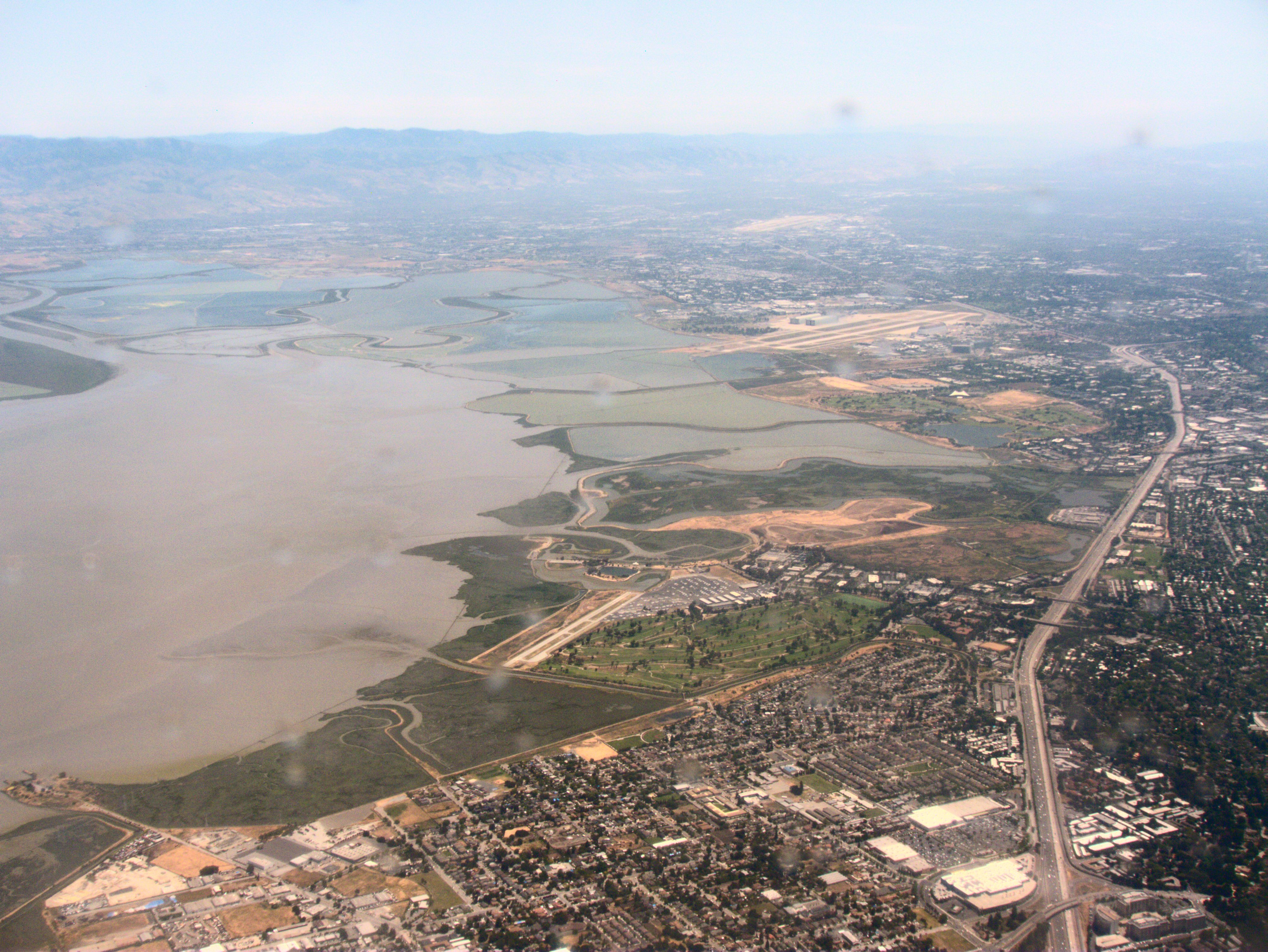
An aerial image of East Palo Alto, looking southeast towards Mountain View, California

The Ohlone tribe of Native Americans inhabited this area at least by 1500 to 1000 BC. One tumulus was discovered in 1951 during development of the University Village subdivision near today's Costaño School. After a year-long excavation of 60 graves and 3,000 artifacts, researchers concluded Native Americans had utilized the area as a cemetery and camp, rather than as a permanent settlement. In later years another mound was found near Willow Road and the railroad right-of-way.

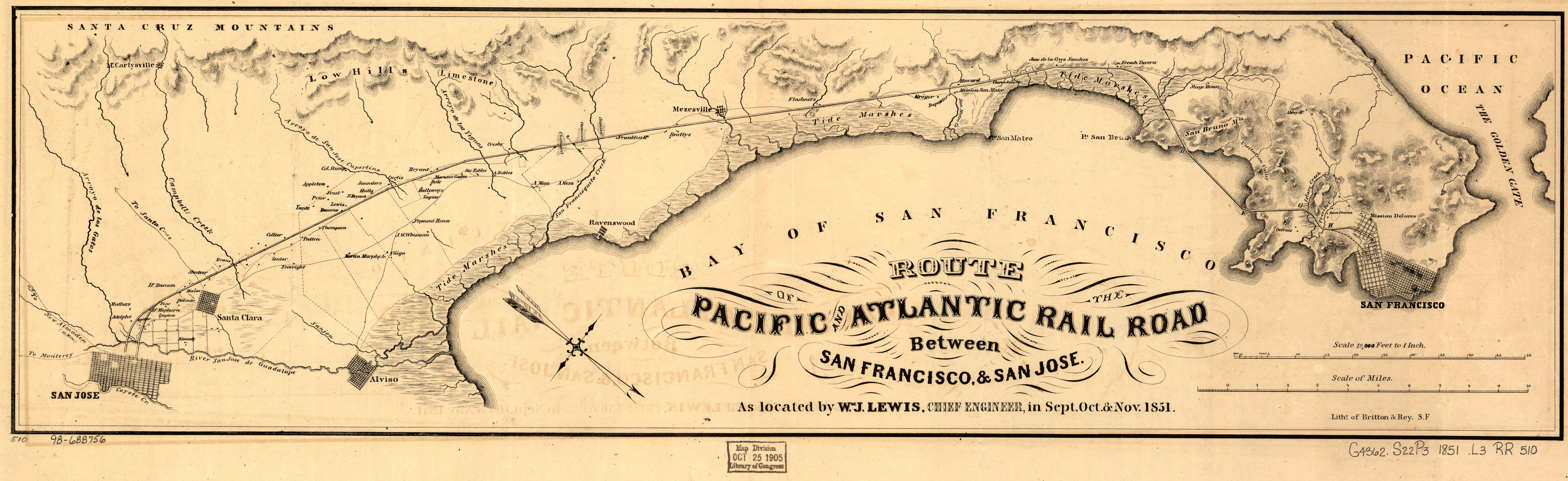
1851 map of a planned railroad between San Francisco and San Jose. Note Ravenswood, an earlier name of the Cooley Landing part of East Palo Alto, about midway on the coast.

From the 1850s through the 1940s, the area which was to become East Palo Alto went through many changes. In 1849, Isaiah Churchill Woods (1825–1880) attempted to make the area around what is now Cooley Landing in the northeast of the current city a major shipping town and named the area Ravenswood. In 1868, after Woods' investments failed he sold the wharf to Lester Phillip Cooley (1837–1882), who leased the land to the brick factory Hunter and Schakleford. When the brick factory left the landing in 1884, the land around the landing was reverted to a ranch.

With the outbreak of World War I, the north side of East Palo Alto became a military training ground, of which only the Veterans Administration Hospital in Menlo Park still exists (now as part of the VA Sierra Pacific Network). In the 1940s, East Palo Alto was a farming community with many Japanese residents. During the war, the Japanese were forced out, many to relocation centers, and did not return after the war.

In the 1950s the farms were built over with cheap housing and many African-American families moved in, the result of redlining housing policies. In particular, in 1954 the then-president of the California Real Estate Association, Floyd Lowe, implemented a strategy that turned a neighborhood on the East side of Palo Alto from predominantly white to predominantly black in a very short amount of time. He did this by "blockbusting," which is a strategy that was employed all over the country to similar results. Blockbusting involves instilling panic in white neighborhoods by warning of a "Negro invasion" when a black family considers purchasing a house in an area, in order to produce white flight and an ensuing drop in property values, which can then be purchased at a heavy discount and sold or rented to African Americans for a profit. In 1954, Lowe alerted the neighborhood that a "Negro invasion" was imminent, and as intended, white flight ensued. Lowe profited due to the low prices at which the white families fleeing were willing to sell their homes, and within a few years, the demographics of the area had flipped. As white-owned businesses fled the area, it became poorer and overcrowded – a legacy that has persisted. This segregationist act was never questioned by the government, and it led to many of the demographic and socioeconomic differences that exist between Palo Alto and East Palo Alto today.

These differences in demographics and wealth perversely accelerated with the introduction of the Community Reinvestment Act of 1977, which banned redlining. Home prices doubled by 1979, and many of the more educated and upwardly mobile African Americans took advantage of their newfound freedom to move into wealthier communities with more amenities, leaving the remaining community even poorer and with less access to home ownership than had been the case before the Act.

During the civil rights movement of the 1960s there was a renewed interest in African history, one expression of which was a fad for Swahili. In 1968 the area was almost renamed Nairobi, after the center of the Swahili-speaking area, to reflect the population's African roots. Critics of the change pointed out that Nairobi was the capital of Kenya, in East Africa, and had little to do with the cultural roots of most black Americans. In the end, the change was not made.

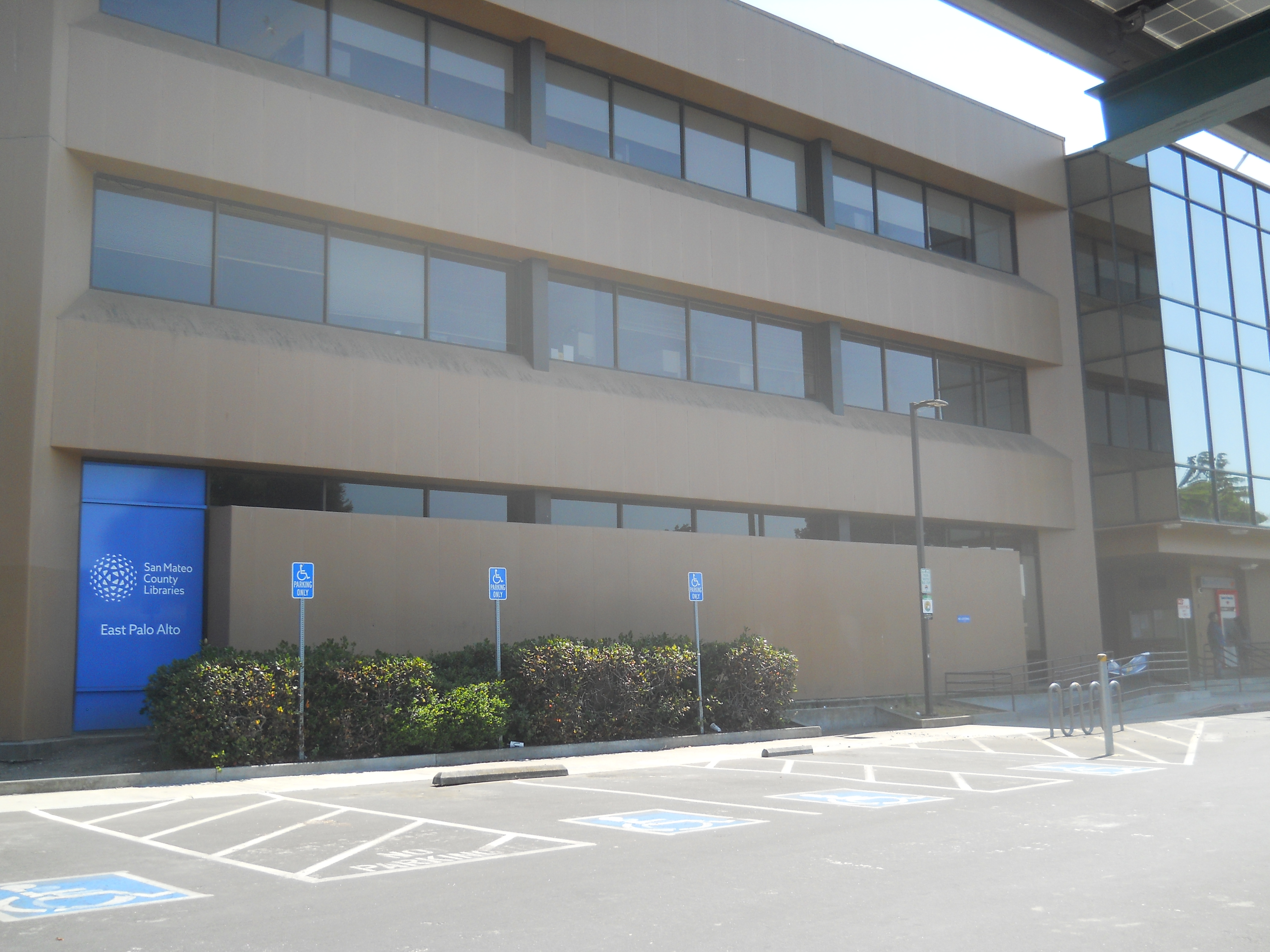
The East Palo Alto Municipal Building (2017), contains City Hall and the library.

Historically East Palo Alto had relatively little shopping and business compared to surrounding areas, and most of it constituted an unincorporated "island" (until 1983) within San Mateo County, depending on county government for services and on the San Mateo County Sheriff for police protection and ineligible for many revenue benefits requiring city status.

After several years of pro-incorporation campaigning by local community groups, a 1982 ballot measure that was stopped by a lawsuit, and a subsequent election the next year, East Palo Alto became a city on July 1, 1983. The final tally for incorporation was 1,777 for and 1,764 against, a margin of 13 votes and a majority of 50.2%. The main proponents of incorporation included Barbara A. Mouton, East Palo Alto's Senior Citizen Center president Ruth I. Myers, and the East Palo Alto Citizen’s Committee on Incorporation (EPACCI). The main opposition to incorporation was spearheaded by a group called Citizens Coalition Against Incorporation Now (CCAIN), along with three members of the pre-existing and powerless Municipal Council — Gertrude Wilks, Henry Anthony and Pat Johnson.

Barbara A. Mouton was East Palo Alto's first Mayor, with Omowale Satterwhite, Ruben Abrica, and James Blakey as initial council — all of whom were involved in efforts to incorporate the city.

Because of subsequent legal challenges to the last ballot measure, it was not until 1987 that the city was officially recognized as such. The legal challenges were led by former U.S. Congress member Pete McCloskey, who represented one of the real-estate brokers whose original blockbusting campaign had turned EPA into a mostly black town. The lawsuit alleged that voter fraud through absentee ballots contributed to the success of the vote for incorporation; However, the California Supreme Court unanimously denied this claim on August 22, 1986, and upheld the incorporation of the city.

In the 1980s, large numbers of Hispanics moved into East Palo Alto and by 1990, the city had lost its Black majority population which declined from 60 percent in 1980 to 41.5 percent in 1990 while the Hispanic population increased from 14 percent to 36 percent.

Significant gentrification occurred in East Palo Alto from around the founding of Facebook, with the construction of a large shopping center named Ravenswood 101 and several upscale housing communities intended for high-earning Silicon Valley workers. This development faced opposition from some residents, who charged that it priced locals out of one of the region's only affordable communities while providing only low-paying retail jobs and consuming disproportionate land area (2.2 square miles). Supporters pointed to an increased tax base.

In 2008, after twenty years without a supermarket, East Palo Alto individuals and organizations established the East Palo Alto Community Farmers' Market. In November 2009, the Mi Pueblo Food Center grocery store opened in the Ravenswood 101 shopping center in the location of the former Circuit City store. Mi Pueblo was the city's first full-service supermarket in 23 years.

Starting in 2006, a large real estate investor, Page Mill Properties, purchased almost the entire west side of East Palo Alto and contested most of the city's rent control laws in what some claimed was a 'predatory equity scheme'. Page Mill left East Palo Alto in the fall of 2009 after defaulting on a $240-million bank loan.

In 1992, the city had the country's highest per-capita murder rate, with 42 murders for 25,000 residents. This led to East Palo Alto being dubbed the "Murder Capital" of the United States during this time in the 1990s. In 2023, the city had no murders, the first time in its history.

== Geography ==
East Palo Alto is located in San Mateo County. Despite its name, it lies almost entirely north, and not east of Palo Alto. It is bordered on the west by Menlo Park, to the south by Palo Alto, and to the east by the San Francisco Bay. The San Francisquito Creek defines its southern edge. To the north are Ravenswood Point and the western end of the Dumbarton Bridge in Menlo Park.

According to the United States Census Bureau, the city has a total area of 2.6 square miles (6.7 km^{2}), of which 2.5 square miles (6.5 km^{2}) is land and 0.1 square miles (0.26 km^{2}) of it (4.11%) is water.

== Demographics ==
Historical population
| Census | Pop. | Note | %± |
|---|---|---|---|
| 1970 | 18,727 | | — |
| 1980 | 18,191 | | −2.9% |
| 1990 | 23,451 | | 28.9% |
| 2000 | 29,506 | | 25.8% |
| 2010 | 28,155 | | −4.6% |
| 2020 | 30,034 | | 6.7% |
U.S. Decennial Census; 1860–1870 1880-1890; 1900 1910 1920; 1930 1940 1950; 1960 1970 1980; 1990 2000 2010; 2020

=== Racial and ethnic composition ===
East Palo Alto, California – Racial and ethnic composition Note: the US Census treats Hispanic/Latino as an ethnic category. This table excludes Latinos from the racial categories and assigns them to a separate category. Hispanics/Latinos may be of any race.
| Race / Ethnicity (NH = Non-Hispanic) | Pop 2000 | Pop 2010 | Pop 2020 | % 2000 | % 2010 | % 2020 |
|---|---|---|---|---|---|---|
| White (NH) | 1,930 | 1,754 | 2,305 | 6.54% | 6.23% | 7.67% |
| Black or African American (NH) | 6,641 | 4,458 | 3,190 | 22.51% | 15.83% | 10.62% |
| Native American or Alaska Native (NH) | 66 | 30 | 24 | 0.22% | 0.11% | 0.08% |
| Asian (NH) | 621 | 1,025 | 1,567 | 2.10% | 3.64% | 5.22% |
| Native Hawaiian or Pacific Islander alone (NH) | 2,223 | 2,083 | 2,008 | 7.53% | 7.40% | 6.69% |
| Other race alone (NH) | 67 | 49 | 138 | 0.23% | 0.17% | 0.46% |
| Mixed race or Multiracial (NH) | 612 | 609 | 838 | 2.07% | 2.16% | 2.79% |
| Hispanic or Latino (any race) | 17,346 | 18,147 | 19,964 | 58.79% | 64.45% | 66.47% |
| Total | 29,506 | 28,155 | 30,034 | 100.00% | 100.00% | 100.00% |

=== 2020 census ===
As of the 2020 census, East Palo Alto had a population of 30,034 and a population density of 11,880.5 inhabitants per square mile (4,587.1/km^{2}).

The census reported that 99.5% of the population lived in households, 0.4% lived in non-institutionalized group quarters, and 0.1% were institutionalized. 100.0% of residents lived in urban areas, while 0.0% lived in rural areas.

There were 7,673 households, of which 49.0% had children under the age of 18. Of all households, 43.2% were married-couple households, 7.7% were cohabiting couple households, 28.7% had a female householder with no partner present, and 20.4% had a male householder with no partner present. About 16.9% of households were made up of individuals, and 5.2% had someone living alone who was 65 years of age or older. The average household size was 3.9. There were 5,777 families (75.3% of all households).

The age distribution was 25.4% under the age of 18, 11.6% aged 18 to 24, 33.0% aged 25 to 44, 21.5% aged 45 to 64, and 8.5% who were 65 years of age or older. The median age was 31.9 years. For every 100 females, there were 102.2 males, and for every 100 females age 18 and over there were 101.4 males.

There were 8,110 housing units at an average density of 3,208.1 units per square mile (1,238.7 units/km^{2}), of which 7,673 (94.6%) were occupied. Of occupied units, 37.2% were owner-occupied and 62.8% were occupied by renters. The homeowner vacancy rate was 0.6% and the rental vacancy rate was 4.1%.

=== Income and poverty ===
In 2023, the US Census Bureau estimated that the median household income was $104,832, and the per capita income was $40,141. About 7.0% of families and 9.7% of the population were below the poverty line.

=== 2010 census ===
The 2010 United States census reported that East Palo Alto had a population of 28,155. The population density was 10,777.1 inhabitants per square mile (4,161.1/km^{2}). The racial makeup of East Palo Alto was 1,754 (6.2%) White, 4,704 (16.7%) African American, 120 (0.4%) Native American, 1,057 (3.8%) Asian, 2,118 (7.5%) Pacific Islander, 10,694 (38.0%) from other races, and 1,358 (4.8%) from two or more races. Hispanic or Latino of any race were 18,147 persons (64.5%). Among the Hispanic population, 15,319 (54.4%) are Mexican, 69 (0.2%) are Puerto Rican, 23 (0.1%) are Cuban, and 2,736 (9.7%) are other Hispanic or Latino.

The Census reported that 28,001 people (99.5% of the population) lived in households, 150 (0.5%) lived in non-institutionalized group quarters, and 4 (0%) were institutionalized.

There were 6,940 households, out of which 3,767 (54.3%) had children under the age of 18 living in them, 3,144 (45.3%) were opposite-sex married couples living together, 1,510 (21.8%) had a female householder with no husband present, 625 (9.0%) had a male householder with no wife present. There were 529 (7.6%) unmarried opposite-sex partnerships, and 59 (0.9%) same-sex married couples or partnerships. 1,196 households (17.2%) were made up of individuals, and 316 (4.6%) had someone living alone who was 65 years of age or older. The average household size was 4.03. There were 5,279 families (76.1% of all households); the average family size was 4.38.

The population was spread out, with 8,976 people (31.9%) under the age of 18, 3,487 people (12.4%) aged 18 to 24, 8,897 people (31.6%) aged 25 to 44, 5,120 people (18.2%) aged 45 to 64, and 1,675 people (5.9%) who were 65 years of age or older. The median age was 28.1 years. For every 100 females, there were 102.7 males. For every 100 females age 18 and over, there were 102.5 males.

There were 7,819 housing units at an average density of 2,992.9/sq mi (1,155.6/km^{2}), of which 2,971 (42.8%) were owner-occupied, and 3,969 (57.2%) were occupied by renters. The homeowner vacancy rate was 2.1%; the rental vacancy rate was 13.3%. 12,628 people (44.9% of the population) lived in owner-occupied housing units and 15,373 people (54.6%) lived in rental housing units.

== Economy ==
=== Top employers ===
According to the city's 2021 Annual Comprehensive Financial Report, the city's top employers were:

| # | Employer | # of Employees | % of total employment |
|---|---|---|---|
| 1 | Amazon Web Services | 1,300 | 8.97% |
| 2 | Ravenswood City School District | 325 | 2.24% |
| 3 | Ikea | 250 | 1.72% |
| 4 | Home Depot | 240 | 1.66% |
| 5 | Ravenswood Family Health Center | 231 | 1.59% |
| 6 | DLA Piper LLP | 168 | 1.16% |
| 7 | City of East Palo Alto | 118 | 0.81% |
| 8 | Target (Note: Target shut down its East Palo Alto store in 2024.) | 118 | 0.81% |
| 9 | Four Seasons Hotel - Silicon Valley | 89 | 0.61% |
| 10 | Eastside College Preparatory School | 62 | 0.43% |

The total city employment for the year ended June 30, 2021, was 14,500, and the total city employment for 2014 was 13,800.

== Parks and recreation ==
The local area around the Dumbarton Bridge is an important ecological area, hosting many species of birds, fish and mammals. The California clapper rail is known to be present in the western bridge terminus area.

The Baylands Nature Preserve borders the city of East Palo Alto. The long trail along the marshland connects Mountain View, Palo Alto, and East Palo and it is used by bike commuters every day.

== Government ==
In the California State Legislature, East Palo Alto is in the 13th senatorial district, represented by Democrat Josh Becker, and in the 21st Assembly district, represented by Democrat Diane Papan, as of January 2024.

In the United States House of Representatives, East Palo Alto is in California's 15th congressional district, represented by Democrat Kevin Mullin, as of January 2024.

The terms of Mayor and Vice Mayor are for one year and expire at the first meeting in December. As of December 2025, Webster Lincoln is the mayor.

Mayors of East Palo Alto, California

| Image | Mayor | Years | Notes |
|---|---|---|---|
| | Barbara Mouton | 1983 – April 21, 1986; April 21, 1986 – May 1, 1987 | First mayor of East Palo Alto; The first election since the founding of the city was held on April 8, 1986, with Mouton winning reelection as the top votegetter to the City Council after serving three years as mayor. She was reappointed mayor in a 3-2 secret ballot on April 21, 1986 The term of the mayor was reduced to one year thereafter. |
| | James E. Blakey Jr. | May 4, 1987 – April 18, 1988 | Lost reelection to the council in the April 12, 1988, election; Last day in office was April 18, 1988. |
| | John Bostic | April 19, 1988 – July 18, 1988 | Resigned July 18, 1988, after pleading no-contest on July 8 to a misdemeanor charge of illegal election filing. |
| | William Vines | July 19, 1988 – September 6, 1988 (Acting); September 6, 1988 – 1990 | Selected as vice mayor on July 19, 1988; served as acting mayor as council deadlocked on selecting new mayor. Selected as mayor on September 6, 1988 |
| | Warnell Coats | 1991 | |
| | Pat Johnson | 1992 | |
| | Sharifa Wilson | 1992–1995 | |
| | Rose Jacobs Gibson | 1995–1997 | In 1999, she was appointed as the first African-American on the San Mateo County Board of Supervisors; and subsequently elected three times. She served as President of the Board in 2003 and 2007. |
| | R.B. Jones | Dec 1996 – Dec 1998 | |
| | Sharifa Wilson (2nd term) | 1999–2000 | |
| | Myrtle Walker | 2001 | |
| | Duane G. Bay | 2002 | |
| | Patricia Foster | 2003 | |
| | Donna Rutherford | 2004 | |
| | David E. Woods | 2005 | |
| | Ruben Abrica | 2006 | |
| | David E. Woods (2nd term) | 2007 | |
| | Patricia Foster (2nd term) | 2008 | |
| | Ruben Abrica (2nd term) | 2009 | |
| | David E. Woods (3rd term) | 2010 | |
| | Carlos Romero | 2011 | |
| | Laura Martinez | 2012 | |
| | Ruben Abrica (3rd term) | 2013 | |
| | Laura Martinez (2nd term) | 2014 | |
| | Lisa Yarbrough-Gauthier | 2015 | |
| | Donna Rutherford (2nd term) | 2016 | |
| | Larry Moody | 2017 | |
| | Ruben Abrica (4th term) | 2018 | |
| | Lisa Yarbrough-Gauthier (2nd term) | 2019 | |
| | Regina Wallace-Jones | 2020 | |
| | Carlos Romero (2nd term) | 2021 | |
| | Ruben Abrica (5th term) | 2022 | |
| | Lisa Gauthier (3rd term) | 2023 | |
| | Antonio Lopez | 2024 | |
| | Martha Barragan | 2025 | |
| Webster Lincoln | Webster Lincoln | 2026 | |

== Education ==
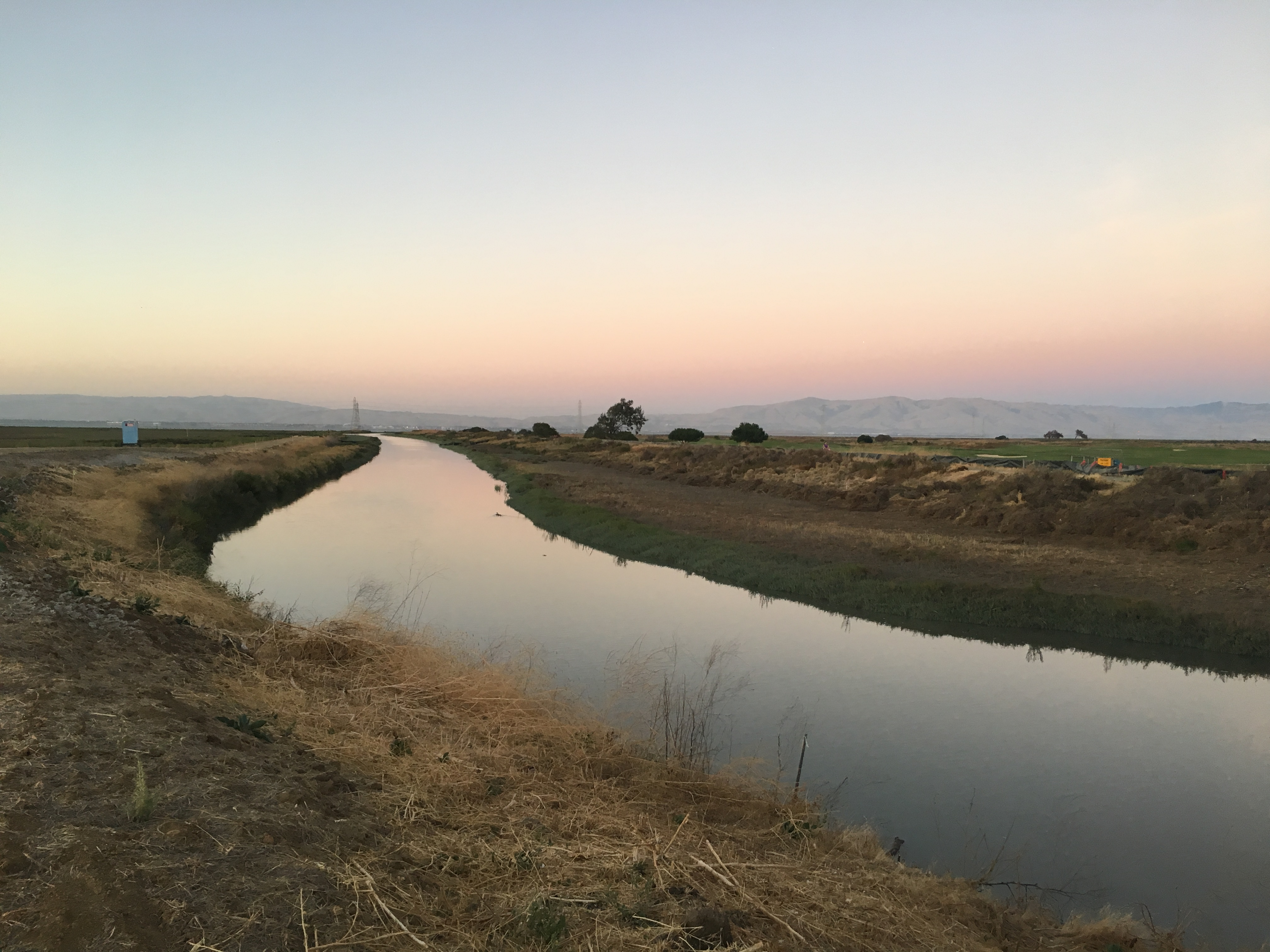
San Francisquito Creek (2018) in East Palo Alto

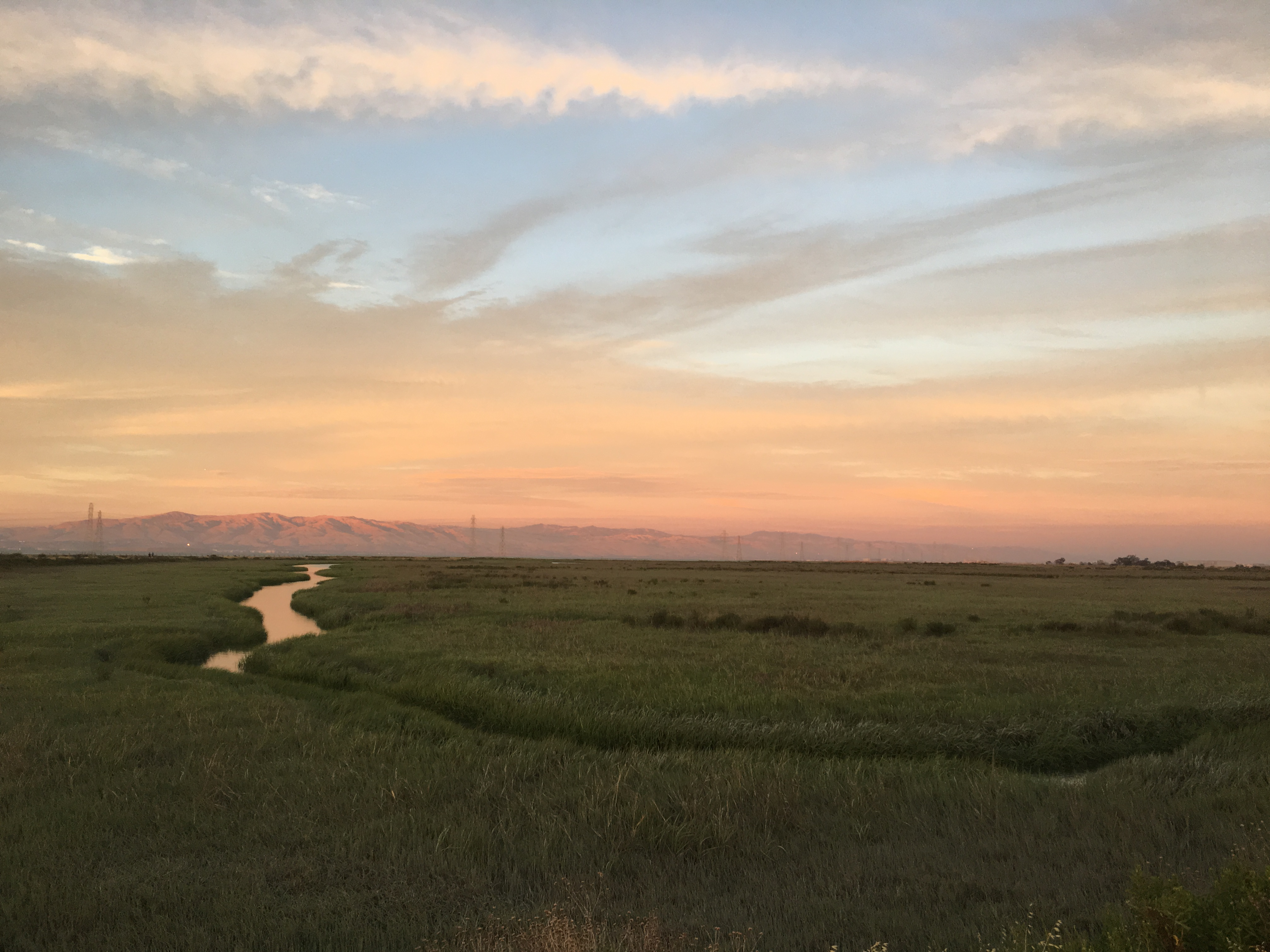
Don Edwards San Francisco Bay National Wildlife Refuge in East Palo Alto

=== Primary and secondary schools ===
The Ravenswood City School District has its headquarters in East Palo Alto.

The schools in the city are Costaño School of the Arts, Belle Haven Elementary, Los Robles-Ronald McNair Academy, and Cesar Chavez Ravenswood Middle School.

The Sequoia Union High School District operates the zoned high schools in the area. Between 1958 and 1976 East Palo Alto had its own high school, Ravenswood High School. After the school was closed because of low enrollment, the building was demolished in 1995 to make room for the Gateway 101 Shopping Center. Following the closure of Ravenswood High School, East Palo Alto's high school students were bused out of the city to other schools in the region, primarily Carlmont High School in Belmont. Some have called for re-opening Ravenswood High School in a new location in East Palo Alto.

In 2014, the Sequoia Union High School District discontinued the practice of busing. Today, East Palo Alto residents are zoned to Menlo-Atherton High School in Atherton. Through the district Open Enrollment process, some residents choose to attend Carlmont, Woodside High School in Woodside, or Sequoia High School in Redwood City. Alternatively, East Palo Alto Academy (opened in 2001 as East Palo Alto High School) and East Palo Alto Phoenix Academy (opened 2006) are charter high schools in East Palo Alto. There is also a private high school, Eastside College Preparatory, which opened in 1996.

Every year, parents of incoming minority children in kindergarten through grade 2 can enter a lottery (if there are more requests than the 135 slots available) to send their children to neighboring school districts under the Tinsley Voluntary Transfer Program.

=== Public libraries ===
San Mateo County Libraries operates the East Palo Alto Library, located in the municipal building at 2415 University Avenue.

== Media ==
The Ravenswood Post (1953–1981) was an African-American weekly newspaper serving East Palo Alto. The East Palo Alto Progress (1983—1986) succeeded the Ravenswood Post, serving East Palo Alto immediately after incorporation, running for four volumes. Other local news publishings included the newspaper, East Palo Alto Today; former newspaper, The Peninsula Bulletin; and the magazine, El Ravenswood.

== Transportation ==
U.S. Route 101 cuts through the southern part of the city, with two on ramps and off ramps in the city (University and Willow). There are frontage roads on either side of the freeway. The Dumbarton Bridge in neighboring Menlo Park connects East Palo Alto to Alameda County, which lies to the east across San Francisco Bay, and carries State Route 84 into East Palo Alto toward U.S. 101.

Public transportation is provided by SamTrans.
