= California State Route 84 =

Highway in California

State Route 84
- SR 84 highlighted in red, with the relinquished portions in West Sacramento in pink

Route information
- Maintained by Caltrans
- Length: 96 mi (154 km)
- Tourist routes: Niles Canyon Road between SR 238 in Fremont and I-680 near Sunol
- Restrictions: Special restrictions: No hazardous material in the Sunol Valley between SR 238 and I-680; No tractor-trailers or vehicles over 16.25 tons on the Ryer Island Ferry. Length restrictions may also apply.

Section 1
- West end: SR 1 at San Gregorio
- Major intersections: I-280 at Woodside; US 101 from Redwood City to Menlo Park; I-880 from Newark to Fremont; SR 238 in Fremont; I-680 near Sunol
- East end: I-580 in Livermore

Section 2
- South end: SR 12 in Rio Vista
- North end: Near Levee Access Road at the southern city limits of West Sacramento

Location
- Country: United States
- State: California
- Counties: San Mateo, Alameda, Solano, Yolo, Sacramento

Highway system
- State highways in California; Interstate; US; State; Scenic; History; Pre‑1964; Unconstructed; Deleted; Freeways
← SR 83	→ SR 85

State Route 84 (SR 84) is a state highway in the U.S. state of California that consists of two unconnected segments, one in the San Francisco Bay Area and the other primarily in the Sacramento–San Joaquin River Delta area.

The first section is an east–west arterial road running from SR 1 in San Gregorio to Menlo Park, across the Dumbarton Bridge through Fremont and Newark and ending at I-580 in Livermore. The segment between Marsh Road and the Dumbarton Bridge has been upgraded to an expressway and is known as the Bayfront Expressway. The segment from the eastern end of the Dumbarton Bridge to the interchange with I-880 has been upgraded to a freeway.

The other section is a north-south arterial road that begins at SR 12 in Rio Vista, passes through Ryer Island (where it connects to SR 220), and ends in West Sacramento. The Ryer Island Ferry provides the crossing over Cache Slough from Rio Vista to Ryer Island. The ferry is a diesel-powered boat operated by Caltrans, and is in operation twenty-four hours per day and charges no toll.

There are no plans to connect the two unconnected segments of SR 84 at this time. A proposed toll road called the Mid-State Tollway along the proposed route was abandoned in 2001 due to local opposition.

== Route description ==
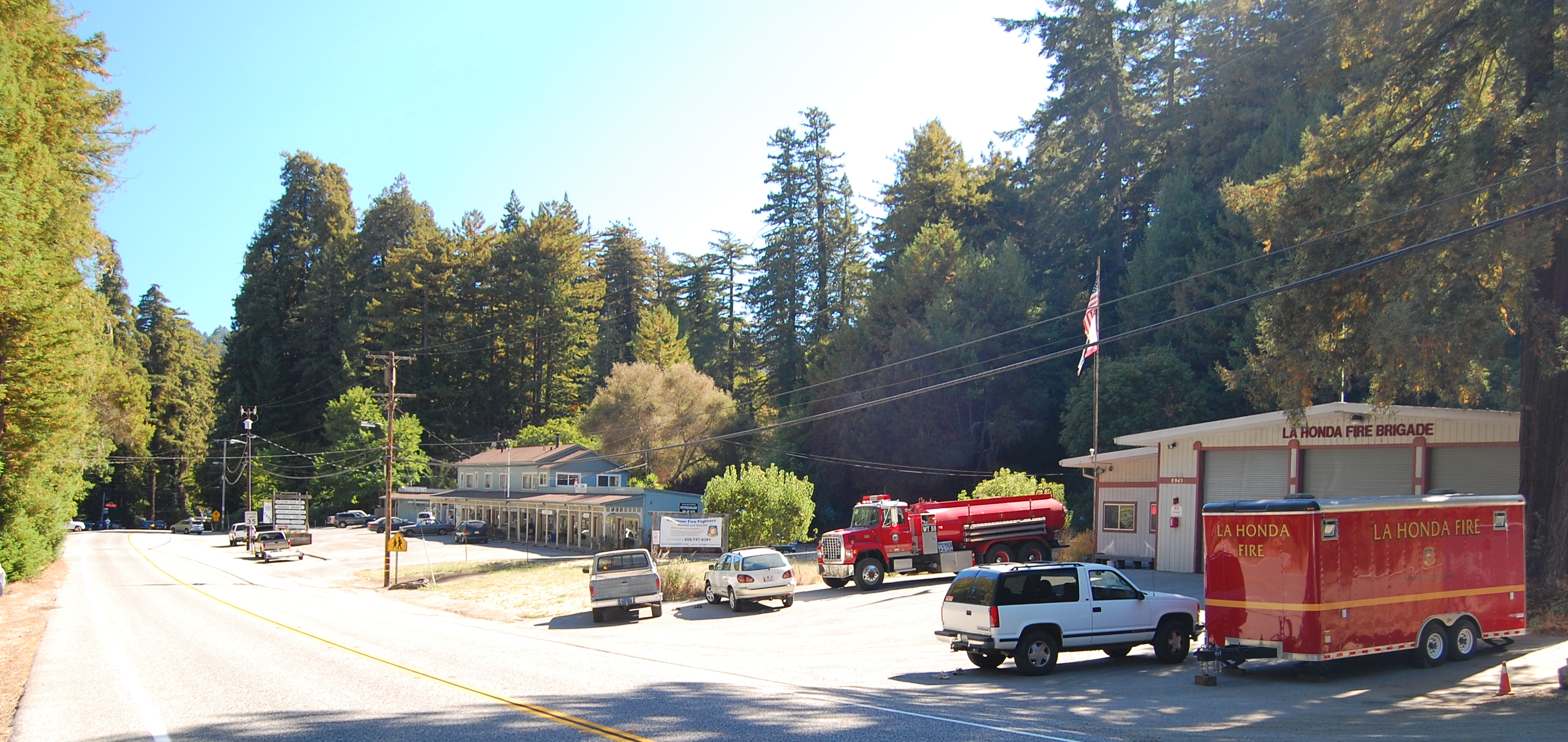
SR 84 through La Honda.

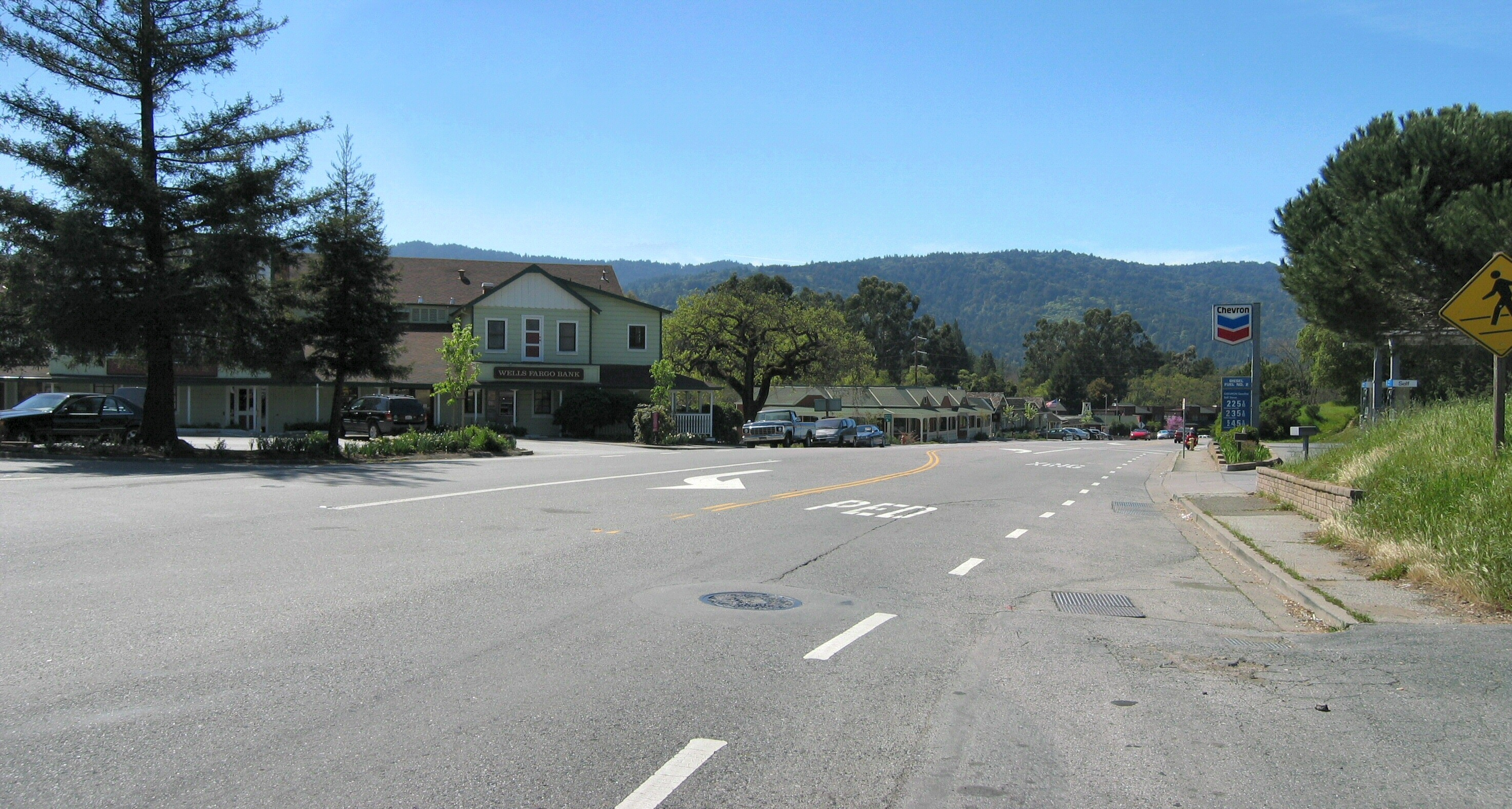
SR 84 in Woodside at the intersection of Whisky Hill Road

Route 84 is defined in section 384, subsection (a), of the California Streets and Highways Code:

Route 84 is from:
(1) Route 1 near San Gregorio to Route 101 at Woodside Road in Redwood City.
(2) Route 101 at Marsh Road in Menlo Park to Route 880.
(3) Route 880 to Route 238.
(4) Route 238 to Route 680 near Scotts Corners via the vicinity of Sunol.
(5) Route 680 near Scotts Corners to Route 580 in Livermore.
(6) Route 580 in Livermore to Route 4 near Brentwood.
(7) Route 12 at Rio Vista to the southerly city limit of the City of West Sacramento.

The definition omits concurrencies with various other routes instead of duplicating those segments in those other routes' definitions in the code. Conversely, it includes the segment between Livermore and Brentwood that was never constructed While control of the former northern end of Route 84 was relinquished by the state to West Sacramento, subdivision (b) further mandates that the city must still "maintain within its jurisdiction signs directing motorists to the continuation of Route 84". In addition, subdivision (c) permits the state to relinquish control of the segment between Route 880 to Route 238 in Fremont.

SR 84 is part of the California Freeway and Expressway System, and from I-280 to the eastern Fremont city limits and from the southern terminous of Isabel Avenue in Livermore to I-580 is part of the National Highway System, a network of highways that are considered essential to the country's economy, defense, and mobility by the Federal Highway Administration. SR 84 is eligible for the State Scenic Highway System, and is designated as a scenic highway by the California Department of Transportation from SR 238 to I-680 in Alameda County, meaning that it is a substantial section of highway passing through a "memorable landscape" with no "visual intrusions", where the potential designation has gained popular favor with the community.

=== Southern section ===
The route begins at SR 1 on the Pacific coast near San Gregorio. It then heads northeast through San Mateo County, following San Gregorio Road and La Honda Road and crossing the Santa Cruz Mountains. As it enters Woodside, it intersects SR 35, also known as Skyline Boulevard. From the juncture of La Honda Road with Portola Road to US 101 it follows Woodside Road. It then passes through downtown Woodside. After intersecting I-280, it enters Redwood City, where it intersects SR 82, which carries El Camino Real through the South Bay. A few miles later, it interchanges with US 101, which it overlaps for a few miles.

Upon routing eastward, it enters the city of Menlo Park as an expressway, called the Bayfront Expressway, which features traffic signals at Menlo Park streets, at driveways serving Meta headquarters, and at intersections with SR 114 and SR 109. The Marsh Road intersection, in 2013, was the site where a car struck cyclist Sam Felder, a Facebook employee, after he ran a red light. He died 3 months later. The SR 114 (Willow Road) intersection was the site of a car crash in which author David Halberstam was killed on April 23, 2007.

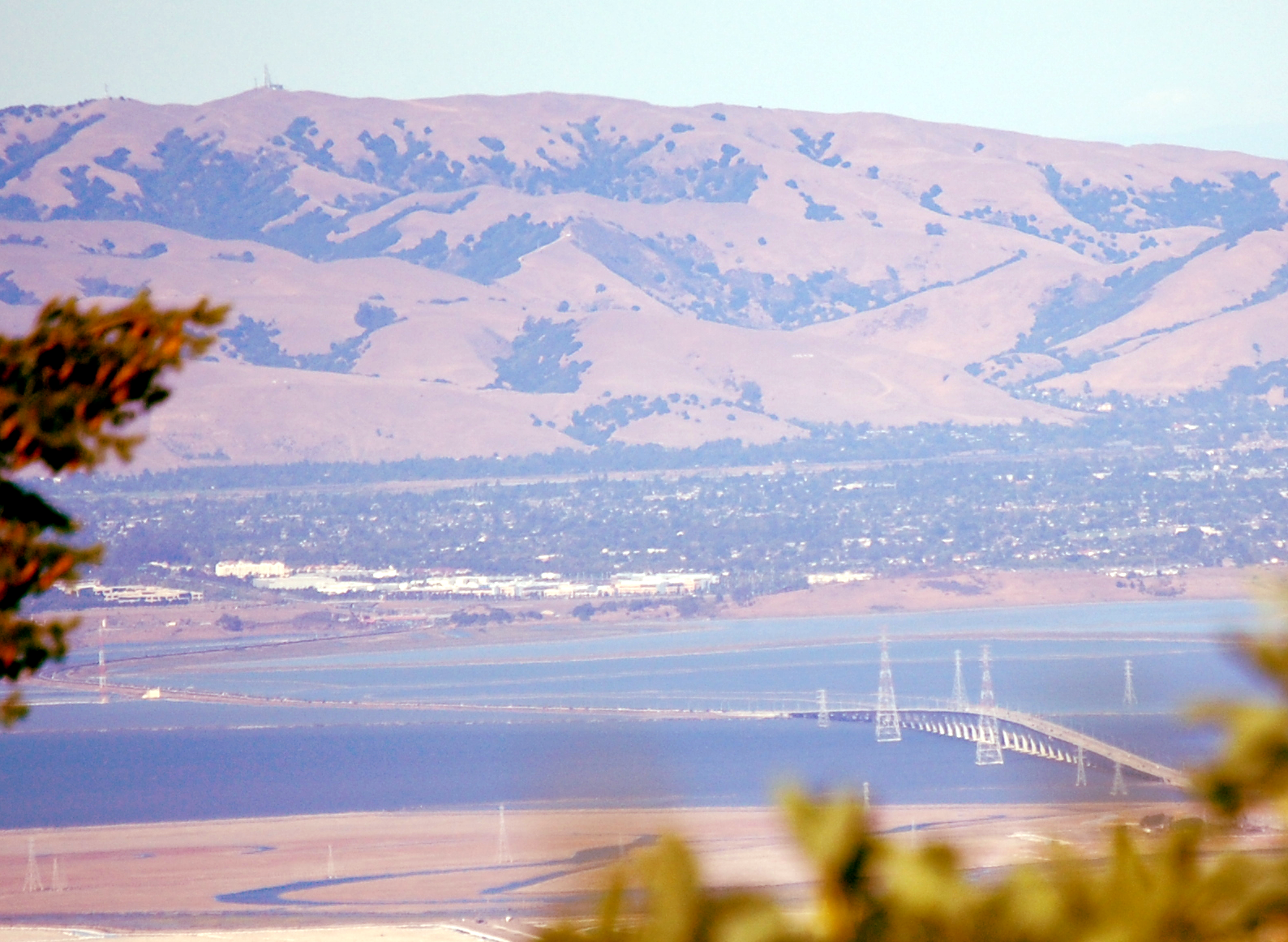
Dumbarton Bridge on SR 84 as seen from Skeggs Point.

SR 84 then becomes a freeway at the south end of San Mateo County as it crosses as the Dumbarton Bridge over the San Francisco Bay. Midway over the bridge, it enters Alameda County. In Alameda County, it runs northward through the city of Newark, where it begins a concurrency southwards with I-880 for about one mile. Both interchanges with I-880 are partial cloverleaf interchanges. Upon separation, however, the route is not built to freeway standards as it enters the city of Fremont, following the streets of Thornton Avenue, Fremont Boulevard, Peralta Boulevard, and Mowry Avenue, which after, it has a short concurrency northwards with SR 238.

SR 84 then leaves Fremont through the historic Sunol Valley. Parts of the valley are extremely narrow and are referred to as Niles Canyon; this part of the route is officially a scenic route. The section is known as Niles Canyon Road, and there are legends of a Niles Canyon ghost inhabiting the area.

After exiting the valley, it begins an overlap with I-680. After separating, it runs through Vallecitos Valley. It then goes over grasslands until it reaches a pass, then enters the city of Livermore with Ruby Hill development on the left. SR 84 then runs along Isabel Avenue until it meets I-580, as the end of its southern section. SR 84 is unconstructed from I-580 to SR 12.

=== Northern section ===
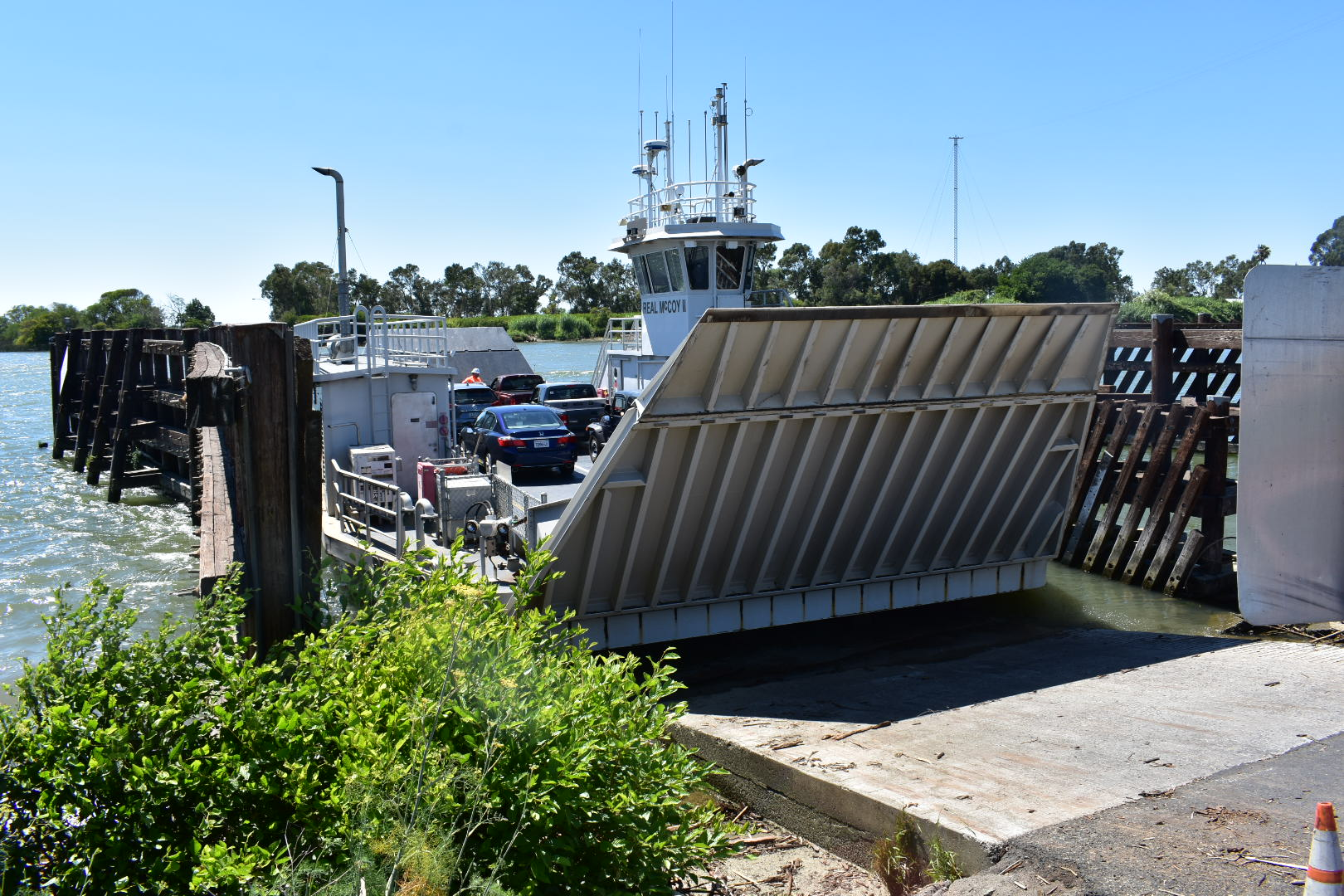
Ryer Island ferry

The second section of SR 84 starts in Rio Vista at SR 12. It then follows the Ryer Island Ferry, which carries the route across the Cache Slough. When it leaves the ferry, it intersects SR 220. It continues northward and meets the end of state maintenance at the West Sacramento city limit, about six miles east of an intersection with CR E19. It then enters the city of West Sacramento in Yolo County. It then interchanges with I-80 Business, also signed as US 50. As it continues northward, it ends at I-80. From north of West Sacramento, SR 84 has been relinquished and was given to the city of West Sacramento in 2003.

== History ==
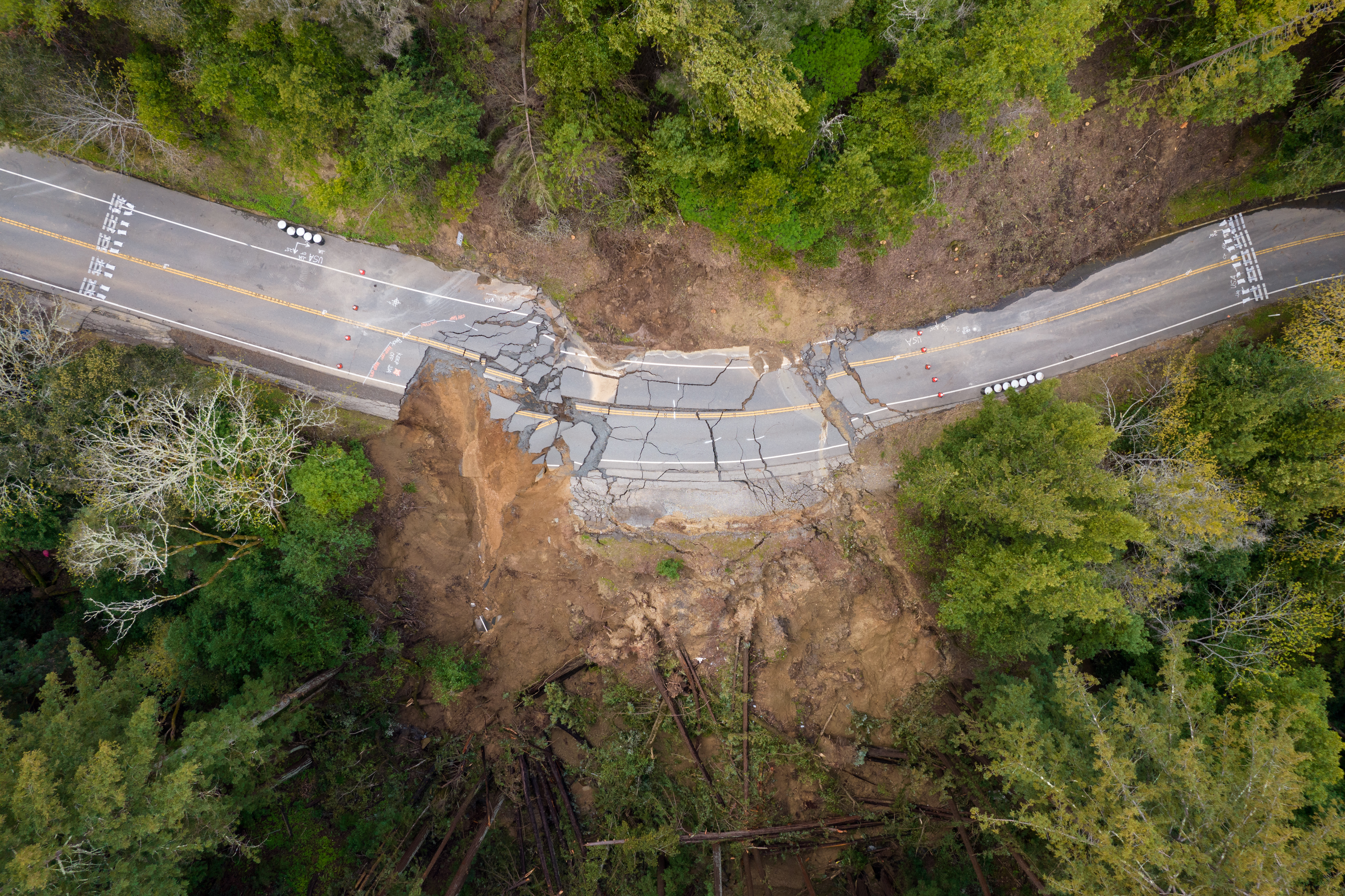
Aerial view of SR 84 near Woodside that was damaged during the 2022–2023 California floods.

=== Original routing ===
Until recent years, all of CA-84 consisted of narrow, two-lane roads in California. This has remained almost unchanged except for urban areas and the CA-84 widening project in the Tri-Valley.

=== Modern history ===
==== Mid-State Tollway ====
Route 84 is legally defined to continue from I-580 to SR 4 in Antioch, but there are currently no plans in place to bridge the gap at this time. A plan to build a $600 million toll road called the Mid-State Tollway along the proposed route was suspended in 2001 due to local opposition.

==== CA-84 widening project ====
In the late 2000s and 2010s, a widening project began on Route 84 from I-680 near Sunol to I-580 in Livermore. This included a better connection between Stanley Boulevard and Isabel Avenue. The project was to be done in five phases:

1. Isabel Avenue/I-580 interchange
2. Jack London Boulevard to Concannon Boulevard, including connections to Stanley Boulevard
3. Concannon Boulevard to Vallecitos Road intersection and southern Ruby Hill entrance
4. Northern side of pass
5. Southern side of pass to I-680

Costs were estimated to be between $400 and $500 million.

As of 2026, all 5 phases have been completed.

==== Ryer Island Ferry ====
Both the Ryer Island Ferry and the Howard Landing Ferry along Route 220 are the only state-run ferries, and there are no plans to replace them with bridges due to the low traffic numbers around Ryer Island. The only road bridge connecting Ryer Island is on its north side, which results in longer commutes for residents if one or both ferries shutdown.

== Major intersections ==
Except where prefixed with a letter, postmiles were measured on the road as it was in 1964, based on the alignment that existed at the time, and do not necessarily reflect current mileage. Postmile prefixes include: R reflecting a realignment in the route since then, M indicating a second realignment, L referring to an overlap due to a correction or change, and T indicating postmiles classified as temporary. Segments that remain unconstructed or have been relinquished to local control may be omitted. The numbers reset at county lines; the start and end postmiles in each county are given in the county column.

County	Location	Postmile	Exit	Destinations	Notes
San Mateo; SM 0.00-R30.15	San Gregorio	0.00		SR 1 – Half Moon Bay, Santa Cruz	Southwest end of SR 84
San Mateo; SM 0.00-R30.15	Woodside	14.95		SR 35 (Skyline Boulevard) – San Francisco, Santa Cruz	
San Mateo; SM 0.00-R30.15	Woodside	21.54		I-280 (Junipero Serra Freeway) – San Francisco, San Jose	Interchange; I-280 exit 25
San Mateo; SM 0.00-R30.15	Redwood City	24.70		SR 82 (El Camino Real)	Interchange
San Mateo; SM 0.00-R30.15	Redwood City	5.72 5.39 (Note: Indicates that the postmile represents the distance along US 101 rather than SR 84.)		US 101 north (Bayshore Freeway) / Seaport Boulevard – San Francisco	Interchange; west end of US 101 overlap; US 101 exit 408
San Mateo; SM 0.00-R30.15	Redwood City	5.72 5.39	Western end of freeway on US 101		
San Mateo; SM 0.00-R30.15	Menlo Park	3.59 R25.81	Eastern end of freeway on US 101		
San Mateo; SM 0.00-R30.15	Menlo Park	3.59 R25.81		US 101 south (Bayshore Freeway) / Marsh Road – San Jose, Atherton	Interchange; east end of US 101 overlap; US 101 exit 406
San Mateo; SM 0.00-R30.15	Menlo Park	R27.66		Willow Road (SR 114)	
San Mateo; SM 0.00-R30.15	Menlo Park	R28.19		University Avenue (SR 109)	
San Mateo; SM 0.00-R30.15	Menlo Park		Western end of freeway		
San Mateo; SM 0.00-R30.15	Menlo Park		—	Ravenswood, S.F. Bay National Wildlife Refuge	
San Francisco Bay		R29.25– R0.00	Dumbarton Bridge (westbound toll only)		
Alameda; ALA R0.00-R28.63	Newark	R3.75	36	Thornton Avenue, Paseo Padre Parkway	Last free exit for westbound traffic
Alameda; ALA R0.00-R28.63	Newark	R4.88	37	Newark Boulevard, Ardenwood Boulevard	
Alameda; ALA R0.00-R28.63	Newark	R6.01 10.30 (Note: Indicates that the postmile represents the distance along I-880 rather than SR 84.)	38	I-880 north (Nimitz Freeway) / Decoto Road – Oakland	Interchange; west end of I-880 overlap; I-880 exit 21; former SR 17 north
Alameda; ALA R0.00-R28.63	Fremont	8.84 6.92	Eastern end of freeway on I-880		
Alameda; ALA R0.00-R28.63	Fremont	8.84 6.92		I-880 south (Nimitz Freeway) / Thornton Avenue – San Jose	Interchange; east end of I-880 overlap; I-880 exit 19; former SR 17 south
Alameda; ALA R0.00-R28.63	Fremont	10.82 3.31 (Note: Indicates that the postmile represents the distance along SR 238 rather than SR 84.)		SR 238 south (Mission Boulevard) – San Jose	West end of SR 238 overlap
Alameda; ALA R0.00-R28.63	Fremont	3.64 10.83		SR 238 north (Mission Boulevard) / Niles Boulevard – Hayward, Union City	East end of SR 238 overlap
Alameda; ALA R0.00-R28.63	Sunol	16.93		Sunol (Main Street)	Interchange; eastbound exit and westbound entrance
Alameda; ALA R0.00-R28.63		17.99 R11.04 (Note: Indicates that the postmile represents the distance along I-680 rather than SR 84.)		I-680 south / Calaveras Road – Fremont, San Jose	Interchange; west end of I-680 overlap; I-680 north exit 21A, south exit 21
Alameda; ALA R0.00-R28.63		17.99 R11.04	Western end of freeway on I-680		
Alameda; ALA R0.00-R28.63		R11.85 17.99	—	I-680 north – Walnut Creek, Sacramento	East end of I-680 overlap; I-680 north exit 21B, south via a U-turn at exit 21
Alameda; ALA R0.00-R28.63			Eastern end of freeway		
Alameda; ALA R0.00-R28.63	Pleasanton	23.56		Vallecitos Road – Downtown Livermore	Former SR 84 east
Alameda; ALA R0.00-R28.63	Livermore	R26.22		Stanley Boulevard	Interchange
Alameda; ALA R0.00-R28.63	Livermore			I-580 / Isabel Avenue to Portola Avenue – Oakland, Stockton	Interchange; northeast end of southwestern segment of SR 84; I-580 exit 51
Gap in route
Solano; SOL 0.13-13.67	Rio Vista	0.13		SR 12 / Front Street – Lodi, Fairfield, Rio Vista	Interchange; south end of northern segment of SR 84
Solano; SOL 0.13-13.67		2.49	Ryer Island Ferry across Cache Slough		
Solano; SOL 0.13-13.67		7.25		SR 220 east – Ryde	Western terminus of SR 220
Yolo; YOL 0.00-24.05		9.53		CR E19 east (Clarksburg Road) – Clarksburg	Western terminus of CR E19
Yolo; YOL 0.00-24.05	West Sacramento	15.69	North end of state maintenance at West Sacramento city limit		
Yolo; YOL 0.00-24.05	West Sacramento	R21.78		US 50 (I-80 BL, I-305) – San Francisco, Sacramento	Interchange; former I-80; US 50 / I-80 BL exit 3
Yolo; YOL 0.00-24.05	West Sacramento	21.84		To Capitol Mall (SR 275, Cabaldon Parkway)	Interchange; former US 40 / US 99W (1955–1964); formerly Tower Bridge Gateway
Yolo; YOL 0.00-24.05	West Sacramento	22.06		West Capitol Avenue	Former US 40 / US 99W (1926–1955)
Yolo; YOL 0.00-24.05	West Sacramento	22.68		Sacramento Avenue, Kegle Drive	Sacramento Avenue is former SR 16 east
Yolo; YOL 0.00-24.05	West Sacramento	23.47		Sunset Avenue – Woodland	Former SR 16 west
Yolo; YOL 0.00-24.05	West Sacramento	24.05		I-80 to I-5 – Reno, San Francisco	Interchange; north end of SR 84; former I-880; I-80 exit 83; access to I-5 via I-80 east
Yolo; YOL 0.00-24.05	West Sacramento	24.05		Reed Avenue	Continuation beyond I-80
1.000 mi = 1.609 km; 1.000 km = 0.621 mi: Concurrency terminus; Electronic toll collection; Incomplete access

== See also ==
- Vasco Road
