= Ravenswood City School District =

School district in California, United States

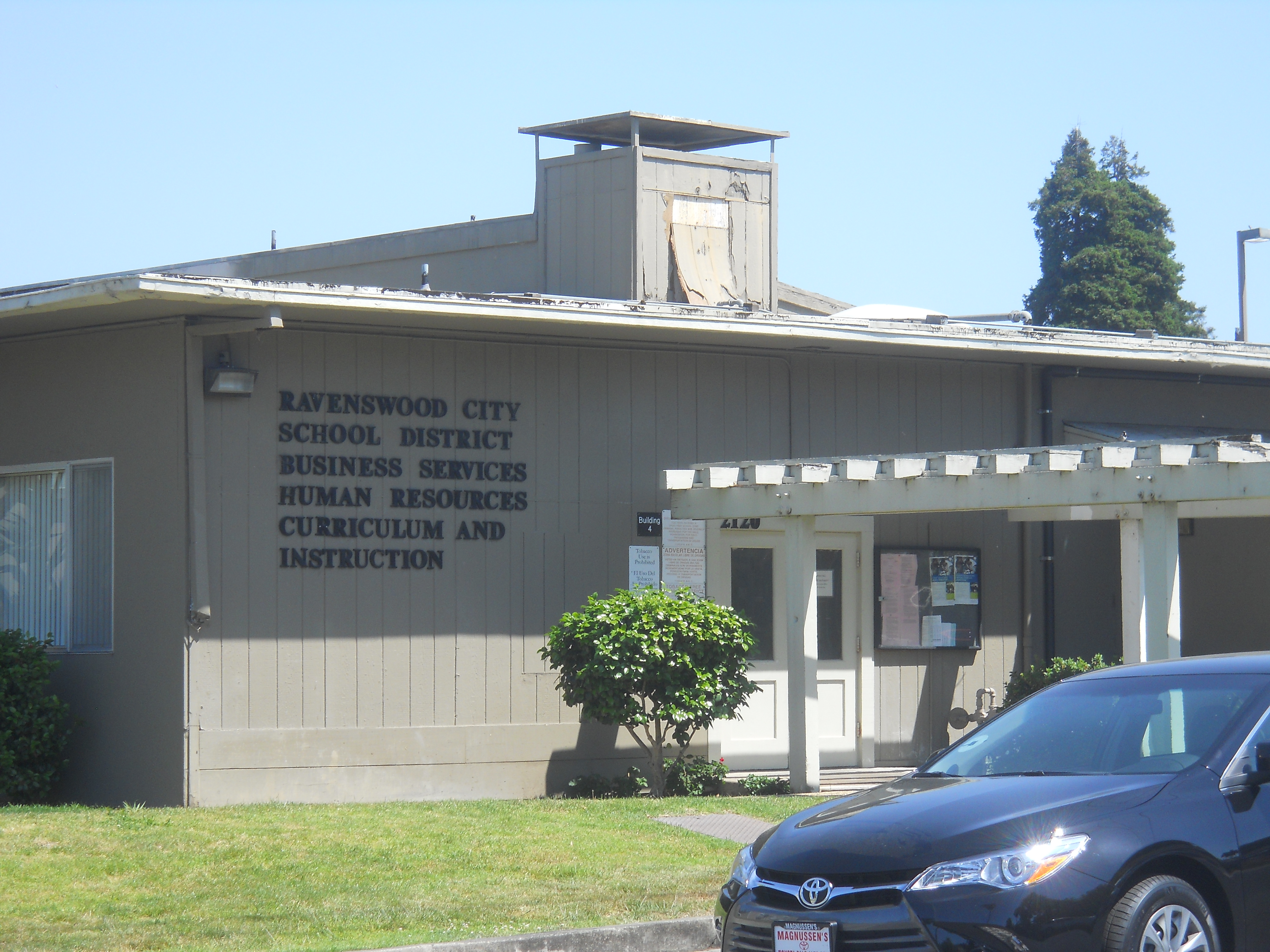
- District headquarters

Address
- 2120 Euclid Avenue East Palo Alto, California, 94303; United States

District information
- Type: Public
- Grades: K–8
- NCES District ID: 0631860

Students and staff
- Students: 1,731 (2020–2021)
- Teachers: 96.52 (FTE)
- Staff: 153.25 (FTE)
- Student–teacher ratio: 17.93:1

Other information
- Website: www.ravenswoodschools.org

The Ravenswood City School District is a public school district headquartered in East Palo Alto, California, US. The district, in the San Francisco Bay Area, serves the communities of East Palo Alto and eastern Menlo Park. Students from this school district who continue on with public schooling matriculate to the Sequoia Union High School District.

In 2008-09 it served over 4,500 students. In 2019-20 student enrollment declined to approximately 3,200 with further enrollment declines projected. In the 2021-22 school year, student enrollment is reported as approximately 2,800.

Notable teachers within the history of the district include Shirley A. R. Lewis.

== Schools ==
=== Elementary schools ===
- Belle Haven Elementary (TK, Kindergarten - 5th)
- Costaño School of the Arts (TK, Kindergarten - 5th)
- Los Robles-Ronald McNair Academy (TK, Kindergarten - 5th)

=== Middle school ===
- Cesar Chavez Ravenswood Middle School (6th - 8th)
