= Junipero Serra Boulevard =

Street in San Francisco

- Part of: SR 1 between I-280 in Daly City and 19th Ave in San Francisco
- Namesake: Junípero Serra
- Maintained by: Caltrans and local governments
- Length: 7.1 mi (11.4 km)
- South end: I-280 in South San Francisco
- Major junctions: SR 1 in Daly City
- North end: Sloat Blvd. in San Francisco

Construction
- Construction start: 1908
- Completion: 1952
- Inauguration: 1956

Junipero Serra Boulevard is a major boulevard in and south of San Francisco named after Franciscan friar Junipero Serra. Within the city, it forms part of the route of State Route 1, the shortest connection between Interstate 280 and the Golden Gate Bridge. The remainder, in San Mateo County, was bypassed or replaced by I-280, the Junipero Serra Freeway. The boulevard was one of several new roads built along the San Francisco Peninsula before the age of freeways, and became a state highway known as Route 237 in 1956, receiving the State Route 117 designation in the 1964 renumbering, only to be deleted from the state highway system the next year. Two other regional highways—Bayshore Highway and Skyline Boulevard—were also upgraded into or bypassed by freeways.

== Route description ==
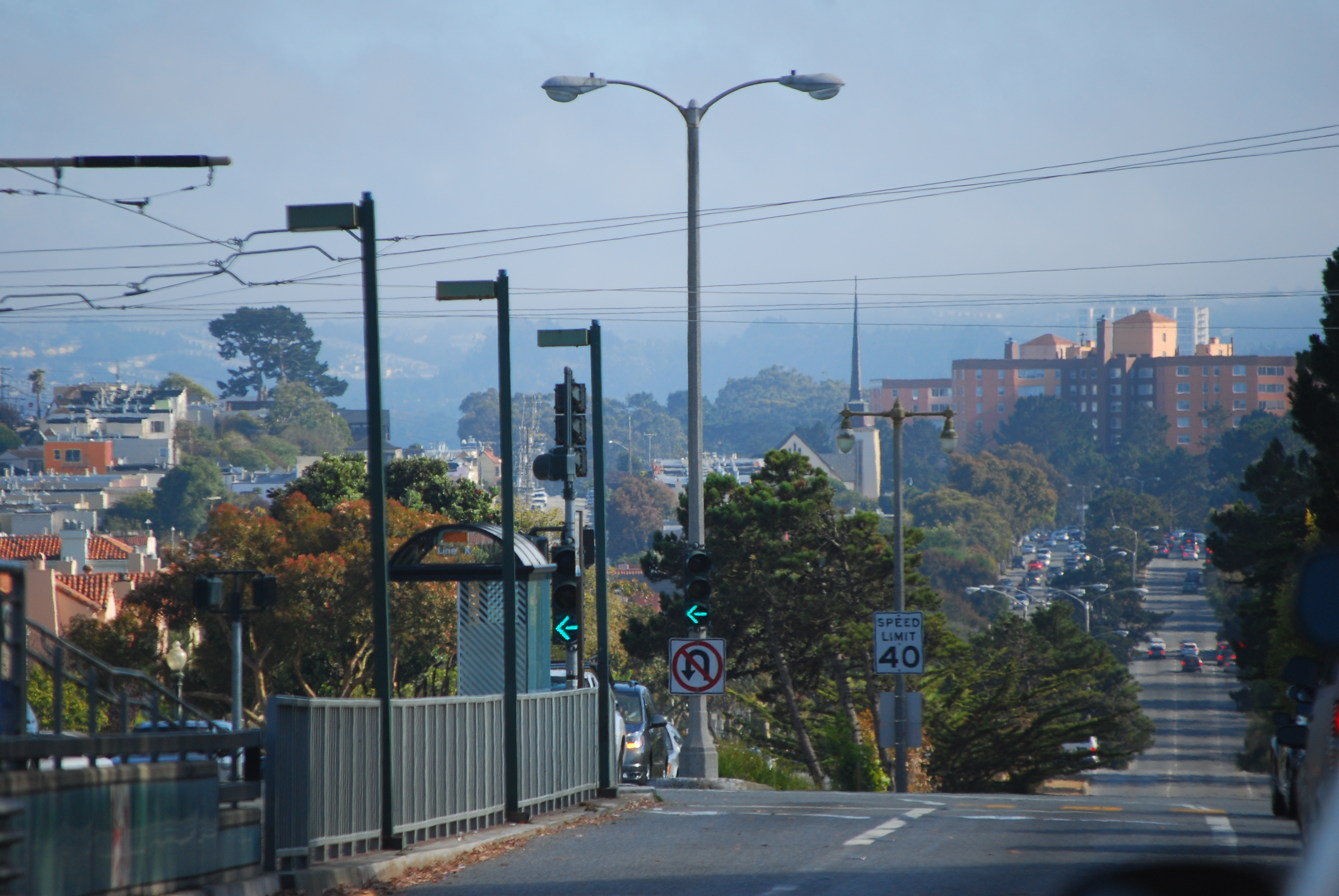
Muni Stop on Junipero Serra Blvd near 19th Avenue.

Junipero Serra Boulevard begins at exit 44 (Avalon Drive) of I-280, and travels north along the east side of I-280 as a four-lane divided highway with minimal intersections, just east of the ridge line of the San Francisco Peninsula that Skyline Boulevard (SR 35) travels along. The median ends when it crosses Hickey Boulevard; the portion of Hickey Boulevard east from Junipero Serra Boulevard to El Camino Real (SR 82) was built as part of that portion of Junipero Serra Boulevard to the north. The boulevard continues northwards with occasional intersections, some with access to I-280, before crossing to the west side of I-280 just north of Washington Street in Daly City and back to the east side north of School Street. At John Daly Boulevard, Junipero Serra Boulevard crosses I-280 for the final time and becomes part of SR 1; the northbound lanes simply cross over I-280, merging with the ramp that carries SR 1 from I-280 onto the boulevard, but southbound traffic must pass under Daly Boulevard, exit and loop over the bridge it just passed under, and then turn right onto Junipero Serra Boulevard.

Just beyond Daly Boulevard, Junipero Serra Boulevard enters San Francisco as a six-lane highway, expanding to eight lanes after the interchanges with Alemany Boulevard and Brotherhood Way. SR 1 soon turns off to the northwest onto 19th Avenue, with three lanes making the turn in each direction and six (three in each direction) remaining on the boulevard. The final section of Junipero Serra Boulevard has frontage roads for local access, and is planted with trees between the main and frontage roadways. At Ocean Avenue, the K Ingleside line of the San Francisco Municipal Railway enters the median, remaining there until the boulevard ends several blocks later at St. Francis Circle. At this five-way intersection, Sloat Boulevard heads west, St. Francis Boulevard east, Portola Drive northeast, and West Portal Avenue north-northeast, taking the rail line to the Twin Peaks Tunnel.

== History ==
Between 1899 and 1915, the city of San Francisco built an "automobile boulevard" from the end of the existing Corbett Avenue (now Portola Drive) at Ocean Avenue south past the Ingleside Race Track to the county line, where it continued to School Street in Daly City (then part of Colma). At the north end, it connected with Parkside Boulevard (now Sloat Boulevard) and Dewey Boulevard. The city Board of Supervisors named the new boulevard after Junípero Serra in 1908.

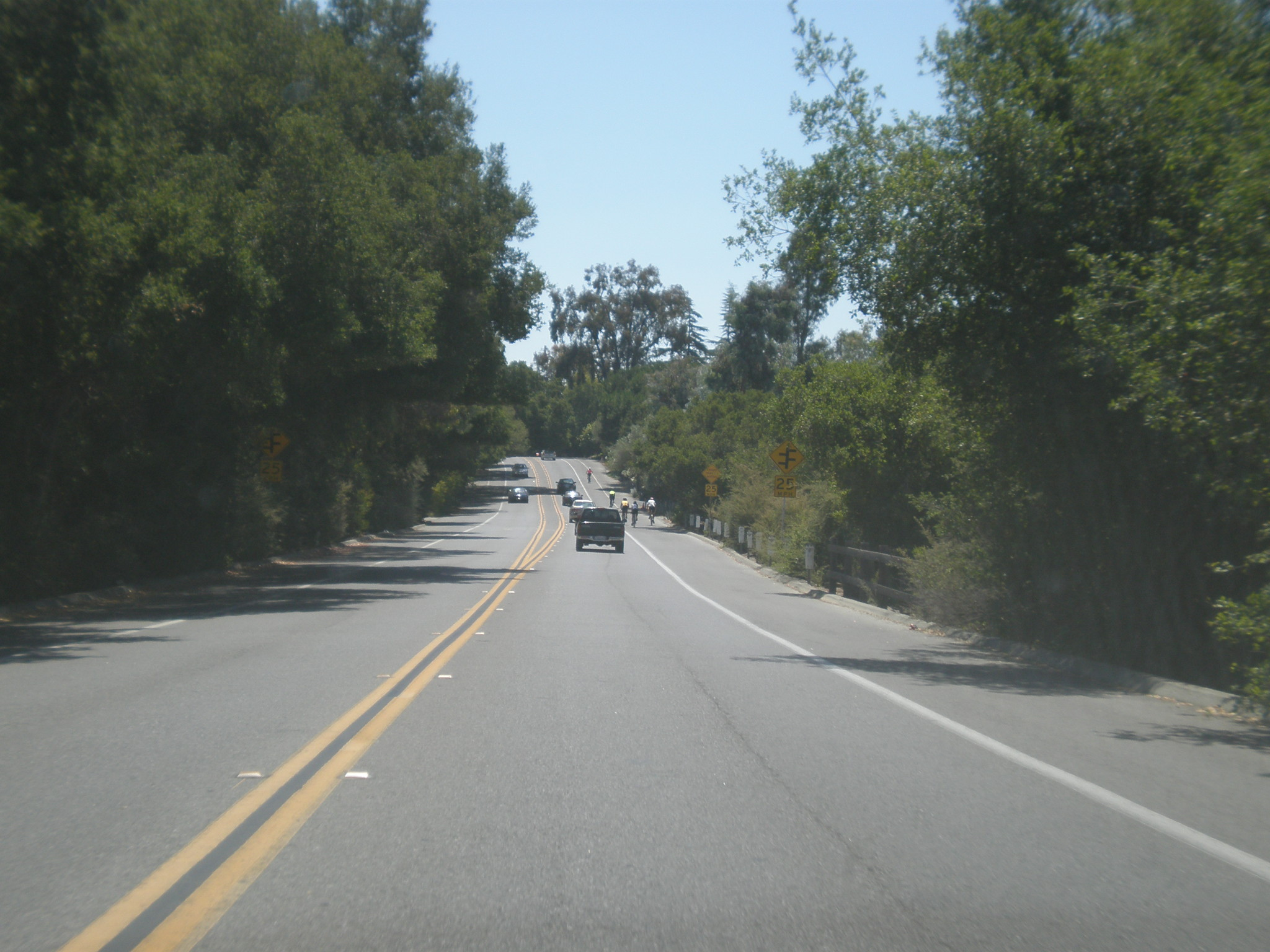
Junipero Serra Boulevard in Palo Alto.

San Francisco and San Mateo County formed Joint Highway District No. 10 on September 4, 1928 to fund and construct an extension of the boulevard south to Burlingame. An improvement of the existing road north of School Street was completed in 1930; an extension continued the roadway to Edgemar Road (now Eastmoor Avenue) in the early 1930s, and in 1933 it reached El Camino Real (US 101, now SR 82) in South San Francisco. To the south, Santa Clara County opened a section of the planned road past Stanford University on July 11, 1932. (This was never connected to the remainder, though a route that would incorporate Alameda de las Pulgas was proposed.) Construction continued at the San Mateo County end into San Bruno, opening to Sneath Lane in 1940 and Crystal Springs Road in the early 1950s; a planned continuation to Millbrae Avenue was never built. Three grade separations were built along the road: two (built ca. 1950 and still present) at Brotherhood Way and Alemany Boulevard in San Francisco and a third (built by 1947) at Washington Street in Daly City. The total cost of the road between the city line and Crystal Springs Road was over $3 million, with over half the money normally coming from San Francisco.

A 1956 law transferred the extension, from the south junction with Alemany Boulevard (now John Daly Boulevard) south to Crystal Springs Road, to the state as State Highway Route 237, and dissolved the joint highway district. (From Daly Boulevard north into San Francisco, Junipero Serra Boulevard was already a state highway, part of Route 56 (SR 1).) The stub connection to El Camino Real was turned over to the city of South San Francisco to maintain as Hickey Boulevard, which was later extended west to serve development.

By 1955, a Junipero Serra Freeway was planned, beginning at the Park Presidio Freeway near the south end of 7th Avenue, tunneling under Golden Gate Heights, and heading south into San Mateo County via Junipero Serra Boulevard. This was also included in the preliminary Interstate Highway System plans as part of a loop around the San Francisco Bay, and was added to the state highway system (as Route 239) in 1957 for this reason. The eventual path of this freeway (which was never built in San Francisco), part of I-280, generally paralleled Junipero Serra Boulevard to Crystal Springs Road, and in fact replaced the boulevard south of Avalon Drive. However, south of Crystal Springs Road, a more westerly route along Skyline Boulevard (SR 35) was chosen. The state highway along Junipero Serra Boulevard, which had become Route 117 in the 1964 renumbering, was turned back to San Mateo County in 1965. The state constructed the replacement freeway (I-280) in the mid-to-late 1960s and early 1970s, and generally preserved the old boulevard as a frontage road north of Avalon Drive, though the grade separation at Washington Street was destroyed. A short stub near Crystal Springs Road is now ramps connecting I-280 with Cunningham Way.

== Major intersections ==
This list includes the portion south of Avalon Drive that has been replaced by I-280.

County	Location	mi	km	Destinations	Notes
San Mateo	San Bruno	0.0	0.0	Crystal Springs Road	
San Mateo	San Bruno	0.3	0.48	I-280 south – San Jose	South end of I-280 overlap; southbound exit and northbound entrance
San Mateo	San Bruno	0.9	1.4	San Bruno Avenue	
San Mateo	San Bruno	1.1	1.8	I-380 east to US 101	
San Mateo	San Bruno	1.5	2.4	Sneath Lane	
San Mateo	South San Francisco	2.2	3.5	I-280 north – Daly City, San Francisco	North end of I-280 overlap; northbound exit and southbound entrance
San Mateo	South San Francisco	2.2	3.5	Avalon Drive	
San Mateo	South San Francisco	2.8	4.5	I-280 north / Westborough Boulevard – San Francisco	
San Mateo	South San Francisco	4.3	6.9	Hickey Boulevard	
San Mateo	Colma–South San Francisco line	4.7	7.6	I-280 north / Serramonte Boulevard – San Francisco	
San Mateo	Daly City	5.7	9.2	I-280 south / SR 1 south / F Street – San Jose, Pacifica	
San Mateo	Daly City	5.9	9.5	San Pedro Road, Eastmoor Avenue	
San Mateo	Daly City	6.0	9.7	I-280 north / Washington Street – San Francisco	
San Mateo	Daly City	6.4	10.3	School Street	
San Mateo	Daly City	7.2	11.6	I-280 north / John Daly Boulevard – Downtown San Francisco, Bay Bridge, Westlake District	
San Mateo	Daly City	7.3	11.7	I-280 south / SR 1 south – San Jose	South end of SR 1 overlap
City and County of San Francisco		7.6	12.2	Alemany Boulevard east – Cow Palace	
City and County of San Francisco		7.8	12.6	Brotherhood Way west	
City and County of San Francisco		8.1	13.0	SR 1 north (19th Avenue) – Golden Gate Bridge	North end of SR 1 overlap
City and County of San Francisco		9.0	14.5	Ocean Avenue	
City and County of San Francisco		9.3	15.0	Sloat Boulevard, St. Francis Boulevard, Portola Drive	
1.000 mi = 1.609 km; 1.000 km = 0.621 mi: Concurrency terminus
