= California State Route 82 =

Highway in California

State Route 82
- El Camino Real
- SR 82 highlighted in red

Route information
- Maintained by Caltrans
- Length: 42.266 mi (68.021 km) Part of SR 82 from I-880 to US 101 was relinquished in mid-2013 and is no longer included in the route.

Major junctions
- South end: I-880 in San Jose (State Maintenance)
- SR 85 in Mountain View; SR 84 in Redwood City; SR 92 in San Mateo; I-380 in San Bruno
- North end: I-280 in San Francisco

Location
- Country: United States
- State: California
- Counties: Santa Clara, San Mateo, San Francisco

Highway system
- State highways in California; Interstate; US; State; Scenic; History; Pre‑1964; Unconstructed; Deleted; Freeways
← SR 81	→ SR 83

State Route 82 (SR 82) is a state highway in the U.S. state of California that runs from Interstate 880 (I-880) in San Jose to I-280 in San Francisco following the San Francisco Peninsula. It is the spinal arterial road of the peninsula and runs parallel to the nearby Caltrain line along much of the route. For much of its length, the highway is named El Camino Real and formed part of the historic El Camino Real mission trail. The present-day routing became part of U.S. Route 101 (US 101) in 1926 before the completion of the Bayshore Freeway in 1937. The state then switched the US 101 and "Bypass (BYP) US 101" designations back and forth between El Camino Real and the Bayshore Freeway before deciding in 1964 to instead designate El Camino Real as SR 82.

SR 82 passes through and near the historic downtowns of many Peninsula cities, including Burlingame, San Mateo, Redwood City, Menlo Park, Palo Alto, Mountain View, Sunnyvale, and Santa Clara, and through some of the most walkable and transit-oriented neighborhoods in the region.

Though signs and maps may continue to mark SR 82 as running further south from I-280 to US 101 in South San Jose, control of this segment of the highway was relinquished to the city in 2013 and is thus no longer officially part of the state highway system.

== Route description ==
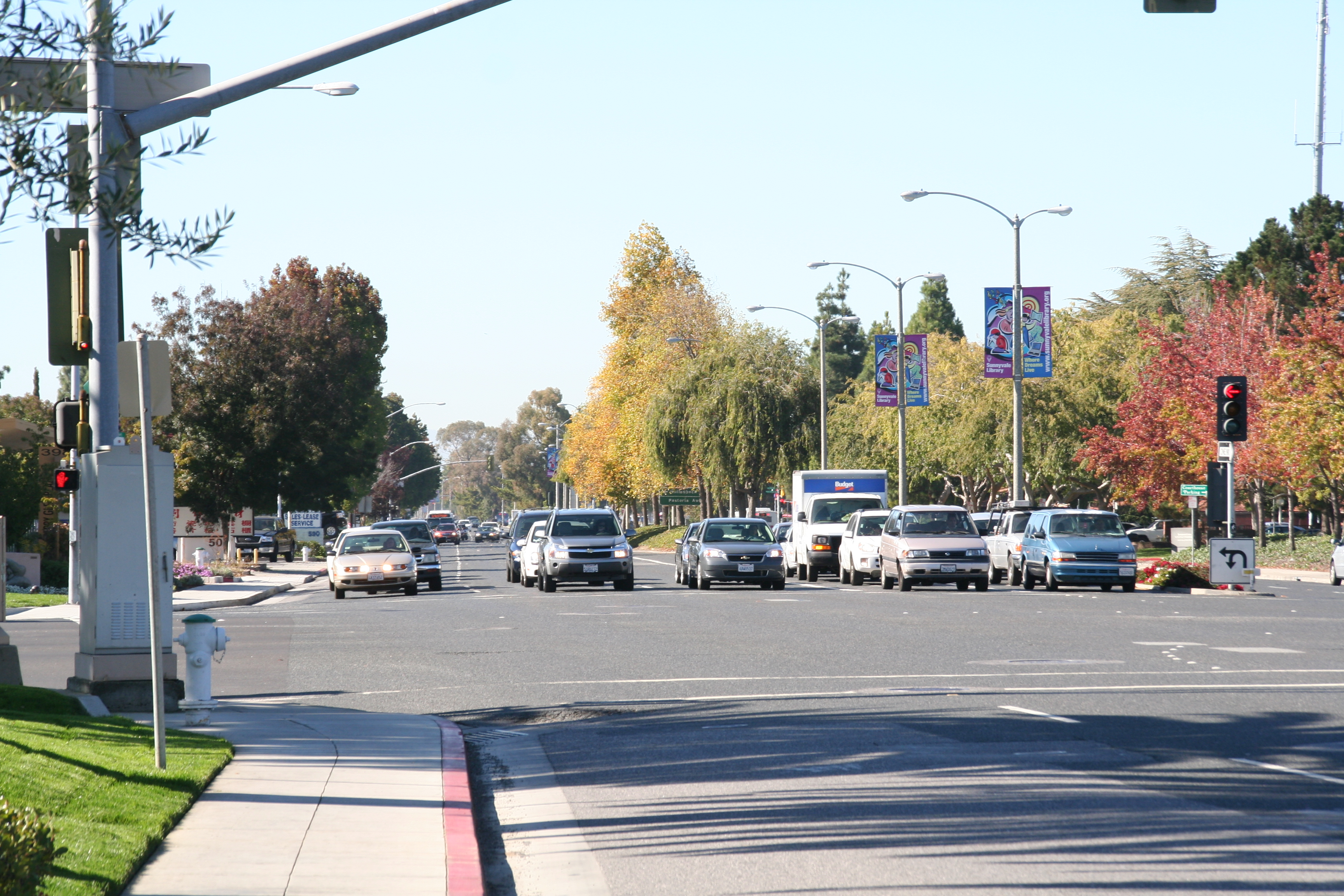
Route 82 at the intersection with Mathilda Avenue (Sunnyvale)

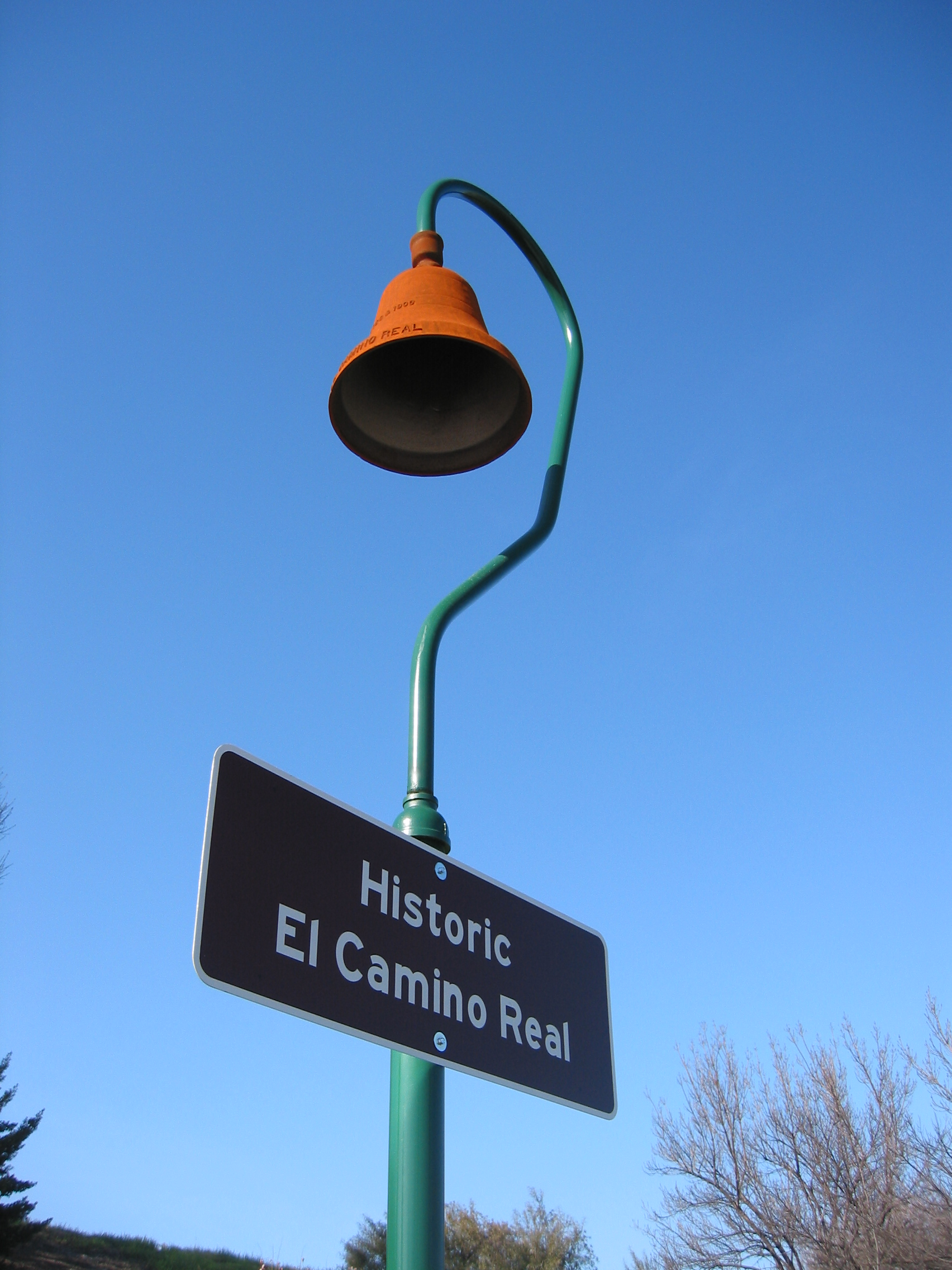
Historic El Camino Real marker in Santa Clara

Route 82 is defined in section 382, subdivision (a), of the California Streets and Highways Code, and that the highway is "from Route 880 in San Jose to Route 280 in San Francisco". Control of the former southern segment of US 101 in San Jose was relinquished by the state to the city, and subdivision (b) further mandates that the city must still "maintain within its jurisdiction signs directing motorists to the continuation of Route 82", and the segment is still eligible to be considered as a state business route.

At its south end SR 82 starts as The Alameda at I-880 in San Jose. Once it enters Santa Clara, it bends north-east around Santa Clara University and onto El Camino Real, where it continues for the remainder of its trip up the San Francisco Peninsula, paralleling the Caltrain corridor. SR 82, generally called "El Camino" by local residents, runs through a number of cities on the Peninsula, including Palo Alto (passing by Stanford University), San Carlos, San Mateo, Burlingame, and Millbrae, and it is a central artery of the Peninsula communities through which it passes.

In Daly City, SR 82 becomes Mission Street, connecting with San Francisco's Mission Street, but then quickly flows onto San Jose Avenue, crossing Alemany Boulevard, and terminating at I-280.

SR 82 takes an inland course paralleling US 101 (Bayshore Freeway). The entire route is at street level with at least four lanes of traffic; no portions of it exist as a freeway, although the route is occasionally a divided highway. US 101 and I-280 tend to provide faster alternatives than Route 82 even during traffic jams on those freeways.

SR 82 is part of the National Highway System, a network of highways that are considered essential to the country's economy, defense, and mobility by the Federal Highway Administration.

== History ==
U.S. Route 101
- Location: San Jose–San Francisco
- History: 1926–1937, 1939–1964

U.S. Route 101 Bypass
- Location: San Jose–San Francisco
- Existed: 1937–1939

Originally a segment of US 101 (and before that, the historic El Camino Real), the highway became completely inadequate for the needs of traffic with the rapid growth of the San Francisco Bay Area after World War II, including urbanization of the towns along its path. The Bayshore Highway to the east was originally built as "Bypass (BYP) US 101" and was upgraded to a freeway in 1937. With this upgrade, the original US 101 route was transferred to the Bayshore Freeway, and El Camino Real became US 101 BYP, but in response to protests, the switch in designations was reversed two years later, in 1939, and the Bayshore Freeway remained US 101 BYP until 1964.

In 1964, US 101 was moved again onto the Bayshore Freeway, and its former alignment on El Camino Real became SR 82. It was defined as two portions: From Route (US) 101 near Ford Road south of San Jose to Route (US) 101 in San Francisco (which today corresponds to the Alemany Maze), and from Route (US) 101 near Alemany Boulevard to Route (SR) 87 (current unconstructed SR 230) in San Francisco. Due to SR 87 being unconstructed in San Francisco as defined, SR 82 was extended north along Alemany Boulevard to Bayshore Boulevard. In 1968, the portions from I-280 (at current SR 82) north to US 101 and from SR 101 to SR 87 were legally transferred to I-280. SR 87 was then deleted north of SR 237 in 1980, and is only constructed south of US 101, and SR 82 today is designated as part of El Camino Real.

To connect to "Route 101 near Ford Road south of San Jose" as previously defined in 1964, SR 82 continued south past present-day-I-880 on The Alameda, becoming Santa Clara Street in Downtown San Jose, then turning south on Montgomery Street (southbound) / Autumn Street (northbound, now Barack Obama Boulevard); then it turned east on San Carlos Street and south on Market Street, which becomes First Street and then Monterey Road (or Monterey Highway). It then followed Monterey Road until it turned east briefly on Blossom Hill Road, where it ended at US 101. In 2013, control of SR 82 south of I-880 was relinquished to the City of San Jose. While certain SR 82 signs may have been removed along US 101 near Blossom Hill Road and Capitol Expressway, other SR 82 signs may still stand along I-280 and SR 87 where the relinquished segment intersects.

=== Grand Boulevard Initiative ===
The Grand Boulevard Initiative is a partnership of nineteen Bay Area transit agencies and municipalities that operate or manage various portions of the route. Although El Camino Real is ultimately under the stewardship of Caltrans, the organization nevertheless sponsors aesthetic and infrastructural improvements along the corridor and its neighboring parcels in order to revitalize the streetscape and promote density and more walkable and transit-oriented development.

== Major intersections ==
Except where prefixed with a letter, postmiles were measured on the road as it was in 1964, based on the alignment that existed at the time, and do not necessarily reflect current mileage. Postmile prefixes include: R reflecting a realignment in the route since then, M indicating a second realignment, L referring to an overlap due to a correction or change, and T indicating postmiles classified as temporary. Segments that remain unconstructed or have been relinquished to local control may be omitted. The numbers reset at county lines; the start and end postmiles in each county are given in the county column.

County	Location	Postmile	Destinations	Notes
Santa Clara; SCL R0.00-26.37	San Jose	R0.00 (Note: Postmiles are measured from SR 82's original southern end at US 101, before the segment south of I-880 was deleted and relinquished to local control. However, the City of San Jose is still required under the California Streets and Highways Code to "ensure the continuity of traffic flow on the relinquished former portion of Route 82" with the further option to apply "for approval of a business route designation".)	Silver Creek Valley Road	Continuation beyond US 101
Santa Clara; SCL R0.00-26.37	San Jose	R0.00	US 101 (Bayshore Freeway) – San Francisco, Los Angeles	Interchange; original south end of SR 82; US 101 exit 378
Santa Clara; SCL R0.00-26.37	San Jose	R0.36	Monterey Road, Blossom Hill Road (CR G10), Cottle Road	Interchange
Santa Clara; SCL R0.00-26.37	San Jose	2.81	Capitol Expressway (CR G21)	Interchange
Santa Clara; SCL R0.00-26.37	San Jose	6.06	CR G8 (Alma Avenue)	
Santa Clara; SCL R0.00-26.37	San Jose	6.90	I-280 (Sinclair Freeway)	Interchange; I-280 north exit 2, south exit 2A
Santa Clara; SCL R0.00-26.37	San Jose	R7.31	San Carlos Street, Market Street	
Santa Clara; SCL R0.00-26.37	San Jose	R7.72	SR 87 (Guadalupe Parkway)	Interchange; SR 87 north exit 6, south exit 6A
Santa Clara; SCL R0.00-26.37	San Jose	R8.08	Bird Avenue, San Carlos Street	
Santa Clara; SCL R0.00-26.37	San Jose	R8.61	Santa Clara Street	
Santa Clara; SCL R0.00-26.37	San Jose	9.91	I-880 (Nimitz Freeway) – Oakland, Santa Cruz	Interchange; south end of state maintenance; I-880 exit 2; former SR 17
Santa Clara; SCL R0.00-26.37	Santa Clara	11.38	De la Cruz Boulevard, Coleman Avenue to US 101	Interchange
Santa Clara; SCL R0.00-26.37	Santa Clara		CR G4 (San Tomas Expressway)	
Santa Clara; SCL R0.00-26.37	Santa Clara	14.30	Lawrence Expressway (CR G2)	Interchange
Santa Clara; SCL R0.00-26.37	Sunnyvale	17.04	Mathilda Avenue	Former SR 85
Santa Clara; SCL R0.00-26.37	Mountain View	18.84	SR 85 – San Francisco, Cupertino, Santa Cruz	Interchange; SR 85 exits 22A-B
Santa Clara; SCL R0.00-26.37	Mountain View	19.13	SR 237 east / Grant Road – Milpitas	SR 237 exit 1A
Santa Clara; SCL R0.00-26.37	Mountain View–Los Altos line	21.84	San Antonio Road	
Santa Clara; SCL R0.00-26.37	Palo Alto	24.04	CR G3 (Page Mill Road to Oregon Expressway)	
Santa Clara; SCL R0.00-26.37	Palo Alto	25.88	Palm Drive, University Avenue – Stanford University, Palo Alto Caltrain Station	Interchange
San Mateo; SM 0.00-25.15	Menlo Park	0.77	Santa Cruz Avenue	No left turns from SR 82
San Mateo; SM 0.00-25.15	Atherton	1.89	Atherton Avenue	
San Mateo; SM 0.00-25.15	Redwood City	3.44	SR 84 (Woodside Road) / Main Street – Woodside	Interchange
San Mateo; SM 0.00-25.15	San Carlos	6.57	Holly Street	
San Mateo; SM 0.00-25.15	Belmont	7.69	Ralston Avenue	Former Legislative Route 214
San Mateo; SM 0.00-25.15	San Mateo	9.33	Hillsdale Boulevard	Interchange
San Mateo; SM 0.00-25.15	San Mateo	10.55	SR 92 – San Mateo Bridge, Hayward, Half Moon Bay	Interchange; SR 92 exit 12A
San Mateo; SM 0.00-25.15	Burlingame	12.96	Peninsula Avenue	
San Mateo; SM 0.00-25.15	Millbrae	15.95	Millbrae Avenue	
San Mateo; SM 0.00-25.15	San Bruno	18.60	San Bruno Avenue	
San Mateo; SM 0.00-25.15	San Bruno	18.96	I-380 to US 101 / I-280 – San Francisco International Airport, San Jose, Daly City, San Francisco	Interchange; I-380 east exit 5, west exit 5C
San Mateo; SM 0.00-25.15	South San Francisco	21.91	Hickey Boulevard	
San Mateo; SM 0.00-25.15	Colma		Serramonte Boulevard	
San Mateo; SM 0.00-25.15	Daly City	24.85	John Daly Boulevard, Hillside Boulevard	
San Mateo; SM 0.00-25.15	Daly City	24.93	Mission Street	
City and County of San Francisco; SF 0.00-R0.21			Alemany Boulevard	Former SR 82 north; no left turn from SR 82 south to Alemany Boulevard
City and County of San Francisco; SF 0.00-R0.21		R0.21	I-280 north – San Francisco Civic Center, Bay Bridge	Interchange; northbound exit and southbound entrance; no direct access to I-280 south; I-280 south exit 50
City and County of San Francisco; SF 0.00-R0.21		R0.21	San Jose Avenue	Continuation beyond I-280
1.000 mi = 1.609 km; 1.000 km = 0.621 mi: Incomplete access; Route transition

== See also ==
- El Camino Real (California)
- U.S. Route 101
