= List of highways numbered 380 =

Route 380 or Highway 380 may refer to:

== Canada ==
- New Brunswick Route 380
- Newfoundland and Labrador Route 380

== Japan ==
- Japan National Route 380

== United States ==
- Interstate 380
- U.S. Route 380
- Arizona State Route 380 (cancelled proposal)
- Arkansas Highway 380
- Georgia State Route 380
- Louisiana Highway 380
- Maryland Route 380
- New York State Route 380 (former)
- Ohio State Route 380
- Oregon Route 380
- Pennsylvania Route 380
- Puerto Rico Highway 380
- Tennessee State Route 380

Preceded by 379	Lists of highways 380	Succeeded by 381
