= Alemany Maze =

Interchange in California

- Alemany Interchange
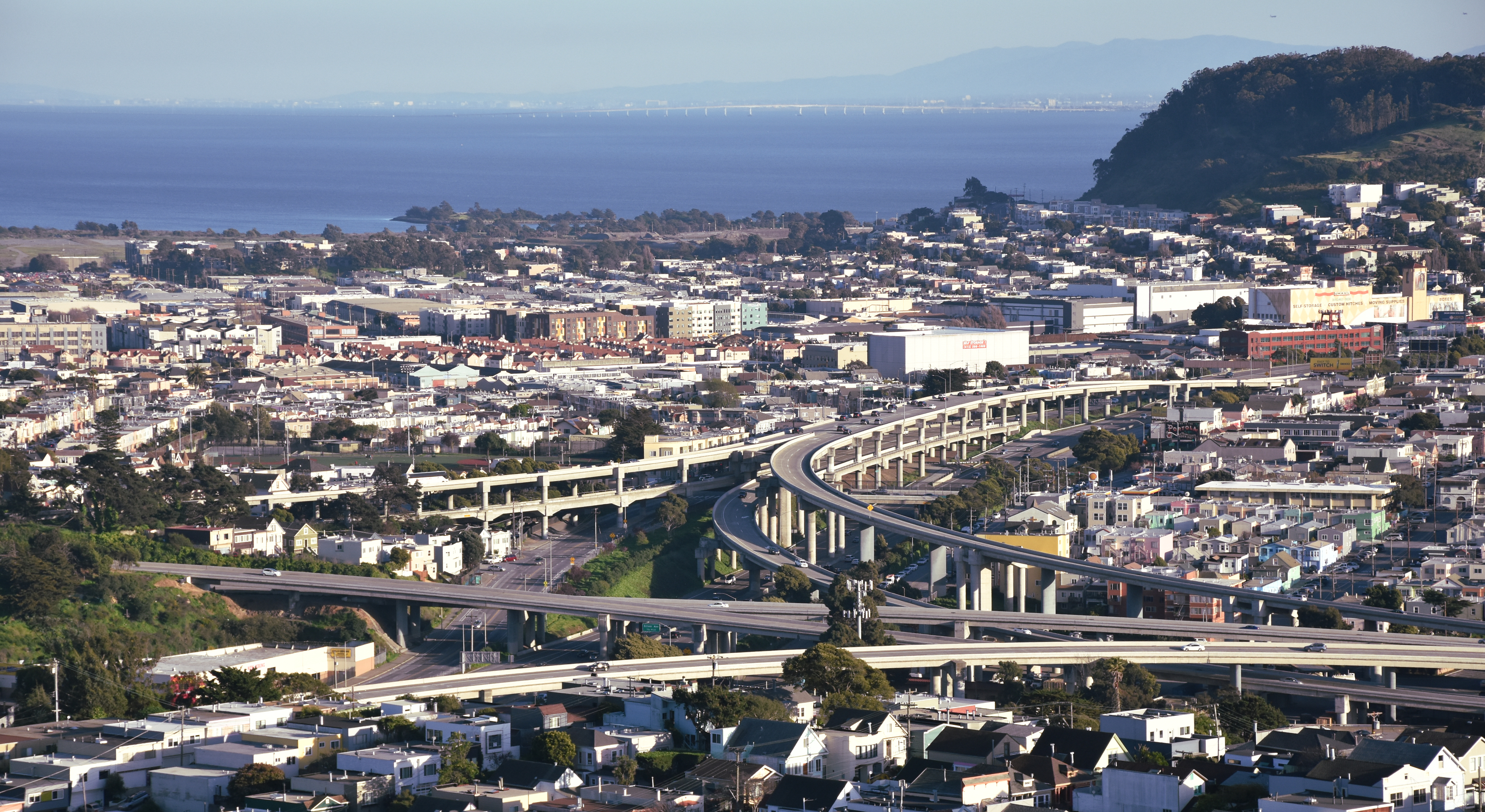
- The Alemany Maze (seen from the northwest, 2019)

Location
- San Francisco
- Coordinates: 37.7352°N 122.4068°W
- Roads at junction: US 101; I-280

Construction
- Maintained by: Caltrans

The Alemany Maze is an interchange between the James Lick Freeway (U.S. Route 101) and the John F. Foran Freeway (Interstate 280) in the city of San Francisco. Alternative names for this highway feature are Alemany Interchange and The Spaghetti Bowl.

== History ==
The Alemany Maze gets its name from Alemany Boulevard, which is named for Joseph Sadoc Alemany, who in 1853 became the first Archbishop of San Francisco.

The Alemany Maze is an interchange that originally controlled the separation of traffic travelling between the James Lick Freeway, Bayshore Boulevard, and Alemany Boulevard. The former US 101 Bypass, which followed Bayshore Boulevard to the south, separated from the old US 101 alignment at the Maze. The Alemany Boulevard routing of US 101 was eventually replaced by the construction of the Southern Freeway, later renamed the John Foran Freeway. The bridge leading US 101 over Alemany Boulevard (at a section called Alemany Circle) was constructed in 1950 and renewed in 2020. The routing of US 101 was shifted to the Bayshore Freeway in 1964, with the former US 101 freeway becoming renumbered as part of I-280.

According to SFGate, "Alemany" is pronounced "al-UH-mainy" locally.

== Maze features ==
The most notable features of the Alemany Maze are the double-deck ramps to and from US 101 from the south and the double-deck portion of I-280 northeast of the interchange. Although overall a north–south freeway, I-280 actually runs east–west through the interchange. The word maze refers to the series of interchanges necessary for a vehicle to maneuver in order to navigate their way from a multi-lane freeway to a narrower distribution structure of lanes which funnel to connector exit ramps, similar to the better known MacArthur Maze. Traffic reporters use these words combined with the Alemany Maze to indicate its bottleneck status. The San Francisco Chronicle has described it as "a spaghetti tangle of freeway" which "[l]ike a tentacled octopus [...] stretches north to the Bay Bridge and south to Daly City and San Francisco International Airport, with prongs swooshing in every direction".

In spite of its size and complexity, like the MacArthur Maze, it does not allow full freedom of movement: drivers approaching the interchange in the southbound direction on either highway cannot directly access the northbound direction of the other highway.

== See also ==
- MacArthur Maze
- Joe Colla Interchange
