= Interstate 380 =

Interstate 380 may refer to:

- Interstate 380 (California), a spur from Interstate 280 to U.S. Route 101 and the San Francisco International Airport
- Interstate 380 (Iowa), a spur from Interstate 80 that connects Iowa City and Waterloo
- Interstate 380 (Ohio), a proposed connection between Interstate 76/Interstate 77 and Interstate 271 that is currently a part of Ohio State Route 8
- Interstate 380 (Pennsylvania), a connection between Interstate 80 and Interstate 81 south of Scranton
