= Interstate 280 (California) =

Interstate highway in California

Interstate 280
- I-280 highlighted in red

Route information
- Maintained by Caltrans
- Length: 57.22 mi (92.09 km)
- Existed: September 15, 1955, by FHWA; July 1, 1964, by Caltrans–present
- Tourist routes: Junipero Serra Freeway between the San Mateo–Santa Clara county line and San Bruno
- NHS: Entire route

Major junctions
- South end: I-680 / US 101 in San Jose
- SR 87 in San Jose; I-880 / SR 17 in San Jose; SR 85 in Cupertino; SR 84 in Woodside; SR 92 near San Mateo; I-380 in San Bruno; SR 1 in Daly City; US 101 in San Francisco
- North end: King Street in San Francisco

Location
- Country: United States
- State: California
- Counties: Santa Clara, San Mateo, San Francisco

Highway system
- Interstate Highway System; Main; Auxiliary; Suffixed; Business; Future; State highways in California; Interstate; US; State; Scenic; History; Pre‑1964; Unconstructed; Deleted; Freeways
← SR 275	→ SR 281

Interstate 280 (I-280) is a 57.22-mile-long (92.09 km) major north–south auxiliary Interstate Highway in the San Francisco Bay Area of Northern California. It runs from I-680 and US Route 101 (US 101) in San Jose to King and 5th streets in San Francisco, running just to the west of the larger cities of San Francisco Peninsula for most of its route.

From I-880 in San Jose to State Route 1 (SR 1) in Daly City, I-280 was built and dedicated as the Junipero Serra Freeway, after the Spanish Franciscan friar who founded the first nine of 21 Spanish missions in California from San Diego to San Francisco. One of the dedication signs (in Daly City) still indicates that the Junipero Serra Freeway is known as the "World's Most Beautiful Freeway" due to its scenic route through the San Francisco Peninsula. From SR 1 to the James Lick Freeway (US 101) in San Francisco it is officially called the John F. Foran Freeway (after a former member of the California State Legislature). From the James Lick Freeway to its northern end at King and 5th streets, I-280 is called the Southern-Embarcadero Freeway.

== Route description ==
The entirety of I-280 is defined in section 580 of the California Streets and Highways Code as Route 280, and that the highway is from "Route 101 in San Jose to Route 80 in San Francisco via Daly City". Route 280 was never fully constructed to I-80, its parent Interstate as defined. The constructed northernmost segment of I-280 from 6th to 5th streets in San Francisco is not an Interstate Highway according to the Federal Highway Administration (FHWA)'s route logs, but is still signed as such by Caltrans.

The southern end of I-280 is at the Joe Colla Interchange with US 101 in San Jose, where it acts as a continuation of I-680 westward. In between San Jose and San Francisco, I-280 passes through Santa Clara, Cupertino, Los Altos, and Los Altos Hills before it settles along its scenic route just to the west of the cities of the San Francisco Peninsula in San Mateo County and just to the east of the Santa Cruz Mountains. I-280 reemerges in a decidedly urbanized area in the city of San Bruno, passing through South San Francisco and Daly City before it runs across a southeastern swath of the city of San Francisco on the way to its northern terminus.

The segment of the Junipero Serra Freeway between Cupertino (SR 85) and Daly City (SR 1) has been called the "World's Most Beautiful Freeway" since its dedication in the 1960s. Drivers along this portion of I-280 are treated to scenic views of the Santa Cruz Mountains to the west and, at a few points, San Francisco Bay to the east and are isolated by hills from the cities to the east. Through much of this segment, the freeway is actually running just inside the eastern rim of the rift valley of the San Andreas Fault. A particularly attractive six-mile (9.7 km) stretch of the freeway from Hillsborough to Belmont provides a view at Crystal Springs Reservoir, formed by water piped over 160 miles (260 km) from Hetch Hetchy Valley in Yosemite National Park, partly filling the rift valley. The waters are impounded by Crystal Springs Dam, which drains into San Francisco Bay via San Mateo Creek; I-280 crosses the deep valley formed by this creek on the Doran Memorial Bridge, completed in 1969.

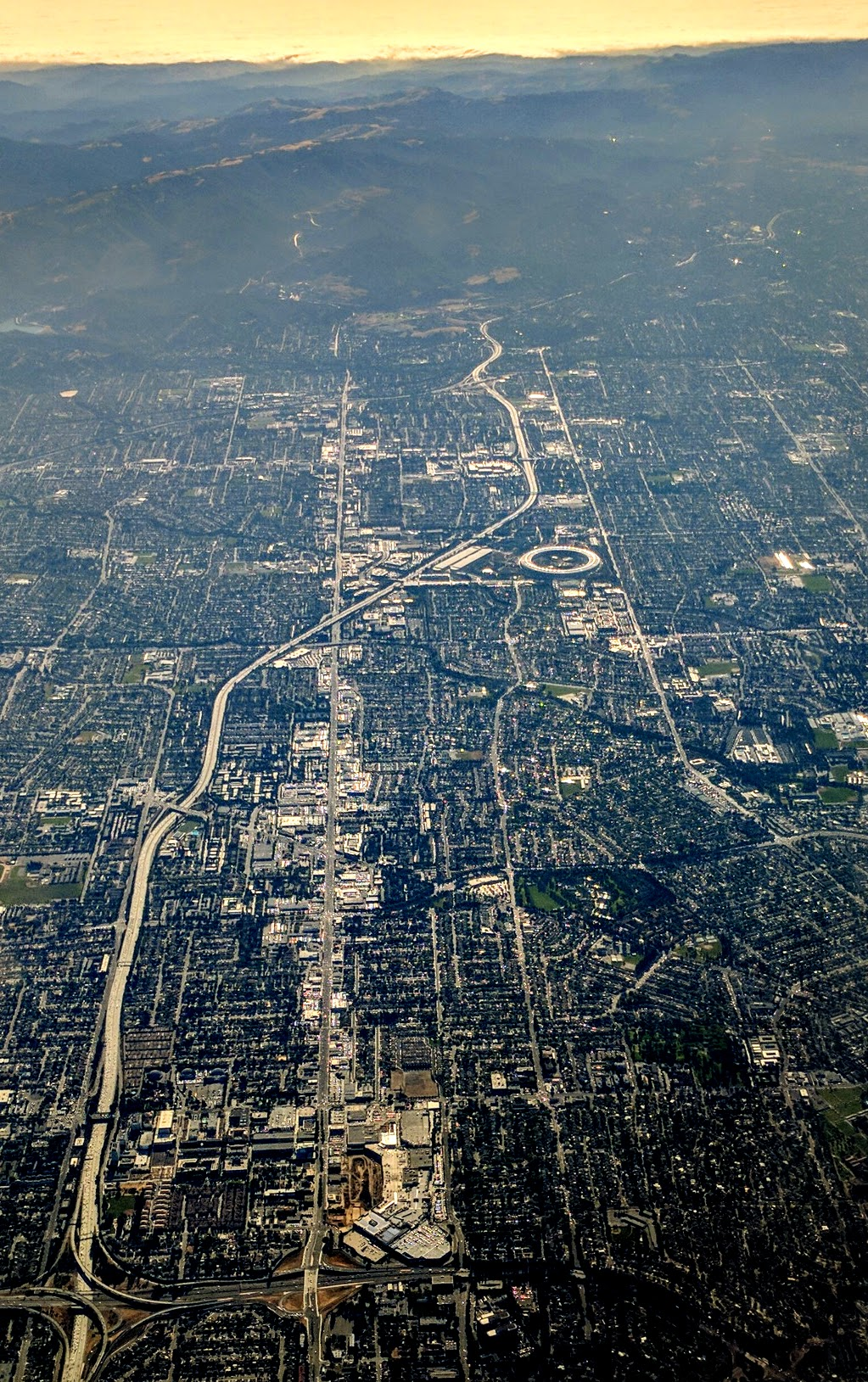
Aerial view of I-280 as it winds across Cupertino

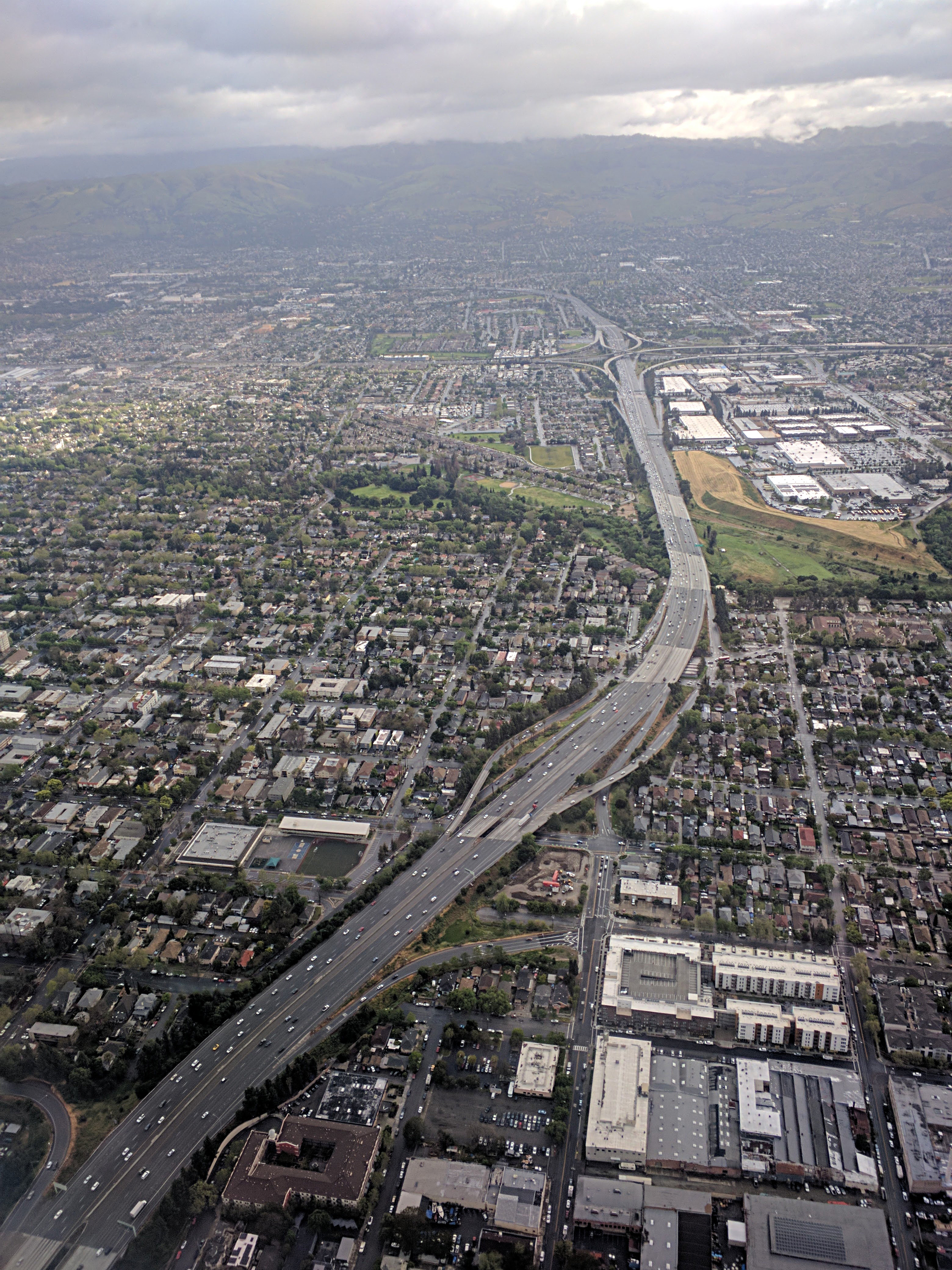
Aerial view of I-280 in San Jose, looking northeast toward the Joe Colla Interchange (I-680/US 101) in the distance

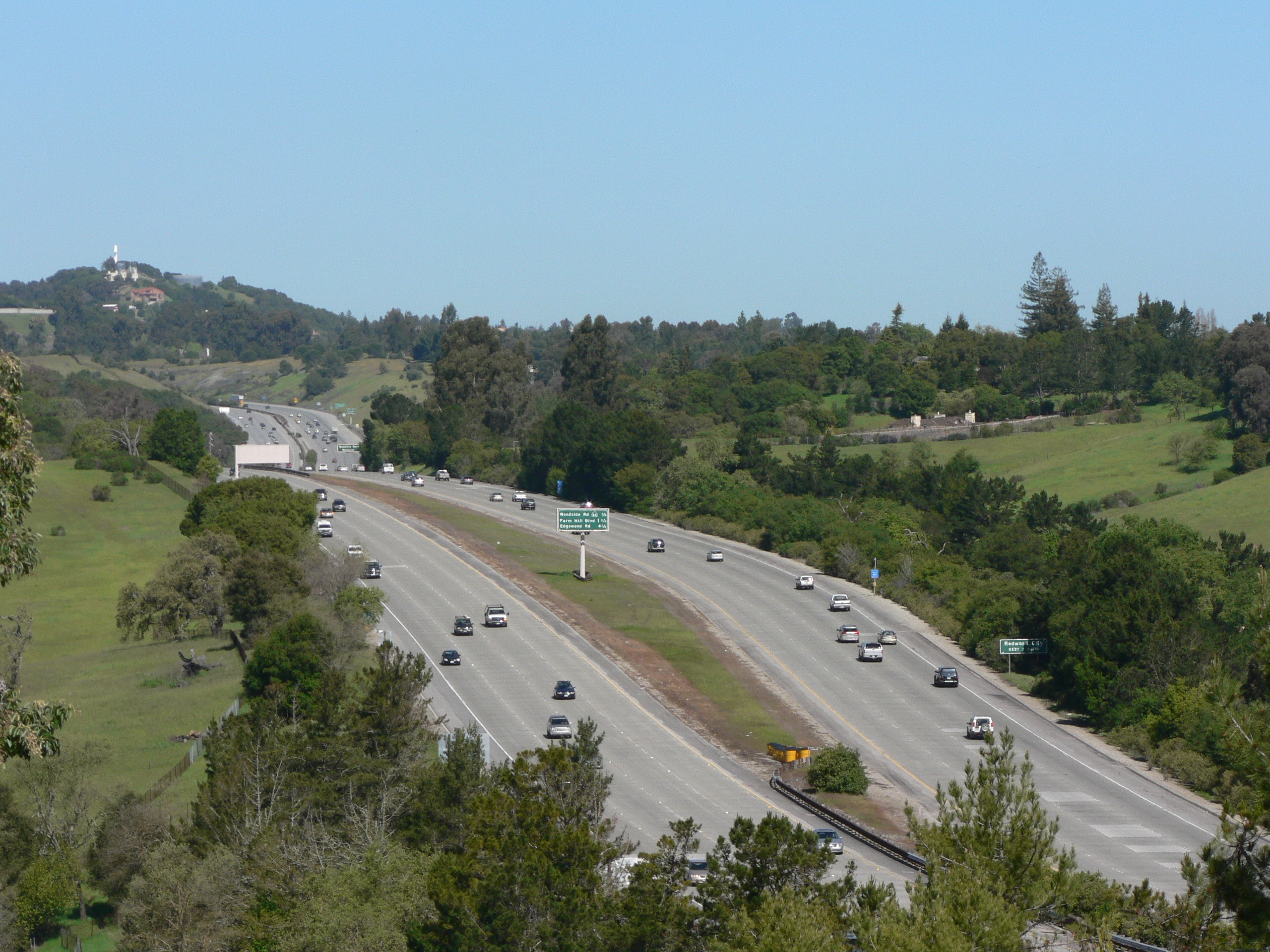
I-280 near Stanford University

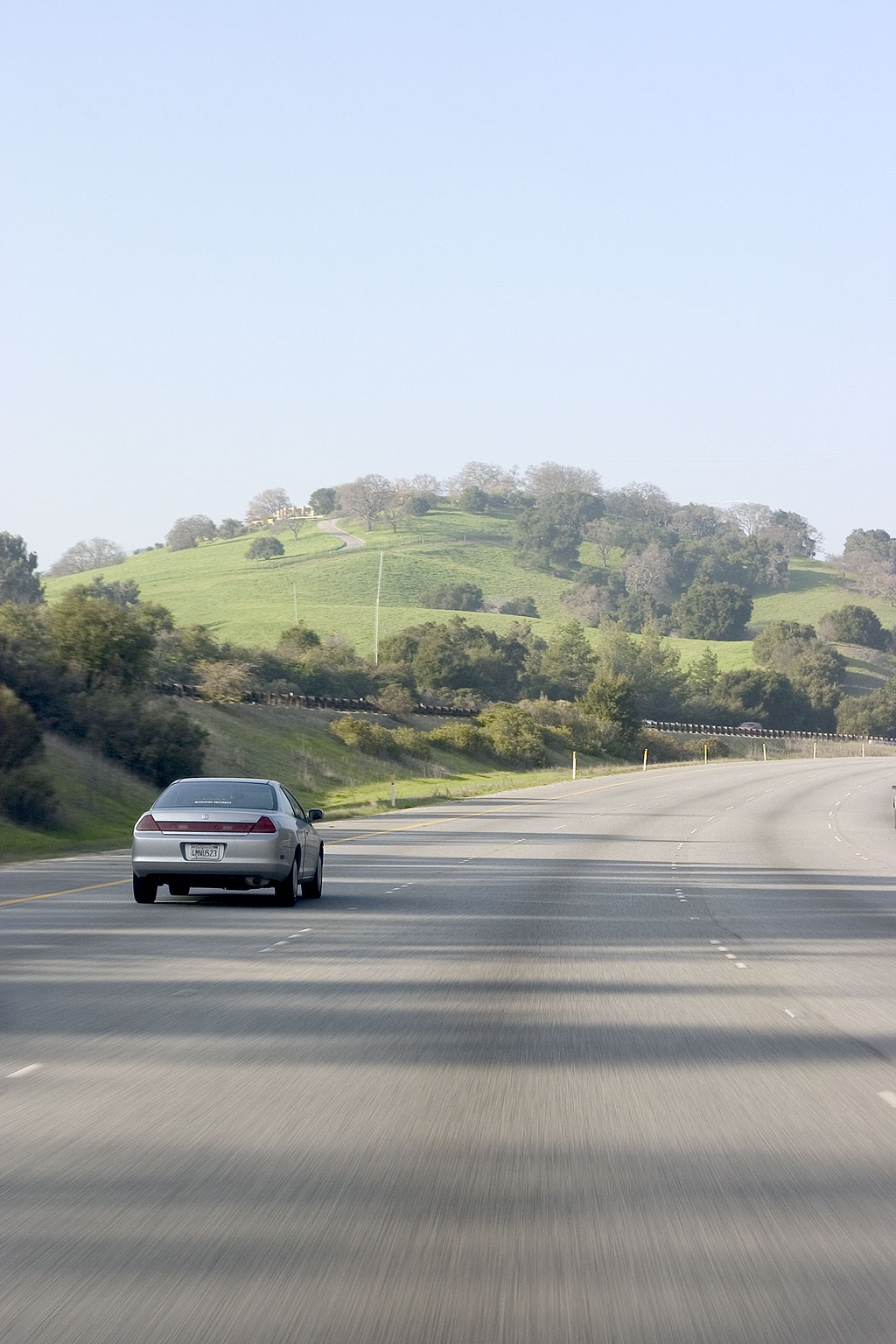
Scenic portion of I-280

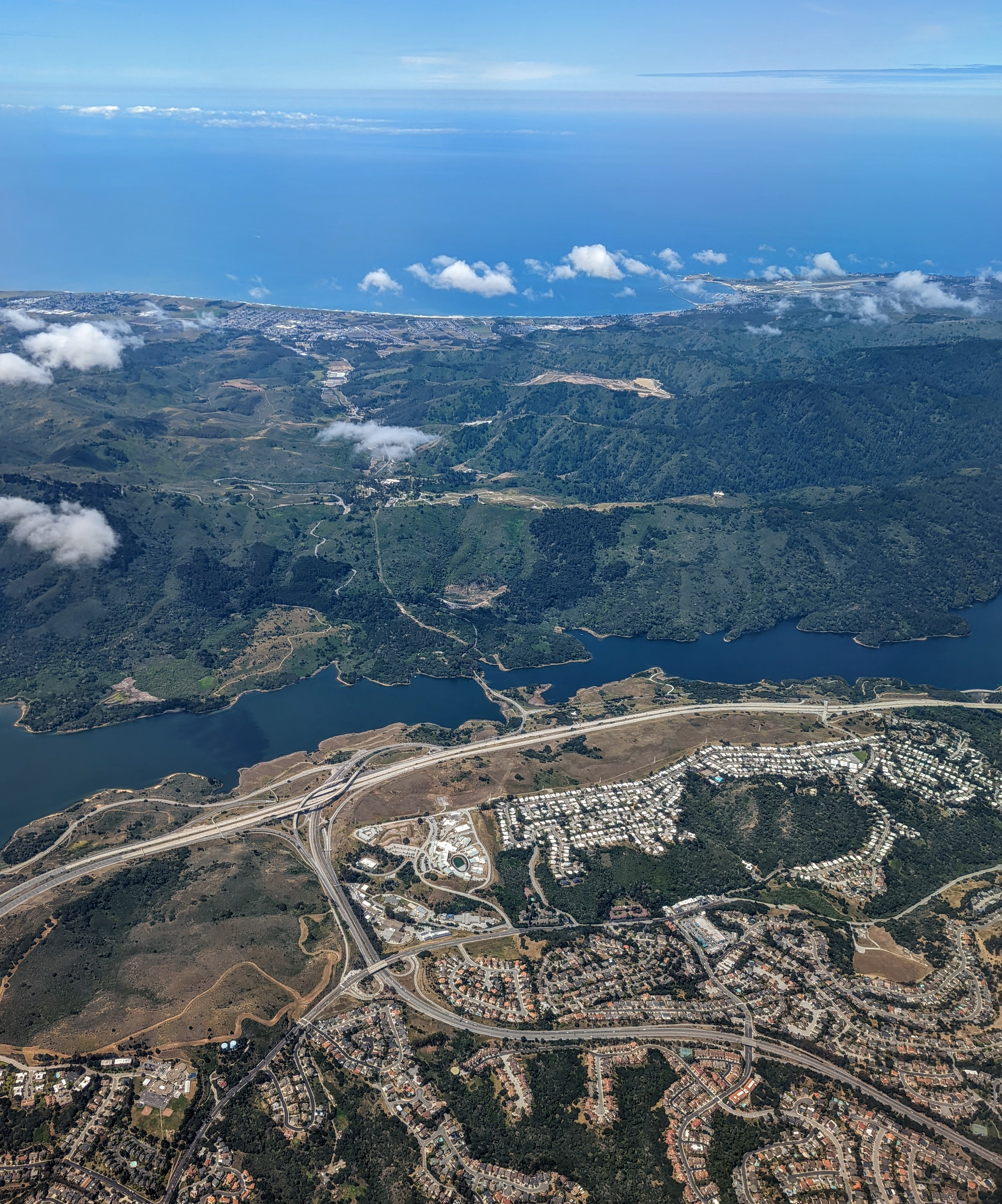
Aerial view directed west showing interchange with SR 92; Crystal Springs Reservoir runs north-south parallel to I-280 through the middle of the photograph

For nearly all of its length, I-280 runs roughly parallel and several miles to the west of US 101 (Bayshore Freeway). Both freeways are north–south routes connecting San Jose with San Francisco; however, unlike I-280, the route that US 101 takes between the two cities goes entirely through urbanized areas. The vast majority of the population of the San Francisco Peninsula lives somewhere between I-280 and US 101.

Although it was originally intended to do so, I-280 does not intersect with I-80, its parent Interstate. The northern terminus of I-280 is within about a mile (1.6 km) of I-80's western terminus (at the interchange with US 101), but the two Interstates do not directly connect; instead, I-280 complies with numbering conventions by virtue of its interchanges with the southern ends of I-680 and I-880, both of which connect to I-80 at their northern terminuses. Although San Francisco planned and has had several opportunities to connect I-280 to I-80, it has chosen to use the money for other purposes. Instead, I-280's northernmost extension, which includes a significant double-deck section (with northbound traffic on the lower deck and southbound traffic on the upper), primarily functions now as a spur into the Financial District, San Francisco, as suggested by signage on northbound US 101 at the Alemany Maze.

Major intersections include US 101 and SR 1 in San Francisco, I-380 in San Bruno, SR 92 in San Mateo, SR 85 in Cupertino, and I-880 and I-680 and US 101 in San Jose.

I-280 is part of the California Freeway and Expressway System and is part of the National Highway System, a network of highways that are considered essential to the country's economy, defense, and mobility by the Federal Highway Administration (FHWA). I-280 is eligible for the State Scenic Highway System and, from the San Mateo–Santa Clara county line to the San Bruno city limits, is officially designated as a scenic highway by the California Department of Transportation (Caltrans), meaning that it is a substantial section of highway passing through a "memorable landscape" with no "visual intrusions", where the potential designation has gained popular favor with the community. The Junipero Serra Freeway is the name of I-280 from SR 1 in San Francisco to SR 17, as named by Assembly Concurrent Resolution 140, Chapter 208 in 1967, in honor of Spanish missionary Junípero Serra, who founded many of California's missions in the 18th century. I-280 from its southern terminus at US 101 and I-680 north to I-880 in San Jose is part of the Sinclair Freeway (named after Joseph P. Sinclair, District Engineer for District 4 California Division of Highways). A 26-foot (7.9 m) high faux-sandstone statue of Serra was placed at the Crystal Springs Rest Area in 1975. Visible in both directions from the highway, it was removed by Caltrans in 2025. According to an official statement, "The installation did not meet current Transportation Art Program requirements and had been a frequent target of graffiti and vandalism."

The SLAC National Accelerator Laboratory, a research center operated by Stanford University, houses a 2-mile-long linear accelerator that extends underground, running 30 feet below I-280 near the Sand Hill Road exit in Menlo Park.

== History ==
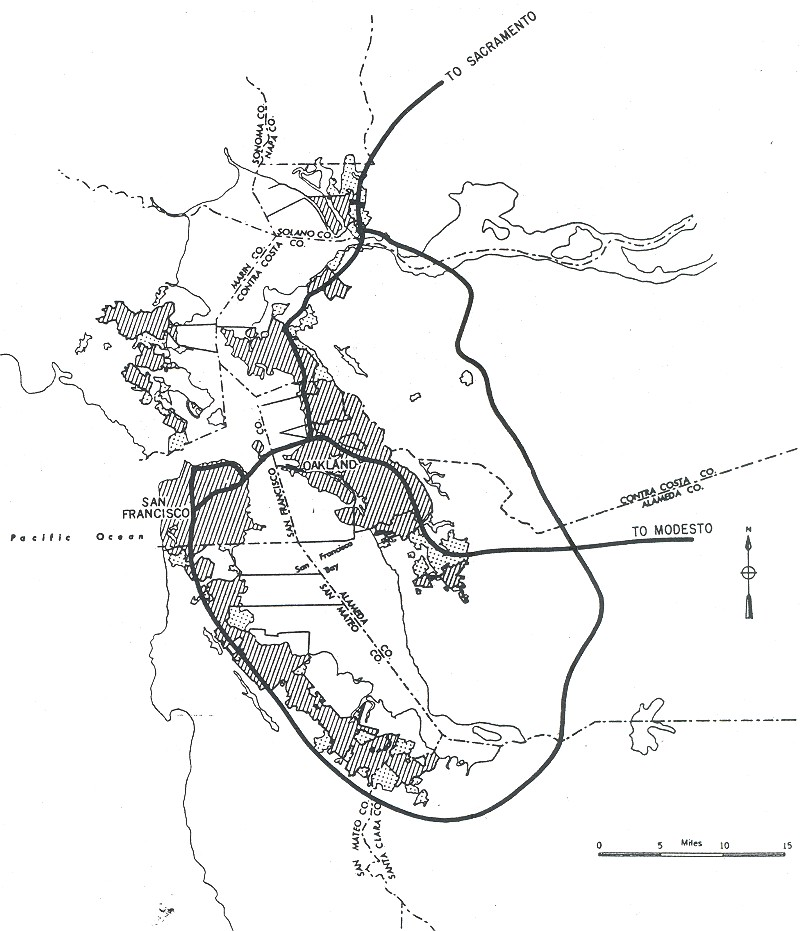
1955 map of the planned Interstates in the San Francisco Bay Area. These early plans essentially called for an Interstate loop route that would head south down the San Francisco Peninsula from San Francisco to San Jose, then head north through the eastern cities of the East Bay to Vallejo. This route now basically comprises present-day I-280, I-680, and I-780.

I-280 was added to the Interstate Highway System on September 15, 1955, as a route from San Jose north to San Francisco. This ran along the present alignment of I-280 south of San Francisco, but, in San Francisco, it was instead intended to run north parallel to SR 1, past the planned west end of I-80 which would have been at the junction with the Panhandle Freeway just south of Fulton and Park Presidio, along what would have been the Park Presidio Freeway north to the south approach to the Golden Gate Bridge. At that point, I-280 would have met I-480 (Embarcadero Freeway), which would have headed east on Doyle Drive (US 101), the Golden Gate Freeway, and onto the Embarcadero Freeway to reach the San Francisco–Oakland Bay Bridge. I-480 would have continued south on the never-built section of the Southern-Embarcadero Freeway from Folsom and the Embarcadero to 5th and King streets, then along the present Southern-Embarcadero Freeway to meet the Southern Freeway (now I-280) near the Alemany Maze, which served as the US 101 Bypass until I-280 was built. The I-280 number was approved on November 10, 1958.

In the 1964 renumbering, I-280's legislative designation was officially applied to the planned route. This replaced SR 1 in San Francisco; the new SR 1 alignment turned northeast where I-280 now runs, quickly ending at SR 82 (San Jose Avenue/Alemany Boulevard). SR 1, however, continued to be signed along its former (and current) alignment, which had not been upgraded to freeway standards.

A realignment approved January 1968 primarily took I-280's legislative definition onto its current route. This new routing ran along what had been SR 1, SR 82, SR 87, and I-480 (downgraded to SR 480 then), ending at I-80 at the western Bay Bridge approach. This change was made on the state level in 1968, restoring SR 1 to its current alignment and truncating SR 82, SR 87 and SR 480.

For the scenic portion, the section of I-280 between SR 85 (Cupertino) and SR 84 (Woodside) was completed in the late 1960s alongside SR 85. The section between SR 92 (San Mateo) and SR 84 was not completed until the 1970s. Until then, traffic was routed on Cañada Road between the two ends.

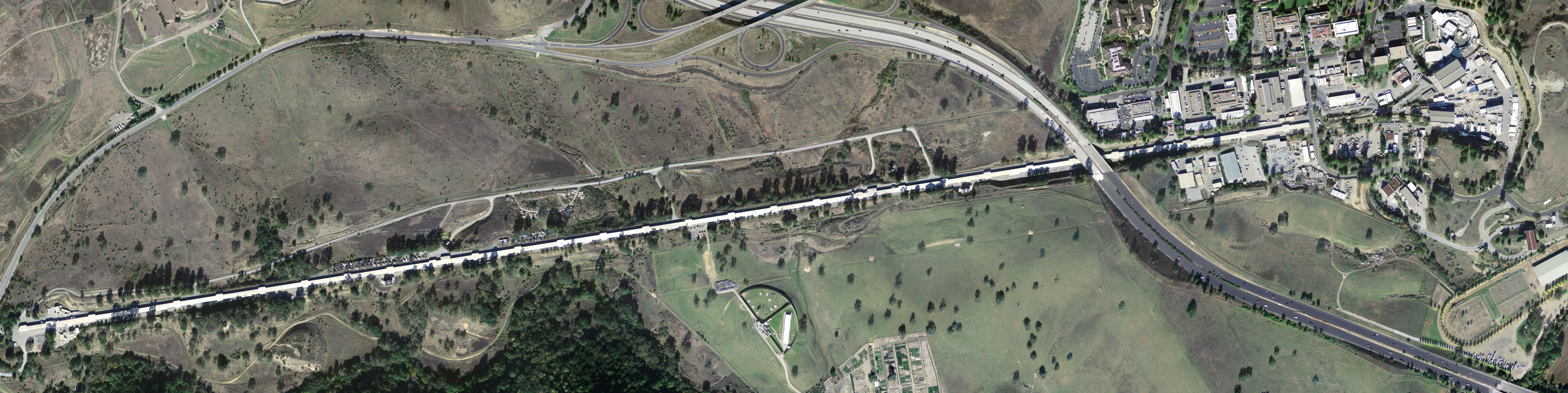
Aerial photo of the Stanford Linear Accelerator Center, showing the 2-mile building housing the accelerator beamline, which passes under I-280.

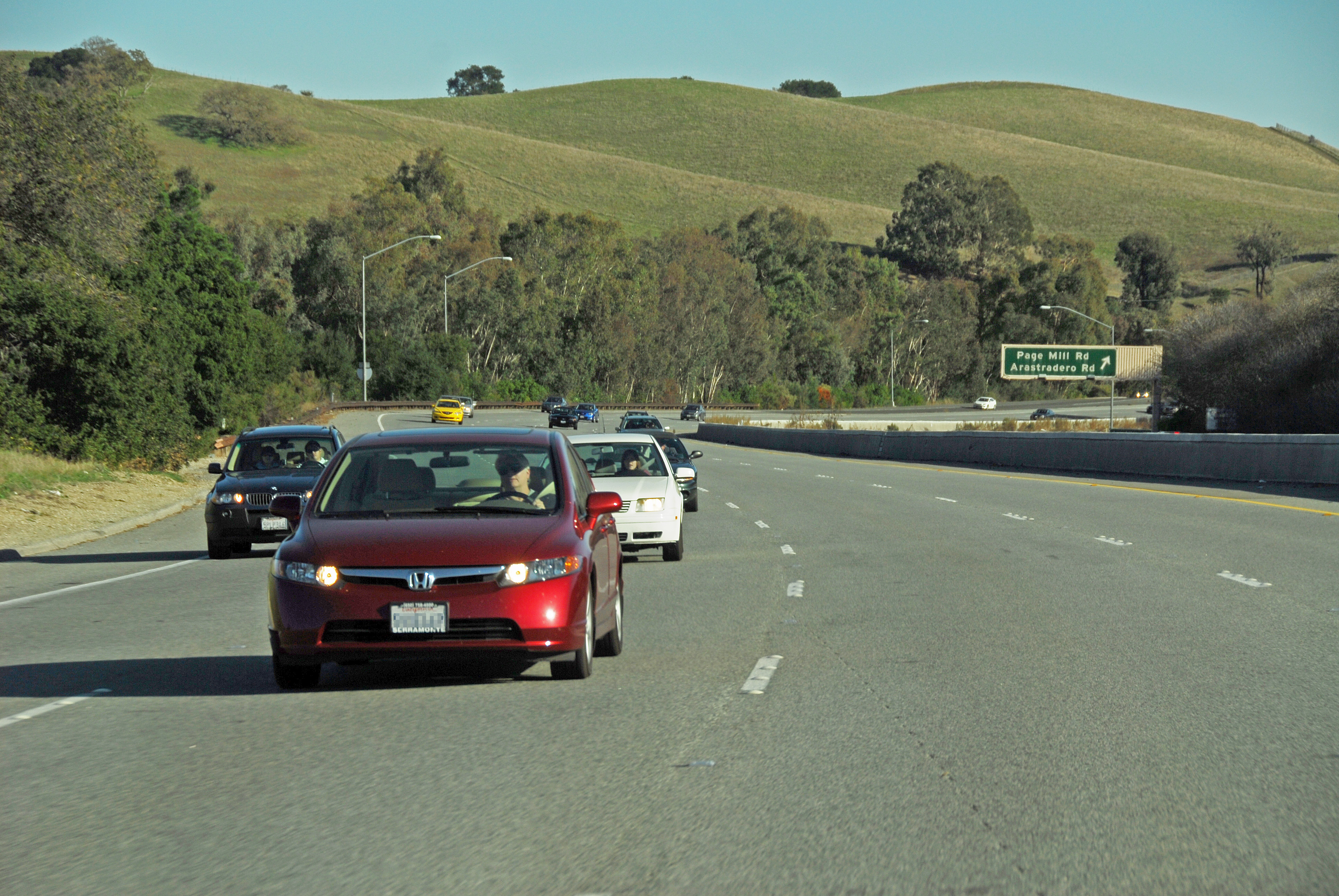
Cars driving near Page Mill Road on I-280

A direct freeway connection between I-280 and I-80 was never completed. I-280 was planned to run along The Embarcadero underneath the Bay Bridge approach/I-80 to connect to SR 480 and then loop back to the Bay Bridge approach/I-80 near 1st Street. The segment of I-280 between 3rd Street and SR 480 was never built, leaving the I-280 structure terminating in midair at 3rd Street, with ramp stubs at 5th Street that were intended to connect to a parallel bay bridge (also not built). This caused the completed freeway segment from the Bay Bridge approach/I-80 near 1st Street to The Embarcadero to be signed as part of SR 480 instead of I-280. After the 1989 Loma Prieta earthquake, plans to connect I-280 to I-80 were abandoned, the earthquake-damaged Embarcadero Freeway was torn down in 1991, and the north end of I-280 was reconfigured to the present-day King Street on/offramps in 1997.

The interchange at the beginning of I-280 at I-680 and US 101 in San Jose was built years before its completion. The three flyovers, with no connecting ramps, stood as a 110-foot-tall (34 m) monument to inefficiency for years in the 1970s, becoming the butt of jokes. The highlight prank occurred in January 1976, when a 1960 Chevrolet Impala was placed on the highest bridge overnight, where it obviously would be impossible to drive. The following day, San Jose City Councilmember Joe Colla was photographed standing next to the car, an image that appeared in many newspapers. It has been suggested this stunt nudged the state of California to find the funds to complete the freeway. The ramps opened five years later in 1981. In 2010, a resolution was introduced in the state legislature to name it the Joe Colla Interchange in memory of the late councilmember.

In 2021 University of California, Davis, researchers published a report on wildlife-vehicle collisions based on California Highway Patrol and insurance data over the past five years, according to which five of the 20 one-mile (1.6 km) stretches of highway in the state with the highest costs for this reason are on I-280, the worst being between San Bruno and Cupertino.

== Exit list ==
County	Location	mi	km	Exit	Destinations	Notes
Santa Clara	San Jose	0.00	0.00	—	I-680 north (Sinclair Freeway) – Sacramento	Southern terminus; Joe Colla Interchange; US 101 north exit 384, south exit 385B; Sinclair Freeway continues east as I-680 north
Santa Clara	San Jose	0.00	0.00	—	US 101 north (Bayshore Freeway) – San Francisco	Southern terminus; Joe Colla Interchange; US 101 north exit 384, south exit 385B; Sinclair Freeway continues east as I-680 north
Santa Clara	San Jose	0.00	0.00	—	US 101 south (Bayshore Freeway) – Los Angeles	Southern terminus; Joe Colla Interchange; US 101 north exit 384, south exit 385B; Sinclair Freeway continues east as I-680 north
Santa Clara	San Jose	0.36	0.58	1A	McLaughlin Avenue	Southbound exit and northbound entrance
Santa Clara	San Jose	1.29	2.08	1B	11th Street, 10th Street	Signed as exit 1 northbound
Santa Clara	San Jose	1.55	2.49	2A	7th Street, Virginia Street to SR 82	Signed as exit 2 northbound; Virginia Street not signed northbound
Santa Clara	San Jose	2.20	3.54	2B	Almaden Boulevard, Vine Street	Southbound exit and northbound entrance
Santa Clara	San Jose	2.52	4.06	3A	SR 87 (Guadalupe Parkway)	SR 87 exit 5
Santa Clara	San Jose	2.88	4.63	3B	Bird Avenue	
Santa Clara	San Jose	3.88	6.24	4	Race Street, Southwest Expressway	Northbound exit and southbound entrance
Santa Clara	San Jose	3.99	6.42	4	Meridian Avenue	Southbound exit and northbound entrance
Santa Clara	San Jose	4.99	8.03	5A	Leigh Avenue, Bascom Avenue	
Santa Clara	San Jose	5.41	8.71	5B	I-880 north (Nimitz Freeway) / SR 17 south – Oakland, Santa Cruz	West end of the Sinclair Freeway, south end of Junipero Serra Freeway; SR 17 north exits 27A-B; I-880 south exit 1B
Santa Clara	San Jose	5.41	8.71	5C	Stevens Creek Boulevard, West San Carlos Street	Northbound exit and southbound entrance
Santa Clara	San Jose	5.95	9.58	6	Winchester Boulevard	Southbound exit and northbound entrance
Santa Clara	San Jose	7.33	11.80	7	Saratoga Avenue – Saratoga	
Santa Clara	San Jose	8.51	13.70	9	Lawrence Expressway (CR G2), Stevens Creek Boulevard	
Santa Clara	Cupertino	9.76	15.71	10	Wolfe Road	Serves Apple Park
Santa Clara	Cupertino	10.82	17.41	11	De Anza Boulevard	Former SR 85
Santa Clara	Cupertino	12.12	19.51	12A	SR 85 north – Mountain View	SR 85 north exit 19, south exit 19A
Santa Clara	Cupertino	12.12	19.51	12B	SR 85 south – Santa Cruz, Gilroy	SR 85 north exit 19, south exit 19A
Santa Clara	Los Altos	12.83	20.65	13	Foothill Expressway (CR G5), Grant Road	
Santa Clara		15.48	24.91	15	Magdalena Avenue	
Santa Clara	Los Altos Hills	16.43	26.44	16	El Monte Road, Moody Road	
Santa Clara		19.76	31.80	20	Page Mill Road (CR G3), Arastradero Road – Palo Alto	Arastradero Road not signed northbound; Palo Alto not signed southbound
Santa Clara		22.00	35.41	22	Alpine Road – Portola Valley	
San Mateo		23.62	38.01	24	Sand Hill Road	
San Mateo	Woodside	25.34	40.78	25	SR 84 (Woodside Road)	
San Mateo	Woodside	26.65	42.89	27	Farm Hill Boulevard	
San Mateo	Woodside	28.60	46.03	—	Cañada Road	Entrances only
San Mateo		28.66	46.12	29	Edgewood Road	
San Mateo				Ralph D. Percival Memorial Vista Point (northbound only)		
San Mateo				Former rest area (northbound only; closed)		
San Mateo				Gate Vista Point		
San Mateo		32.84	52.85	33	SR 92 – San Mateo, Hayward, Half Moon Bay	Southbound exit to SR 92 west is via exit 34; SR 92 east exits 8A-B, west exit 8
San Mateo		34.33	55.25	34	SR 35 south to SR 92 west / Bunker Hill Drive – Half Moon Bay	South end of SR 35 overlap
San Mateo	San Mateo Creek	35.27	56.76	Doran Memorial Bridge		
San Mateo		35.43	57.02	Crystal Springs Rest Area (northbound only)		
San Mateo	Hillsborough	36.24	58.32	36	Black Mountain Road, Hayne Road	
San Mateo		39.17	63.04	39	Trousdale Drive	
San Mateo	Millbrae	39.67	63.84	40	Millbrae Avenue	Northbound exit and southbound entrance
San Mateo	Millbrae	40.53	65.23	41	Larkspur Drive, Millbrae Avenue	Southbound exit and northbound entrance
San Mateo	San Bruno	41.29	66.45	41	SR 35 north (Skyline Boulevard) – Pacifica	North end of SR 35 overlap; northbound exit and southbound entrance
San Mateo	San Bruno	42.28	68.04	42	Crystal Springs Road	Southbound exit and northbound entrance; former SR 117
San Mateo	San Bruno	42.75	68.80	43A	San Bruno Avenue, Sneath Lane	Southbound exit and northbound entrance
San Mateo	San Bruno	42.75– 43.02	68.80– 69.23	43	I-380 east to US 101 – San Francisco International Airport	Signed as exit 43A southbound, 43B northbound; I-380 exits 5A-B
San Mateo	San Bruno	43.02	69.23	43B	Sneath Lane, San Bruno Avenue	Northbound exit and southbound entrance
San Mateo	South San Francisco	44.05	70.89	44	Avalon Drive, Westborough Boulevard	Northbound exit and southbound entrance; former SR 117
San Mateo	South San Francisco	44.63	71.83	45	Westborough Boulevard	Northbound exit as well as southbound entrance from westbound Westborough Blvd. are via exit 44
San Mateo	Daly City	46.20	74.35	46	Hickey Boulevard	
San Mateo	Daly City	46.83	75.37	47A	Serramonte Boulevard	Southbound exit and northbound entrance
San Mateo	Daly City	47.29	76.11	47	SR 1 south / Eastmoor Avenue – Pacifica	Northbound signage; SR 1 north exits 509B and 510
San Mateo	Daly City	47.29	76.11	47B	SR 1 south – Pacifica	Southbound signage; south end of SR 1 overlap; SR 1 north exit 509B
San Mateo	Daly City	47.78	76.89	48	Eastmoor Avenue, Sullivan Avenue	Southbound exit and northbound entrance
San Mateo	Daly City	48.51	78.07	49A	John Daly Boulevard, Junipero Serra Boulevard	Signed as exit 49 southbound
San Mateo	Daly City	49.17	79.13	49B	SR 1 north (19th Avenue) – Golden Gate Bridge	North end of SR 1 overlap; northbound left exit and southbound entrance; SR 1 south exit 511
City and County of San Francisco		50.18	80.76	50	SR 82 to SR 1 north / Mission Street, San Jose Avenue	Southbound exit and northbound entrance
City and County of San Francisco		51.21	82.41	51	Geneva Avenue, Ocean Avenue	
City and County of San Francisco		52.13	83.90	52	Monterey Boulevard	Southbound exit and northbound entrance
City and County of San Francisco		52.14	83.91	52	San Jose Avenue, Bosworth Street	Northbound exit and southbound entrance
City and County of San Francisco		52.72	84.84	53	Alemany Boulevard, Mission Street	Mission Street not signed northbound
City and County of San Francisco		53.78	86.55	54A	US 101 south (James Lick Freeway) – San Jose	Southern end of Alemany Maze; signed as exit 54 southbound; US 101 north exit 430A
City and County of San Francisco		53.78	86.55	54B	US 101 north (James Lick Freeway) – San Francisco Civic Center, Bay Bridge	Northbound exit and southbound entrance; northern end of Alemany Maze; US 101 south exit 431
City and County of San Francisco		55.06	88.61	55	Cesar Chavez Street, 25th Street	25th Street not signed northbound; Cesar Chavez Street was formerly Army Street
City and County of San Francisco		56.04	90.19	56	Mariposa Street, 18th Street	18th Street not signed northbound
City and County of San Francisco		56.73	91.30	57	Sixth Street	Northbound exit and southbound entrance
City and County of San Francisco		56.98	91.70	—	Fifth Street	At-grade intersection; northern terminus
City and County of San Francisco		56.98	91.70	—	King Street	Continuation beyond Fifth Street
City and County of San Francisco				—	Fourth Street	Former northern terminus; replaced with the current King Street ramps; northbound exit only
1.000 mi = 1.609 km; 1.000 km = 0.621 mi: Closed/former; Concurrency terminus; Incomplete access; Route transition
