= Bayshore Freeway =

Freeway in California

Bayshore Freeway
- Bayshore Freeway highlighted in red

Route information
- Maintained by Caltrans
- Length: 56.4 mi (90.8 km)

Major junctions
- South end: US 101 at Blossom Hill Road (former SR 82) in San Jose
- I-280 / I-680 in San Jose; I-880 in San Jose; SR 87 in San Jose; SR 85 in Mountain View; SR 84 from Menlo Park to Redwood City; SR 92 in San Mateo; I-380 in San Bruno; I-280 in San Francisco
- North end: US 101 / I-80 in San Francisco

Location
- Country: United States
- State: California
- Counties: Santa Clara, San Mateo, San Francisco

Highway system
- United States Numbered Highway System; List; Special; Divided; State highways in California; Interstate; US; State; Scenic; History; Pre‑1964; Unconstructed; Deleted; Freeways

The Bayshore Freeway is a part of U.S. Route 101 (US 101) in the San Francisco Bay Area of the U.S. state of California. It runs along the west shore of the San Francisco Bay, connecting San Jose with San Francisco. Within the city of San Francisco, the freeway is also known as James Lick Freeway, named after the California philanthropist. The road was originally built as a surface road, the Bayshore Highway, and later upgraded to freeway standards. Before 1964, it was mostly marked as U.S. Route 101 Bypass, with US 101 using the present State Route 82 (El Camino Real).

== Route description ==
The Bayshore Freeway begins at the Blossom Hill Road interchange on US 101. The freeway curves north and northwest, bypassing downtown San Jose to the east, and then curves west-northwest, crossing I-880 and State Route 87, the latter just north of the San Jose International Airport. The portion of the highway from San Jose to South San Francisco is relatively straight and flat, running near the west edge of the San Francisco Bay. Junctions here include SR 237 in Sunnyvale, SR 85 in Mountain View, SR 84 in Menlo Park and Redwood City, SR 92 in San Mateo, and the San Francisco International Airport and I-380 in San Bruno. In South San Francisco, the freeway curves northeast around San Bruno Mountain, crossing its east edge at Sierra Point, and then heads north on a causeway across the former Candlestick Cove to the San Francisco city line.

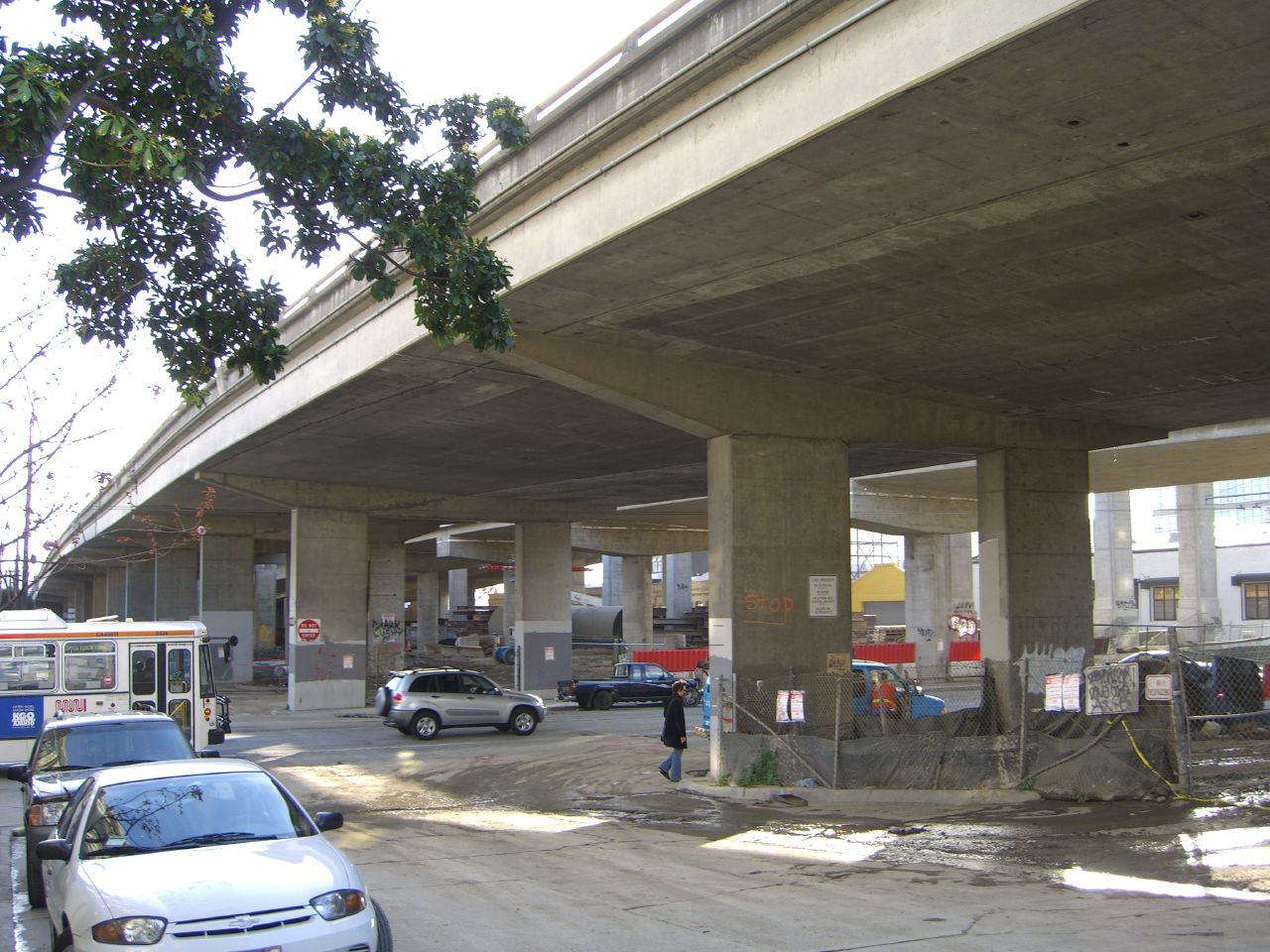
The San Francisco Skyway over Third Street

In San Francisco, where the road is also known as the James Lick Freeway, it continues north-northwesterly between Bayview Park and McLaren Park, and crosses I-280 at the Alemany Maze. There it curves north-northeasterly around Bernal Heights and then northwest around Potrero Hill, meeting the Central Freeway at the border between the Mission District and South of Market. The Bayshore Freeway ends at the intersection of US 101 and Interstate 80, which, although signed as Interstate 80, is not officially Interstate 80 until the San Francisco-Oakland Bay Bridge. The freeway that goes from US 101 to the Bay Bridge that is signed as I-80 but not officially I-80 is called the San Francisco Skyway.

== History ==
=== Initial construction ===
Before the Dumbarton and San Mateo-Hayward Bridges were built across the San Francisco Bay in the 1920s, San Francisco was bottled up at the north end of a long peninsula, with driving south on El Camino Real towards San Jose as the only reasonable alternative to the ferries for crossing the bay. The first of several highways built as an alternate to El Camino Real was the Skyline Boulevard, which was added to the state highway system in 1919. A second route, the Bay Shore Highway (Route 68), became a state highway in 1923, but only from the San Francisco city limits into San Mateo County, where the Dumbarton Bridge would begin. Just prior to the start of construction on the Dumbarton Bridge, San Francisco Supervisor Richard J. Welch noted that the Bay Shore Highway would need to be built all the way to San Jose as an escape valve for the additional traffic that the bridge would attract. Groundbreaking ceremonies were held in South San Francisco for the Bayshore Highway on September 11, 1924. The route used a right-of-way that was 125 feet (38 m) wide with a four-lane undivided highway 40 feet (12 m) wide.

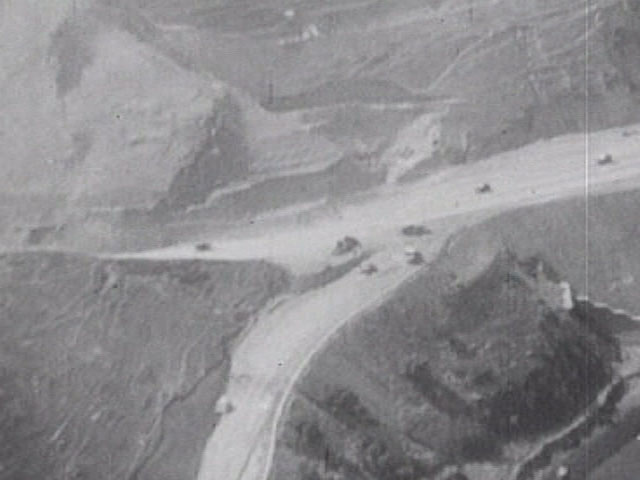
Looking west at the Sierra Point cut in Brisbane, 1929. The road crosses over Tunnel 5 of the Bayshore Cutoff rail line.

The state legislature extended the highway in 1925, defining it to run from near the intersection of Army Street (Cesar Chavez Street) and San Bruno Avenue in San Francisco to a point in San Jose. The governor approved the bill with the stipulation that only the portion between the city limits of San Francisco and San Jose would be a state highway. Construction between South San Francisco and Burlingame had begun by 1924, funded by a $500,000 contribution from San Francisco, and was completed in 1928. A disconnected segment north of San Mateo was built by the state at the same time. It was not until February 1929 that the road was fully paved between San Francisco and Burlingame, and on October 20, 1929, the new highway was officially dedicated to San Mateo, several months after the connecting San Mateo-Hayward Bridge opened (at what is now Third Avenue). Even then, motorists had to wait until May 7, 1931, to reach Jefferson Avenue in Redwood City (near the west end of the four-year-old Dumbarton Bridge). The roadway was extended to Oregon Avenue in Palo Alto in mid-1932, Lawrence Station Road in mid-1933, and to Lafayette Street near Santa Clara, across the Guadalupe River from San Jose, by 1934. The final piece to Oakland Road (13th Street) in San Jose, which was then the main road - Legislative Route 5 and Sign Route 17 - between San Jose and Oakland, was dedicated on June 12, 1937, over ten years after the Dumbarton Bridge opened in January 1927.

Although the highway was designed and built to what were, at the time, high standards, with a 100-foot (30 m) wide right-of-way in most places, it was accident-prone because it lacked a median barrier. One segment of the so-called "Bloody Bayshore" was "Boneyard Hill", a steep grade through the Visitacion Valley near the San Francisco city line, running past a bone meal plant. Causes of the crashes included turning conflicts at intersections, and speeding drivers crossing the centerline to use the oncoming lanes as a passing lane. The roadway was entirely at-grade except for crossings of rail lines. It generally followed the present alignment of the Bayshore Freeway, but deviated in several places: Old Bayshore Highway in San Jose, Veterans Boulevard in Redwood City, Bayshore Highway in Burlingame, a destroyed section of road through San Francisco International Airport, and Airport and Bayshore Boulevards from South San Francisco through Brisbane into San Francisco. Within that city, the new highway continued three miles (5 km) along the present Bay Shore Boulevard to Army (Cesar Chavez) Street and Potrero Avenue.

U.S. Route 101 Bypass
- Location: San Jose–San Francisco
- Existed: 1939–1964

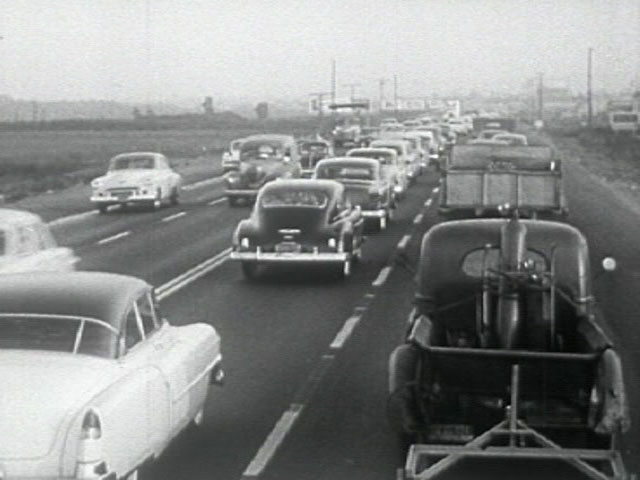
The four-lane Bayshore Highway

When the Bayshore Highway was completed in 1937, U.S. Route 101 signs were moved to it from El Camino Real, and El Camino became U.S. Route 101 Alternate. Businesses along El Camino created the El Camino Real Association to protest the move and resulting loss of business, and by 1939 the main route had been moved back, with the Bayshore Highway becoming U.S. Route 101 Bypass. The two routes split in San Jose at the junction of First and Second Streets near Keyes Street, with the El Camino route mostly following the present SR 82 and the Bayshore route using locally maintained Second, Reed, and Fourth Streets to reach the state-maintained Bayshore Highway. In San Francisco, they rejoined at the present location of the Alemany Maze, with the El Camino route following Alemany Boulevard from near the city line; from there US 101 continued north on Bay Shore Boulevard, Potrero Avenue, and 10th and Fell Streets to Van Ness Avenue, meeting the Bay Bridge approach (US 40/US 50) at Bryant and Harrison Streets. The Bryant/Harrison one-way pair was added to Route 68 (which already included the bridge) in 1937 and removed in 1947 along with the bridge; in 1961 the new freeway approach became part of Route 68, which was extended back over the bridge to Route 5 at its Oakland landfall.

Construction of an extension to Route 115 (Santa Clara Street, now SR 130) at 30th Street in San Jose began in 1939, and was completed by late 1940. As with the portion between Fourth and 13th Streets, it was not marked as a numbered route. The state legislature authorized an extension beyond San Jose back to El Camino Real near Ford Road in 1947, which was already under construction, and was completed that year. This was the first segment built with interchanges, and included a median barrier. Despite this, most crossings were at-grade; only the two ends at Route 115 (Santa Clara Street) and regular US 101 included bridges, the former a diamond interchange and the latter a simple split with additional access to Ford Road. It also crossed over Coyote Road, though with no access, just south of the Coyote Creek bridge. The original 1947 bridge over Coyote Road remains, though widened in 1990, and is one of the oldest road-road grade separations on the present freeway.

=== Reconstruction ===
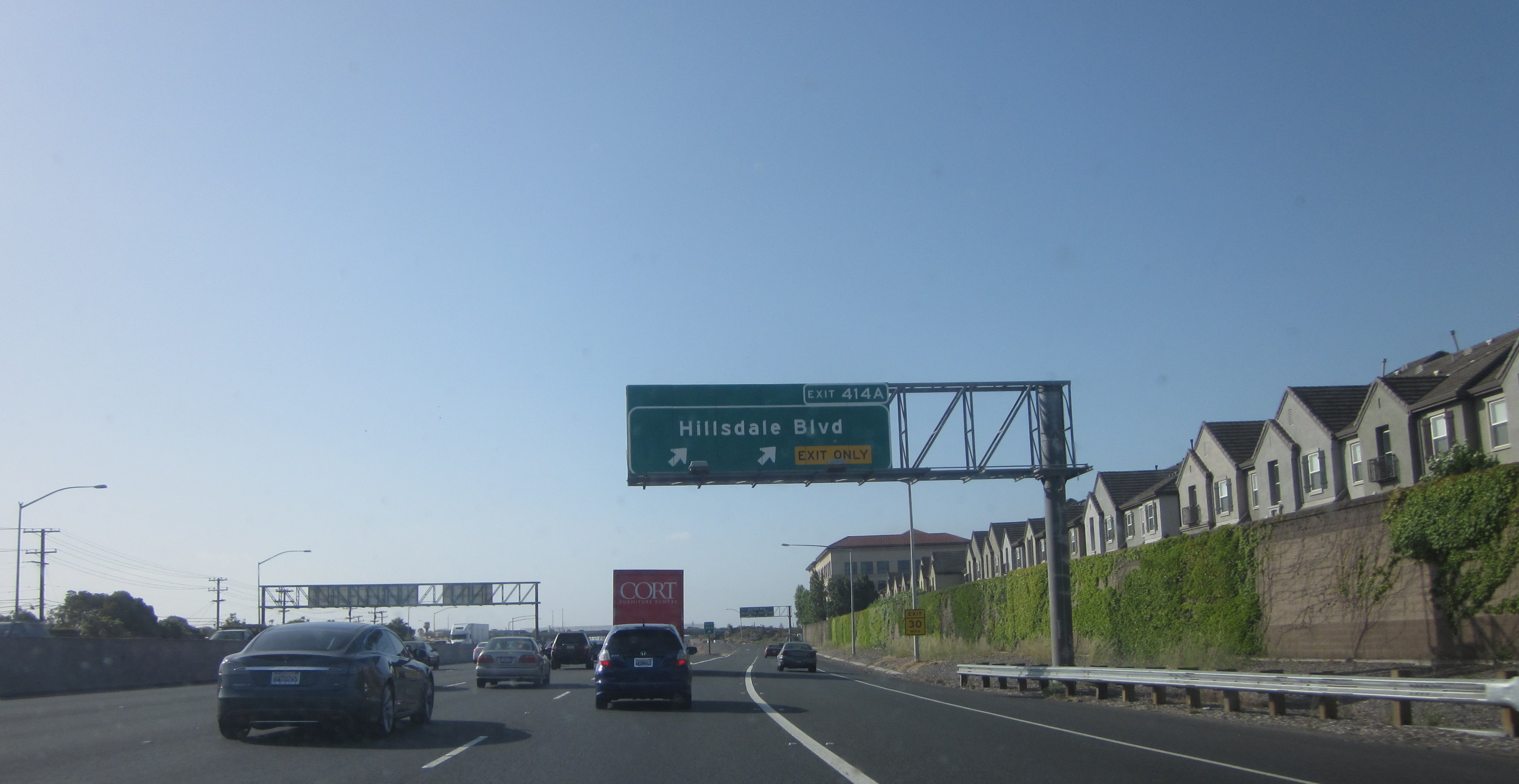
Bayshore Freeway at Hillsdale Boulevard in 2014

The Bayshore Highway through San Francisco and San Mateo counties was considered complete in 1940, at the dawn of the freeway era; that year, the California Department of Public Works announced plans to convert the Bayshore Highway into a six-lane divided freeway between San Francisco and Palo Alto. It was the first freeway planned for Northern California, and the second in the state, after the Arroyo Seco project. In general, the goals of the Bayshore Freeway project were to grade-separate the freeway from surface streets and railroad tracks to accommodate projected traffic and to reduce the rate of accidents. At the time, it was anticipated that traffic along the San Francisco Peninsula would reach the capacity of both El Camino Real and the Bayshore Highway within ten years. In addition, the accident rate along the Bayshore Highway was 2.9 per million vehicle miles, compared with the state-wide average of 1.4; current traffic on the Bayshore Highway was estimated at 30,000 vehicles per day and in 1939 alone, there were 276 accidents, resulting in 19 fatalities and 235 injuries. Twenty years later in 1959, the accident rate on the new Bayshore Freeway had dropped to 0.75 per million vehicle miles, carrying 59,000 vehicles per day.

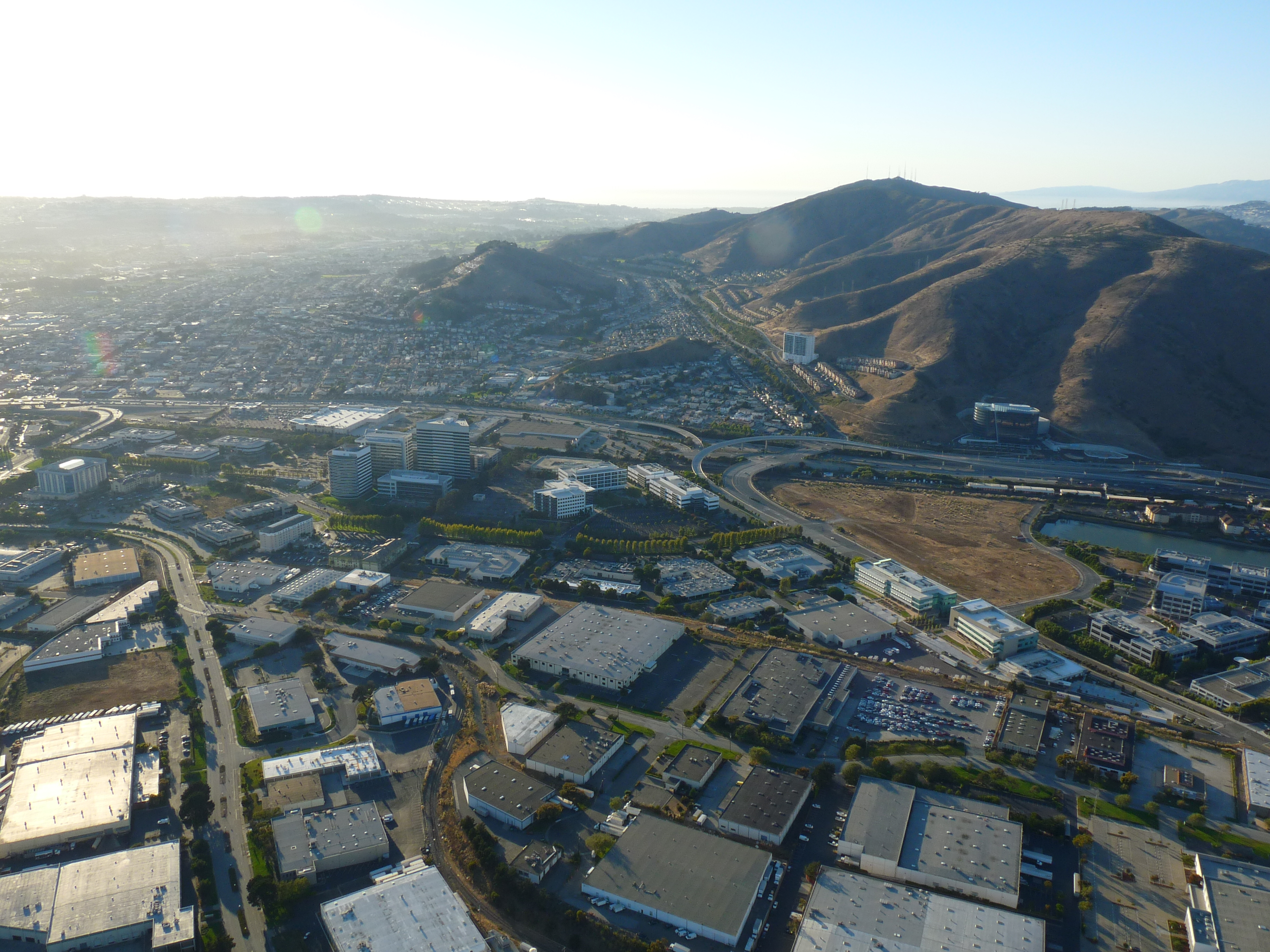
Bayshore Freeway (center of picture) in South San Francisco and Oyster Point, looking west (2010); Sign Hill and the San Bruno Mountain are in the background

The first segment rebuilt as a modern freeway was finished in 1947, stretching from Peninsula Avenue (then called Peninsular) at the San Mateo-Burlingame line to Broadway Avenue in Burlingame, including the overpass for Peninsula. Contracts in 1948 and 1949 extended the freeway north to South San Francisco, a distance of 9 miles (14 km). This segment converted the existing two-way traffic on Bayshore Highway to a single three-lane one-way road and added a new three-lane roadway running parallel to it. The new roadway, intended for northbound traffic, was constructed east of the existing alignment, separated by a 36-foot (11 m) wide median, permitting a future expansion to four lanes in each direction. This six-lane freeway followed the existing highway to Broadway in Burlingame, but then took a more inland alignment past the airport at Mills Field (now SFO), and crossed the old road at South San Francisco, running just east of it to near the south end of the cut at Sierra Point. The routing had been adjusted to the west to allow an additional 1/2 mile (0.80 km) for airport expansion. Since this segment was being constructed on predominantly marshy land, 2,000,000 cubic yards (1,500,000 m^{3}) of fill was taken from the arm of San Bruno Mountain that extended into the water as Sierra Point; the hill was essentially levelled and the remaining fill was used for airport expansion.

Construction began in San Francisco in 1950 on a 1 1/3 mi (2.1 km) segment north from Augusta to 25th at a contracted cost of $6.5 million, including the cost of the right-of-way (about half the total) and grade separations over Alemany and Army. This segment opened on June 1, 1951. Also in 1951, the state legislature renamed the portion within San Francisco after James Lick, a California pioneer and philanthropist. San Francisco construction included segments to the north, opened in 1953, and the south. The connection to the upper deck of the Bay Bridge opened in June 1955. Construction in San Francisco was completed by 1958.

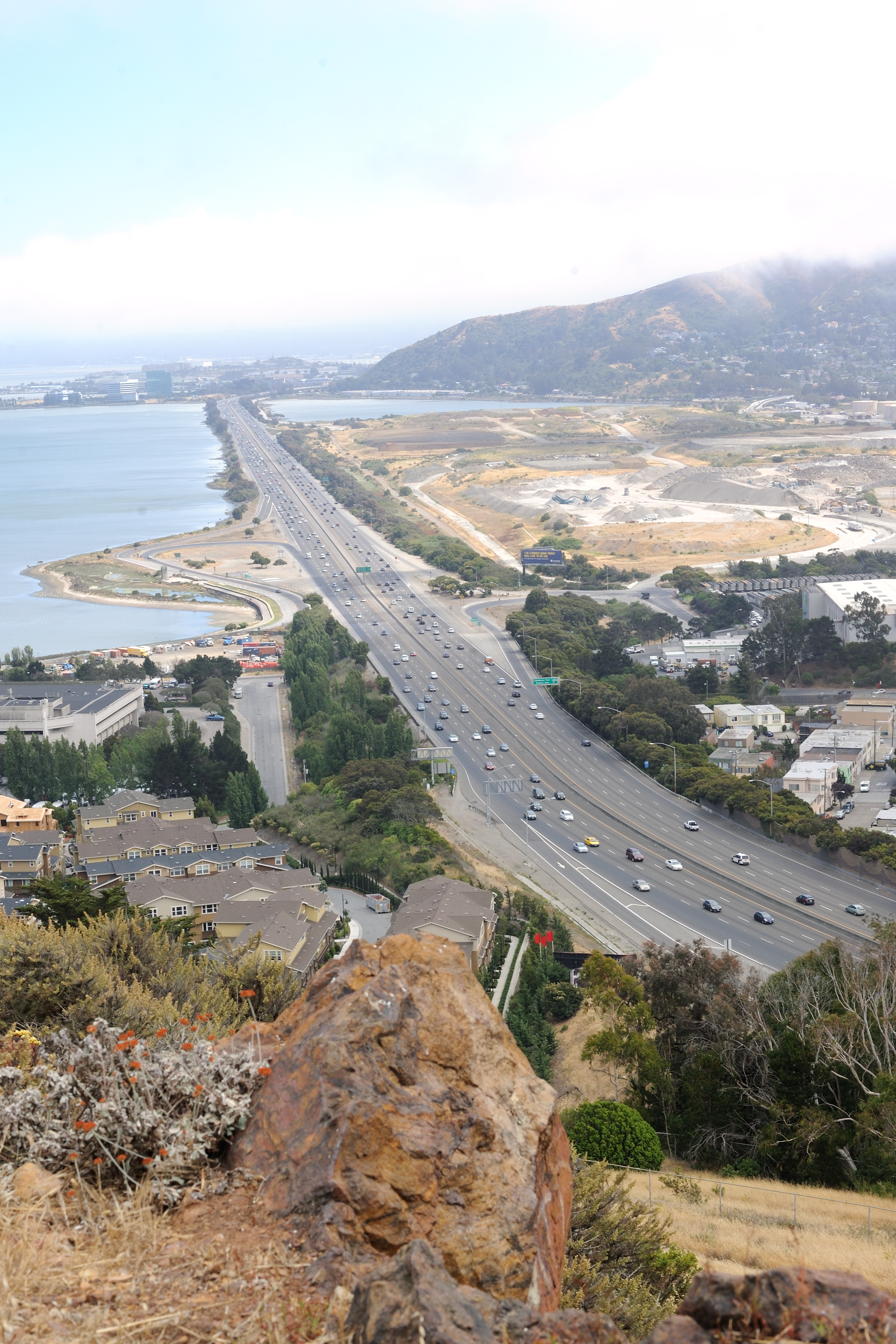
View south from Candlestick Hill in San Francisco (2013), showing US 101 over the 1957 causeway. San Bruno Mountain and Sierra Point are in the background. The area west (right) of the freeway is part of the proposed Brisbane Baylands development.

A new causeway across Candlestick Cove connected the completed section in South San Francisco with San Francisco and opened on July 11, 1957. Planning began in 1951, when bids were taken for an experimental causeway 132 feet (40 m) wide extending 0.6 miles (0.97 km) south from Candlestick Point; rather than pumping out soft bay mud and back-filling with sand, fill dirt would be dumped directly into the Bay to see if the mud underneath could be displaced instead. This section of the Bay had water up to 12 feet (3.7 m) deep, overlying soft mud 40 to 80 feet (12 to 24 m) deep, which in turn was overlying harder, compacted mud. The compacted mud was deemed sufficiently strong to support the weight of the freeway, but it was hoped that excavation of the soft mud layer could be avoided by dumping fill at a sufficient rate, later calculated to be 5,000 cubic yards (3,800 m^{3}) per day. The experiment was deemed a success, and the remaining 0.9 miles (1.4 km) of causeway was put out for bid in 1954, awarded in 1955 to Guy F. Atkinson Co. By that time, over 4,000,000 cubic yards (3,100,000 m^{3}) of fill had already been placed.

Meanwhile, construction had progressed south from San Mateo through San Carlos, with that segment completed in 1954, and continuing on into Redwood City (Marsh Road relocation, July 1958), Menlo Park (Willow Road Interchange, 1956), and Palo Alto (June 1958).

A movement to make the four-lane undivided "Bloody Bayshore" safer all the way to San Jose began in Palo Alto. As a temporary measure, the state lowered the speed limit, installed traffic signals, closed minor crossroads, and prohibited left turns in places. The community convinced the state to extend the six-lane freeway. Contracts for the projects in Santa Clara County had been awarded by 1959, and the Bayshore Freeway was completed to San Jose in 1962, officially opening on February 2 of that year. The total cost of freeway conversion was US$114,619,100 (equivalent to $1,191,460,000 in 2024), including US$42,500,000 (equivalent to $441,780,000 in 2024) to acquire right-of-way. The south end of the freeway was the old El Camino Real merge near Ford Road until 1984, when the South Valley Freeway was built from there to Cochrane Road in Morgan Hill connecting the Bayshore Freeway to the existing segment of the South Valley Freeway south of Cochrane Road in Morgan Hill to Monterey Road in Gilroy which had been built in 1973.

== Exit list ==
Except where prefixed with a letter, postmiles were measured on the road as it was in 1964, based on the alignment that existed at the time, and do not necessarily reflect current mileage. R reflects a realignment in the route since then, M indicates a second realignment, L refers to an overlap due to a correction or change, and T indicates postmiles classified as temporary. Segments that remain unconstructed or have been relinquished to local control may be omitted. The numbers reset at county lines; the start and end postmiles in each county are given in the county column.

County	Location	Postmile	Exit	Destinations	Notes
Santa Clara	San Jose	R28.61		US 101 south (South Valley Freeway) – Los Angeles	Continuation beyond CR G10 (Blossom Hill Road)
Santa Clara	San Jose	R28.61	378	Blossom Hill Road (CR G10) / Silver Creek Valley Road	South end of Bayshore Freeway; former SR 82
See US 101 Exits 380–433A
City and County of San Francisco		R4.24	433B	I-80 east – Bay Bridge, Oakland	Signed as exit 433 southbound; north end of Bayshore Freeway; I-80 exit 1A
City and County of San Francisco		R4.24		US 101 north (Central Freeway) – Golden Gate Bridge, San Francisco Civic Center	Continuation beyond I-80
1.000 mi = 1.609 km; 1.000 km = 0.621 mi
