= List of highways numbered 377 =

The following highways are numbered 377:

== Brazil ==
- BR-377

== Canada ==
- Saskatchewan Highway 377

== Japan ==
- Japan National Route 377

== United States ==
- U.S. Route 377
- Arizona State Route 377
- Arkansas Highway 377
- Georgia State Route 377
- Hawaii Route 377
- Maryland Route 377 (unsigned)
- Nevada State Route 377
- New York State Route 377
- Ohio State Route 377
- Puerto Rico Highway 377
- South Dakota Highway 377
- Tennessee State Route 377
- Texas:
  - Texas State Highway Loop 377 (former)
  - Farm to Market Road 377
- Virginia State Route 377
- Wyoming Highway 377

Preceded by 376	Lists of highways 377	Succeeded by 378
