= List of highways numbered 376 =

The following highways are numbered 376:

== Canada ==
- Nova Scotia Route 376
- Saskatchewan Highway 376

== Cuba ==
- San Jose–La Ceiba Road (2–376)

== Japan ==
- Japan National Route 376

== United States ==
- Interstate 376
- Interstate 376 Business Loop
- Florida State Road 376 (former)
- Georgia State Route 376
- Iowa Highway 376 (unsigned designation for US 75 Bus.)
- Maryland Route 376
- Missouri Route 376
- Montana Secondary Highway 376 (former)
- Nevada State Route 376
- New York State Route 376
- Ohio State Route 376
- Puerto Rico Highway 376
- Virginia State Route 376
- Wyoming Highway 376

Preceded by 375	Lists of highways 376	Succeeded by 377
