= List of highways numbered 378 =

The following highways are numbered 378:

== Canada ==
- Saskatchewan Highway 378

== Japan ==
- Japan National Route 378

== United States ==
- Interstate 378 (former)
- U.S. Route 378
- Georgia State Route 378
- Louisiana Highway 378
- Maryland Route 378 (unsigned)
- Nevada State Route 378 (former)
- New Mexico State Road 378
- New York State Route 378
- Ohio State Route 378
- Pennsylvania Route 378
- Puerto Rico Highway 378
- Virginia State Route 378

Preceded by 377	Lists of highways 378	Succeeded by 379
