= List of highways numbered 381 =

The following highways are numbered 381:

== Brazil ==
- BR-381

== Canada ==
- Newfoundland and Labrador Route 381
- Quebec Route 381
- Saskatchewan Highway 381

== Cuba ==
- Road of Jamaica (Cuba) (2–381)

== Japan ==
- Japan National Route 381

== United States ==
- Interstate 381
- Georgia State Route 381 (former)
- Kentucky Route 381
- Maryland Route 381
- New York State Route 381 (former)
- North Carolina Highway 381
- Pennsylvania Route 381
- Puerto Rico Highway 381
- South Carolina Highway 381
- Tennessee State Route 381
- Virginia State Route 381

Preceded by 380	Lists of highways 381	Succeeded by 382
