= List of highways numbered 379 =

The following highways are numbered 379:

== Canada ==
- Saskatchewan Highway 379

== Japan ==
- Japan National Route 379

== United Kingdom ==
- A379 road

== United States ==
- County Road 379 (Franklin County, Florida)
  - County Road 379A (Franklin County, Florida)
- County Road 379 (Gadsden County, Florida)
  - County Road 379A (Gadsden County, Florida)
  - County Road 379B (Gadsden County, Florida)
- Georgia State Route 379 (former)
- Montana Secondary Highway 379
- Nevada State Route 379
- New York State Route 379 (former)
- Ohio State Route 379
- Puerto Rico Highway 379
- Tennessee State Route 379
- Texas State Highway Spur 379
- Virginia State Route 379

Preceded by 378	Lists of highways 379	Succeeded by 380
