= List of highways numbered 382 =

The following highways are numbered 382:

== Canada ==
- Newfoundland and Labrador Route 382
- Quebec Route 382

== Japan ==
- Japan National Route 382

== United States ==
- Arkansas Highway 382
  - Arkansas Highway 382 Spur
- Georgia State Route 382
- Louisiana Highway 382
- Maryland Route 382
- New York State Route 382 (former)
- Ohio State Route 382 (former)
- Pennsylvania Route 382
- Puerto Rico Highway 382
- South Carolina Highway 382 (former)
- Tennessee State Route 382
- Virginia State Route 382

Preceded by 381	Lists of highways 382	Succeeded by 383
