= Joe Colla Interchange =

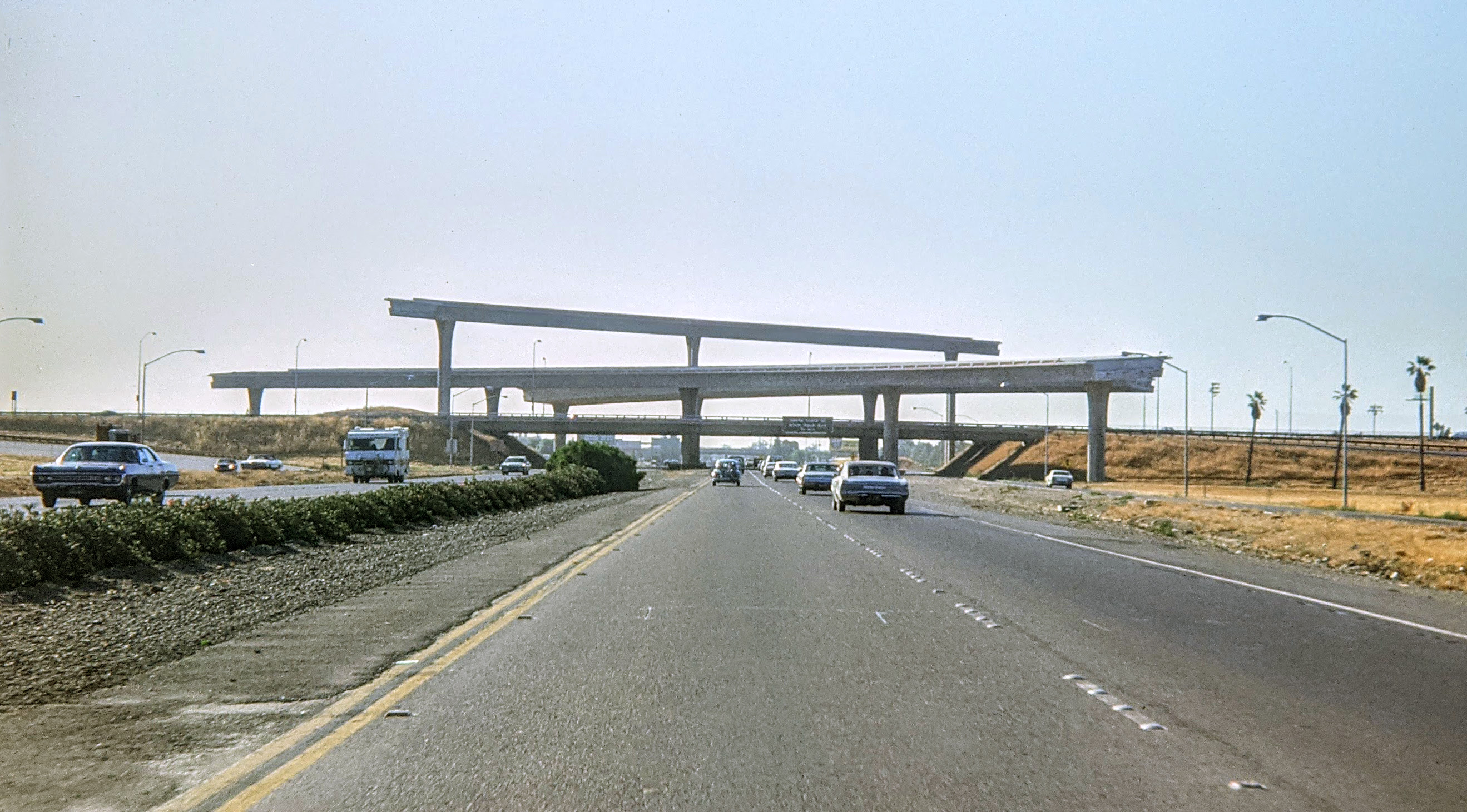
- The Joe Colla Interchange in 1975, with its then-unfinished flyover ramps
- Interactive map of Joe Colla Interchange

Location
- San Jose, California
- Coordinates: 37.33965°N 121.851683°W
- Roads at junction: I-680; I-280; US 101; Story Road

Construction
- Type: Four-level Interchange
- Constructed: 1976–81
- Opened: 1981
- Maintained by: Caltrans

The Joe Colla Interchange is a highway interchange in San Jose, California, United States, connecting Interstate 280 (I-280), I-680, and U.S. Route 101 (US 101). It is named after Joe Colla, a former councilmember of San Jose, who also participated in a stunt in 1976 to protest the interchange's delayed construction.

== Description ==
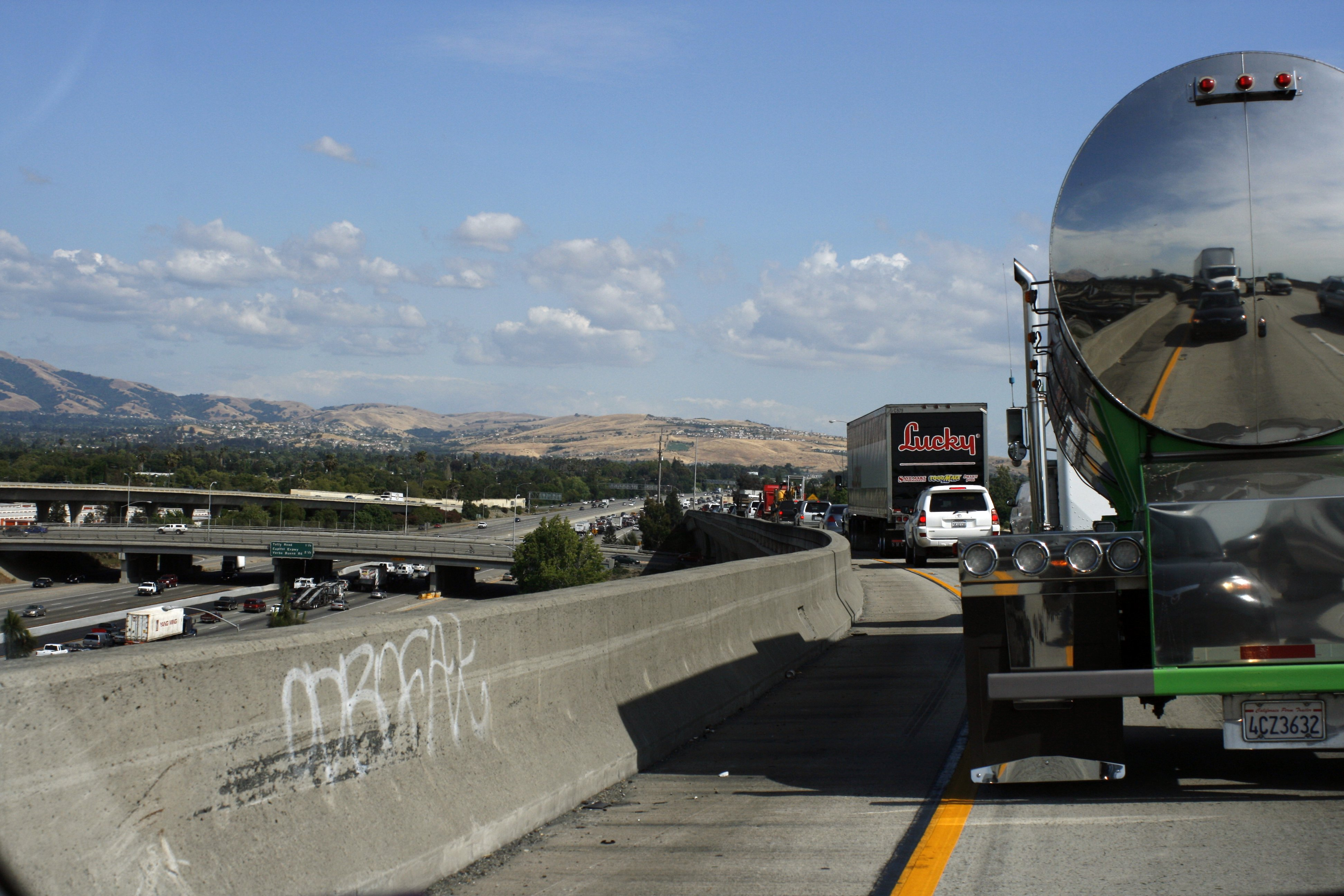
View from a high ramp of the Joe Colla Interchange

The highway is a four level stack interchange. US-101 serves the first level of the complex. The second level marks the southern termini of both I-280 and I-680, as their primary lanes head into each other; I-280 then runs from the interchange southwesterly to Downtown San Jose, while I-680 runs northeasterly. The third level contains ramps connecting northbound US-101 to northbound I-280 and southbound US 101 to northbound I-680, and the fourth level is a ramp connecting southbound I-680 to southbound US-101. This ramp is a site of major traffic, as there are only two lanes of the ramp from southbound I-680 to southbound US-101. The fourth-level ramp connects the third level ramp as they enter US-101, while the third-level ramp heading to northbound I-680 connects a ramp from northbound US-101 to northbound I-680. A one-lane ramp connects southbound US-101 to northbound I-280 and a cloverleaf ramp connects southbound I-280 to northbound US-101. The ramps to and from US-101 south then extend over the cloverleaf interchange with Story Road.

The interchange is a major traffic hub for the San Francisco Bay Area. From the interchange, I-280 then runs just to the west of the larger cities of San Francisco Peninsula for most of its route to San Francisco. I-680 curves around the eastern cities of the Bay Area to join I-80 in Fairfield, providing a connection to Sacramento. US 101 heads north along the eastern side of the San Francisco Peninsula to San Francisco, and south to the California Central Coast and Los Angeles.

== History ==
The construction of the Joe Colla Interchange was delayed for almost five years. By January 1976, the state's budget woes resulted in construction being abandoned, leaving three uncompleted flyover ramps hanging over US-101 and unfinished I-280/I-680. At this time, both I-280 and I-680 were completed to their current southern terminus. I-280 ended at State Route 17 (SR-17), now I-880, and I-680 ended in Milpitas, California.

=== Joe Colla stunt ===
Near midnight, protesters of the unfinished interchange – San Jose councilmember Joe Colla, union representative Tom Carter, and construction executive Doug Beatty – lifted a 1960 Chevrolet Impala with a crane and placed it on top of an unfinished ramp. They were not seen by police, although one officer recalled seeing a crane on the unfinished ramp, but assumed that it was late night work.

Later that morning, Joe Colla rode a helicopter to the top of the same unfinished ramp and took a picture with the Impala. The next day, that picture ran in dozens of newspapers and according to the San Jose Mercury News, pressured then-governor of California Jerry Brown. In part because of the publicity of the stunt, the interchange eventually received the necessary funding to be completed.

In 2010, this interchange was named the Joe Colla Interchange. Signs naming the interchange were posted in January 2016.
