= Alemany Boulevard =

Street in San Francisco, California

- Interactive map of Alemany Boulevard
- Length: 4.4 mi (7.1 km)
- Location: San Francisco, California
- Southwest end: SR 1 / Junipero Serra Blvd in San Francisco
- Northeast end: Bayshore Blvd in San Francisco

Alemany Boulevard is a northeast–southwest street in San Francisco, California, United States.

== Description ==
It starts at Bayshore Boulevard near the Alemany Maze (the intersection of Interstate 280 and U.S. 101). The eastbound and westbound lanes split beneath the interchange, allowing for access ramps to US-101 from the middle. This configuration is referred to as the Alemany Circle. To the west, the road again splits into two carriageways, with I-280 running in the middle. At Congdon Street, the two carriageways merge. After passing under Mission Street, Alemany continues south and traverses the Excelsior District, running south of I-280. Between Brotherhood Boulevard and San Jose Avenue, Alemany runs one-way eastbound, with westbound traffic crossing under I-280 and through Sagamore Street, meeting up with Alemany again. It continues west and ends at Junipero Serra Boulevard (State Route 1), which provides access to John Daly Boulevard and I-280.

According to SFGate, "Alemany" is pronounced "al-UH-mainy" locally.

== History ==
The boulevard was named for Archbishop Joseph Sadoc Alemany. Alemany, who in 1840 completed his studies in sacred theology in Rome at the College of St. Thomas, the future Pontifical University of Saint Thomas Aquinas, Angelicum, was consecrated Bishop of Monterey in California at Rome on June 30, 1850. He was transferred on July 29, 1853, to the See of San Francisco as its first archbishop.

The Alemany corridor was originally part of the Ocean Shore Railroad, a short-lived railroad that ran from San Francisco south to Tunitas.
