= Interstate 380 (California) =

Interstate highway in California

Interstate 380
- Quentin L. Kopp Freeway
- I-380 highlighted in red

Route information
- Maintained by Caltrans
- Length: 3.3 mi (5.3 km)
- Existed: 1964–present
- NHS: Entire route

Major junctions
- West end: I-280 in San Bruno
- SR 82 in San Bruno
- East end: US 101 in South San Francisco

Location
- Country: United States
- State: California
- Counties: San Mateo

Highway system
- Interstate Highway System; Main; Auxiliary; Suffixed; Business; Future; State highways in California; Interstate; US; State; Scenic; History; Pre‑1964; Unconstructed; Deleted; Freeways
← SR 371	→ US 395

Interstate 380 (I-380) is a short 3.3-mile (5.3 km) east–west auxiliary Interstate Highway in the San Francisco Bay Area of Northern California, connecting I-280 in San Bruno to US Route 101 (US 101) near San Francisco International Airport. The highway primarily consists of only three intersections: I-280, State Route 82 (SR 82/El Camino Real), and US 101. Like the nearby I-280, I-380 never connects to I-80, its parent Interstate Highway. However, there is no rule that says that spur routes need to do so.

I-380 is officially known as the Quentin L. Kopp Freeway, named after the prominent California state senator from San Mateo County. This highway was previously named the Portola Freeway to honor the 18th-century Spanish explorer Gaspar de Portolá, whose expedition in 1769–1770 discovered the San Francisco Bay, from a viewpoint on the Sweeney Ridge located between San Bruno and Pacifica.

== Route description ==
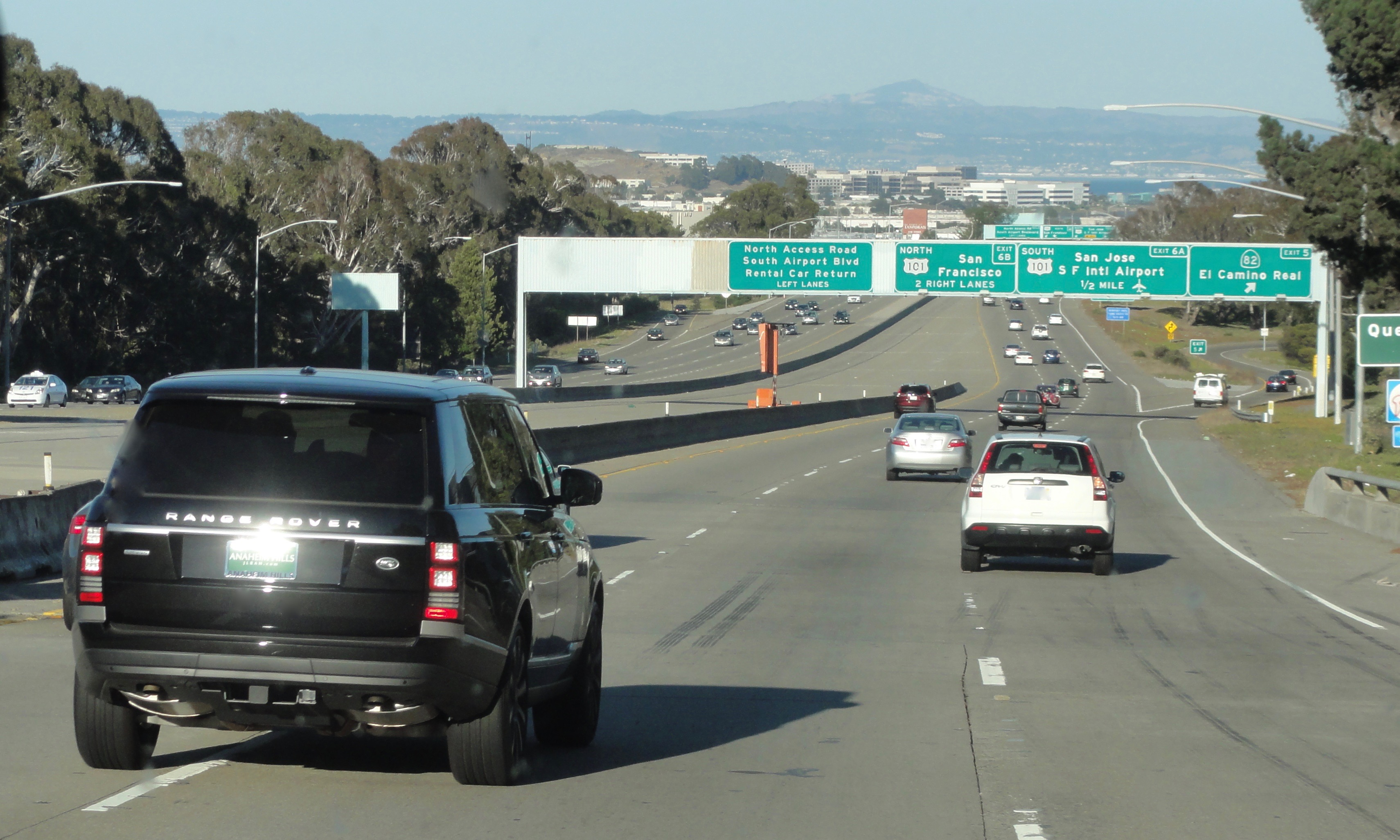
Along eastbound on I-380 near the SR 82 exit. Note the very broad freeway median.

The entirety of I-380 is defined in section 608 of the California Streets and Highways Code as Route 380, and that the highway is from:

(a) Route 1 near Pacifica to Route 280 in San Bruno.
(b) Route 280 in San Bruno to Route 101 in the vicinity of the San Francisco International Airport.

The segment defined in subdivision (a) remains unconstructed, and is not included in the Federal Highway Administration (FHWA)'s Interstate Highway route logs.

I-380 begins at a junction with I-280 in San Bruno. This junction was only partially built, with room to accommodate a proposed freeway extension west toward SR 1. The freeway itself lacks overhead guide signs mentioning I-380. It then travels east through the city of San Bruno, intersecting with SR 82 (El Camino Real) before reaching US 101.

At its terminus at US 101, the mainline lanes of I-380 continue to North Access Road. The ramps to and from southbound US 101 provide connections to collector–distributor roads leading directly to San Francisco International Airport, allowing traffic between the Interstate and the airport to avoid merging with the main traffic lanes of US 101.

I-380 is part of the California Freeway and Expressway System and is part of the National Highway System, a network of highways that are considered essential to the country's economy, defense, and mobility by the Federal Highway Administration (FHWA).

== History ==
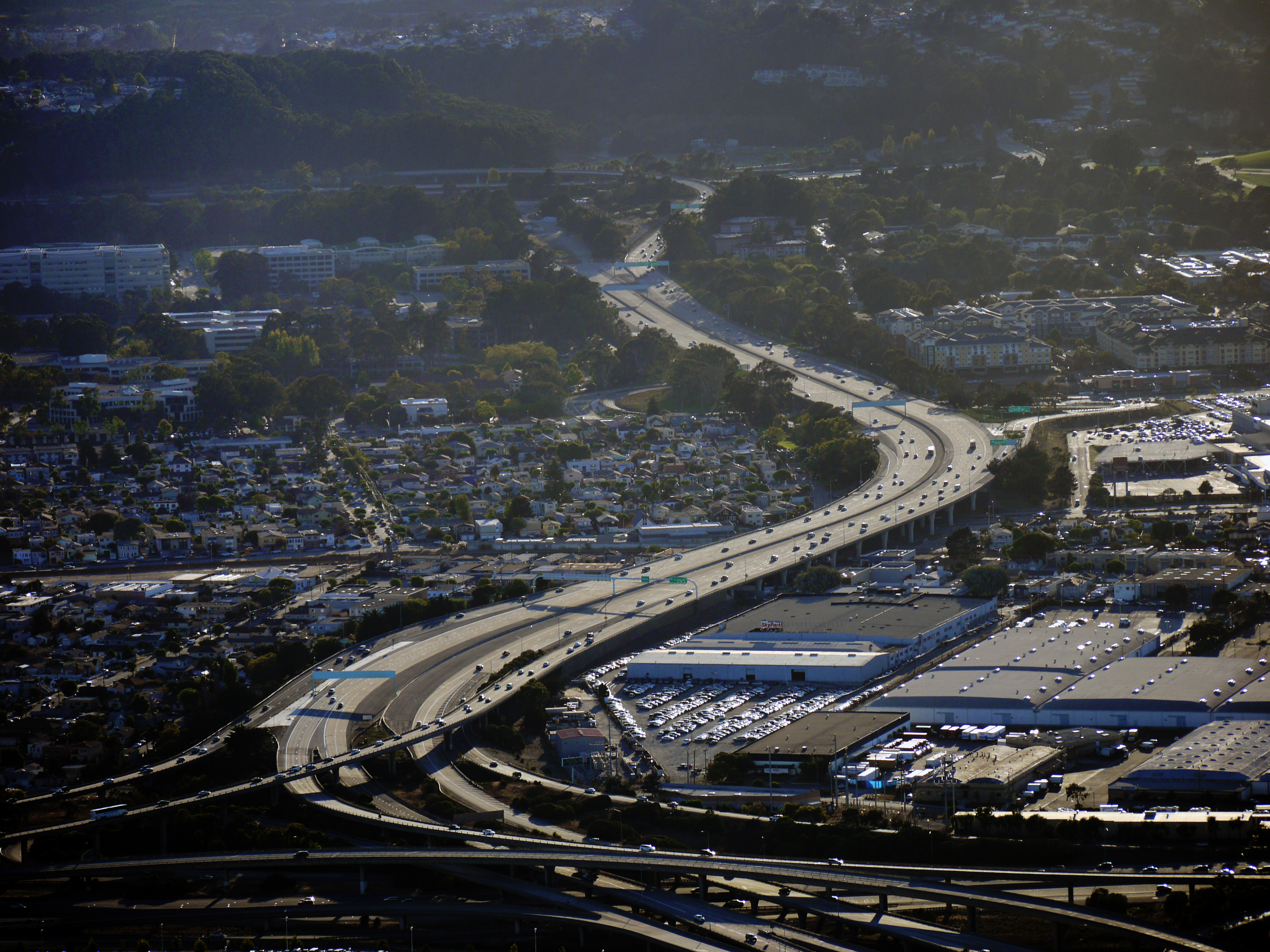
Aerial view of I-380, facing west. US 101 (Bayshore Freeway) runs north/south along the bottom of the photograph, while I-280 runs parallel in the background, with I-380 connecting the two.

There were plans to extend I-380 west to SR 1 (Cabrillo Highway), but, due to the route's passing over the San Andreas Fault and opposition from members of the local community, this project was abandoned. The westbound lanes of I-380 branch off to the right at I-280, leaving a wide, paved space which would carry the freeway extension under I-280 toward SR 1. This space is currently often used as storage space for equipment used in highway maintenance. A pair of unused bridges crossing over the I-280 south to I-380 east offramp remain as evidence. Furthermore, exit numbers assigned at I-380 start at 5 instead of 1 or 0, assuming there would still be an extension to SR 1.

== Exit list ==
Under the official exit list by Caltrans, mileage is measured from the unconstructed western terminus at SR 1 near Pacifica. The entire route is in San Mateo County.

Location	mi	km	Exit	Destinations	Notes
San Bruno	5.47	8.80	5A	I-280 north (Junipero Serra Freeway) – San Francisco	West end of I-380; I-280 north exit 43B; south exit 43A; stack interchange with westbound part being stub road
San Bruno	5.47	8.80	5B	I-280 south (Junipero Serra Freeway) – San Jose	West end of I-380; I-280 north exit 43B; south exit 43A; stack interchange with westbound part being stub road
San Bruno	5.47	8.80	5C	SR 82 (El Camino Real)	Signed as exit 5 eastbound
San Bruno	6.23	10.03	6A	US 101 south (Bayshore Freeway) – San Francisco International Airport, San Jose	Signed as exit 6 westbound; US 101 exits 423B-C (exit 423C signed as North Access Road)
San Bruno	6.37	10.25	6B	US 101 north (Bayshore Freeway) – San Francisco	Signed as exit 6 westbound; US 101 exits 423B-C (exit 423C signed as North Access Road)
South San Francisco	6.60	10.62	7	South Airport Boulevard, North Access Road – Rental Car Return, Long Term Parking, North Cargo Area	East end of I-380
1.000 mi = 1.609 km; 1.000 km = 0.621 mi: Incomplete access
