= Chinatown Handy Guide =

- Author: John T.C. Fang
- Language: English
- Series: Chinatown Handy Guide Series
- Subject: Chinatown Tourism
- Genre: Guide book
- Publisher: Chinese Publishing House
- Publication date: 1959
- Publication place: United States
- Media type: Softcover
- Pages: 128
- LC Class: 59065129

The Chinatown Handy Guide was one of the early Chinatown tour books published by a Chinese American author and recorded in the World Catalog. It was published in four different geographic editions tailored to the largest established Chinatowns in America's biggest cities: Chinatown Handy Guide New York, Chinatown Handy Guide Chicago, Chinatown Handy Guide San Francisco and Chinatown Handy Guide Los Angeles (in order of publication). In addition, there were four sister books that promoted tourism for the Chinatown's in Cleveland, Sacramento, Seattle, and Stockton

Pioneering newspaperman John T.C. Fang published all the Chinatown Handy Guides through his company Chinese Publishing House, and he served as Editor and Publisher for each of the books. Fang went on to start AsianWeek, the first and largest English language newsweekly for the Asian American community, and the Fang Family became the first Asian Americans to own major American newspapers including the Independent Newspaper Group and The San Francisco Examiner.

“Capitalizing on the fact that Chinatowns were becoming tourist attractions” across America, Fang's Chinatown Handy Guides took a unique approach of not only promoting Chinatowns as a tourist destination, but also as a place of interaction between Chinese Americans and white Americans. The San Francisco edition featured an “international group of businessmen and pastors” gathering for “bible class conducted each week in a local pharmacy.” The New York City edition included photos of Chinese children as part of a fundraising drive for the Red Cross, and another photo of “visiting Congressmen” being welcomed in Chinatown.

Later academics described the books as “intended to boost (Chinatown’s) flagging tourist economy”, and as luring “sightseers with a predictable dim sum glossary, the origin story of chop suey, and a tutorial on how to hold chopsticks.”

But the Chinatown Handy Guides also sought to characterize the development of the nation's Chinatowns as important contributors to America's economy. Each edition included a history of the specific Chinatown in that city, and quantified the economic contributions of the Chinese community, claiming for example, that in 1958 it was “safe to estimate that in Greater New York there (were) over 2,000 restaurants representing a total investment of over $100 million dollars, 500 stores, markets and curio shops and 5,000 laundries owned by Chinese.” Each guidebook also included “Points of Interest” and advertisements from local Chinatown establishments.

The tourist booklets featured photos of many prominent Americans in Chinatown from President Richard Nixon to U.S. Congressmen and Senators. Republican Mayor George Christopher of San Francisco offered a welcome letter for the SF edition, while New York's Democratic Mayor Robert F. Wagner Jr. demonstrated how to use chopsticks in the NYC edition. Hollywood stars pictured visiting Chinatown ranged from Lucille Ball to Danny Kaye. The only African American pictured in Chinatown was Nat King Cole in San Francisco.

== History and distribution ==
John T.C. Fang immigrated to the United States in 1952 and studied journalism at the University of California, Berkeley campus. Afterwards, he traveled to New York City where he published the first Chinatown Handy Guide in 1958. At the end of that year, Fang went to Chicago's Chinatown where the cold winter nearly prevented him from completing that city's edition. In 1959, Fang returned to the West Coast and published the San Francisco and Los Angeles editions of the Chinatown Handy Guide. After launching all four books, Fang returned to Taiwan as a successful publisher and entrepreneur, and married his wife Florence Fang, before the couple returned to America and John began working in the newspaper industry.

Fang used a number of business, publishing and marketing techniques to promote Chinatown tourism. This included creating dual revenue streams – one from advertisements placed in the booklets by Chinatown restaurants and merchants, and another revenue stream from single copy sales as the booklets were sold for $1 each (including postage and handling for mail-in orders!)

Fang also produced innovative marketing materials to promote the books. A 1960 brochure promoting the Chinese New Year Festival exhorted tourists to get “more enjoyment from your Chinatown visit” by purchasing a Chinatown Handy Guide, “available at Macy’s, White House (department store), Emporium, City of Paris, Woolworth’s and all leading department and book stores and Chinatown gift shops.”

== Orientalism and cultural impact ==
The Chinatown Handy Guides were published at the height of the American Civil Rights Movement. With their focus on Chinese Americans however, the booklets promoted integration of Chinese in America rather than fighting against segregation practices that African Americans faced in southern states. Fang was a Chinese American who published his work during a time when "San Francisco entrepreneurs recognized the retail potential of the model family concept” to serve as “both a political defense mechanism and a means to strengthen (the Chinese community’s) economic muscle.”

Facing eighty years of anti-Chinese policy since passage of the Chinese Exclusion Act in 1882, many Chinese leaders in the 1960s (including Fang) hoped to soften American attitudes by portraying the Chinese community as industrious, family-oriented and non-violent. As later researchers noted, “Chinese Americans came to rely on the trope of nondelinquency to advance their social-political ambitions—a tactic that enabled a reconciliation of claims to full citizenship with the replication of racial distinction.”

The Chinatown Handy Guide prominently included features like “Chinatown’s Pride: No Juvenile Delinquency Problem,” “San Francisco Hail Chinese as Law-Abiding,” and “Mutual Love of Children and Elders Is the Basis of Chinese Family Life.” All editions of the book proudly proclaimed: “Chinatown is not concerned with finding a cure for juvenile delinquency. It has a preventive in its exemplary family life.”

The 1960s also marked the beginning of the end for “the usage of ‘Oriental’ or ‘Orient’ as a catch-all phrase for Chinese and Japanese” people. Popularized at the beginning of the 20th Century in the 1900s, the term ‘Oriental’ had replaced the earlier use of ‘Mongol’ or ‘Mongoloid’ as descriptors for people of Asian descent. ‘Oriental’ was still the most accepted term for Asians in 1960 as the Chinatown Handy Guide proudly called Chinatown the “Oriental Colony” on its front cover, and repeatedly used the term ‘Oriental’ throughout its text.

Later as founder of AsianWeek newspaper, Fang would play an important role in replacing the term ‘Oriental’ with ‘Asian’ as the accepted terminology for describing the pan-ethnic Asian Pacific Islander population which grew dramatically in the United States after passage of the 1965 Immigration Act. Even in his later years, Fang continued to be considered an expert on Chinatown and the Chinese community, commenting to The Christian Science Monitor in 1998 on how Chinese born in America were moving out of Chinatown into the suburbs.

The Chinatown Handy Guide is catalogued at the Library of Congress and continues to be used as a historical resource both for its text and its photographs. The books have also become memorabilia, an original copy recently sold for $425 as a part of a batch of scarce Chinatown ephemera.

== Other publications ==
John T.C. Fang's company, the Chinese Publishing House was an active publisher of books and directories focused on Chinatown and the Chinese community in America. Aside from the four editions of the Chinatown Handy Guide, these other books have also been documented:
Dining a la Chinese: A Guide to the Chinese community and Restaurants in Cleveland
Yee Fow: the Chinese community in Sacramento (1961)
Oriental flavors : a guide to Seattle's Chinatown (1962)
The Chinese community in Stockton: Wah Yun Shih-tso tun hua jen (1963)
Los Angeles Chinese Directory: Luosheng Hua ren shang ye shou ce (1965)
Sacramento's Chinese Directory (1960s)
