= AsianWeek =

US newspaper

Coordinates: 37.793294°N 122.406336°W

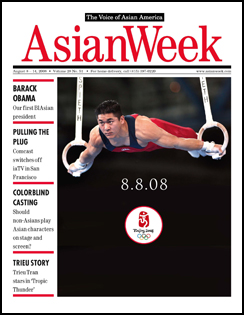
- An AsianWeek cover from August 2008
- Type: National weekly newspaper
- Format: Tabloid
- Owner: Pan Asia Venture Capital Corporation
- President: James Fang
- Editor: Ted Fang
- Founded: 1979
- Ceased publication: January 2, 2009 (print)
- Language: English
- Headquarters: 809 Sacramento Street, San Francisco, California; United States
- Circulation: 58,099
- Price: Free
- ISSN: 0195-2056

AsianWeek was America's first and largest English-language print and on-line publication serving East Asian Americans. The news organization played an important role nationally and in the San Francisco Bay Area as the “Voice of Asian America”. It provided news coverage across all East Asian ethnicities.

AsianWeek's nature was reflected in its name -- both its weekly frequency and its focus on a pan-ethnic East Asian identity, as the only all English publication serving the Asian community. AsianWeek was one of the newspapers owned and operated by the Fang family of San Francisco, with others including the San Francisco Independent and the San Francisco Examiner. It was founded by John Fang in 1979 and helmed by long-time AsianWeek President James Fang from 1993-2009.

AsianWeek headquarters were located in San Francisco's Chinatown. It stopped publishing a weekly print edition in 2009, and on-line publication ceased in 2012. In 2023, an archive of past issues went online.

== History ==
James Fang, AsianWeek President 1993-2009

AsianWeek was the largest and longest established English-language newsweekly for Asian Pacific Americans. In 1965, after the Hart-Celler Immigration Act ended over 80 years of race-based exclusion of immigrants from Asia, the United States for the first time experienced an influx of Asian immigration. Realizing the need to provide a voice for this newly emerging Asian Pacific America, John Fang founded the AsianWeek newspaper in 1979 in San Francisco. Prior to AsianWeek, Fang was editor and publisher of the Young China Daily, a Chinese-language newspaper affiliated with Taiwan’s then-Nationalist government. Fang had also published the Chinatown Handy Guide in multiple U.S. cities. Over two years of planning before AsianWeek's pilot issue was published in August 1979, Fang’s brain trust included Chinatown publicist H. K. Wong, writer Charles Leong, former aide to Congressman Phil Burton (and the first Chinese Postmaster of a U.S. city) Lim P. Lee, and society columnist Carolyn Gan.

The newspaper started as all-subscription based and has always been published in tabloid-size format. In 1995 AsianWeek was redesigned as a newspaper magazine-style tabloid with full-color cover and color graphics throughout. The paper also went to free distribution and launched its website, www.asianweek.com, the following year. AsianWeek reached its high mark in circulation of 58,000 copies in 2003.

In a commemorative November 2004 essay celebrating AsianWeek's 25th Anniversary of publication, its president James Fang highlighted its coverage of the killing of Vincent Chin and its role "in demanding justice for Wen Ho Lee and Capt. James Yee.”

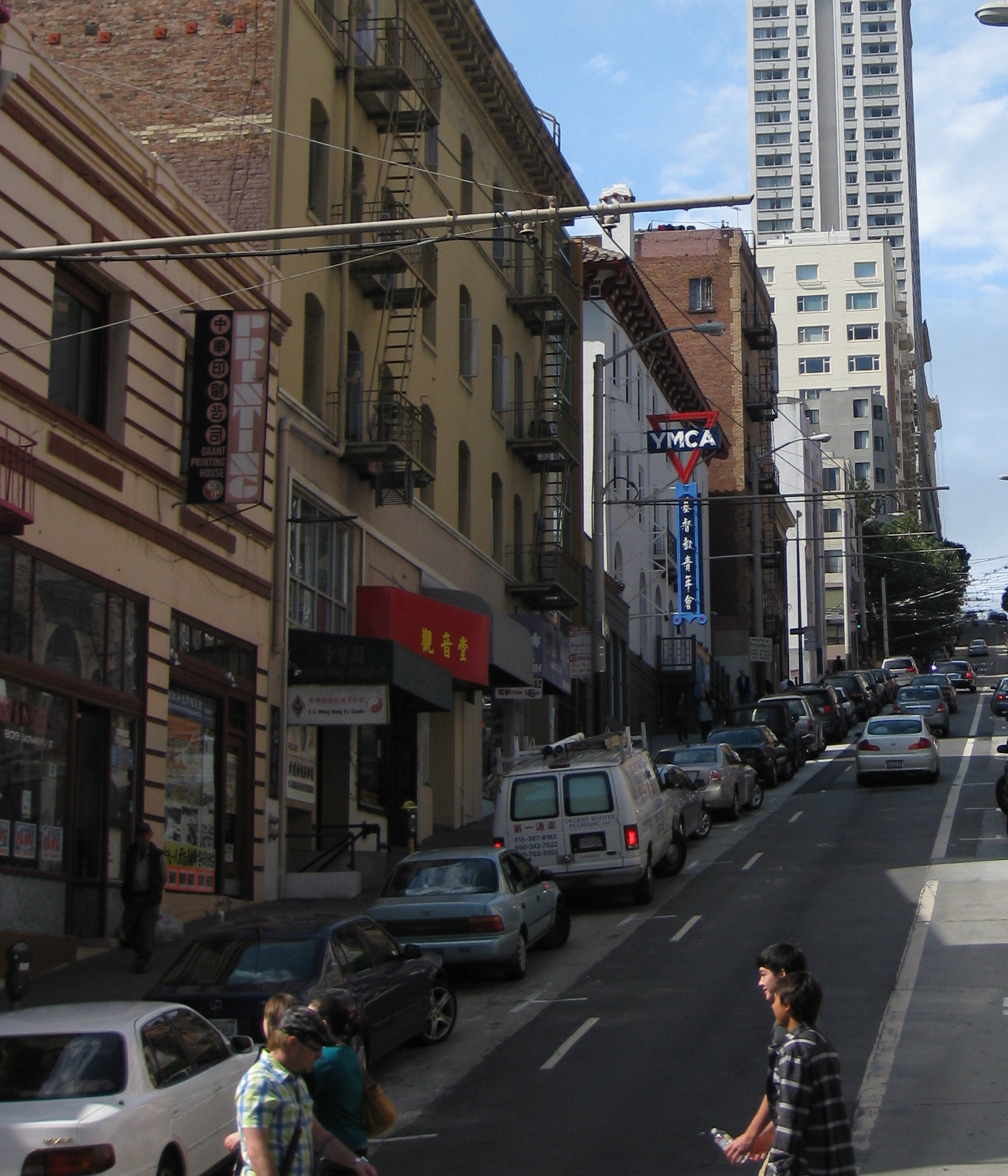
Former Headquarters of AsianWeek at 809 Sacramento (left edge of picture), near the corner of Grant and Sacramento

On August 20, 2007, AsianWeek launched a completely redesigned version of their website that is no longer live as of April 2011.

In March 2008, the AsianWeek Foundation was launched as a sister entity for organizing among East Asians. In January 2009, AsianWeek ceased operations.

The AsianWeek headquarters were located at 809 Sacramento Street in San Francisco's Chinatown, a building that had formerly housed "several different politically active Chinese American newspapers, in particular the Chung Sai Yat Po and the Chinese Nationalist Daily/Chinese Daily Post (Kuo Min Yat Po)" and in 2015 became the WWII Pacific War Memorial Hall museum initiated by Florence Fang.

In 2023, the Fang family launched a searchable online database with content from past AsianWeek issues, following an extensive digitization effort. At the time there were no plans to restart the paper.

== Editorial Focus ==
Asian Week provided “a documentary record of many important events that have affected the Asian American community.” Coverage of East Asian American issues included the killing of Vincent Chin, East Asian American college admissions, and quotas on Chinese students in competitive San Francisco school assignments.

=== Activism in politics ===
One of the paper’s most important focus areas for editorial coverage and advocacy was to increase representation of Asian Pacific Islanders in elected office. The front page of AsianWeek's premier issue blasted the headline “Democrats and Republicans Voice the Same Opinion: It’s time for More Asian Americans to Enter Politics.”

Beginning in 1984, AsianWeek began attending and covering the Democratic and Republican National Conventions every four years. AsianWeek's coverage was bipartisan including the publication of special sections for each of the political party’s conventions.

After the 1996 Democratic National Convention in Chicago, AsianWeek launched the Potstickers column written by Samson Wong as the first American political insider column focusing on Asian Pacific Islanders.

=== U.S Census ===
In 1977, the same year Fang began making plans for AsianWeek, the United States Office of Management and Budget ordered the U.S. Census Bureau and federal agencies to create a pan-ethnic Asian category, “Asian or Pacific Islander”. Prior to that, data were only collected in five sub-categories (Chinese, Japanese, Filipino, Korean, and Hawaiian). As the 1980 U.S. Census results were released, AsianWeek offered extensive editorial coverage in its pages which included special sections full of tables and figures.

AsianWeek continued its focus on Asian Pacific Islander demographics throughout the publication’s history. After the 1990 Census, AsianWeek published a booklet, Asians in America: 1990 Census. In the spring of 2003,AsianWeek partnered with the University of California at Los Angeles’ Asian American studies department to co-publish a book focused on 2000 U.S. Census data, titled The new Face of Asian Pacific America: Numbers, Diversity, and Change in the 21st Century.

=== Asians in American society ===
Much of AsianWeek's coverage highlighted Asian Pacific Islanders participating in all the different aspects of American society. As AsianWeek's Editor-in-chief Samson Wong (2001-2008) described it: “Beyond our common history and heritage, we’re also looking to identify our common futures as citizens in this country.”

AsianWeek often published features or special sections on East Asian American involvement in specific fields, for example, “Asian Americans going for the Gold” in the 2004 Olympic games; “Asian American War Heroes”, a listing of all the Asian Americans killed in action from the Afghanistan war, and “The 25 Most Influential APA Hollywood Pioneers". AsianWeek covered the founding of many Asian American organizations such as the National Asian Pacific American Women’s Forum. AsianWeek also helped start the National Association of Asian Publishers which was founded on the sidelines of the Newspaper Association of America annual marketing conference in 2008.

Books published by AsianWeek include the New Faces of Asian Pacific America (see above), and Amok, a compilation of columnist Emil Guillermo, which won the American Book Award in 2000.

== Major sections ==
=== Opinion ===
The Opinion section included AsianWeek's Letters to the Editor, Emil Guillermo's column "Amok", and a community contributed article, "Voices".

=== Nation and World ===
The Nation and World section included "Washington Journal" authored by columnist Phil Tajitsu Nash. It covered topics such as the 2008 Summer Olympics Torch Relay protests in San Francisco to national issues that affect East Asian Americans.

=== Bay and California ===
Headquartered in San Francisco, California, AsianWeek dedicated a section to issues and timely news items that are relevant to the Bay Area's East Asian Americans.

=== Arts and Entertainment ===
The Arts and Entertainment section included "Asian Eats", "AskQ" and "The Yin-Yang with Lisa Lee".

Asian Eats column provided an inside look at the Bay Area's East Asian American cuisine. Formerly known as "Picky Eater" the column covered price, environment, customer service, cleanliness, menu selection and taste of the Bay Area's most popular restaurants.

AsianWeek's AskQ was an advice column to reflect every-day life in Asian Pacific America. It included readers’ questions and solicited queries. Q is a tricenarian urban male who is "happily partnered—a manager by profession, a writer by desire", according to the column.

The "Yin-Yang" column was authored by Lisa Lee, an AsianWeek columnist who offered "a provocative look into the arts and entertainment industry. The Yin-yang Blog brings you up to date with Asian-American celebrity news, gossip and more."

== Controversies ==
=== Kenneth Eng ===
AsianWeek was severely criticized for publishing Why I Hate Blacks on February 23, 2007, a column by freelance writer Kenneth Eng. Prior to this incident, AsianWeek published other inflammatory race-themed columns by Eng, including: Proof that Whites Inherently Hate Us and Why I Hate Asians. Several Asian-American organizations called for an apology as well as a repudiation of the columnist and his views, and circulated an online petition to that effect.

AsianWeek published a front-page apology in its February 28 issue, severed all ties with Eng, held various public fora and declared that it was reviewing its editorial policy. AsianWeek also published in its March 16 issue of "Voices" an article titled "I'm Afraid and Feel Helpless" to tacitly repudiate all of Kenneth Eng's work without making any statements of its own that could add fuel to the fire. Then in late March 2007, AsianWeek quietly made editorial staff changes, evidenced in the masthead of its March 30 issue. Former editor-in-chief Samson Wong's title became Senior Editorial Consultant and Ted Fang (the son of James and Florence Fang), formerly editor-at-large, became Editor and Publisher.
