= Frits van Griensven =

Dutch public health scientist and epidemiologist

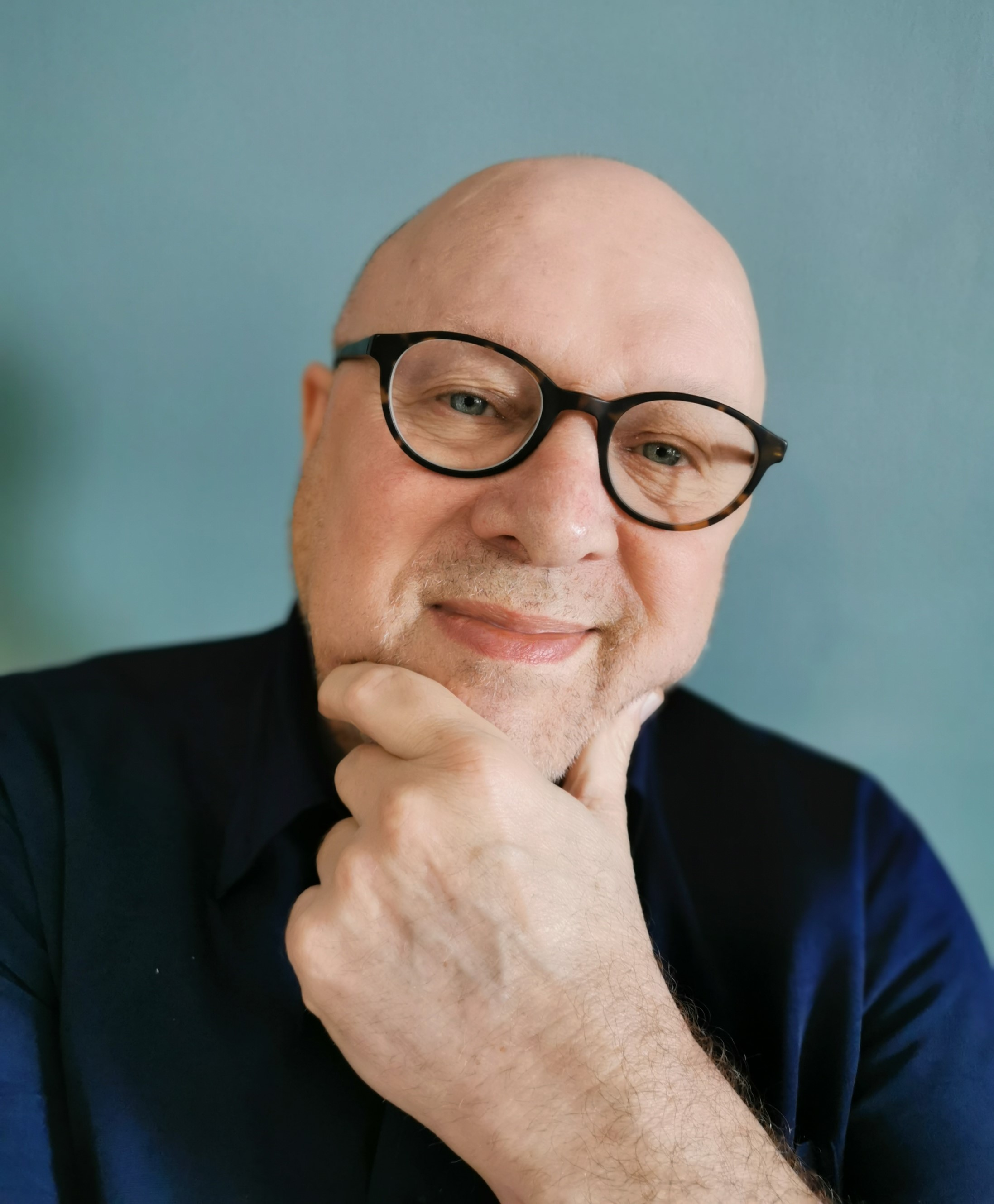
Frits van Griensven

Godefridus Johannes Petrus "Frits" van Griensven (born 8 July 1953, Eindhoven, The Netherlands) is a pioneering Dutch scientist in epidemiology, sociology and public health. Most of his work is on addressing the HIV epidemic among men who have sex with men and other HIV key populations.

== Education ==
van Griensven obtained a combined Masters of Science degree (in Sociological Research Methods and in Sociological Theory) at the Catholic University (currently known as Radboud University) of Nijmegen in 1984. He obtained his PhD in the Faculty of Medicine at the Academic Medical Center of the University of Amsterdam in 1989. He obtained an MPH degree in epidemiology at the School of Public Health at the University of California at Berkeley in 1991.

== Career ==
van Griensven started his career in HIV research at the Amsterdam Municipal Health Service in 1983. He represented the University of Utrecht in the AIDS Cohort Study Group, a multidisciplinary consortium of scientists from different institutions which established the Amsterdam Cohort Studies on HIV/AIDS. The first cohort consisted of homosexual men enrolled for assessment and follow-up at the Department of Public Health of Amsterdam, starting in 1984. van Griensven took part in the conceptualization and preparation of the study, designed the behavioral risk assessment instrument, performed statistical analysis and reported sexual and other risk factors for prevalent and incident HIV infection, which had not been scientifically assessed at the time. Subsequent cohort studies were in injecting drug users, high-risk heterosexuals, migrants, and young men who have sex with men.

In 1987 he was recruited by the Amsterdam Municipal Health Service to strengthen their HIV/AIDS research capacity and expand their research portfolio focusing on incident HIV infection, sexually transmitted diseases and progression of HIV infection to overt disease. He helped initiate international collaborative studies of incident HIV infection and AIDS in men who have sex with men in Amsterdam, New York City, San Francisco, Vancouver and Sydney. From 1988 to 1994 he worked on HIV disease distributions and predictors of time to different clinical outcomes and death, funded by the Dutch Ministry of Public Health. During this time he also conducted a population-based assessment of sexual behavior and established a new preparatory cohort of young men who have sex with men. These and other studies led van Griensven to receive his PhD by the Faculty of Medicine of the University of Amsterdam in April 1989.

In the same year he received a scholarship from the Sarphati Foundation to conduct post-doctoral research in the United States. He continued his studies and research into HIV infection and disease distribution at the School of Public Health of UC Berkeley and at the San Francisco Department of Public Health during 1990–1992.

Upon returning to Amsterdam in 1992, he was asked, on behalf of the Amsterdam Municipal Health Service to assist in European Commission supported HIV/AIDS Research and Training Programs, to formulate HIV responses in Thailand (1992-1998) and in China (1995-1998). In that capacity he helped design, conduct, and report systematic assessments of risk behavior and HIV prevalence among female sex workers in Northern and Southern Thailand and lectured in training courses for Chinese health officials in epidemiology and disease surveillance in Beijing and Shanghai. In addition, he organized fellowships and tutored Thai and Chinese laboratory and public health scientists in a variety of European countries. During this period, he was awarded grants to assess HIV infection in fishermen in the Gulf of Thailand (1995, Dutch Ministry of Foreign Affairs), to model the demographic impact of HIV/AIDS (1995, Thai Health Research Institute) and to study the impact of HIV/AIDS on mortality in Thailand (1996, Delegation of the European Commission in Thailand).

In 1995 van Griensven was appointed Professor of AIDS Epidemiology at Utrecht University in The Netherlands, an endowed chair supported by the Dutch AIDS Foundation. He also held professorial positions at the Bloomberg School of Public Health, Johns Hopkins University, Baltimore, MD, USA (2008 - 2012) and in the Department of Epidemiology and Biostatistics of the University of California at San Francisco, San Francisco, CA, USA (2000–present).

In 1998, van Griensven was recruited by US CDC as a senior behavioral scientist and epidemiologist and was stationed at the Thailand Ministry of Public Health - US Centers for Disease Control and Prevention Collaboration in Nonthaburi, where he initiated innovative research regarding the automated self-collection of sensitive biological and behavioral data and on HIV and STI prevalence in adolescents. He was also closely involved in the conduct of VAX003, the first HIV vaccine efficacy trial in injecting drug users in the developing world. Starting in the early 2000s, van Griensven led the first systematic HIV prevalence and incidence studies among MSM in Thailand and several other Asian countries, uncovering multiple severe epidemics of HIV infection in these populations, which had hitherto be unknown about outside the Western hemisphere. In response, he founded the Silom Community Clinic in Bangkok, which also served as the venue for the Bangkok MSM Cohort Study, a longitudinal investigation of prevalent and incident HIV infection in MSM, of which he was the principal investigator. This clinic also successfully participated in several biomedical HIV prevention trials in MSM. In 2005–6, van Griensven directed a mental health survey among adult and children survivors of the Boxing-day tsunami in 2004; this work was considered to be a unique systematic assessment of the social impact immediately after one the most severe natural disasters in human history.

van Griensven played an important role in putting the worsening HIV epidemic among men who have sex with men and transgender women on the agenda of policy makers and donor organizations, by bringing together research findings from different countries and cities in scientific publications that are widely read and used

After he retired from CDC, van Griensven took a position with the Thai Red Cross AIDS Research Center as Senior Advisor for HIV Prevention, where he continued supporting research aimed at understanding and responding to the HIV pandemic among MSM and other key populations in Southeast Asia. The well-being of transgender people and the alleviation of the HIV epidemic and its social sequelae in this population became a key focus of his work in this period. For this purpose, van Griensven took the initiative to establish the Tangerine Clinic in Bangkok, a primary care facility dedicated to improving the health of transgender people which has since become a model for comprehensive health care for transgender people in the region.

van Griensven was among a small group of pioneering thinkers in the early days of HIV chemoprophylaxis research envisioning a crucial role for intermittent and event-driven HIV pre-exposure prophylaxis, as essential tools to control HIV infection in MSM and other key populations.

== Honors and awards ==
- 2006 - CDC Director's Award in Recognition for Tsunami Response, US Centers for Disease Control and Prevention, Atlanta, GA, USA
- 2017 - HIV, Equality and Rights Award (HERO Award), Asia-Pacific Network for Male Sexual Health (APCOM), Bangkok, Thailand
- 2017 - LGBTI Rights and Health Advocacy Award (Ardhanareeswara Award), Rainbow Sky Association of Thailand and partners, Bangkok, Thailand
- 2018 - Knighthood in the Order of the Lion of the Netherlands (this is the highest and oldest Dutch order of chivalry in the Netherlands), Cabinet of His Majesty the King, The Hague, the Netherlands
- 2019 (also in 2004 and 2006) - Charles C Shepard Award for Scientific Study (nomination), US Centers for Disease Control and Prevention, Atlanta, GA USA
