= June 2006 San Francisco general election =

The June 2006 San Francisco general elections were held on June 6, 2006, in San Francisco, California. The elections included one seat to the San Francisco County Superior Court and four San Francisco ballot measures.

== Superior Court ==
Incumbent judge Lillian K. Sing won reelection.

San Francisco County Superior Court Seat 8 election, 2006
Candidate	Votes	%
Lillian K. Sing (incumbent)	79,953	68.28
Eric M. Safire	36,637	31.29
Write-in	501	0.43
Invalid or blank votes	40,281	25.78
Total votes	156,272	100.00
Turnout	{{{votes}}}	37.11%

== Measures ==
Note: "City" refers to the San Francisco municipal government.

San Francisco voters voted in favor of Proposition B, requiring property sellers to disclose details of past evictions to potential buyers.

=== Proposition A ===

Proposition A would allocate $10 million from the city's General Fund for the next three fiscal years for violence prevention and intervention services, to establish a Homicide Prevention Planning Council to develop and annually revise a Homicide Prevention Plan, and to create the position of Survivors' Advocate and a Survivors' Fund under the auspices of the District Attorney.

Proposition A
Choice	Votes	%
For	66,982	49.24
Against	69,060	50.76
Total	136,042	100.00
Valid votes	136,042	87.05
Invalid/blank votes	20,230	12.95
Total votes	156,272	100.00
Registered voters/turnout		37.11

=== Proposition B ===

Proposition B would require landlords to, before offering to sell buildings of two or more residential units, disclose to all potential buyers the specific legal grounds for any evictions resulting in vacant lots at the time of sale, and to disclose whether the tenants were elderly or disabled.

Proposition B
Choice	Votes	%
For	71,440	52.22
Against	65,373	47.78
Total	136,813	100.00
Valid votes	136,813	87.55
Invalid/blank votes	19,459	12.45
Total votes	156,272	100.00
Registered voters/turnout		37.11

=== Proposition C ===

Proposition C would change the city's appointment process to the Transbay Joint Powers Authority by designating the Mayor and two members of the Board of Supervisors to represent the city.

Proposition C
Choice	Votes	%
For	37,030	28.28
Against	93,905	71.72
Total	130,935	100.00
Valid votes	130,935	83.79
Invalid/blank votes	25,337	16.21
Total votes	156,272	100.00
Registered voters/turnout		37.11

=== Proposition D ===

Proposition D would create the Laguna Honda Hospital Special Use District encompassing the Laguna Honda Hospital and Rehabilitation Center, limit the patients who can receive care at Laguna Honda Hospital and certain other facilities, and allow privately owned residential health care facilities to operate in "public" districts.

Proposition D
Choice	Votes	%
For	35,418	26.34
Against	99,060	73.66
Total	134,478	100.00
Valid votes	134,478	86.05
Invalid/blank votes	21,794	13.95
Total votes	156,272	100.00
Registered voters/turnout		37.11
