= San Francisco Independent =

Newspaper in San Francisco, California

- Type: Free Newspaper
- Owner: Pan Asia Venture Capital Corporation
- Publisher: Ted Fang
- Founded: 1958
- Ceased publication: July 2005
- Headquarters: 1201 Evans Avenue, San Francisco, California; 94124
- Circulation: 550,00 per week
- Price: free (advertising-supported)

The San Francisco Independent was the largest non-daily newspaper in the United States. It helped to popularize the free newspaper (advertising supported) as a business model at the beginning of the 21st century, and also rescued one of the city's two major daily newspaper, the afternoon / evening San Francisco Examiner (founded 1863, and purchased 1880 by U.S. Senator George Hearst, then passed on in 1887 to son and later longtime famous national newspaper syndicate titan William Randolph Hearst, senior, 1863–1951, and flagship since 1880 of his subsequent national newspaper publishing syndicate). The efforts of the Fang family through its purchase to keep it from being shut down a century and a half later by the descendent Hearst Communications media empire, after they bought the longtime morning competitor, the San Francisco Chronicle with its De Young family ownership in 2000 from the remaining family ownership members.

The Independent publication was founded in 1958 as a neighborhood newspaper originally called the Lake Merced Independent. Marsha Fontes, a local historian, took the reins two decades later in 1979, covering its suburban residential area, institutions surrounding the public water reservoir of Lake Merced, in the southwest part of San Francisco, California. She sold it after almost a decade of work to Ted Fang and the Asian American descendent Fang family in 1987. As the new editor and publisher, Fang almost immediately began ambitiously growing The Independent, expanding its printed appearance from a tabloid format into a standard broadsheet sized page preferred by more major newspapers and extending its circulation / distribution zone citywide in the following year of 1988. Six years later in 1993, Fang purchased a chain of weeklies in suburban San Mateo County owned by the Chicago Tribune and its longtime owner, national media syndicate, the Tribune Company. By 1998 all of the San Francisco Bay area with the San Francisco-Oakland-Berkeley metropolitan area publications were reorganized and re-branded to be known simply as The Independent (without a geographic or city designation presaging its future multi-city regional expansion and vision). A decade later at the beginnings of the 21st century, in 2000, the Fang family then moved into national political media attention by purchasing the longtime Hearst Communications (media syndicate) flagship, the "San Francisco Examiner', one of the Bay Area region's two major daily papers (The Examiner originally owned by late-19th and early-20th centuries newspaper syndicate legendary mogul / titan William Randolph Hearst, 1863–1951) and so the Fangs became the first Asian American family to run a major daily newspaper in America.

The Independent covered neighborhood stories and issues that affected the development of the San Francisco Bay area during this period, and each issue of the bi-weekly had twelve different editorial editions tailored to the city and suburbs on the peninsula to the south of different neighborhoods. Among the issues championed by The Independent included saving Laguna Honda Hospital and re-building it into one of the largest skilled nursing facilities in the country. The Independent''s campaigning editorial positions also helped set the direction for San Francisco's future into the 21st century, helping to elect the first police chief to serve as Mayor of San Francisco, the first African American to serve as Mayor of the city, and one of the most progressive / liberal positioned city prosecutors / district attorneys in America for the City of San Francisco.

The Independent was a key player in the last chapter of the San Francisco's newspaper wars in the controversies in the competition ongoing between the longtime two remaining major daily papers Examiner and Chronicle' left-over from the original half-dozen daily publications that once competed for readers and attention, circulated and served during the 19th and beginning of the 20th centuries, when reading was the main form of mass communication media, (before the competition of additional outlets of radio and television stations news departments starting in the late 1940s). During those 1990s, "papers war", the San Francisco Bay area was one of the then few remaining American cities / metro areas with still competing papers of different owners. The Independent twice sued both of the city's daily newspapers, the Examiner and Chronicle, over monopolistic business practices by both of the major dailies. And all three newspapers frequently covered the activities of their competitors, with articles about each other in sometimes disparaging terms. The media campaign in the Bay area even was described by the national journalism / publishing industry's trade publication Editor & Publisher magazine.

As of 2000, The Independent was distributed three times in the week, but by March 2001, The Independent had ceased delivering to homes on Saturdays, being distributed only at newsstands and as an insert into the newly acquired San Francisco Examiner according to its also widespread in the last three decades, with the new computer media with its internet website and online news source "SFGate". The newspaper has since stopped publication as it reorganized and redeveloped the Examiner as a free advertising -supported only, daily newspaper, plus its temporary expansion into several other American cities with newly established Examiner competing printed papers there, such as the brief Baltimore Examiner in 2006–2010, and still continuing of the formerly printed but now online publication (in 2024) of the nearby Washington Examiner, which has adopted a more right-wing Conservative political editorial positions on national and international issues and offering a competing views in a national voice (compared to its competition there in the national / federal capital of the longtime media leader The Washington Post).

== Growth of The Independent ==
When Marsha Fontes sold the San Francisco Independent in 1987, she generated $5,000 per week in advertising revenue. Ted Fang was running his family's printing business where the Independent was being printed, and negotiated a deal to purchase the tabloid from Fontes. It was the first time Fang would take on the title of Editor and Publisher. Later media coverage popularized the story of the Independent being given to Fang as a birthday present from his parents John and Florence Fang. Ironically when Fang took over the San Francisco Examiner thirteen years later, this story came to mirror William Randolph Hearst's story of receiving the SF Examiner newspaper as a gift from his father exactly a century earlier in 1887.

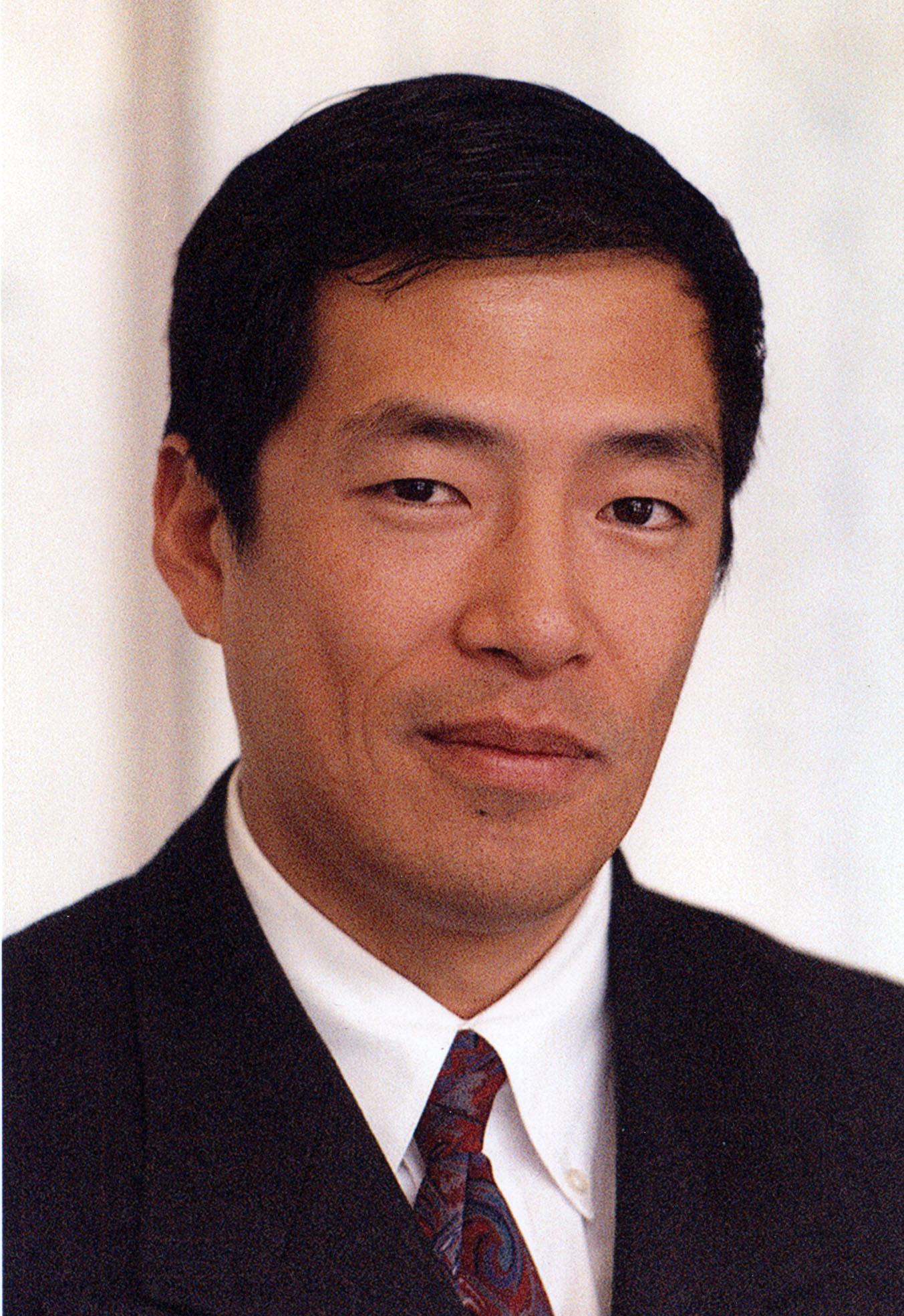
Ted Fang

Under new ownership, the Independent quickly took a more aggressive approach to growth and that summer launched a challenge to the largest and oldest community paper, the San Francisco Progress, by submitting a bid to publish the public notices for the city and becoming the Official Newspaper of San Francisco. Although the Independent was ultimately not successful in securing that advertising contract, the next year the scrappy newspaper was successful in pulling the bulk of the real estate community's advertising away from the Progress and into a new publication printed by the Independent. Then, on December 15, 1988, the San Francisco Progress shut its doors, ceased publication and filed for bankruptcy. In six days, on December 21, 1988, the Independent converted from a tabloid size to the traditional broadsheet newspaper size and increased circulation from 80,000 to 180,000.

Over the next ten years, the Independent continued its growth pace, beginning three times a week publication in 1990, and then purchasing a chain of weeklies owned by the Chicago Tribune in 1993. The six mastheads included Burlingame Hillsborough Boutique & Villager, San Carlos Belmont Enquirer-Bulletin, Foster City Progress, Redwood City Tribune, San Mateo Weekly and Millbrae Sun. Later The Independent also acquired the Redwood City Almanac. By 1997, the weeklies began publishing twice weekly and in 1998, the Independent Newspaper Group officially became America's largest non-daily newspaper, when its eight Bay Area mastheads all changed their names to The Independent.

The following August, the Hearst Corporation, owners of the San Francisco Examiner and the largest private publishers in the world, announced their purchase of the morning daily San Francisco Chronicle. They also claimed the San Francisco Examiner was not a viable business operation and planned to shut it down. The Independent led an effort to keep the Examiner open, and ultimately the U.S. Department of Justice under Attorney General Janet Reno forced the Hearst's to sell the SF Examiner to the Fang family in 2000.

== Editorial focus of The Independent ==
The Independent started as a neighborhood newspaper, carrying advertisements from neighborhood businesses and covering local news for neighborhood residents. Fang continued this "pro-neighborhood stance inspired by grass roots reporting" even as the paper grew to cover all of San Francisco and the San Francisco peninsula. The Independent achieved this through the use of targeting editorial content in 12 different zones over its total circulation of 379,000 copies covering from San Francisco through Redwood City.

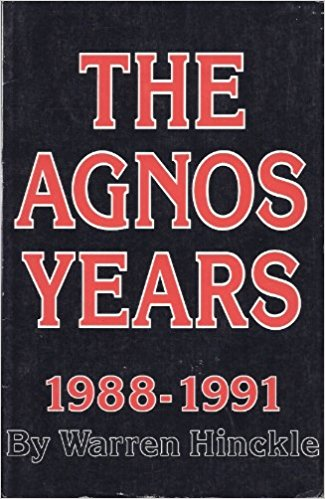
Agnos years cover

The Independent was an avid protector of the free press and a fighter for more open government. One of the Independent's first major actions under Fang was to file suit against the City and County of San Francisco to open up closed-door meetings being held by then Mayor Art Agnos and some of the city supervisors. Fang and The Independent were also a co-founder of the California Free Press Association to advocate for the needs of free newspaper publishers.

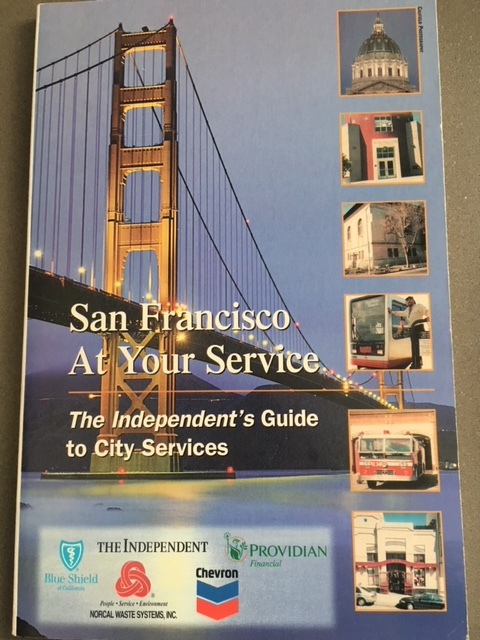
City Services book published by SF Independent

Generally representing a non-establishment viewpoint, The Independent's editorial coverage became more ambitious and strident as the newspaper grew. In the 1990s for example, The Independent began an "aggressive public awareness and voter education campaign with the goal of raising hundreds of millions of dollars to build a new state-of-the-art facility" for Laguna Honda Hospital. With political consultant Jack Davis, Independent columnist Warren Hinckle, healthcare union leader Sal Roselli and Public Health Department Director Dr. Mitchell Katz, among others, the "Laguna Honda First" campaign resulted in a $400 million rebuild of the institution as the only publicly funded long-term care facility of its kind in the U.S.

The Independent also became a leading voice in citywide elections. In 1991, The Independent published its first book, The Agnos Years, a collection of Warren Hinckle's columns critical of then Mayor Art Agnos. Up to that point, the SF Examiner – and its publisher William Randolph Hearst III – had been the leading editorial voice in San Francisco politics. That year, Hearst fired Hinckle and endorsed Agnos' re-election during the runoff. When Agnos was unseated by political newcomer and former police chief Frank Jordan, backed by The Independent, it also intensified the newspaper feud into open editorial warfare. The following year, Hearst retired as publisher to become a venture capitalist.

The Independent backed the election of Mayor Willie Brown in 1995 and partnered with Brown's administration on a number of neighborhood and diversity initiatives for San Francisco. The Independent also supported the crime prevention policies of then Supervisor Terence Hallinan in his successful campaign to become San Francisco District Attorney. Fang served as co-chair of District Attorney Hallinan's transition committee.

== Newspaper wars ==
As the first prominent Asian American publishers in the news industry, and as the first neighborhood publication to aggressively challenge San Francisco's entrenched establishment and longstanding major newspapers, the Fangs and The Independent were alternately scrutinized and underestimated. Bud Liebes, 10-year chair of San Francisco State University's journalism department scoffed at the Independent's plan to expand citywide distribution, telling the SF Examiner that the Independent's presses were the most antiquated he had ever seen. Liebes was a former Examiner reporter with deep contacts at both dailies.

In 1992, the newspaper industry magazine Editor and Publisher characterized The Independent and SF Examiner relationship as "Newspapers feuding in San Francisco". In fact, The Independent first sued the SF Examiner and SF Chronicle publishers in 1989, accusing the two dailies of using predatory business practices and below cost pricing to undercut The Independent's citywide expansion. During a brief détente after John Fang (Ted's father) passed suddenly in 1992 the lawsuit was settled between both parties. But it was quickly revived in 1993. The Independent won a jury trial with punitive damages, but the verdict was overturned on appeal in 2000.

Meanwhile, the editorial attacks continued to appear prominently in news pages for all San Franciscans to read. The SF Examiner assigned three reporters to investigate James Fang, Ted's brother, who had been appointed as San Francisco's Director of Commerce and Trade by new Mayor Frank Jordan. The three investigative reporters published five front page stories in a week, accusing James of "pumping up" his resume.

The Independent was also known for its animosity toward the Examiner and began running a weekly comic strip called "Mr. Sharon Stone," a dig at Phil Bronstein, who was executive editor of the Examiner and married to actress Sharon Stone. Independent columnist Warren Hinckle, who had formerly worked at the Examiner, described The Independent's coverage of his former newspaper "a holy crusade".

When the Hearst Corporation proposed shuttering the SF Examiner, The Independent led a campaign to stop Hearst's takeover of the SF Chronicle until they relented. The Independent ran front page pictures of San Franciscans like Andre Siordia, an employee of Casa Sanchez restaurant hanging up signs to "Stop the Phoney Sale – Keep San Francisco a 2 newspaper town.

In turn, San Francisco Chronicle reporter Carolyn Said conducted an informal poll of people in San Francisco's Financial District and revealed complete dismissal of the Independent. Said Brian Antonio, a clerk at the Pacific Stock Exchange of The Independent: "Oh, that's the one nobody reads. That's the one that goes right in the recycling bin."

== Pioneering newspaper family ==
The Independent developed the free-newspaper business model to a new level, with all revenue generated from advertising sources and no paid subscription revenue. The Independent also did not sell copies through newsracks. This mirrored the emerging model of internet news during those times, where news information is available free to consumers and not just available to those who could afford to pay for a newspaper. In 1994, The Independent waged a campaign to have San Francisco place its public notices in free newspapers to make them more accessible to the public. This resulted in San Francisco's legal notice advertising moving out of the SF Examiner and SF Chronicle, and into the SF Independent and newspapers targeting minority populations.

The Independent received a significant source of revenue from legal notices, which brought in an estimated $917,670 in 2000.

The added effect of the free newspaper model was to develop targeted advertising down to the zip code and even sub-zip code level. This was a revolutionary approach to newspapers which had in the past only published advertising throughout the paper's circulation network no matter how distant from the advertiser's location. It also foreshadowed the micro-targeting now available in digital marketing campaigns.

The Fang's were the first Asian American family to build a newspaper chain and ultimately own a major U.S. daily newspaper. They were also one of the first Asian American families to gain prominence in a major American city, and also at the state and national level. Ted's father John Fang was a newspaper pioneer in his own right, serving as Editor and Publisher of the Young China Daily News which was started by modern China's founding father Sun Yat Sen. In 1979, John also started AsianWeek, the national English language newspaper known as the "Voice for Asian America."

The Fangs and The Independent were proponents of diversity in their own businesses and in society at large. They supported Willie Brown as the first African American to serve as mayor of San Francisco and encouraged diversity among department heads including the first gay man to run the SF Department of Public Works and the first African American to serve as Fire Chief. The San Francisco Police Department also made great strides, with its first Asian American police chief, first African American police chief and first female police chief during this period.

== Purchase of San Francisco Examiner ==
The Fang family heavily protested the proposed purchase by Hearst, owner of the San Francisco Examiner, of the San Francisco Chronicle, saying it would hurt the Independent. Eventually, the Examiner was sold to The Independent by Hearst to avoid anti-trust litigation. Critics, like former campaign manager and failed mayoral candidate Clint Reilly made wild accusations against The Independent and Fang, falsely claiming that Fang would make a salary of $500,000 per year, four times his salary at The Independent. In addition, under the terms of the deal, Reilly and his hired lawyers alleged that the Fang family could pocket half of every dollar over $15 million of the $25 million subsidy they received from Hearst.

All of the critics charges proved false and Fang's purchase of the Examiner was approved in federal court.

== Political bias ==
The Independent was widely considered to reflect the political biases of the Fang family.

In 1991 Independent columnist Warren Hinckle wrote a booklet attacking then-mayor Art Agnos, which was published and distributed by the Fang family's printing company.

The Fang family was active in fundraising for Willie Brown and Terence Hallinan and the family's printing company printed campaign literature for Hallinan. Ted Fang was named to Hallinan's transitional team after he was elected, and James Fang was named to Brown's.

More criticism centered around city loans given to Pan Asia Venture Capital Corp., owned by the Fang family. The company was given a $650,000 loan from the Mayor's Office of Community Development, which came with stipulations against political use. However, in 1999, the Coalition of San Francisco Neighborhoods and Harvey Milk Lesbian Gay Bisexual Transgender Club both passed resolutions calling on the Independent to cease advocating for Brown and Hallinan and criticizing their opponents.

The newspaper was also criticized by Chronicle columnists in 1996 for taking sides in a San Mateo County Board of Supervisors race, working to defeat incumbent Mary Griffin. Ted Fang denied the accusations that he was slanting his newspaper's coverage against Griffin, and said, "I've expressed my personal opinion. That has nothing to do with editorial coverage." Adding, regarding Griffin's refusal to be interviewed by editorial board of the Independent: "Anytime a politician becomes so powerful they can choose which newspaper they want to talk to, or don't want to talk to, I think that's when the citizens of the county should be afraid."

Ted Fang has defended his newspaper's actions, saying, "We fight for what we believe in."

San Francisco Chronicle managing editor Daniel E. Rosenheim in 1995 rated The Independent staff young and hard-working commenting, "I find some of their coverage enlightening."
