= John Fang =

- Born: Fang Ta-ch'uan; 27 May 1924; Shanghai, Republic of China
- Died: 27 April 1992 (aged 67); San Francisco, California, US
- Education: National Chengchi University
- Occupations: Businessman, publisher, writer
- Known for: Founder, Chinatown Handy Guide and AsianWeek
- Spouse: Florence Fang (m. 1960)
- Children: 3 sons

John Ta Chuan Fang (Chinese: 方大川; pinyin: Fāng Dàchuān; Wade–Giles: Fang^{1} Ta^{4}-ch'uan^{1}; 27 May 1924 – 27 April 1992) was an American businessman, publisher, and writer based in San Francisco. He was the founder of Chinatown Handy Guide and AsianWeek.

== Early life ==
Fang was born in Shanghai, China in 1924. He earned a bachelor's degree in journalism at Taipei's National Chengchi University and worked there for the government-controlled New Life newspaper. In 1952, he moved to San Francisco to study at UC Berkeley.

== Career ==
Fang started out on his own by publishing the Chinatown Handy Guide in 1959, a series of booklets to the Chinatowns in major US cities, as they were emerging as tourist attractions.

In 1979, he founded AsianWeek, and its headquarters were in San Francisco's Chinatown.

== Personal life ==
In 1960, he married Florence Fang, and they had three sons.

Fang died on April 27, 1992.
