= Flintstone House =

Experimental domed residence in Hillsborough, California

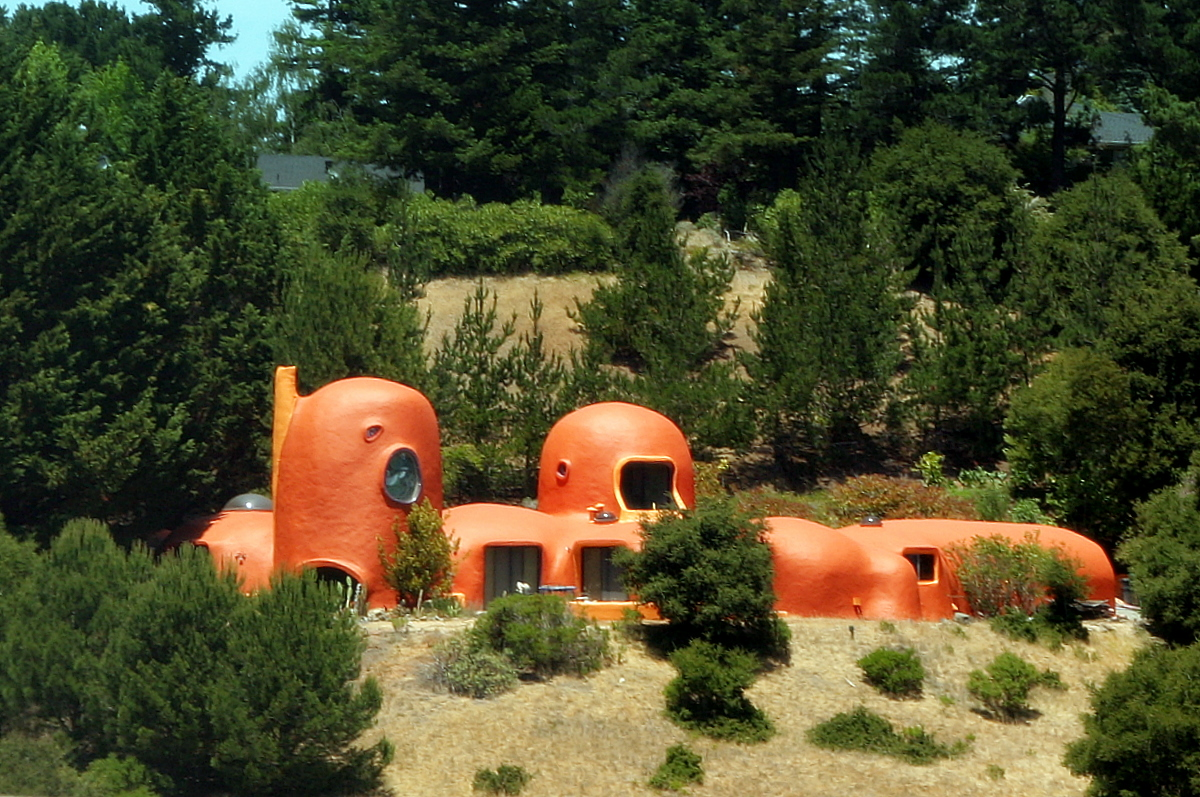
- View from Doran Memorial Bridge on Interstate 280 (June 2007)
- Interactive map of the Flintstone House area

General information
- Type: Residence
- Architectural style: Free-form dome
- Location: 45 Berryessa Way, Hillsborough, California, United States
- Coordinates: 37°31′52.7″N 122°21′32.4″W
- Completed: 1976
- Renovated: 1987

Height
- Height: approx. 20 ft (6 m)

Technical details
- Structural system: Shotcrete on steel
- Floor area: 3,200 ft^{2} (297 m^{2})

Design and construction
- Architect: William Nicholson

The Flintstone House is a free-form, single-family residence in Hillsborough, California, overlooking and easily seen from the Doran Memorial Bridge carrying Interstate 280 over San Mateo Creek.

== History ==
=== Design ===
The house was designed by architect William Nicholson and built in 1976 as one of several experimental domed buildings using new materials. The idea takes its inspiration from the airframe homes designed by architect Wallace Neff.

Built on a concrete slab foundation, the residence was constructed by spraying shotcrete onto steel rebar and wire mesh frames over inflated aeronautical balloons.

It was built by a company named Fame Homes and designed to resist wildfires and earthquakes. The home's first owners were Tyrone and Norma Thompson and Mrs. Thompson planned to give lectures and tours of the home once it was completed.

It has approximately 2,700 sq ft (250 m^{2}) of living space including three bedrooms, one accessed via a spiral staircase inspired by an ice cream cone that at the top is the same diameter as the room, and two bathrooms, and has a two-car garage. All the interior surfaces are rounded, and the master bathroom has a floor of rocks instead of tiles.

Originally off-white in color, the house was repainted deep orange in 2000, and one of the domes was later painted purple.

=== Nicknames ===
The house is known popularly as the "Flintstone House", from The Flintstones, a Hanna-Barbera Productions animated cartoon series of the early 1960s about a Stone Age family. It is also known as the Dome House, the Gumby House, the Worm Casting House, the Bubble House, and "The Barbapapa House", from Barbapapa, a character and series of books created by Annette Tison and Talus Taylor in the 1970s.

=== Disrepair, restoration and remodeling ===
By the mid-1980s the house had fallen into disrepair, as water runoff from higher on the mountainside damaged the foundation, causing the walls to crack. After failed attempts at sealing the cracks, it was extensively restored in 1987.

San Francisco Bay Area architect Eugene Tsui undertook remodeling the house during the 2000s. The results of Tsui's remodeling appears as the "Edises Kitchen" project, pictured on Tsui's website. Tsui's original concept for the remodel, including a proposed complementary second residence on the property, is detailed in depth on his site.

In September 2015, the home went up for sale with a price tag of $4.2 million. With no luck finding a buyer, the home came back on the market in early 2017 at the reduced price of $3.2 million. In June 2017, it finally sold for $2.8 million.

In late 2017, the new owners installed large oxidized steel sculptures of dinosaurs, a woolly mammoth, a giraffe, and Fred Flintstone in the yard.

=== Legal dispute ===
The house was unpopular with some neighbors and inspired the formation of a local architectural review board. In March 2019, the town of Hillsborough filed a complaint against the owner of the house, Florence Fang. The complaint alleged that the owner's modifications were a "public nuisance" and that she did not receive the proper permits for her modifications. In March 2019, Fang retained the law offices of former San Francisco Mayor Joseph L. Alioto and Angela Alioto to respond to the Hillsborough complaint. The lawsuit was settled in June 2021 allowing the modifications to stay, with Fang receiving $125,000 from the city.

=== Attempt at commercial use ===
In 2024, the city of Hillsborough halted plans for a private dining experience at the house. The proposed venture would have offered multi-course meals to paying guests; however, city officials determined that this constituted commercial use, in violation of the property's single-family residential zoning.
