= Friends of Laguna Honda Hospital =

Friends of Laguna Honda is a name used over the years by Laguna Honda Hospital Volunteers supporting Laguna Honda Hospital and Rehabilitation Center (LHH), a 62-acre skilled nursing and rehabilitation center owned and operated by the San Francisco Department of Public Health.

== Committee to Save Laguna Honda ==
The first recorded usage of the name Friends of Laguna Honda occurred in the late 1990s as supporters of Laguna Honda Hospital rallied to save the institution from being shut down. The hospital faced a host of challenges including antiquated facilities, dwindling staff numbers, and a potential cut off of federal funding of $250,000 per day in Medicare and Medi-Cal payments due to overcrowding and poor conditions. An expensive renovation and rebuilding of the hospital was required. In early 1998, an influential group of San Franciscans with diverse interests formed the “Laguna Honda First Committee.” This group advocated that a bond measure for Laguna Honda Hospital should be approved before passing bond measures to support any other causes or institutions. At the time, the De Young Museum, Academy of Sciences, and the Conservatory of Flowers all were seeking to pass bond measures.

A $503 million bond measure was proposed in July 1998, but as the largest ever bond measure at the time, it faced difficult prospects for gaining voter approval. Organizers of the Laguna Honda First Committee changed their name to “Friends of Laguna Honda” to focus on developing a new lower cost bond measure. After the bond amount was reduced to $299 million, supporters changed their name again to the committee to Save Laguna Honda and led the campaign for voter approval of this bond measure. That bond measure passed successfully in November 1999.

== Laguna Honda Hospital Volunteers, Inc. ==
Laguna Honda Hospital Volunteers, Inc. was founded in 1956, received non-profit status in 1957, and “financially supported both the patients at Laguna Honda, and LHH’s cadre of volunteers.” In 1999, it was a major supporter of the committee to Save Laguna Honda, contributing $250,000 to the campaign committee to ensure passage of the $299 million bond measure.

After the bond measure passed, Louise Renne, who retired as City Attorney in 2002, started up the new Laguna Honda Foundation in 2003. Renne's LH Foundation was active in doing public relations, including the re-branding of LHH Volunteers Inc. In 2010, LHH Volunteers, Inc. first adopted the business alias of Friends of Laguna Honda, and underwent a re-branding campaign over the next few years. During this time, LHH Volunteers, Inc suffered a dramatic fall off in donations, while LHH Volunteers Inc. grants to Laguna Honda Hospital patient activities and support services dropped even more dramatically.

Today LHH Volunteers, Inc., dba Friends of Laguna Honda, supports non-medical programs and services to enhance the quality of life for the residents at Laguna Honda Hospital and Rehabilitation Center

The re-branded Friends of Laguna Honda's website describes its first projects as providing “modern metal wheelchairs, visitors’ lounge and dining room furnishings, a color television, a player piano, power tools for the craft shop, equipment for a new beauty parlor, a sound system for the Gerald Simon Theater, and much more.”

Friends of Laguna Honda states it provides residents of LHHRC with ongoing programs including “helping to fund the hospital’s Animal Assisted Therapy and Horticultural programs, sponsoring community outings—Bay cruises, museum visits, movies, picnics, ball games, and bowling—and supporting Art With Elders” .

== Hospital Facility ==
Laguna Honda Hospital and Rehabilitation Center (LHHRC) is the only publicly funded long-term care facility of its kind in the U.S. It is also the first LEED-certified green hospital in California.

In 2019, state investigators found that patient abuse was occurring at the hospital. Laguna Honda was forced to change procedures and adopt a strict reporting program.

In July, 2021, Laguna reported two non-fatal patient overdoses. By October of that year, a state audit begin in response to that report. The audit's determination was that Laguna had fallen out of compliance with their 2019 requirements. The hospital was forced to develop a remediation plan that could be implemented no later than April 2022, eliminating illicit drug paraphernalia and safety issues form the site.

By January 2022, the state determined that the hospital still had issues, finding bathroom smoking, and a lighter in an oxygen-rich environment. On March 22, the hospital was declared in jeopardy of noncompliance with Federal regulations. If continued, the hospital could lose its Medicare and Medicaid funding, which would force it to close.

The hospital cleared that status within a week, by restricting what visitors could bring in, adding safety searches, and other new procedures. Additionally, the hospital planned more measures, such as potentially scanning visitors at entry.
