= Shotcrete =

Pneumatically projected concrete

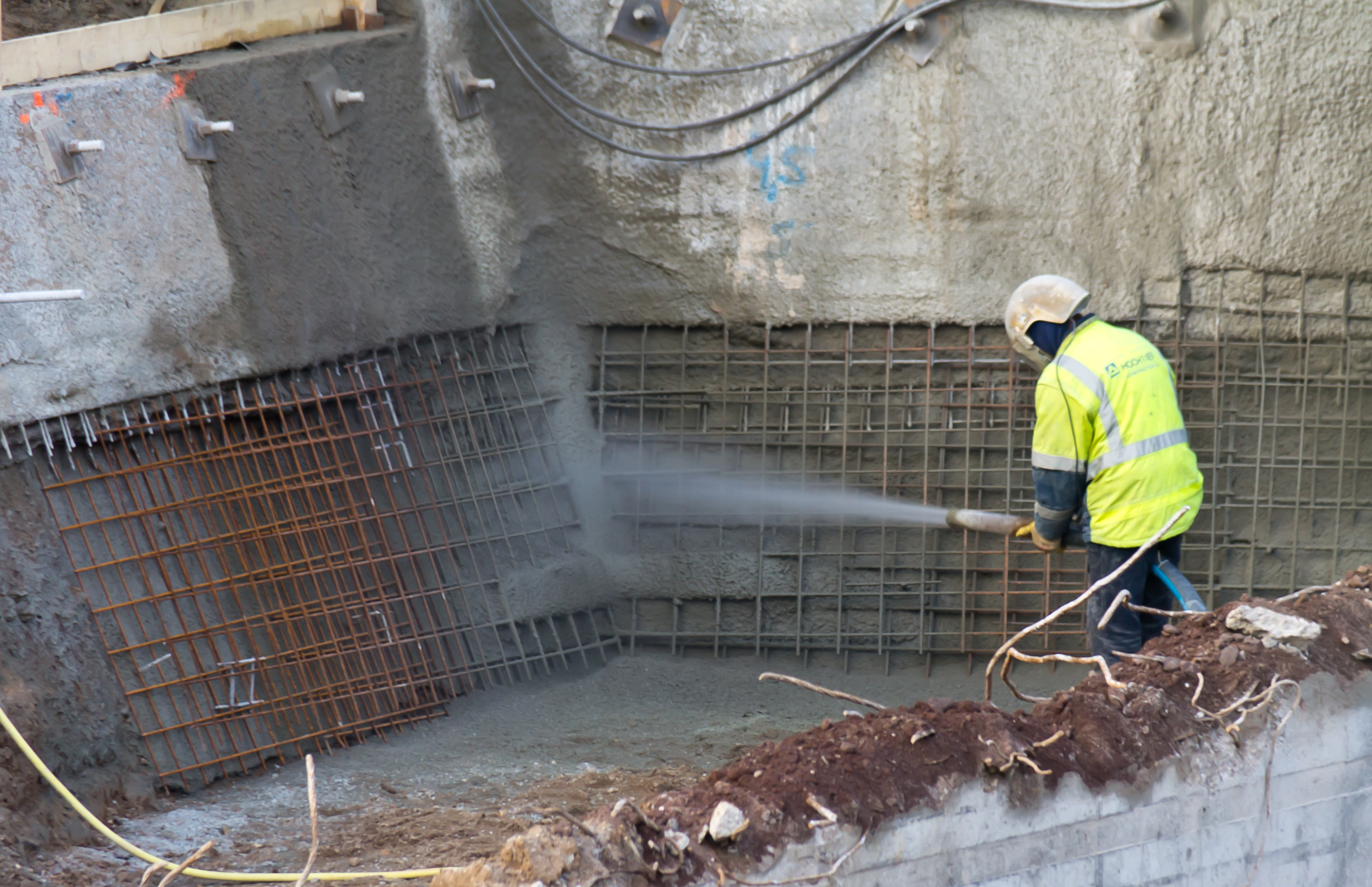
A building worker spraying shotcrete on welded wire mesh

Shotcrete, gunite (/ˈɡʌnaɪt/), or sprayed concrete is concrete or mortar conveyed through a hose and pneumatically projected at high velocity onto a surface. This construction technique was invented by Carl Akeley and first used in 1907. The concrete is typically reinforced by conventional steel rods, steel mesh, or fibers.

The concrete or mortar is formulated to be sticky and resist flowing when at rest to allow use on walls and ceilings, but exhibit sufficient shear thinning to be easily plumbable through hoses.

Shotcrete is usually an all-inclusive term for both the wet-mix and dry-mix versions invented by Akeley. In swimming pool construction, however, shotcrete refers to wet mix and gunite to dry mix. In this context, these terms are not interchangeable.

Shotcrete is placed and compacted/consolidated at the same time, due to the force with which it is ejected from the nozzle. It can be sprayed onto any type or shape of surface, including vertical or overhead areas.

Shotcrete has the characteristics of high compressive strength, good durability, water tightness and frost resistance.

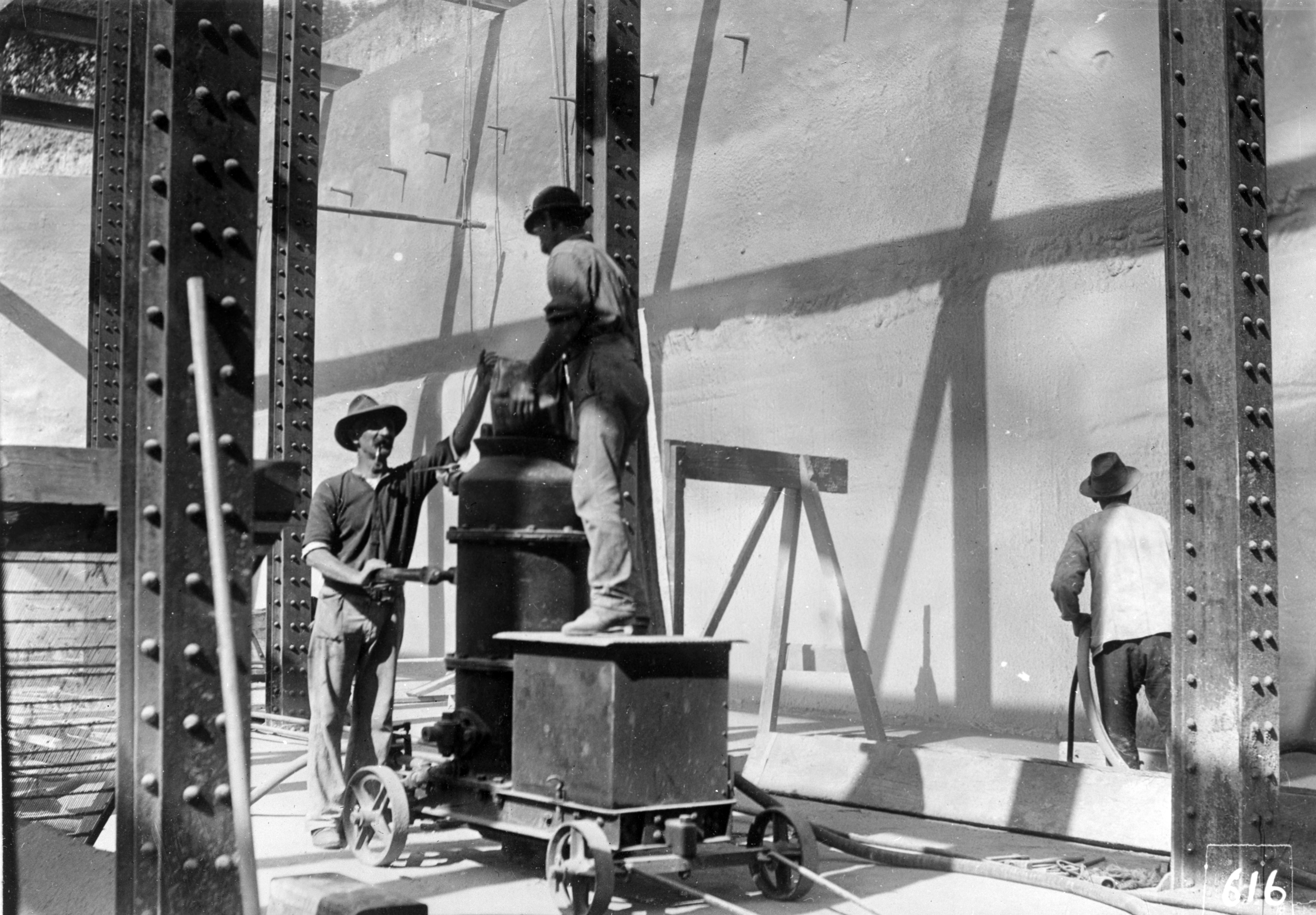
Early cement gun, Sydney 1914

== History ==
Shotcrete, then known as gunite, was invented in 1907 by American taxidermist Carl Akeley to repair the crumbling façade of the Field Columbian Museum in Chicago (the old Palace of Fine Arts from the World's Columbian Exposition). He used the method of blowing dry material out of a hose with compressed air, injecting water at the nozzle as it was released. In 1911, he was granted a patent for his inventions: the "cement gun", the equipment used; and "gunite", the material that was produced. There is no evidence that Akeley ever used sprayable concrete in his taxidermy work, as is sometimes suggested. F. Trubee Davison covered this and other Akeley inventions in a special issue of Natural History magazine.

The dry-mix process was used until the wet-mix process was devised in the 1950s. In the 1960s, an alternative method for gunning dry material with a rotary gun appeared, using a continuously fed open hopper.

The nozzle is controlled by hand on small jobs, such as a modest swimming pool. On larger work it is attached to mechanical arms and operated by hand-held remote control.

== Dry vs. wet mix ==
The dry mix method involves placing the dry ingredients into a hopper and then conveying them pneumatically through a hose to the nozzle. The nozzle operator controls the addition of water at the nozzle. The water and the dry mixture is not completely mixed, but is completed as the mixture hits the receiving surface. This requires a skilled nozzle operator, especially in the case of thick or heavily reinforced sections. Advantages of the dry mix process are that the water content can be adjusted instantaneously by the nozzle operator, allowing more effective placement in overhead and vertical applications without using accelerators. The dry mix process is useful in repair applications when it is necessary to stop frequently, as the dry material is easily discharged from the hose. A disadvantage to the dry mix method is dust and higher rebound.

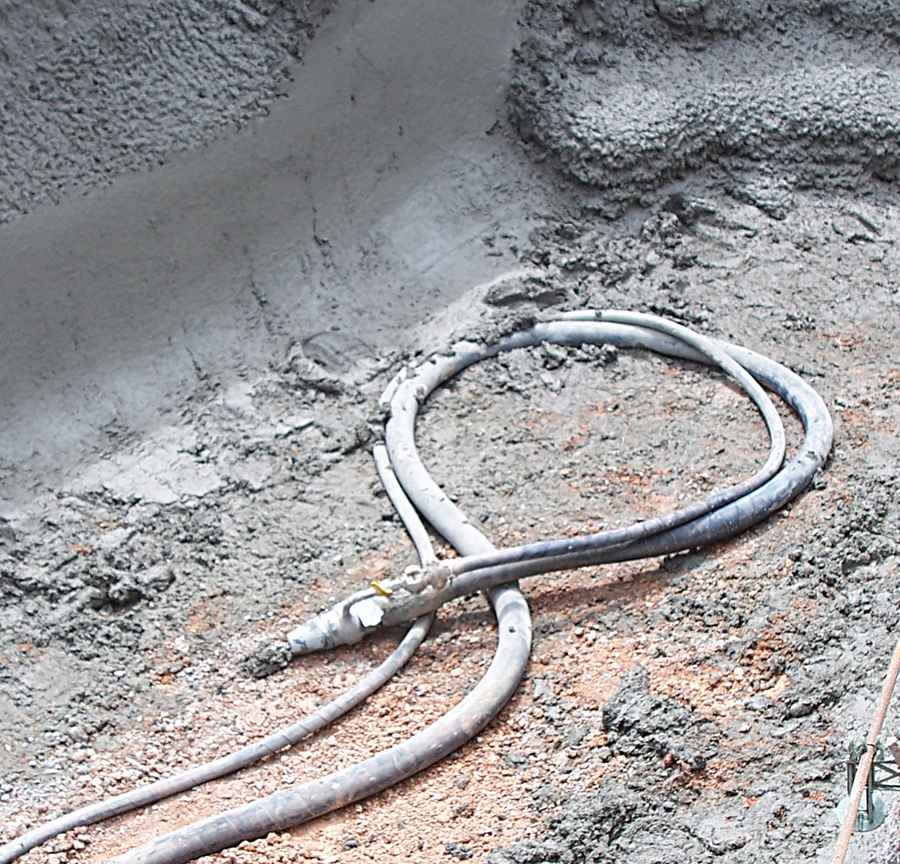
Shotcrete nozzle with 75 mm concrete hose from line pump and 20 mm compressed air line

Wet-mix shotcrete involves pumping of a previously prepared concrete, typically ready-mixed concrete, to the nozzle. Compressed air is introduced at the nozzle to impel the mixture onto the receiving surface. The wet-process procedure generally produces less rebound, waste (when material falls to the floor), and dust compared to the dry-mix process. The greatest advantage of the wet-mix process is all the ingredients are mixed with the water and additives required, and also larger volumes can be placed in less time than the dry process concrete.

== Shotcrete machines ==
Shotcrete machines are available which control the complete process and make it very fast and easy. Manual and mechanical methods are used for the wet spraying process but wet sprayed concrete is traditionally applied by machine. The high spray outputs and large cross-sections require the work to be mechanised. Concrete spraying systems with duplex pumps are mainly used for working with wet mixes. Unlike conventional concrete pumps, these systems have to meet the additional requirement of delivering a concrete flow that is as constant as possible, and therefore continuous, to guarantee homogeneous spray application.

Depending on the fineness of the filler, mortar shotcrete (fraction size up to 2.5 mm) is distinguished from shotcrete (up to 10 mm), and syringe concrete, or sprayed concrete (up to 25 mm).

== Shotcrete vs. gunite ==
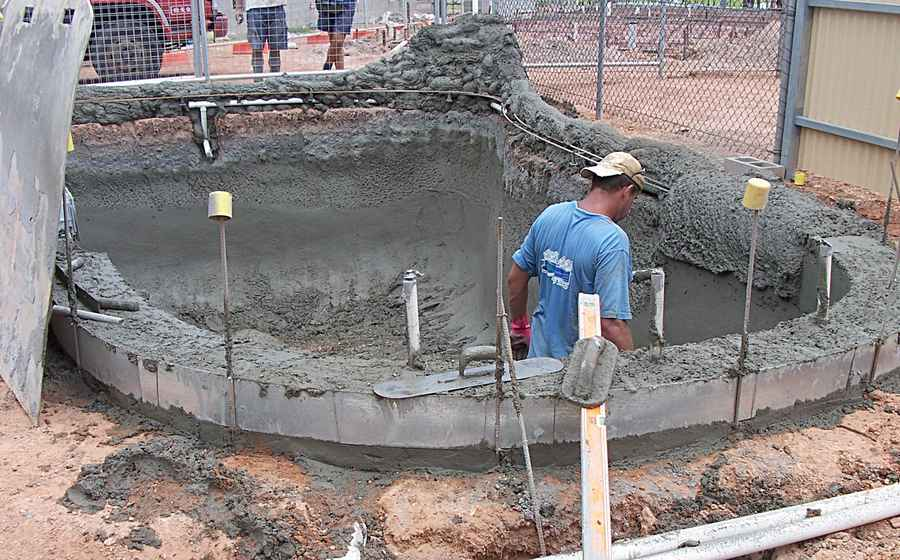
Shotcrete swimming pool under construction in Northern Australia

Gunite was originally a trademarked name that specifically referred to the dry-mix pneumatic cement application process. In the dry-mix process, the dry sand and cement mixture is blown through a hose using compressed air, with water being injected at the nozzle to hydrate the mixture, immediately before it is discharged onto the receiving surface. Gunite was the original term coined by Akeley, trademarked in 1909 and patented in North Carolina. The concrete mixture is applied by pneumatic pressure from a gun, hence gun-ite.

The term Gunite became the registered trademark of Allentown Equipment, the oldest manufacturer of gunite equipment. Other manufacturers were thus compelled to use other terminology to describe the process such as shotcrete, pneumatic concrete, guncrete, etc.

Shotcrete is an all-inclusive term for spraying concrete or mortar with either a dry or wet mix process. However, shotcrete may also sometimes be used to distinguish wet-mix from the dry-mix method. The term shotcrete was first defined by the American Railway Engineers Association (AREA) in the early 1930s. By 1951, shotcrete had become the official generic name of the sprayed concrete process—whether it utilizes the wet or dry process.

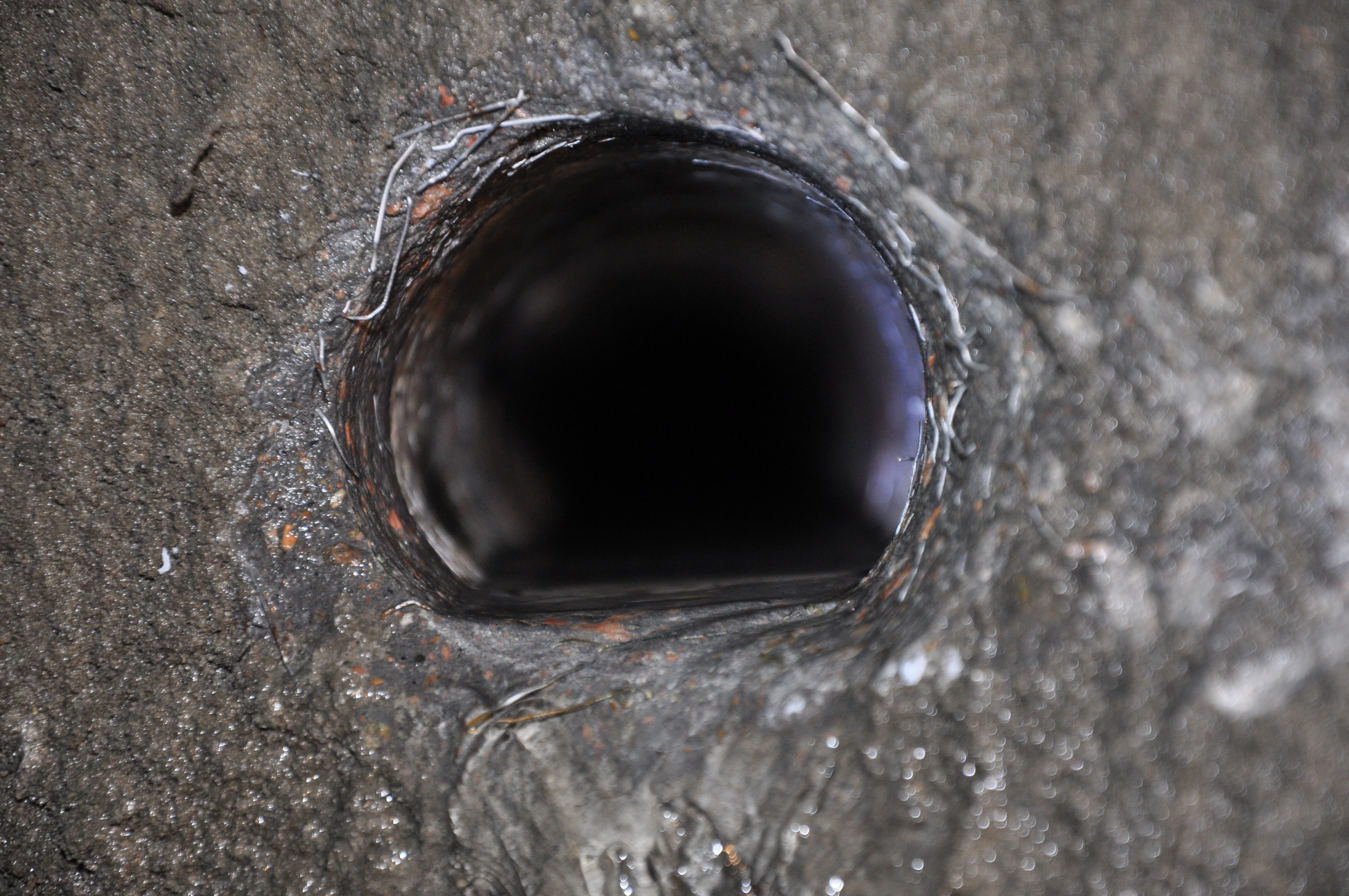
A 76 mm borehole in fibre-reinforced shotcrete on a tunnel wall

== Applications ==
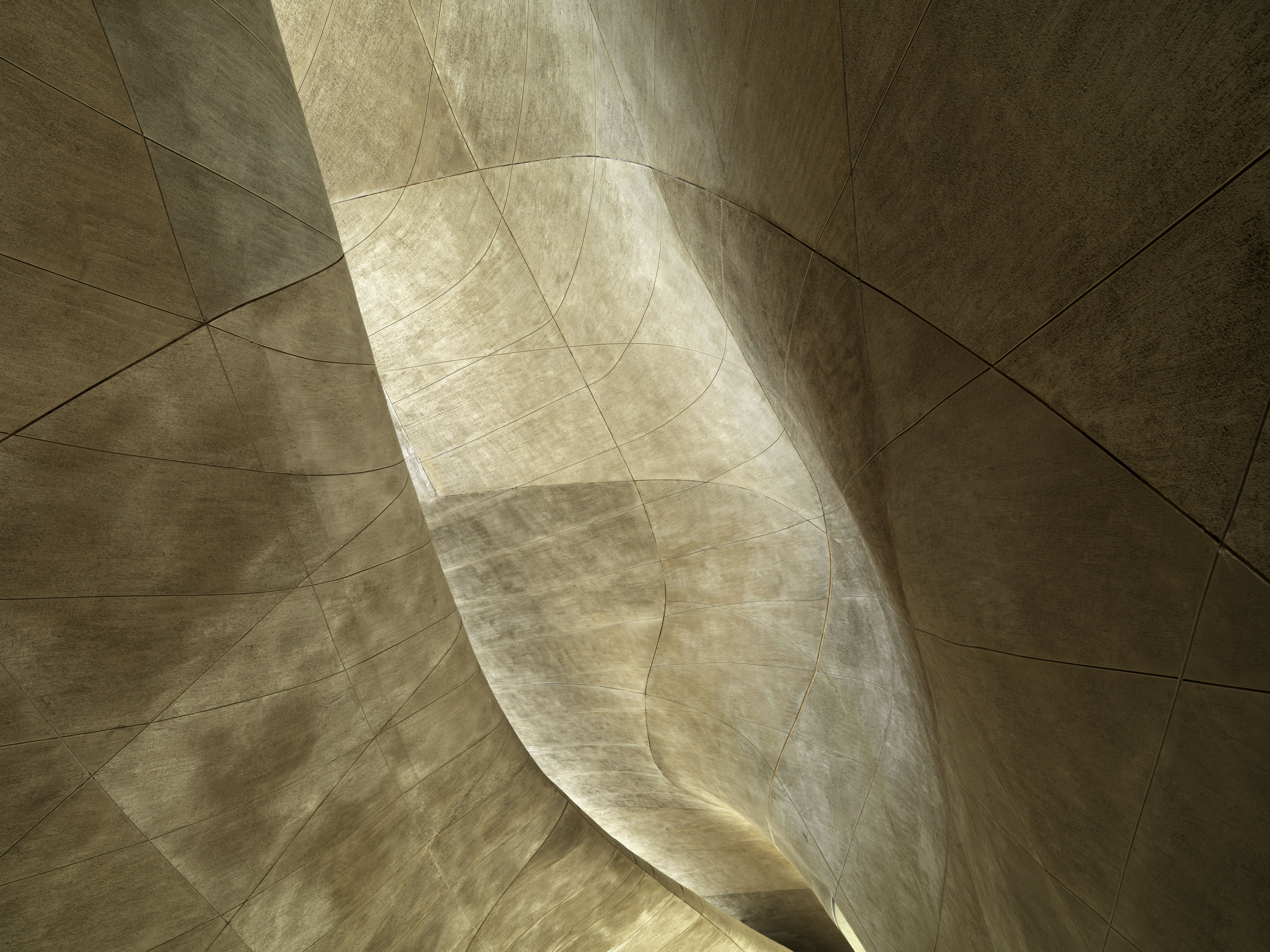
A shotcrete curvelinear wall at the Museum of the History of Polish Jews in Warsaw, Poland

Shotcrete is commonly used to line tunnel walls, in mines, subways, and automobile tunnels. Fire-resistant shotcrete developed in Norway is used on the Marmaray tunnel in Istanbul.

Shotcrete is used to reinforce both temporary and permanent excavations. It may be employed, in concert with lagging and other forms of earth anchor, to stabilize an excavation for an underground parking structure or hi-rise buildings during construction. This provides a large waterproof enclosure in which a structure can be erected. Once the structure is completed the area between its foundation and the shotcrete is backfilled and compacted.

Shotcrete is also a viable means and method for placing structural concrete.

Shotcrete is very useful in hard rock mining. Development of decline pathway to go underground is critical for movement of heavy machinery, miners, and material. Shotcrete helps make these paths safe from any ground fall.

Also, the shotcrete is carried out much faster than the repair mixtures usual non-mechanized application.

== See also ==
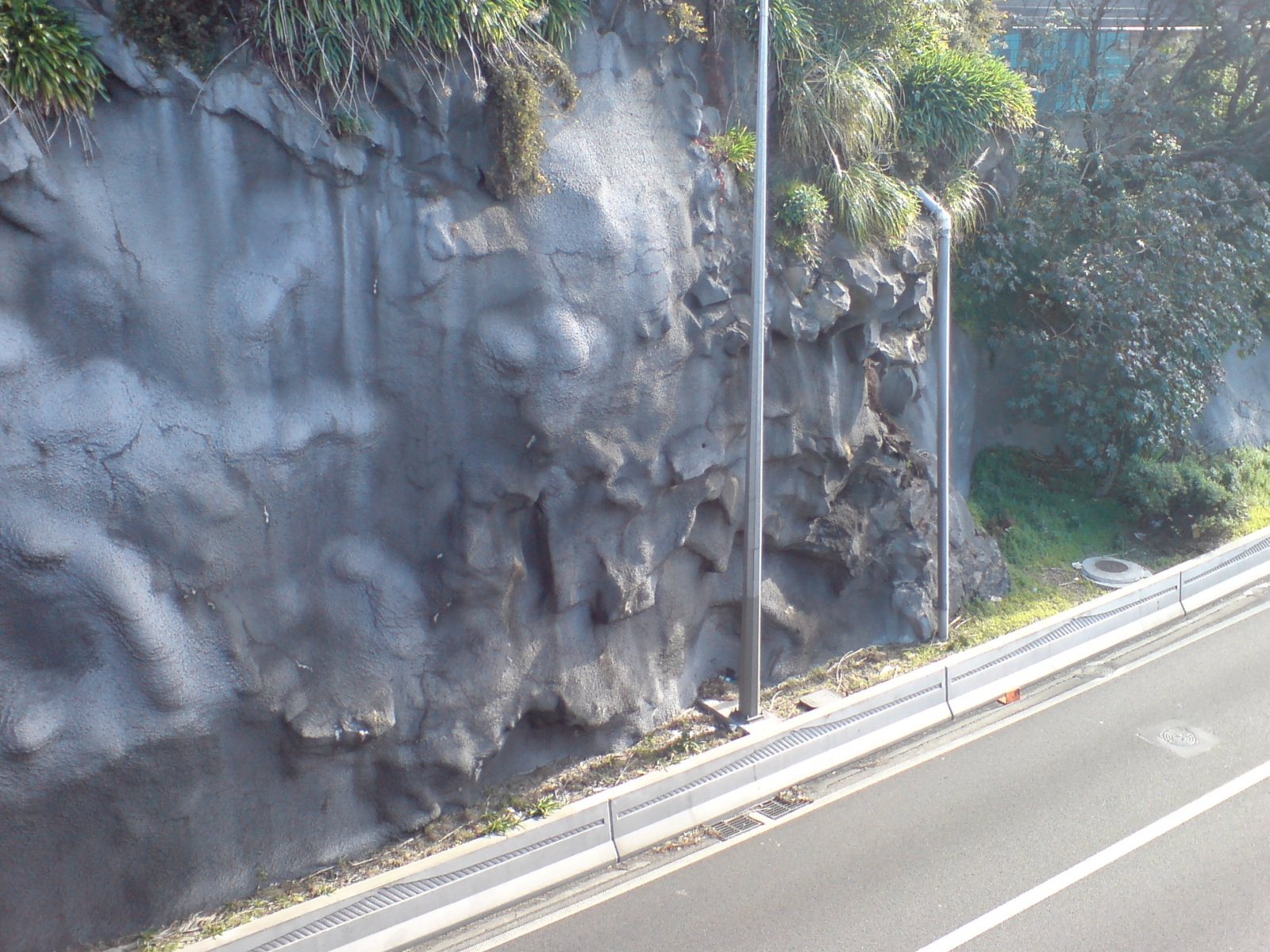
Shotcrete-stabilized cliff above a motorway in New Zealand

- Cement
- Rebar
- Reinforced concrete
- Slurry wall
- Structural engineering
- Flintstone House – an example of shotcrete housing construction
