= Florence Fang =

Chinese-American businesswoman and publisher

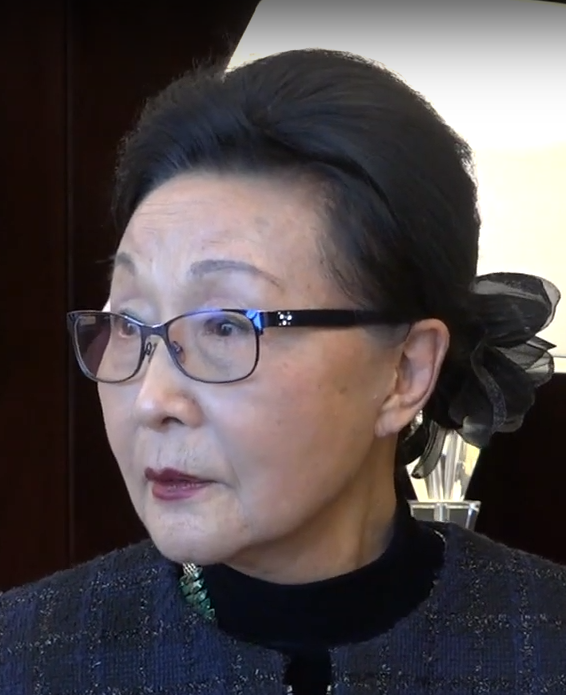
- Fang ca. 2020
- Born: 1933 or 1934 (age 92–93); Beiping (now Beijing), Republic of China
- Occupations: Businesswoman, publisher and philanthropist
- Known for: Owner of The Flintstone House
- Spouse: John Ta Chuan Fang (m. 1960; died 1992)
- Children: 3 sons

Florence Fang
- Chinese: 方李邦琴
Transcriptions
Standard Mandarin
- Hanyu Pinyin: Fāng Lǐ Bāngqín
- Wade–Giles: Fang1 Li3 Bang1-ch'in2

Li Bangqin
- Chinese: 李邦琴
Transcriptions
Standard Mandarin
- Hanyu Pinyin: Lǐ Bāngqín
- Wade–Giles: Li3 Bang1-ch'in2

Florence Fang (Chinese: 方李邦琴; born 1933/1934) is a Chinese-American businesswoman, publisher, and philanthropist active in the San Francisco area. She is the former owner of the San Francisco Examiner and other media titles and has been a fund-raiser for the Republican Party. She is the owner of The Flintstone House in Hillsborough, California, themed on The Flintstones cartoon series.

== Early life ==
Fang was born Li Bangqin (Chinese: 李邦琴; Wade–Giles: Li Pang-ch'in) in Beijing, and moved to Taiwan in 1949 with some of her family. Fang lived in Taiwan until 1960, when she met and married John Ta Chuan Fang and they migrated to San Francisco.

== Business career ==
Fang and her husband bought Chinese language media titles, before expanding into English-language titles including AsianWeek and the San Francisco Independent.

By 2000, she had sold the "opulent" Grand Palace Restaurant in San Francisco's Chinatown. In 2000, when the Hearst Corporation was facing antitrust concerns (including from Fang) over its acquisition of the San Francisco Chronicle, she acquired the San Francisco Examiner from them for $100 while also receiving a $66 million subsidy from Hearst to run the Examiner for three years, becoming the first Asian American to own a major daily newspaper in the US. In 2004, she sold it to Philip Anschutz for $11 million.

In 2008, Forbes reported that the Internal Revenue Service claimed that the Fang family had understated taxable income by $31 million in the years up to 2002. Florence, her two sons and her dead son's estate launched four counter-claims.

== Philanthropy and political activities ==
=== Involvement in US politics ===
During Fang's ownership, the Grand Palace restaurant had been the "scene of many political gatherings", and the Fangs were "important fund-raisers" for the Republican Party, meeting President George H. W. Bush several times. Bush appointed Fang to the Small Business Administration. In 2019, the San Francisco Chronicle described Fang as having close ties to Democrat politicians as well, including Nancy Pelosi and Dianne Feinstein, and as having been "a key player in the elections of former San Francisco Mayors Frank Jordan and Willie Brown." On the other hand, in 2000 it characterized Chinatown community activist Rose Pak, "who, until the Fangs gained ascendance with Jordan's election, had the ear of City Hall exclusively" as Florence Fang's "archenemy."

=== Higher education ===
In 2013, Florence Fang donated $1 million to launch the "100,000 Strong Foundation" with the aim of promoting Mandarin language education in the US and sending 100,000 US students to study in China within four years. From 2008 to 2013, she donated $2.5 million to finance a building of the School of Chinese as Second Language on the campus of Peking University, which was named the Florence Lee Fang Building. In 2006, UC Berkeley's East Asian Library received $3 million from Fang.

=== PR China and Taiwan ===
Florence Fang is the founder and (as of 2016) honorary president of the Northern California Association for the Promotion of the Peaceful Reunification of China (also known as Chinese for Peaceful Unification-Northern California or Northern California Peaceful Reunification Society), an overseas chapter of the China Council for the Promotion of Peaceful National Reunification, which is a subsidiary organization of the Chinese Communist Party (CCP) that promotes the goal of the PR China gaining control over Taiwan. Chinese media have reported Fang as saying that it was her aim to "prevent the spread of 'Taiwan independence' ideology"; and she called Taiwan a "fake democracy" at appearances with CCP officials.

=== Florence Fang Asian Community Garden ===
The Florence Fang Asian Community Garden (FFACG) opened in 2014 in San Francisco's Bayview-Hunters Point neighborhood, on land owned by Caltrain. U.S. House Minority Leader Nancy Pelosi led the ground breaking ceremonies. FFACG sits on the land of the former Demattei farm, San Francisco's last commercial farm, which had been operating as late as 1988. It was overseen by Florence Fang's son Ted Fang.

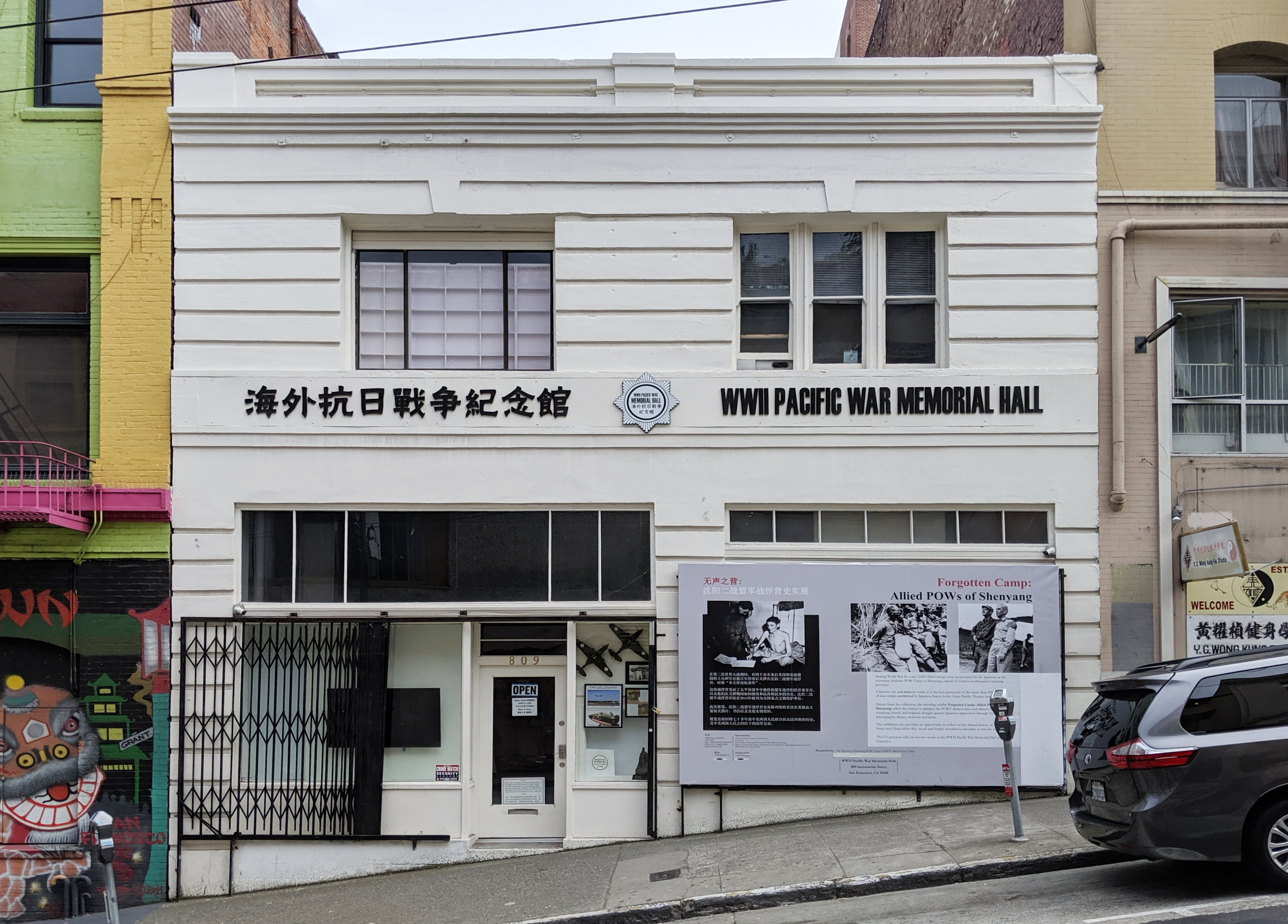
WWII Pacific War Memorial Hall (in 2019)

=== WWII Pacific War Memorial Hall ===
Florence Fang initiated the WWII Pacific War Memorial Hall, a two-story museum inaugurated in 2015 on the 70th anniversary of the surrender of Japan that marked the end of World War II. It is located in San Francisco's Chinatown at 809 Sacramento Street, a building that formerly housed the headquarters of AsianWeek and "several different politically active Chinese American newspapers, in particular the Chung Sai Yat Po and the Chinese Nationalist Daily/Chinese Daily Post (Kuo Min Yat Po)."

The historian Denise Y. Ho described it as an example of how museums "play an important role in 'telling China's story well' for global audiences," and as "look[ing] remarkably like a Chinese museum, featuring a sculpture 'Great Wall of Blood and Flesh' that evokes the Chinese national anthem." After closing for 16 months due to the COVID-19 pandemic, the museum reopened in 2021 with a new exhibition focusing on the collaboration of the US and China against Japan during World War II, which Fang called "our [countries'] lasting memory" in a speech at the reopening ceremony.

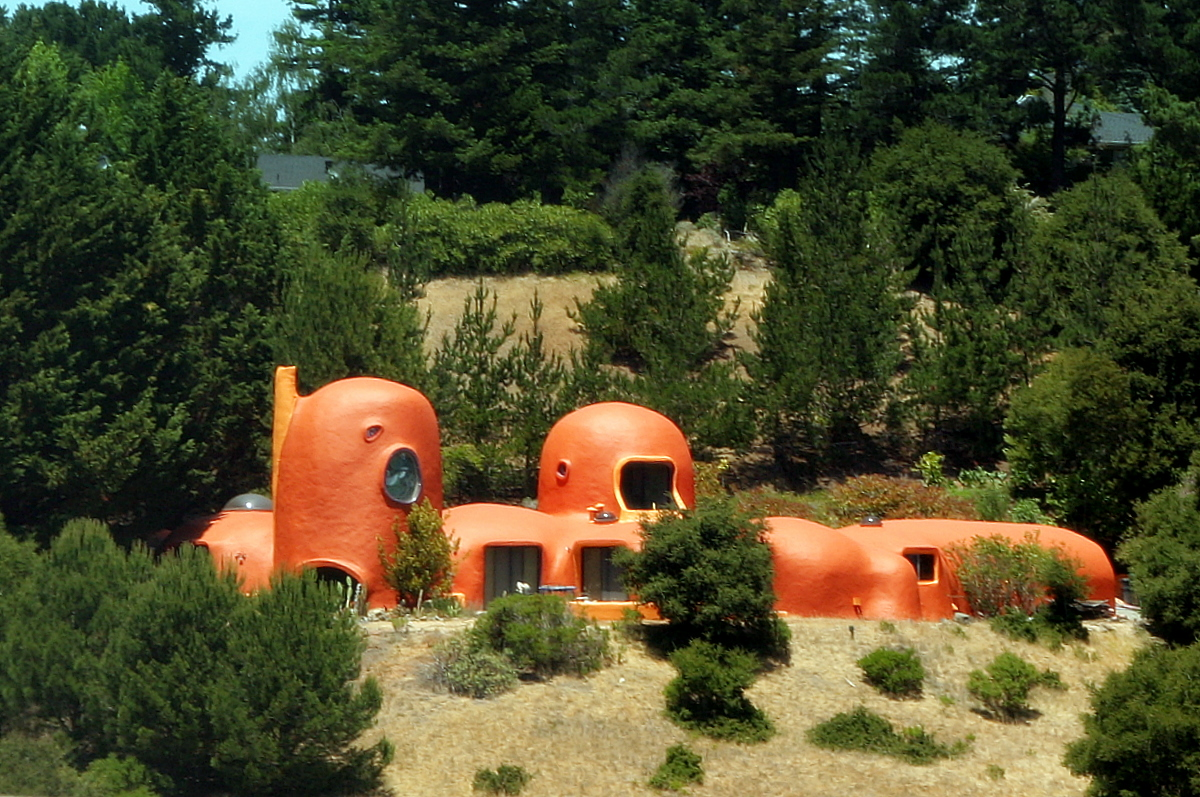
The Flintstone House from Doran Memorial Bridge, 2007

== The Flintstone House ==
Since 2017, Fang has owned The Flintstone House in Hillsborough, a wealthy town south of San Francisco, having previously lived elsewhere in Hillsborough. The house was built in 1976, and designed by the architect William Nicholson. It was listed at US$4.2 million in 2015, but Fang bought it for $2.8 million.

She added large metal dinosaurs, Flintstones figurines, and letters on the grass that spell out "Yabba-dabba-doo", saying "I see any dinosaur, I buy it." In 2019, the city of Hillsborough sued Fang for causing a public nuisance, and because her changes were largely without permits. Fang engaged lawyers and made counter-claims for violating her First Amendment rights, discrimination and emotional distress. The city's lawsuit was settled in 2021 with Fang receiving $125,000 to cover her expenses from the suit and the right to retain all modifications made, while agreeing to drop her countersuit about racial discrimination.

== Personal life ==
In 1960, she married John Ta Chuan Fang, who died in 1992. They had three sons. Their eldest son James was a BART board member for 24 years until 2015, at which point he was described as "the last Republican holding office in San Francisco." The wife of James is Daphne Huang, the daughter of former Chinese Vice Premier Huang Ju. As of 2000, their second son Ted was publisher of the San Francisco Independent, and their youngest son, Douglas, earned a doctorate in computer science. James Fang died in 2020 due to natural causes. Douglas Fang died from stomach cancer in 2003. Ted Fang died in 2024 of natural causes.
