= Chung Sai Yat Po =

Chinese-language newspaper in San Francisco, California

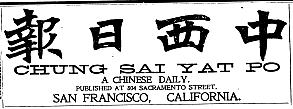
- Type: Daily newspaper
- Editor-in-chief: Ng Poon Chew
- Editor: Ng Poon Chew
- Staff writers: Teng I-yun, John Fryer
- Founded: 1900
- Ceased publication: 1951
- Language: Chinese
- Headquarters: San Francisco, California

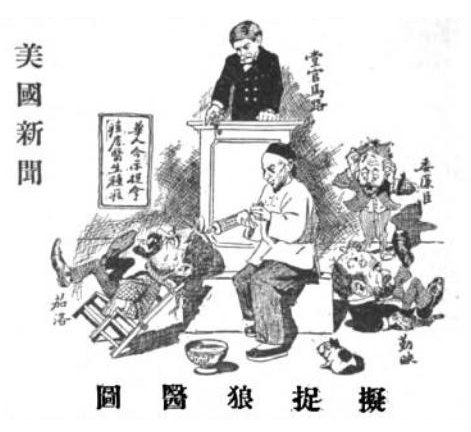
Political cartoon showing Joseph Kinyoun being injected in the head with plague vaccine, delivered by a Chinese man at the order of a judge. Kinyoun was reviled by business and political leaders of San Francisco for his work to uncover the 1900 plague epidemic. Chinese residents felt unfairly singled out for quarantine and vaccine. Published in Chung Sai Yat Po, 1900.

Chung Sai Yat Po (Chinese: 中西日報; Jyutping: zung1 sai1 jat6 bou3; pinyin: Zhōng Xi Rìbào), also known as China West Daily and Zhong Sai Yat Bo, was a Chinese-language newspaper founded by Ng Poon Chew (伍盤照) and published in San Francisco, California from 1900 to 1951. It was a major Chinese-language daily newspaper in San Francisco and helped to shape the Chinese community in San Francisco's Chinatown. The paper helped the Chinese to “break through their social and cultural isolation” to become Americans and reduced the gap between the Chinese community and mainstream American society. It was a financially independent and non-party-affiliated newspaper that cultivated discussions on community economic and social development. Chung Sai Yat Po was one of the longest running and most popular Chinese-language daily newspapers in the United States.

== Beginnings ==
In 1899, Ng Poon Chew (March 14, 1866 - March 13, 1931), a well-known and respected Chinese Presbyterian minister, started Hua Mei Sun Po (華美新報), also known as The Chinese American Newspaper, a Chinese-language weekly newspaper in Los Angeles. He moved the paper to San Francisco in 1900 and renamed it Chung Sai Yat Po. The paper then shifted from a weekly publication to a daily publication. Ng regarded Chung Sai Yat Po as a paper of integrity and acceptance in an era of yellow journalism, rife with racism. He advocated the reformation and modernization of Chinese cultural practices and the adaptation to American mainstream society. He worked as the managing editor and translated English articles into Chinese, while Teng I-yun and John Fryer, a Chinese literature professor at the University of California at Berkeley, also served on the editorial staff. Ng's Christian faith and understanding of North American identity helped to shape the values of the paper and its non-partisan stance.

== News and Features ==
Chung Sai Yat Po was one of the few Chinese-language daily papers in the United States in the early 1900s. It played a “leading role in shaping the thinking of the Chinese community” in San Francisco, as there were few accessible sources of Chinese-language news. The paper had a China news section which provided information not found in English-language newspapers. News pieces came from correspondents stationed in China and were selected specifically to the interest of Chinese immigrants. It covered news of wars, natural disasters, political developments, and educational and economic progress in China. Chung Sai Yat Po also covered American news that had a direct bearing on Chinese immigrants. These news reports kept the community updated on American legal and political issues concerning the Chinese. It reported on federal, state, and city laws and regulations, such as restrictions on importing and changes to immigration laws. Chung Sai Yat Po also frequently utilized the Associated Press and United Press for national and international news.

The paper heavily encouraged assimilation in the Chinese community. Front-page editorials often emphasized the historical and cultural significance of United States national holidays. During World War I, Chung Sai Yat Po encouraged its readers to aid in the war effort by purchasing Liberty Bonds and supporting military conscription. By being active and participating on the American home front, the Chinese community could demonstrate their citizenship. Aside from editorials and articles, the paper also featured advice columns, poetry and guest-written pieces.

Chung Sai Yat Po strongly advocated equal rights for Chinese Americans, including women. It published approximately 550 articles and 66 editorials on women between 1900 and 1911; 26 of which were written by Chinese women themselves. The paper used women's issues raised in China to address the status of Chinese women in America. These issues included the elimination of Chinese practices harmful to women, education for women, and women's rights. Chung Sai Yat Po reported on the harmful effects of foot binding by publishing articles written by doctors, satiric literature, and poetry. It also condemned polygamy, slavery, and arranged marriages, which the paper considered sexist. These practices were also seen as outdated and demeaning. Although Chung Sai Yat Po identified China as the guiltiest country in the world concerning the oppression of women, it also criticized the Chinese American community's practice of free marriage and divorce.

The paper held a conservative point of view on women's education. It often stated that education would improve women's ability to be housewives and mothers, and strengthen China as a nation. Nonetheless, it reported on the establishment of elementary schools for girls, as well as trade schools, medical schools, and teacher-training schools for women in China. These news reports on the increasing accessibility of schools for girls and women in China encouraged a similar development in the United States. Chung Sai Yat Po reported on schools for Chinese girls established by the Chinese Christian community and featured speeches conducted at Baptist and Presbyterian missions by female missionaries, advocating women's education in China and the United States. It also covered female scholastic achievements in American colleges or professional schools and other women's rights victories. The paper's reports on women's emancipation in China led to discussions on Chinese American emancipation and women's subordinate role in America. These news pieces added to the American women's suffrage movement.

== Rivalry with Sai Gai Yat Po ==
The paper's promotion of Christian values and non-partisan political stance created a rivalry between it and Sai Gai Yat Po (世界日報), also known as Chinese World Daily (1909 – 1969). It was another major Chinese-language newspaper in the United States, which followed Confucianism and supported revolutionary forces in China. While Chung Sai Yat Po argued for religious freedom and encouraged Christianity in China, Sai Gai Yat Po reinforced Confucian values. The two papers competed for readership as well as credibility and reputation in San Francisco's Chinatown. Each paper often created debates by criticizing the other paper's religious or political stance.

== 1906 San Francisco Earthquake ==
On April 18, 1906, at 5:13 am, San Francisco was hit by an earthquake. Twenty aftershocks continued to shake the city throughout the day. Chinatown was severely hit by the tremors. Buildings collapsed and a fire spread across the area, leaving Chinatown—and the heart of San Francisco—in ruins. Several newspaper plants and buildings were destroyed in the fire, including Chung Sai Yat Po’s. San Francisco's newspapers were temporarily moved to Oakland, where Chung Sai Yat Po published its first post-earthquake, hand-copied issue on April 26. It stayed and operated in Oakland until 1907.

Chung Sai Yat Po reported on the displacement of the Chinese after the earthquake. Many had nowhere to go as their homes in Chinatown were destroyed by the earthquake or the subsequent fire. The Chinese were neglected; although there were Chinese camps, resentment among white property owners forced the camps to relocate frequently. The paper also reported on the efforts of the National Red Cross, American government, and Chinese delegation, sent by the Empress Dowager. The paper helped lead the community in reclaiming Chinatown successfully. Chinatown had to be rebuilt, but there was discussion over whether it would be located on the original site or relocated to Hunters Point or Potrero, sites that many white property owners supported. Ng Poon Chew utilized the paper and his editorials to advise and guide the Chinese community through the crisis. Chung Sai Yat Po reminded Chinese immigrants of their entitlement to American constitutional rights, asked them to quietly negotiate rent with their landlords, and advised them on matters concerning insurance. As citizens and residents, they had a right to freely choose where they wanted to live.

Mayor Eugene Schmitz created a committee in charge of the relocation of the Chinese and appointed Abraham Ruef and James Phelan. Chung Sai Yat Po reported on the meetings between the committee and Chinese representatives. With the aid of a large donation from the Chinese government and the support of property owners, Chinatown was rebuilt on its original site. Chung Sai Yat Po advised Chinese shop merchants to return to Chinatown to rebuild their businesses and advocated for improvements in appearance and quality of life in Chinatown. It encouraged assimilation into American culture through abandoning “outdated and undesirable [Chinese] customs” such as worshipping wooden idols, gambling, smoking opium, sporting queues, and binding women's feet.

== The Chinese Revolution of 1911 ==
In 1904, Sun Yat-Sen was detained in San Francisco for attempting to enter the United States on a forged passport. He contacted Ng Poon Chew, a fellow Christian. Ng connected him with the Zhigongdang, who hired an attorney and raised bail funds for Sun's release. Because of his meeting with Sun, after the Wuchang Uprising on October 10, 1911, Ng and Chung Sai Yat Po began to shift from a pro-reform stance to supporting the republican revolution. The existing Qing government’s reforms were being challenged by the Tongmenghui, led by Sun Yat-sen. The paper asked its readers to give their support to Sun and the emerging government, as it “represented democracy and happiness for all Chinese.” It believed that the establishment of the Republic of China provided an opportunity to promote and develop Christianity in China. Chung Sai Yat Po also supported laissez-faire capitalism in China, trade with the United States, and a modern educational system.

In March 1912, Chung Sai Yat Po’s political stance shifted again. When Yuan Shikai was appointed President of the Republic of China, for his role in convincing the Qing government to abdicate, Sun Yat-sen stepped down from his elected position as provisional president. Sun established the Kuomintang with Song Jiaoren, shortly afterwards and began an anti-Yuan, Second Revolution in July 1913. Chung Sai Yat Po viewed Sun's challenges to Yuan as rebellious and considered Yuan's government to be legitimate. It believed Sun to be an idealist, while Yuan was seen as a more practical leader for China. However, when Yuan attempted to restore a monarchical system and declared himself Emperor of China, Chung Sai Yat Po repealed its support. It expressed strong opposition to the restoration and voiced its own inclination to republicanism. The paper continued this pro-republican stance during the rule of the succeeding Beiyang government and Kuomintang government.

Until 1915, the offices and printing shop of Chung Sai Yat Po were located in San Francisco's Chinatown at 809 Sacramento Street, a building that would later house the headquarters of Chinese Nationalist Daily/Chinese Daily Post (Kuo Min Yat Po) and of AsianWeek, and in 2015 became the WWII Pacific War Memorial Hall museum.

== See also ==
- Media in the San Francisco Bay Area
- History of Chinese Americans
- Xinhai Revolution
- 1906 San Francisco earthquake
