= Doran Memorial Bridge =

Twin bridges in San Mateo County, California, U.S.

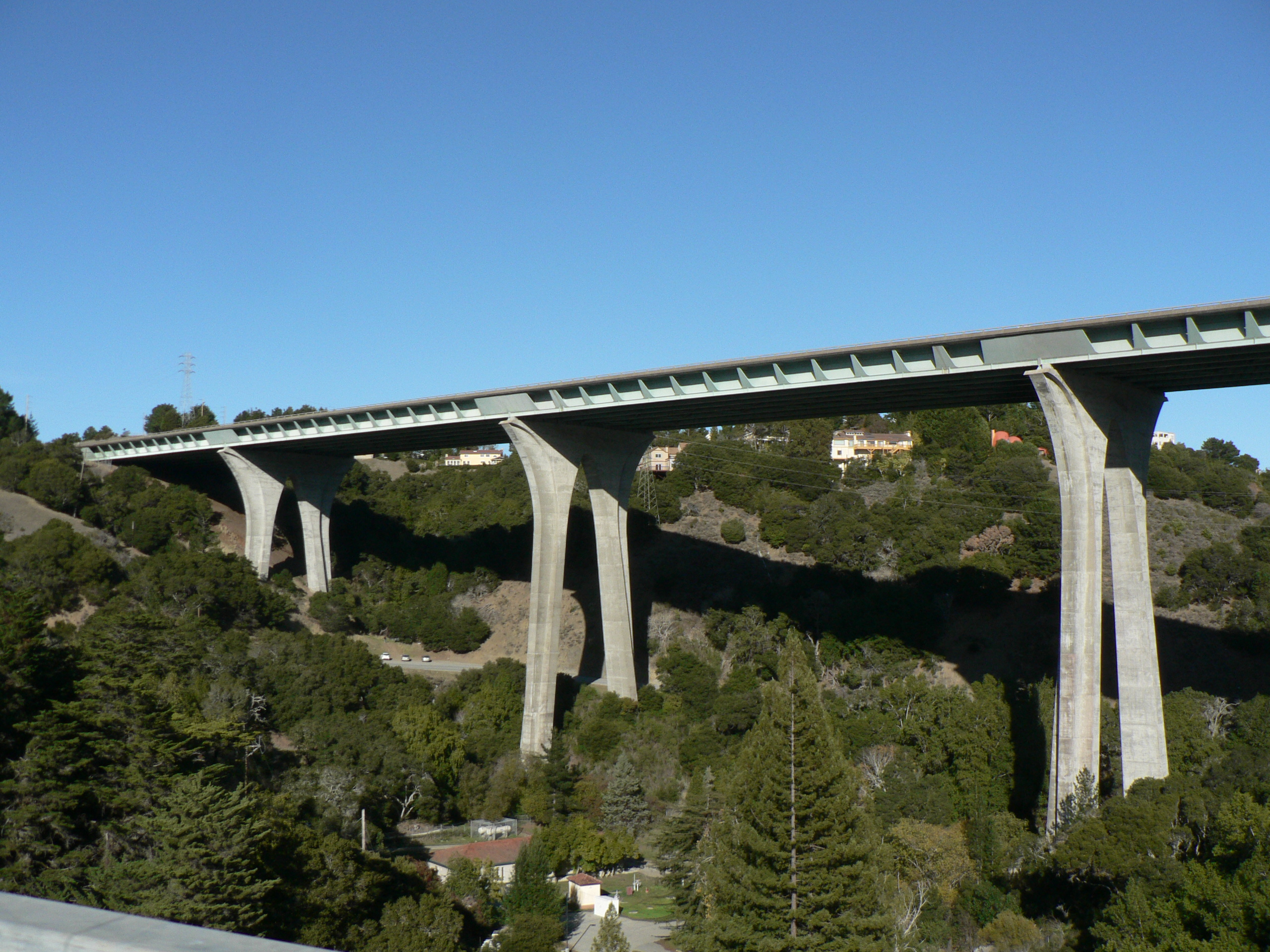
- Doran Memorial Bridge
- Coordinates: 37.530253°N 122.360639°W
- Carries: I-280
- Crosses: San Mateo Creek
- Official name: Officer Eugene A. Doran and Marine Lance Corporal Patrick M. Doran Memorial Bridge
- Other name: San Mateo Creek Bridge
- Named for: Eugene A. Doran and Patrick M. Doran
- Owner: Caltrans
- ID number: 35 0199

Characteristics
- Design: Steel girder
- Clearance below: 250 ft (76 m)

History
- Architect: Mario J. Ciampi
- Designer: California Division of Highways
- Constructed by: Dan Caputo Corporation
- Fabrication by: Kaiser Steel
- Construction end: 1967
- Opened: May 28, 1969; 56 years ago

Location
- Interactive map of Doran Memorial Bridge

The Doran Memorial Bridge is the twin pair of steel girder bridges that carry eight lanes of road traffic on Interstate 280 over San Mateo Creek near Hillsborough, California in San Mateo County.

== History ==
The Doran Memorial Bridge was originally known as the San Mateo Creek Bridge according to Caltrans plans. It was named the Eugene A. Doran Memorial Bridge in 1969, after the Hillsborough police officer who was killed near the site on August 5, 1959; Doran's widow attended the ribbon-cutting ceremony on May 28, 1969. In 2004, the bridge was rededicated as the Officer Eugene A. Doran and Marine Lance Corporal Patrick M. Doran Memorial Bridge to include his son, Patrick, who died in Vietnam on February 18, 1967 while serving in the United States Marine Corps.

Prior to the opening ceremony on May 28, 1969, a "Pedestrian Day" was held on May 25, with more than 30,000 crossing the new span on foot.

It won the Medium Span, High Clearance category in the 1970 AISC steel bridges contest. Markers commemorating Eugene A. Doran and the AISC award are at the Crystal Springs Safety Roadside Rest Area off northbound I-280, approximately 1/2 mile (0.80 km) north of the bridge itself. The Doran Memorial Bridge was featured on the cover of the 1972 Highway Statistics report published by the Federal Highway Administration with other recently completed major structures, including the Verrazzano–Narrows Bridge, the Chesapeake Bay Bridge-Tunnel, and the Cowlitz River Bridge.

== Design and construction ==
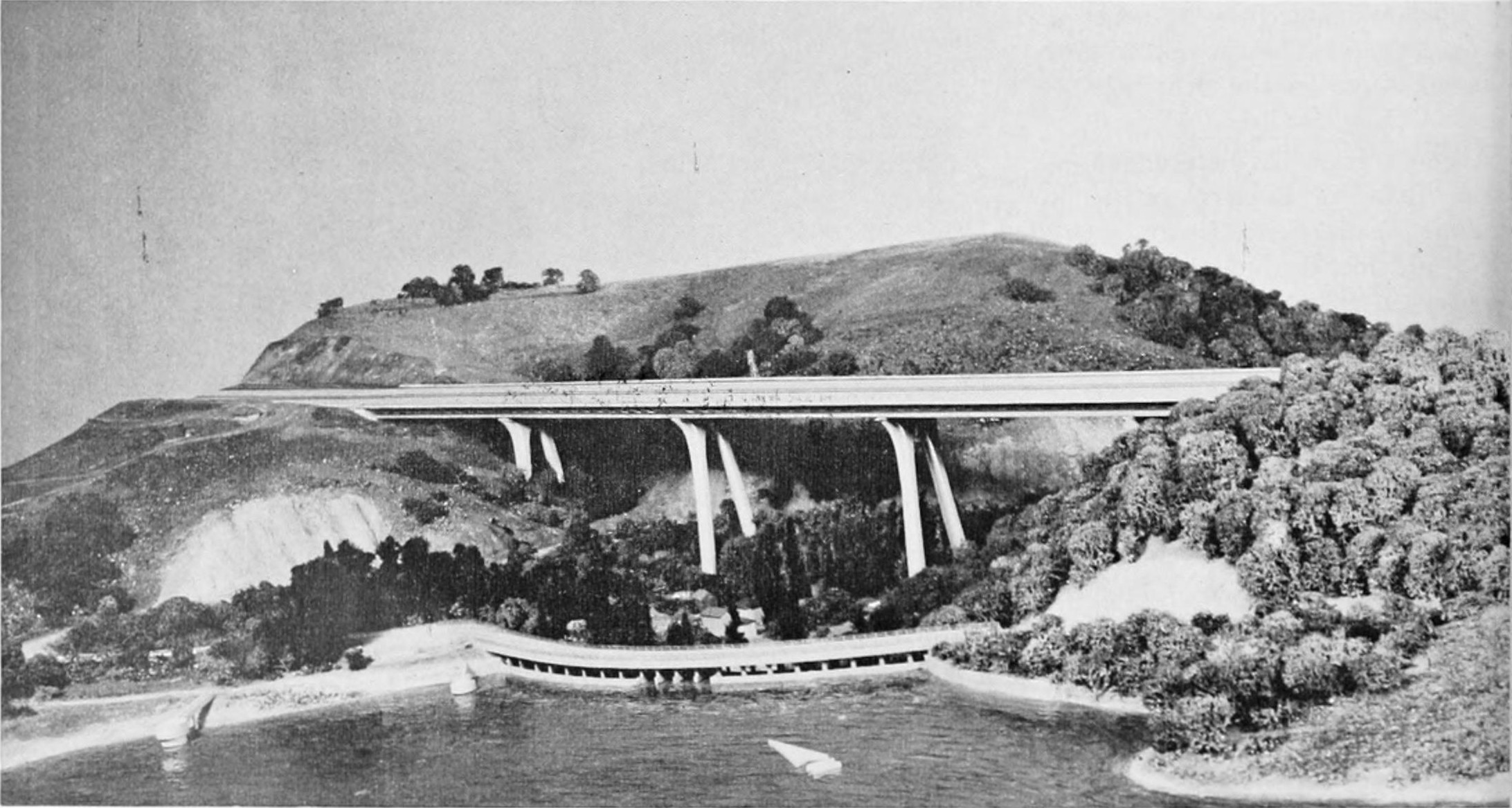
1964 bridge model with Crystal Springs Dam

The bridge was designed by Caltrans architect Warren S. Ludlow, engineers Robert Cassano and Delmar Janson, with assistance from Mario J. Ciampi. Ciampi was commissioned to design freeway structures for I-280 by the Division of Highways in 1963.

Four arched concrete piers support the twin girder bridges. They use modified Gothic arches; the finish was left in the natural concrete color, and the surfaces were contoured to help them blend into their surroundings. The twin bridges contain five parallel welded steel girders and are connected by a 22-foot (6.7 m) wide concrete slab. The structural steel is concealed by a slanted panel on either side. Bids were opened on April 7, 1965, for the stretch of freeway including the San Mateo Creek Bridge. To minimize impact on the gorge below, materials were lowered from a "high line" built between towers on the adjoining cliffs. It is next to the 1888 Crystal Springs Dam, which was (at the time of its completion) the largest concrete structure in the world. Construction of the first pier began in January 1966.

== See also ==
- The Flintstone House
