= San Francisco Department of Public Health =

US city and county health dsepartment

Agency overview
- Jurisdiction: City and County of San Francisco
- Headquarters: 1145 Market Street, 11th Floor, San Francisco, CA 94103
- Employees: About 8,000
- Annual budget: $2.4 billion
- Agency executive: Daniel Tsai, Director of Public Health
- Website: www.sf.gov/departments/department-public-health

The San Francisco Department of Public Health (SFDPH), previously called as the San Francisco Health Department, is the public health department of the city of San Francisco, California in the US. It has two main divisions: The San Francisco Health Network and Population Health.

== History ==
In 1899, there was an outbreak of Bubonic Plague in San Francisco's Chinatown. During this time, it was discovered that there had been cases of the plague in Hong Kong, China. Chinese people were forbidden from entering the U.S. and fear affected citizens of San Francisco. The San Francisco Health Department closed Chinese businesses and subsequently burned parts of Chinatown. The inhabitants of Chinatown were required to receive vaccinations if they planned on relocating from the city. A citizen, named Wong Wai, sued the department; the ruling was in favor of Wai and requested that the department should terminate their behavior. Health officials, dissatisfied with the ruling, ostracized and isolated Chinatown and all its inhabitants, because of their fears of the plague spreading.

The plague scare raised awareness for public health intervention. San Francisco's health officials, including San Francisco Mayor Eugene Schmitz, California Governor George Pardee, and his personal health officials, created a partnership between themselves and the sanitary campaign in Chinatown. Through this partnership, health officials all around the state would be notified if the causes of death were suspicious or had suspicion of the plague. This was in efforts to address and better serve the public's interests in health and sanitation during the time of the plague. In addition, any obtained tissues from suspicious causes of death would directly be sent to the Public Health Service Laboratory in San Francisco to help identify and eradicate the infection.

== Subdivisions ==
San Francisco Department of Public Health
1 SF General
2 Laguna Honda
3 Castro-Mission
4 Chinatown
5 Curry Senior & Tom Waddell
6 Maxine Hall
7 Ocean Park
8 Potrero Hill (Caleb King)
9 Silver Avenue
10 Southeast

=== Population Health Division ===
The Division is composed of various branches dedicated to core public health services for the City and County of San Francisco, such as health protection and promotion, disease and injury prevention, disaster preparedness and response, and environmental health services.

=== San Francisco Health Network ===
The San Francisco Health Network consists of the San Francisco General Hospital, Laguna Honda Hospital and many other clinics throughout San Francisco. The San Francisco Health Network has stated they will perform duties irrespective of immigration status or the lack of health insurance. The network aims to implement and increase innovative strategies.

=== Zuckerberg San Francisco General Hospital ===
The Priscilla Chan and Mark Zuckerberg San Francisco General Hospital and Trauma Center (ZFGH) (also called "The General") is the sole provider of trauma and psychiatric emergency services for the City and County of San Francisco. A comprehensive medical center, ZSFG serves approximately 100,000 patients per year and provides 20 percent of the city’s inpatient care. In 2011, ZSFG became the first hospital in the country to be certified for a Traumatic Brain Injury program. As San Francisco’s public hospital, ZSFG is a member of the San Francisco Health Network, an integrated delivery system operated by the Department of Public Health that provides all levels of care to San Franciscans.

== Needle exchange ==
In fulfilling the San Francisco Department of Public Health's mission to promote the health of its citizens, it practices a harm reduction model, including needle exchange, which is proven to reduce the spread of viral infections like HIV, hepatitis B and hepatitis C.

Since 2013, SFPDH's has made additional efforts to improve needle disposal through its coordination and funding of several collaborative and community-based programs:

- As of September 12, 2018, there are currently sixteen 24 hour syringe disposal sites located within San Francisco, seven of which are kiosks and the other nine being small disposal boxes. In collaboration with the SF AIDS Foundation, SFDPH funds a ten-member clean up team that operates 12 hours a day, 7 days a week to pick up used syringes and needles off the streets, in addition to collaborating with Homeless Youth Alliance, St. James Infirmary, San Francisco Drug User's Union, and Glide Harm Reduction Services in an effort to maximize its proper needle cleanup services.
- Among injection-drug users in San Francisco, SFPDH's syringe access and distribution programs like San Francisco Health Information Viability are in charge of providing fresh injection and safer sex materials, referrals for medical treatment, and opportunities for HIV and hepatitis C testing. Reduced HIV and hepatitis C transmission among IDUs and their partners is the program's main objective.

San Francisco Public Works provides maintenance for the streets and groundwork of San Francisco:

- Provision of different street cleaning services, specialized by district and by street direction. San Francisco bi-weekly street cleaning schedule is available at San Francisco Public Works website.
- Beginning 2014, SF Public Works placed a number of Pit Stops in various impacted locations around San Francisco. Pit Stops provide access to universal toilets, needle disposal, and dog waste stations. Currently, there are 24 pit stops available in 12 neighborhoods throughout the city. All the pit stops are staffed by paid workers to ensure their cleanliness throughout the day.
- 311 service is available for the residents or the visitors of San Francisco to report illegal dumping on the street or sidewalk, graffiti vandalism, fallen trees, human waste, or potholes on the streets. This service can be accessed via calling 311, mobile app 311, or visiting sf311 online. The city officials respond within 48 hours or devise a plan if a request requires more time.

== Community Health Equity & Promotion (CHEP) ==
This branch of SFDPH is part of the Quality Improvement branch that hosts multiple programs and initiatives to promote active-living, healthy eating, and decreasing the spread of STIs, such as HIV. Many of these quality improvement projects are on-going and long-term studies that achieve success through results-based accountability.
