= Laguna Honda Hospital =

Nonprofit hospital in San Francisco California

Laguna Honda Hospital and Rehabilitation Center
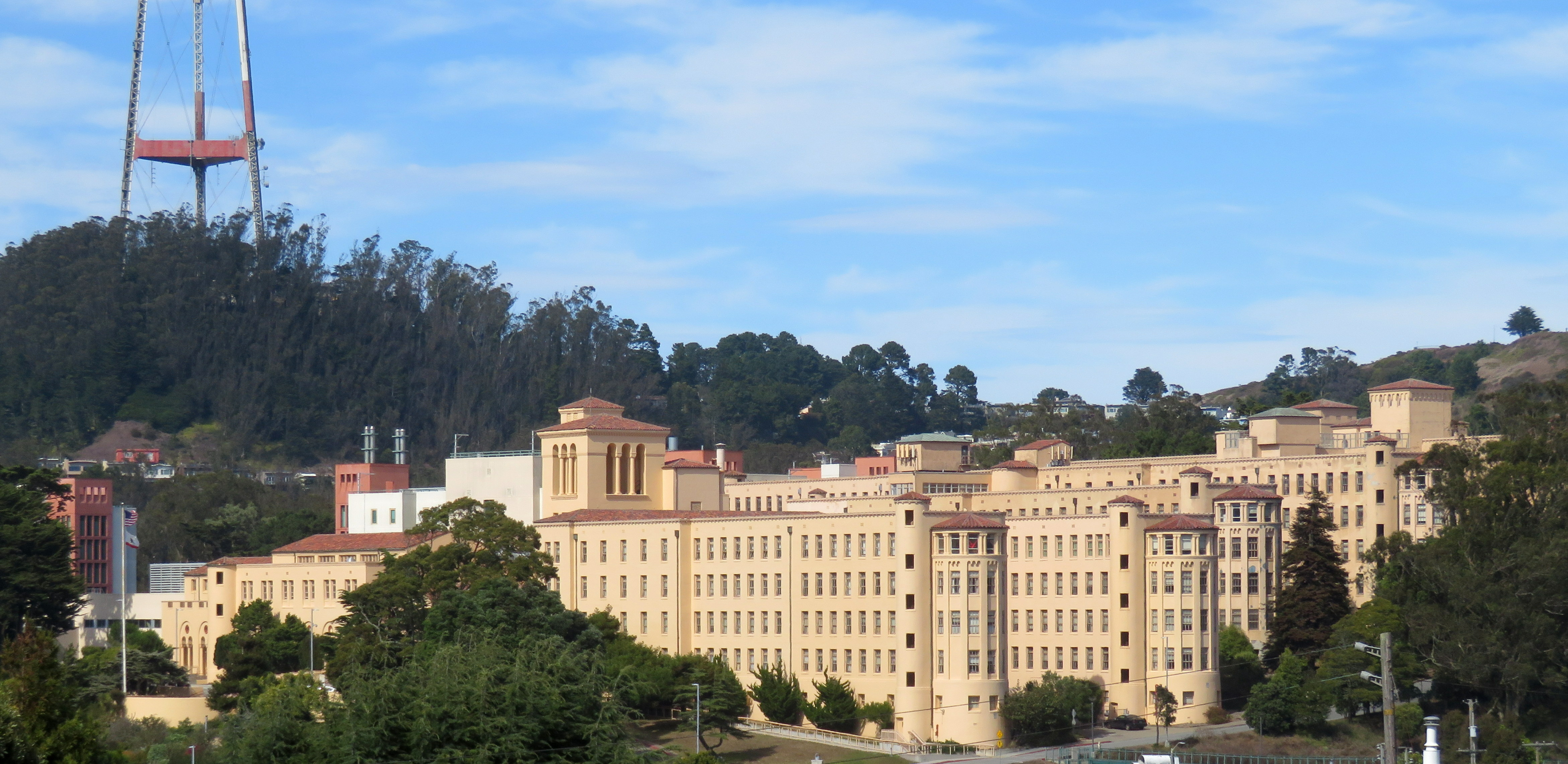

Geography
- Coordinates: 37°44′57″N 122°27′25″W

Organisation
- Care system: Medi-Cal

History
- Opened: 1866

Laguna Honda Hospital and Rehabilitation Center is a nonprofit, publicly funded, 780 bed long-term acute care hospital in San Francisco, California, United States. It was founded in 1866 during the California Gold Rush as an almshouse, and later grew into an asylum, then an accredited hospital in 1963. It has been described as America's "last big almshouse".

== History ==
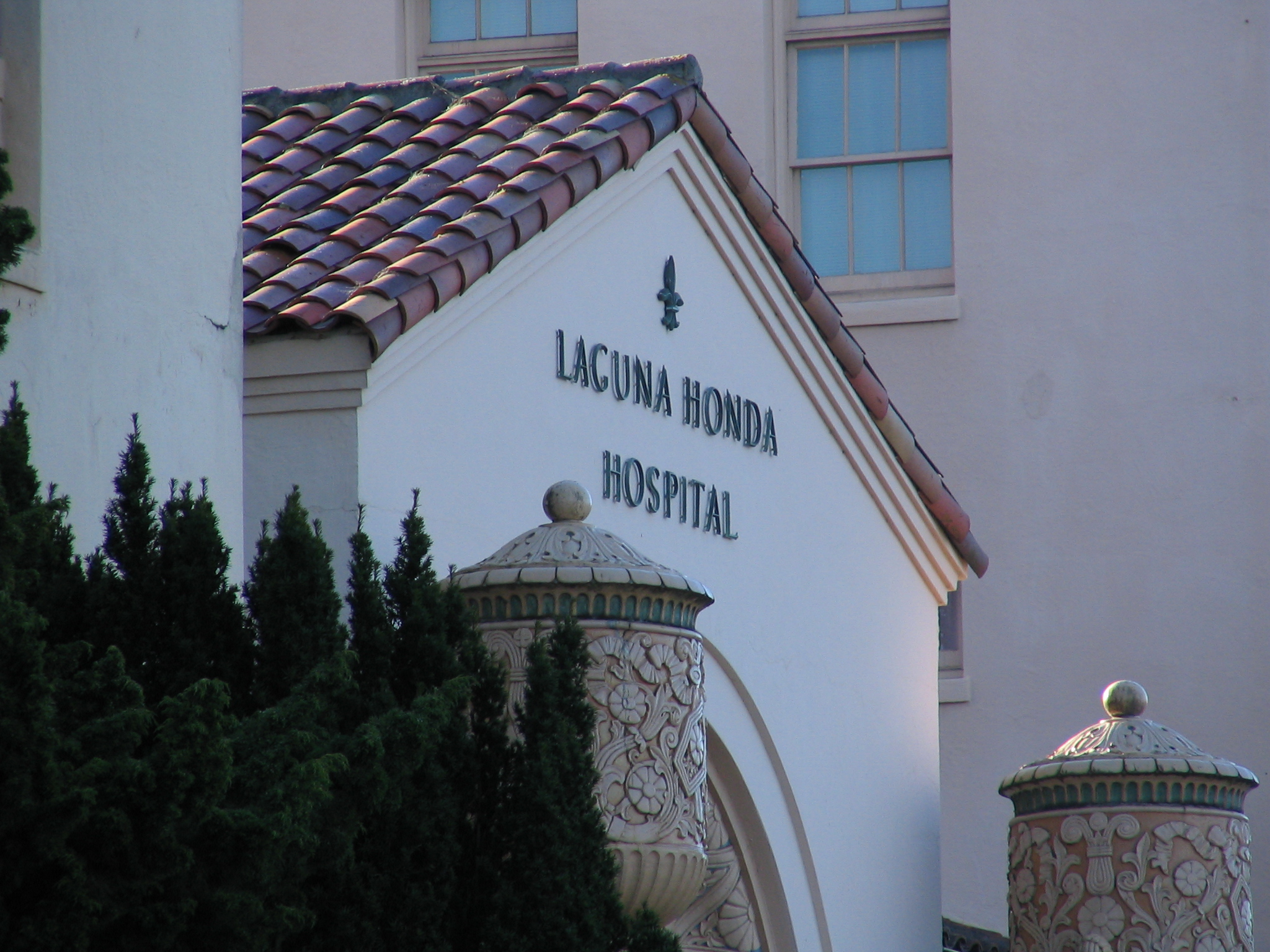
The main entrance

Laguna Honda was an early homeless shelter or almshouse, a place to house the poor, sick, and disabled, starting in 1867, in the wake of the California Gold Rush. On 87 acres of land, residents were self-sufficient, growing food and tending dairy cows. In 1868, due to an outbreak of smallpox, a small hospital was constructed, which was later used as a mental asylum, but the primary focus remained on sheltering the destitute. The population increased to 500 by 1870.

With the 1906 San Francisco earthquake destroying much of the housing in the city, the need for services provided by Laguna Honda became more acute, and three years later a new wing of 1,000 beds was dedicated by President Theodore Roosevelt. In 1910, Clarendon Hall was opened as the first permanent building intended for long-term care. The main hospital buildings were opened in 1926, built in the Spanish Revival style. In the 1930s, the hospital continued to grow as it started to serve as a teaching center for the University of California and started performing surgery and taking x-rays. The Friends of Laguna Honda Hospital are a group that has supported Laguna Honda since the 1950s against threats of loss of funding and closure, as well as volunteering to support the hospital and providing amenities for its residents. Laguna Honda received hospital accreditation in 1963, and renovated the main buildings in the 1970s.

Laguna Honda is non-profit and publicly funded. Dedicated to the care of "the very poor, the very sick and the very disabled", it has been described as America's "last big almshouse".

== Conditions in recent years ==
In the late 1990s, Laguna Honda was troubled by threats of closure due to mismanagement, overcrowding, and "egregious conditions" according to federal investigators. City attorney Louise Renne secured settlements for the city from tobacco industry consumer protection lawsuits, and a ballot measure had $141 million of that put towards rebuilding and modernizing Laguna Honda, replacing Clarendon Hall with a new facility.

Issues arose again in 2019, when the San Francisco Department of Public Health found years of abuse by six hospital employees of the residents, which led to police investigation and later reforms to procedures and reporting. In 2021, the hospital reported non-fatal overdoses that led the state to begin an audit, which concluded in October that the hospital was no longer in compliance with those requirements, and was given six months to remedy the situation. In March 2022, federal funding from Medicare and Medicaid was also put in jeopardy when regulators found drug paraphernalia, smoking, and, of the most concern, a patient possessing a lighter while also being on supplemental oxygen, a severe fire risk. The hospital remedied that designation within a week by restricting visitors and searching possessions. However, the next month, federal funding, which was two thirds of the hospital's budget, was cut after new deficiencies were found relating to hygiene, documentation, and prevention of infection. Patients were ordered to be transferred out of Laguna Honda, but with very few options, only 57 patients were found a spot at another hospital, 41 of them were actually moved, of which 12 died soon after.

The city sued the federal government, and in October, a settlement was reached, extending funding temporarily until November 2023 and putting a pause to the transferring of patients out of Laguna Honda. The federal government approved a detailed "action plan" in January 2023, with visits every 90 days to verify progress. In August 2023, Laguna Honda applied for readmission into Medi-Cal, which more than 95% of its residents rely upon, based on its completion of its planned comprehensive improvements, and funding was restored five days later. In June 2024, the facility was reapproved to receive federal Medicare, and residents that were moved to other hospitals were invited back as first priority, with the first eleven returning in August 2024. Laguna Honda achieved a five-star quality rating from federal Medicaid regulators in April 2025, after the completion of years of comprehensive reforms and nearly a thousand distinct steps of improvement from the facility's two-star rating in 2022 when it originally lost its funding.
