= Menlo-Atherton High School =

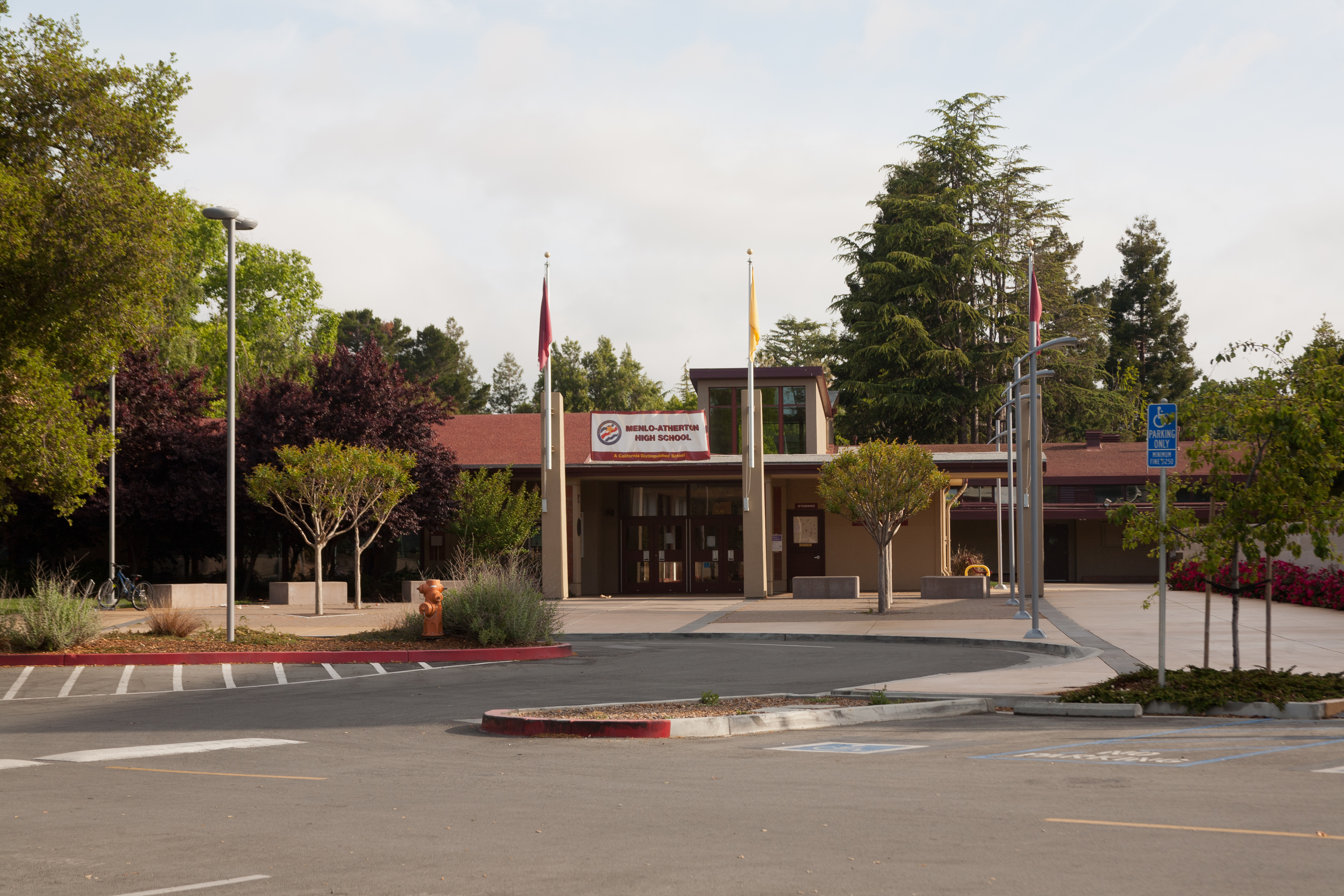
- Menlo-Atherton High School in 2011

Location
- 555 Middlefield Road; Atherton, California 94027; United States; 37°27′40″N 122°10′30″W

Information
- Type: public comprehensive
- Motto: Strength in Diversity
- Established: 1951
- School district: Sequoia Union High School District
- Principal: Karl Losekoot
- Teaching staff: 123.67 (FTE)
- Grades: 9–12
- Enrollment: 2,152 (2023–2024)
- Student to teacher ratio: 17.40
- Colors: Maroon; Gold
- Nickname: Bears
- Publication: M-A Chronicle, The Mark
- Feeder schools: Hillview Middle School, La Entrada Middle School, Cesar Chavez Ravenswood Middle School
- Website: www.mabears.org

Menlo-Atherton High School (known as M-A to locals) is a four-year public high school secondary school located in Atherton, California. Menlo-Atherton is part of the Sequoia Union High School District.

Menlo-Atherton has been named one of the top secondary schools in the nation by the United States Department of Education as part of its National School Recognition Program. It was selected as a California Distinguished School by the California Department of Education in 2007 and 2013. In 2005, Newsweek ranked the school as the 259th best school in the United States. Menlo-Atherton also offers the most Advanced Placement courses in the district with 24, ranging from Studio Art to US History.

Since the closure of Ravenswood High School, Menlo-Atherton has been racially diverse, drawing from Atherton, Menlo Park, Redwood City, East Palo Alto, and Portola Valley. The school's motto is "Strength in Diversity".

== Academics ==
Typically, 97% of graduates continue their education. 37% opt for two-year colleges, 60% go to four-year colleges.

M-A offers the following Advanced Placement courses: Art History; Biology; Calculus AB/BC; Chinese Language; Chemistry; Computer Science A; Computer Science Principles; English Language/Composition; English Literature; Environmental Science; French Language; Latin; Physics; Psychology; Spanish Language; Spanish Literature (approximately every other year); Statistics; Studio Art; and US History. M-A has an 77% pass rate on AP exams, with 41% scoring a 5. It also has the Advanced Via Individual Determination program and the Computer Academy, programs for students seeking a smaller, supportive learning environment.

GPA Distribution for the Class of 2023
| GPA Range | Number of Students | Percent |
|---|---|---|
| 4.2 and above | 76 | 15% |
| 3.8-4.19 | 106 | 22% |
| 3.4-3.79 | 80 | 16% |
| 3.0-3.39 | 60 | 12% |
| 2.6-2.99 | 48 | 10% |
| 2.2-2.59 | 63 | 13% |
| 2.0-2.19 | 17 | 3% |
| Below 2.0 | 42 | 9% |

== Athletics ==
Menlo-Atherton has nearly 60 teams at the varsity, junior varsity and freshman levels in 15 sports that they offer. Over 46% of the student body participates in a sport with 1,100 athletes in the 2018–19 season. M-A has emerged as one of the most accomplished athletic programs in Northern California, winning 2 CIF State titles (Football & Girls Wrestling-individual title), 8 Central Coast Section titles, and 13 Peninsula Athletic League titles in the 2018–19 school year. The Bears have also won the PAL Commissioner's Cup the last 11 years in a row and in 12 of the 13 years of its existence. The Commissioner's Cup is awarded annually to the Peninsula Athletic League school that best exemplifies the league's commitment to sportsmanship and excellence in athletics. Points are awarded to each varsity team in each sport that they participate in, by the order of finish in league play and for sportsmanship.

In 2017, Co-Athletic Directors Paul Snow and Steven Kryger were named NorCal Athletic Directors of the Year by the California Coaches Association. That same year saw Adhir Ravipati named the NorCal Football Coach of the Year, and in 2018, Jane Worden and Brett Koerten were named State Swim Coaches of the Year, also by the California Coaches Association. In 2017, Menlo-Atherton was named the Northern California Public High School of the Year by Prep2Prep.com for their athletic achievements.

In the 2024 NFL Draft, Menlo-Atherton 2021 alum Troy Franklin was selected as a fourth-round pick and 102nd overall for the Denver Broncos.

== Fine arts ==
Menlo-Atherton is home to a professional-level 492-seat theater, the Menlo-Atherton Center for Performing Arts. It is home to the school play and musical; band, orchestra, guitar, and choir concerts; the Menlo-Atherton Student Film Festival; the Bear Arts Expo, a collaboration between all of M-A's arts classes; and many other school events. It also hosts events related to the City of Menlo Park, which partially financed its construction, and is a regular venue of ensembles and music festivals including the Philharmonia Baroque Orchestra and Music@Menlo.

The Advanced Jazz Ensemble regularly travels to festivals around the world, including the annual Reno Jazz Festival and the Montreux Jazz Festival. The band is supported by the Band Boosters.

The center is home to M-A Drama, Menlo-Atherton's chapter of the International Thespian Society. M-A Drama produces a play and a musical each year. M-A Drama is supported by M-A Drama Boosters.

== Controversy ==
In November 2022, two separate students brought guns to school. The first incident was on November 10, when M-A staff called Atherton Police after receiving an anonymous tip that identified a student as possessing a gun. School staff conducted an administrative search of the student and located a SIG Sauer P226 9mm pistol with one round chambered and nine rounds in the magazine in the student's waistband. M-A staff decided not to inform students or parents until after the school day. On November 29, Atherton Police arrested a student for bringing a loaded Smith & Wesson M&P Shield .380 pistol to school after staff reported there was a firearm in an unattended backpack. After this incident, Principal Karl Losekoot alerted parents the next day but not students until two days after.

In November 2023, Chloe Gentile-Montgomery and another teacher taught a lesson on dominate and counter-narratives that included discussion of the Israel-Palestine conflict. One slide included a video from Turkish Radio and Television Corporation, which is a Turkish propaganda group and another slide claimed the United Nations says that Israel is illegal. The slide presentation prompted backlash from community members, leading to a Sequoia Union High School District Board of Trustee meeting to divulge into a verbal altercation and the police being called. After the slide presentation became public and the Board Meeting, the Deborah Project and Zachor Legal Institute sent California Public Records Act requests for all lesson materials from all classes about Israel, Palestine, or Zionism, along with all Ethnic Studies materials and electronic communications about Ethnic Studies.

== Alumni ==
- Rhett Ayers Butler, Journalist and Author
- Rebecca Bauer-Kahan, California State Legislator
- Andre Benz, music executive and entrepreneur
- Mekhi Blackmon, NFL Cornerback, Minnesota Vikings, 2017
- Chuck Bradley, American football player
- Will Brill, Tony award-winning performer
- Greg Buckingham, Olympic Silver Medalist in swimming, Mexico City 1968; brother of Lindsey
- Lindsey Buckingham, singer and guitarist with rock group Fleetwood Mac, 1967
- Cheryl Burke, Professional dancer on Dancing with the Stars
- Greg Camarillo (born 1982), NFL wide receiver (Minnesota Vikings)
- Marcus Chait, actor and producer, 1991
- Chris Dorst, Olympic silver medalist in water polo, Los Angeles 1984
- Marshall "Mark" Drummond, academic administrator
- Bevan Dufty, San Francisco Bay Area politician and bureaucrat
- Shelby Fero, actor, writer and comedian.
- Francesca Fiorentini, journalist
- Troy Franklin, NFL wide receiver for the Denver Broncos, 2021
- James Gaughran, Olympic water polo athlete, Melbourne 1956
- Iszac Henig, transgender swimmer
- Scott Huffaker, racing driver
- Mark Lettieri, Grammy award-winning guitarist with Snarky Puppy
- Bob Melvin, Major League Baseball player and manager
- Jordan Mims, NFL running back for the New Orleans Saints, 2017
- Stevie Nicks, singer with rock group Fleetwood Mac, 1966
- Elizabeth Osborn, woman equestrian vaulter United States, 2008
- Ruth Porat, Alphabet and Google CFO; former Morgan Stanley CFO
- Jamila Reinhardt, current player on the USA Rugby women's national team, named in the Eagles 2017 Women's Rugby World Cup squad.
- Dick Roth, Olympic gold medalist in swimming, Tokyo 1964, Olympic and world record holder 400IM
- Courtney Thorne-Smith, actress
- Bob Weir, singer, guitarist and founding member of The Grateful Dead
- Steve Westly, venture capitalist, former California State Controller, 2006 gubernatorial candidate, and executive at eBay
- Richard L. Wright, political leader
- Jurrion Dickey, American football wide receiver

== Faculty ==
- Leo Krupnik (born 1979), Ukrainian-born American-Israeli former soccer player

== See also ==
- Sequoia Union High School District
- San Mateo County High Schools
