= Silicon Valley International School Willows Campus =

School district in California, United States

Silicon Valley International School
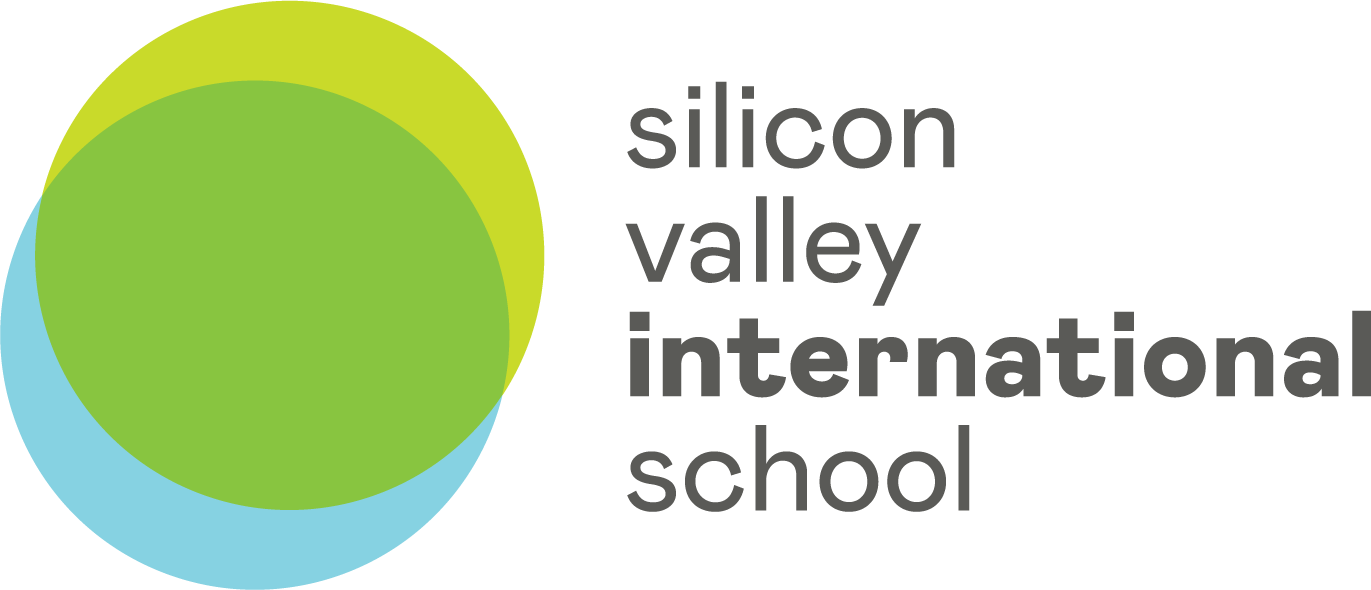

Location
- 475 Pope St; Silicon Valley; Menlo Park, San Mateo County, CA 94024; USA; 37°27′41″N 122°09′26″W

Information
- Former names: International School of the Peninsula (ISTP), Peninsula French-American School (PFAS), Alto International School (ALTO), German-American International School (GAIS)
- School type: Private Language Immersion
- Founded: 1978 (PFAS), 1988 (GAIS)
- Founder: Charlotte de Géry and Stephen Kispersky
- Status: Open
- Head of school: Barbara Greiner
- Grades: Preschool–12th Grade
- Age range: 3–18
- Enrollment: 843 (2026)
- Language: English, French, German, Mandarin Chinese
- Campus: Cohn Campus (Kindergarten–5th Grades), Clarke Campus (Additional Kindergarten), Willows Campus (Preschool–Pre-Kindergarten & 6th-12th Grades)
- Accreditations: International Baccalaureate, California Association of Independent Schools, Western Association of Schools and Colleges, French Ministry of National Education
- Website: siliconvalleyinternational.org

Silicon Valley International School, colloquially INTL, (pronounced "international"), is a private grade day school located in Silicon Valley, with two campuses in Palo Alto (formerly International School of the Peninsula, ISTP) and Menlo Park (formerly Alto International School).

Silicon Valley International School teaches in English, Mandarin Chinese, French, and German. INTL is an International Baccalaureate World School, and teaches the IB Primary Years Programme (PYP), the IB Middle Years Programme (MYP) and the IB Diploma Programme (DP).

The Willows Campus houses the INTL’s Early Years Program (Preschool and Pre-K) as well as the school’s Upper School (6th-12th) which includes the Middle Years Programme (MYP) and the Diploma Programme (DP).

In addition to its language immersion programs, INTL offers an Upper School Language Acquisition (USLA) program. USLA provides an intensive language learning environment that cultivates international leadership skills while gaining the ability to quickly become proficient in a second language (Chinese, French, German, or Spanish).

== History ==
On January 1, 2021, Silicon Valley International School (INTL) and Alto International School (Alto) legally merged, united under the same name - Silicon Valley International School (INTL). When INTL and Alto finalized their merger at the end of 2020 and start of 2021, the two campuses became one school under the banner of INTL with Alto's campus becoming INTL's Willows Campus alongside the INTL Cohn Campus.

Prior to the merger, Alto was originally founded in 1988 as the first German school on the US West Coast. Originally named the German-American International School (GAIS) it changed its name to Alto International School in September 2016.

As an International Baccalaureate (IB) World School since 2007, the school offered both the IB Middle Years Programme (MYP) from Grades 6 through Grade 10, and (Since receiving accreditation in 2018) the IB Diploma Programme (DP) from Grades 11 and 12.

== Accomplishments ==
ISTP has been in the annual San Francisco Chinese New Year Festival and Parade. The school has received awards in the Amateur Self-Built Float Category in previous years, winning either 1st or 2nd place.

Based on the International Schools' Assessment (ISA) and the PISA test of the Organization for Economic Cooperation and Development (OECD), Alto students used to consistently outperform comparable schools worldwide and in 2017 Alto's 9th Grade students had tested above the highest ranking schools systems in the world and scored in the top 10% worldwide. In addition, according to the Presidential Honor Roll of the American Association of Teachers of German, students of Alto International School ranked in 2017 and 2018 within the top 3 schools in California and within the top 10 schools nationwide.

In 2016, ISTP won Palo Alto's 4th annual Mayor's Green Business Leader Award.

In 2017, 2018, and 2019, the "Best of the Best" edition of the Bay Area Magazine, Alto International School was awarded Gold and Silver medals for the best school in the following 6 categories: Preschool, Elementary School, Middle School, High School, International School and Language Immersion Program.

In 2021, Alto and INTL merged to become Silicon Valley International School and the Menlo Park Alto campus was renamed to the INTL Willows Campus, which now houses their preschool/pre-kindergarten and upper school (6th-12th).

In 2022, "Best of the Best" by Bay Area Parent, INTL was awarded Gold medals for the Best International School, Best Preschool or Childcare Center, and Best Private High School. In addition, INTL was awarded Silver medals for Language Immersion, Best Private Middle School, and Best Technology School or Program.

In 2023, INTL once again earned a Gold medal for the Best International School in "Best of the Best" by Bay Area Parent. In addition, INTL was awarded a Gold medal for Best Private High School. INTL was awarded Silver medals for Best Private Middle School, and Best Preschool while taking home a Bronze medal for Best Language Immersion School.

== Accreditations ==
- California Association of Independent Schools (CAIS)
- Western Association of Schools and Colleges (WASC)
- French Ministry of Education
- Agency for French Teaching Abroad (AEFE)
- National Association of Independent School (NAIS)
- Independent Schools of the San Francisco Bay Area (ISSFBA)
- International Baccalaureate Organization (IBO)
