= ISTP =

ISTP may refer to:

- a Myers–Briggs Type Indicator personality type
- a Socionics personality type
- International Solar-Terrestrial Physics Science Initiative, an international research collaboration
- International School of the Peninsula, in Palo Alto, California
- Index to Scientific & Technical Proceedings, a scholarly literature database
- Islamic State – Turkey Province

== See also ==
- ITSP
