= Jen Wolosin =

American politician

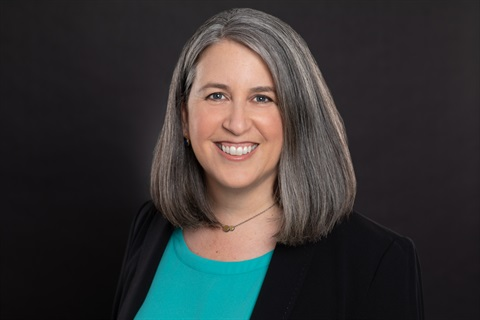

Mayor of Menlo Park, California
- In office 2023–2024
- Preceded by: Betsy Nash
- Succeeded by: Drew Combs

Menlo Park District 3 City Councilor
- In office 2020–2024
- Succeeded by: Jeff Schmidt

Personal details
- Party: Democratic Party
- Children: 2
- Education: University of California, Berkeley; University of California, Davis

Jen Wolosin is an American politician. She served as mayor of Menlo Park, California, in 2023 and city councilor of District 3 in Menlo Park from 2020 to 2024.

== Life and career ==
Wolosin earned a Bachelor's degree in sociology from University of California, Berkeley and a Master of Business Administration from University of California, Davis. Wolosin moved from San Mateo to Menlo Park in 2013. She became involved in municipal politics in 2017 after her poor experiences with traffic inspired her to start Parents for Safe Routes, a group advocating to make schools more walkable.

In 2020, Wolosin ran to become the first District 3 City Council representative of Menlo Park against Chelsea Nguyen and Max Fennell. Wolosin was outspoken in her support to rezone single-family residential areas for duplexes and triplexes, though Nguyen and Fennell also shared similar positions. In November 2020, Wolosin won the election. On December 13, 2022, Wolosin was unanimously voted to become mayor of Menlo Park in 2023.

On March 31, 2024, Wolosin announced that she would not run for reelection for city council. She cited her desire to be involved in her children's high school years as well as her mother's Alzheimer's disease and several friends' cancer diagnoses as contributing factors in her decision. Drew Combs succeeded her role as mayor and Jeff Schmidt succeeded her city council seat on December 10, 2024.

== Personal life ==
Wolosin is Jewish.
