= Francesca Fiorentini =

American journalist, progressive activist, and comedian (b. 1983)

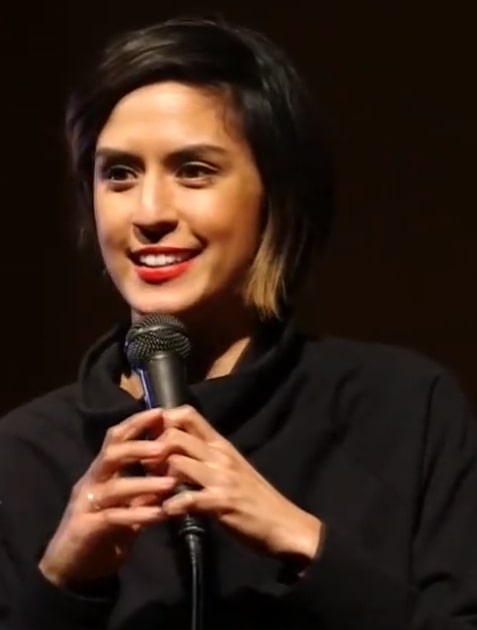
- Fiorentini in 2022
- Born: Francesca Kate Fiorentini; September 10, 1983 (age 43); Palo Alto, California, U.S.
- Citizenship: United States
- Education: Menlo-Atherton High School; New York University (BA)
- Known for: Host of The Bitchuation Room, former contributor to The Young Turks and Al Jazeera
- Spouse: Matt Lieb (m. 2022)
- Children: 1
- Website: www.francescafiorentini.com

Francesca Kate Fiorentini (born September 10, 1983) is an American journalist, progressive political activist, commentator, and comedian.

== Early life and education ==
Fiorentini is a second-generation American daughter of immigrants. Her mother is Chinese and her father is Italian. She grew up in Palo Alto, California, and graduated from Menlo-Atherton High School in 2001.

From 2001 to 2005, Fiorentini studied feminist theory and colonial studies at New York University. Her baccalaureate thesis was entitled Ideas for Action: Postcolonial Feminism.

== Career ==
Fiorentini began her journalism work in 2004 with War Resisters League and Left Turn.

From 2013 to 2019, Fiorentini was a host and senior producer at AJ+, the digital media outlet of Al Jazeera. She was the host of AJ+ show Newsbroke. The channel presented comedic spins on current events, with a focus on outreach to younger audiences. The program covered both current events, as well as larger issues such as white fragility, labor unionism, toxic masculinity, George Soros conspiracies, and gun control. Newsbroke was shortlisted for an Emmy nomination for Outstanding Short-Form Variety Series in 2018. The program was discontinued during June 2018.

From 2016 to 2025, Fiorentini was contributor for the network The Young Turks, where she co-hosted the show The Damage Report with John Iadarola. In March 2025, following disagreements between Fiorentini and The Young Turks founder and presenter Cenk Uygur over what Fiorentini characterized as his "capitulation" towards and "bridge-building" with conservatives, she was fired from the network.

Since 2018, she has hosted her own podcast, The Bitchuation Room.

In December 2019 Fiorentini hosted the special Red, White & Who on MSNBC, discussing the state of healthcare in the United States and the importance of healthcare to American voters beyond the partisan divide. The program traveled to the states of New York, Texas and Utah to talk to voters and featured interviews with political figures such as Senator Bernie Sanders. Fiorentini concluded in the program that "healthcare in America is often overpriced and even dysfunctional, but it’s the lack of transparency that can be the most insidious".

In 2025, Fiorentini co-hosted the YouTube show America Unhinged with Wajahat Ali on the Zeteo network, which is run by Mehdi Hasan.

== Personal life ==
She lives in Los Angeles with her husband, fellow comedian and activist Matt Lieb. They have a daughter, who was born in 2022.
