= Billy Ray White =

American politician (1936–2018)

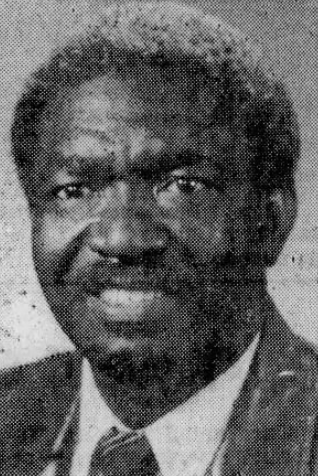

Mayor of Menlo Park
- In office December 1985 – December 1986
- Preceded by: Jack Morris
- Succeeded by: Ted Sorensen
- In office December 1982 – December 1983
- Preceded by: Peg Gunn
- Succeeded by: Peg Gunn
- In office April 1980 – April 1981
- Preceded by: Douglas Dupen
- Succeeded by: Peg Gunn

City Council of Menlo Park
- In office March 1978 – 1990

Personal details
- Born: June 29, 1936 Shelby County, Texas, U.S.
- Died: January 26, 2018 (aged 81) Menlo Park, California, U.S.
- Spouse: Zerlene Victor
- Children: 6
- Education: Prairie View A&M University

Billy Ray White (June 29, 1936 – January 26, 2018) was an American politician who served as the first African-American mayor of Menlo Park, California.

== Biography ==
White was born on June 29, 1936, in Shelby County, Texas, the son of to Amanda (née Mattlock) and Q.W. White. He attended Prairie View A&M University in Prairie View, Texas, for two years. In 1965, he moved to Menlo Park, California living in the mostly Black, Belle Haven neighborhood. Menlo Park at the time had a minority although declining Black population (17.4% in 1970, 14.2% in 1980, and 12.0% in 1990). In 1970, he was named as a commissioner on the Menlo Park Planning Commission. In the April 11, 1972, election, he ran for a four-year term on the Menlo Park City Council, losing by 27 votes to incumbent Douglas Dupen. He lost again in the March 5, 1974, election for City Council in a five-way race for three open seats finishing fifth with 2,203 votes against Ira Bonde (3,610 votes), Jennifer Bigelow (2,924 votes), James Calloway (2,919 votes), and George Liddle (2,844 votes) - which also marked the election of the city's first councilwoman. In the March 7, 1978, election, he ran again for the City Council in an eight-way race for three seats. In an upset victory, with strong support from the Black community, he won election finishing a close third with 2,332 votes, becoming the Menlo Park's first African-American councilmember (Gerry B. Andeen finished first with 2,670 votes and Douglas Dupen finished second with 2,398 votes). In March 1979, he was named in a secret ballot as mayor pro tem with outgoing mayor James Bloch's nomination. In April 1980, he was appointed mayor by the City Council, the first African-American to hold the office in Menlo Park since its incorporation in 1927, succeeding Douglas Dupen. In November 1982, he won re-election to the City Council and was named mayor again by the council in December 1983. In December 1985, he was again appointed mayor, the first mayor to serve for three terms. In November 1986, he won election to another 4-year term on the City Council. During his government service, he was critical in giving the Black community a voice, securing projects to upgrade and maintain street lights, storm drains, and sidewalks in the segregated Belle Haven neighborhood as well as obtaining redevelopment funds for low-income housing.

== Personal life ==
In 1955, he married Zerlene Victor; they had six children. He died on January 26, 2018.

== See also ==
- List of first African-American mayors
- African American mayors in California
