= Phillips Brooks School =

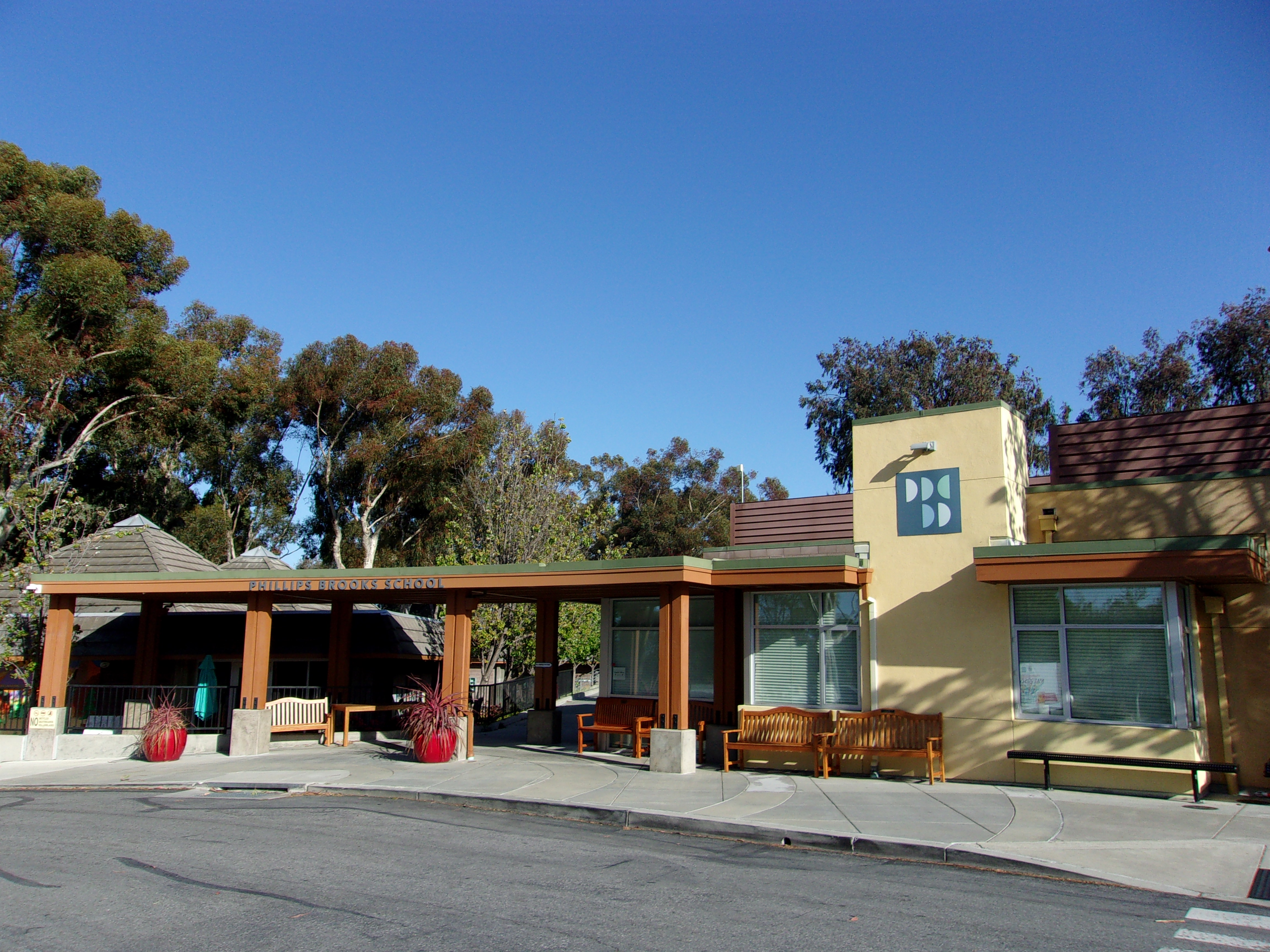

Location
- 2245 Avy Avenue; Menlo Park, CA 94025; USA
- Coordinates: 37°25′45″N 122°12′16″W

Information
- Motto: Inspired learners. Inspiring life.
- Established: 1978
- Head of school: Jennifer Bohnen
- Grades: Preschool (age 3) – 5th
- Gender: Co-ed
- Enrollment: 296
- Average class size: 20
- Student to teacher ratio: 7.5:1
- Campus type: Suburban
- Accreditation: California Association of Independent Schools
- Tuition: $36,475–$43,400
- Website: www.phillipsbrooks.org

The Phillips Brooks School is an independent, coeducational, preschool-grade 5-day school located in Menlo Park, California. The school is commonly known as PBS and was founded in 1978 by a group of teachers and administrators who split off from the nearby Trinity School. The enrollment of PBS is 270 students. The school has the smallest class sizes of any school of its kind in the area.

Phillips Brooks School has actively participated in efforts to make classrooms more attuned to the needs of students, including a focus on identifying the unique ways in which each child learns.

The school is named after Phillips Brooks.

== Potential second campus ==
Phillips Brooks School had purchased a 92-acre (370,000 m^{2}) lot in Woodside, California along Interstate 280 that it planned to redevelop into a second campus. Environmentalists expressed concern that the plans would result in the loss of 1,000 oak trees. Discord in the community regarding the school's development plans was a major issue in the 2001 Woodside Town Council elections. Ultimately the city government blocked the plans. As reported in the local newspaper The Almanac:

School officials balked over the town's open space easement language, saying it was too restrictive and would make building and operating the campus unfeasible. Town staff countered that Phillips Brooks' easement language was too full of loopholes and would not protect areas of pristine open space. ... The project was denied on a 4-3 vote.
