= Jamila Reinhardt =

American rugby union player

- Born: November 17, 1989 (age 36); Fresno, California, U.S.
- Education: Menlo-Atherton High School
- Alma mater: California State University Maritime Academy
- Height: 5 ft 5 in (165 cm)
- Weight: 186 lb (84 kg)

Rugby union career
- Position: Prop (rugby union)
Senior career
| Years | Team | Apps | (Points) |
| - | San Diego Surfers | - | (-) |
International career
| Years | Team | Apps | (Points) |
| 2016-present | United States | 6 | (-) |

Jamila Reinhardt (born November 17, 1989) is an American rugby union player. She made her debut for the United States in 2016. She is a member of the San Diego Surfers Women's Rugby Club and Women's Premier League national champion. She was named in the Eagles 2017 Women's Rugby World Cup squad.

Reinhardt attended Menlo-Atherton High School. She graduated from the California State University Maritime Academy and is a lieutenant in the United States Navy. She began her rugby career in her senior year of college. She previously participated in basketball, shot put and discus.
