= Trinity School (Menlo Park) =

Location
- 2650 Sand Hill Road; San Francisco Bay Area; Menlo Park, San Mateo County, California, California 94025-7018; USA; 37°25′19″N 122°12′27″W

Information
- Established: 1961
- NCES School ID: 00078361
- Head of school: Kate Benson
- Grades: 2 years-old to Grade 5
- Age range: 2-12
- Enrollment: 158 (2025-2026)
- Accreditation: WASC, CAIS
- Website: trinity-mp.org

Trinity School is a private preschool and elementary school located in Menlo Park in the Episcopal tradition with about 160 students.

== History ==
Trinity School was originally formed as Trinity Parish School in 1961 for children of the congregation. In 1978, there was a split within the school and the Phillips Brooks School was created.
