= Menlo Park, California =

- City
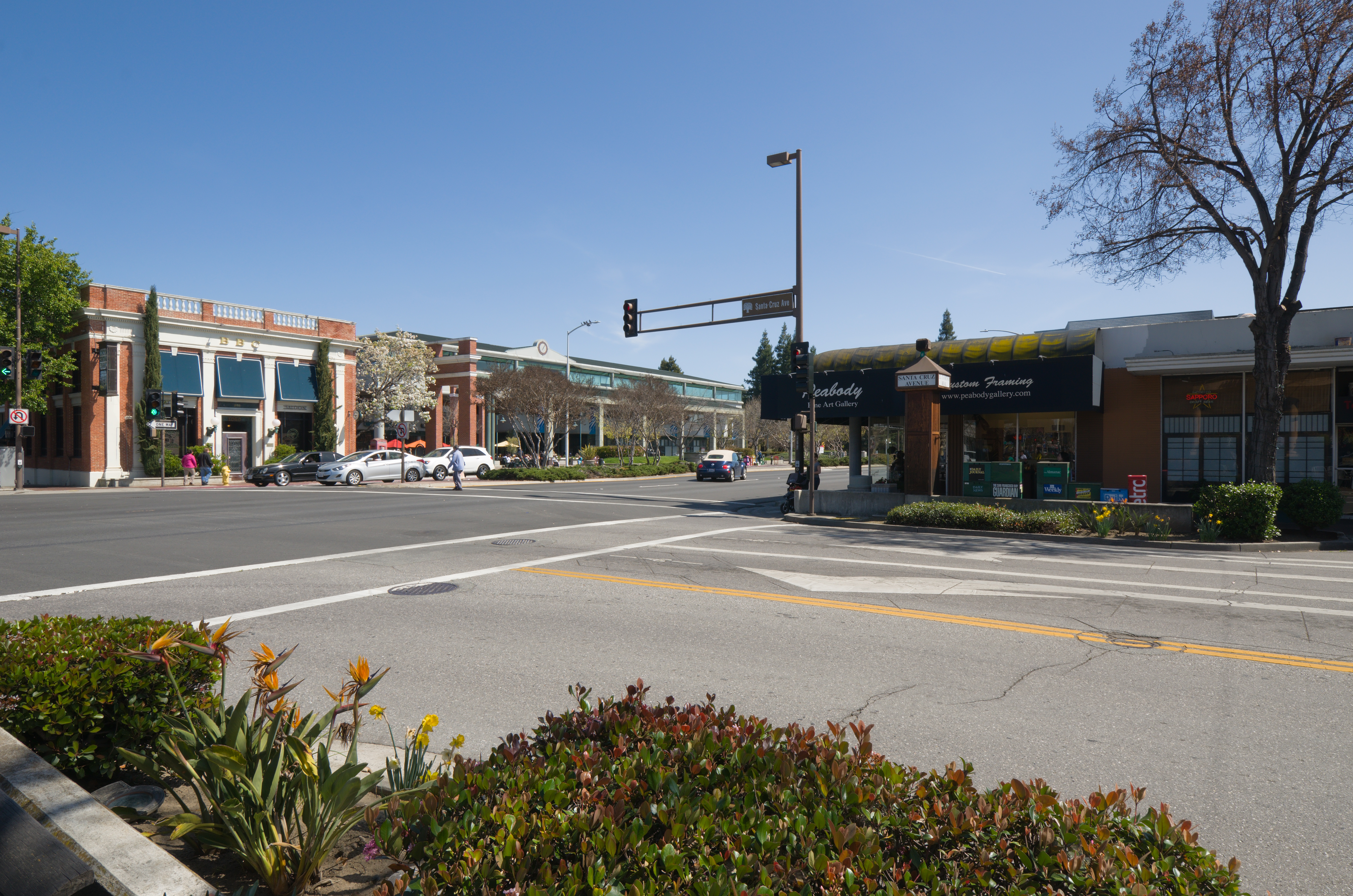
- Downtown Menlo Park

- Interactive map of Menlo Park, California
- Location in the San Francisco Bay Area Location in California Location in the United States
- Coordinates: 37°27′10″N 122°11′00″W
- Country: United States
- State: California
- County: San Mateo
- Incorporated: November 23, 1927
- Named for: Menlo, County Galway, Ireland

Government
  - Mayor: Betsy Nash

Area
  - Total: 17.39 sq mi (45.03 km^{2})
  - Land: 9.99 sq mi (25.87 km^{2})
  - Water: 7.39 sq mi (19.15 km^{2}) 42.54%
- Elevation: 72 ft (22 m)

Population (2020)
  - Total: 33,780
  - Density: 3,473.3/sq mi (1,341.04/km^{2})
- Time zone: UTC−8 (Pacific)
  - Summer (DST): UTC−7 (PDT)
- ZIP Codes: 94025–94028
- Area code: 650
- FIPS code: 06-46870
- GNIS feature IDs: 1659108, 2411079
- Website: menlopark.gov

Menlo Park (/ˈmɛnloʊ/ MEN-loh) is a city in San Mateo County in the San Francisco Bay Area of California, United States. Located at the eastern edge of the county, It is bordered by San Francisco Bay on the north and east; East Palo Alto, Palo Alto, and Stanford to the south; and Atherton, North Fair Oaks, and Redwood City to the west. It had 33,780 residents at the 2020 United States census. Part of Silicon Valley, it is home to the corporate headquarters of Meta Platforms, and is where Google, Roblox Corporation, Round Table Pizza, and SRI International were founded. The train station holds the record as the oldest continually operating train station in California. It is one of the most educated cities in California and the United States; nearly 70% of residents over 25 have earned a bachelor's degree or higher.

== Name ==
"Menlo" is derived from Menlo (the anglicized spelling of Irish Gaelic 'Mionloch', meaning 'small lake') in County Galway, Ireland, today an outer neighborhood of the city of Galway. The name "Menlo Park" was given to a ranch purchased by Irish settlers in honor of their home village in Ireland (c. 1850).

Menlo Park, New Jersey, was named after Menlo Park, California, predating any work done there by Thomas Edison (who relocated there c. 1876); Menlo, Washington, also derived its name from the California community.

== History ==
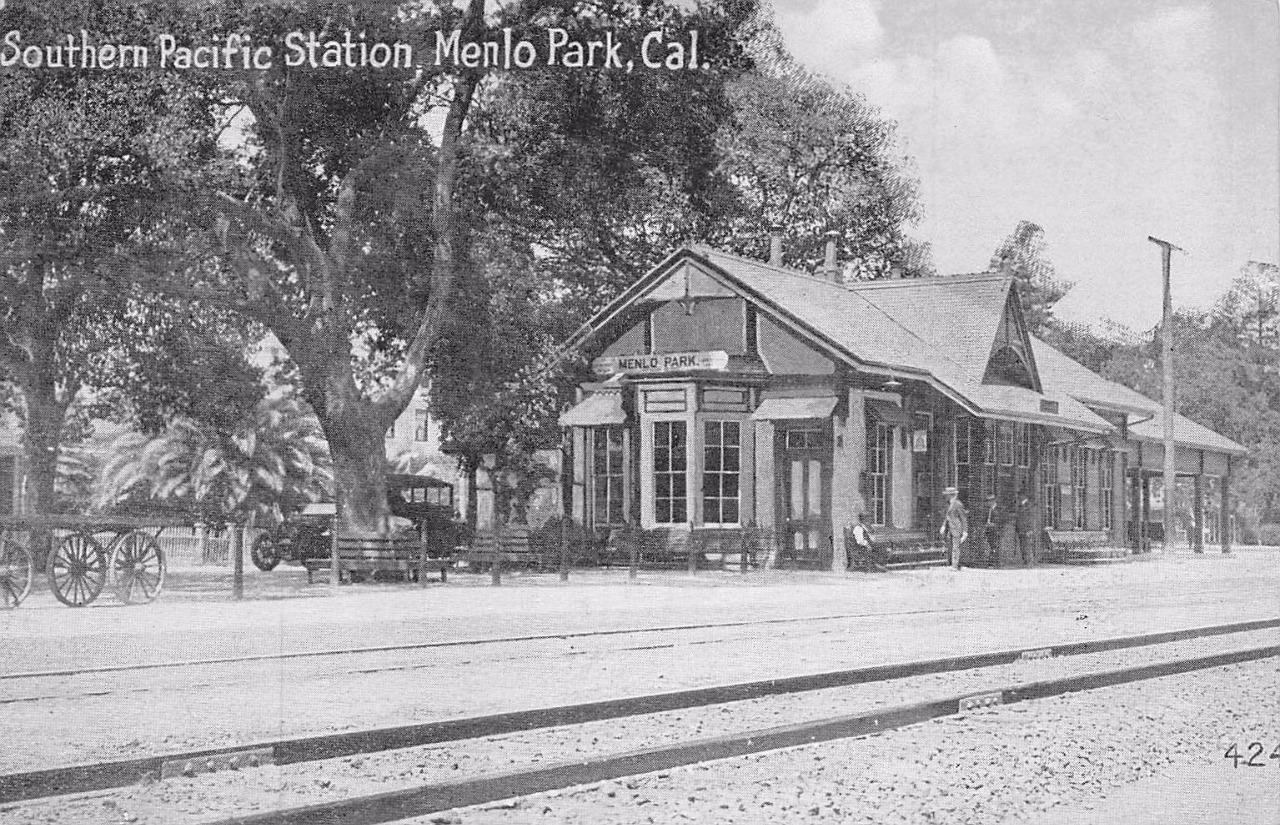
Menlo Park Station, c. 1918

The area of Menlo Park was inhabited by the Ohlone people when the Portolá expedition arrived in 1769.

In 1795, the Rancho de las Pulgas Spanish land grant was made that included the area of the current city.

Before and during the 1849 Gold Rush, successful businessmen from San Francisco, like Faxon Atherton and George C. Johnson began investing in real estate on this portion of the peninsula located midway between San Francisco and San Jose.

=== Original Menlo Park gate ===
In 1851, two Irish immigrants, Dennis J. Oliver and his brother-in-law, D.C. McGlynn, purchased a 1,700-acre (690 ha) tract of land on the former Rancho de las Pulgas. In 1854, they erected a gate with a wooden arch bearing the inscription "Menlo Park" and the date "August 1854" at the entrance to their property (now the intersection of Middle Ave and El Camino Real). The wooden gate was modeled after the stone gate that stands at the entrance to the Menlo Castle estate in Menlo, Ireland.

=== Railroad ===
In 1863, the San Francisco and San Jose Rail Road had built the railroad from San Francisco to as far as Mayfield (now California Avenue station in Palo Alto) and started running trains to the area. They named a nearby station "Menlo Park" after the sign. The 1867 station building still stands on the platform of the current Caltrain station, used by the local Chamber of Commerce. It holds the record as the oldest, continually operating train station in California. The town of Menlo Park grew up around this station, becoming a popular home for San Francisco businessmen. A post office was established in 1870, and the city was incorporated in 1874 (it dissolved after two years, but later was permanently incorporated in 1927). The original arch, which gave its name to the stations and ultimately, the city, survived until 1922, when it was destroyed in an automobile accident.

=== Camp Fremont ===
In 1917–18, a large portion of Menlo Park was the site of Camp Fremont, a training camp for, at its height, 27,000 men being sent to fight in World War I. Army engineers paved the first streets in Menlo Park and laid the first water and gas lines. In the autumn of 1918, a flu pandemic hit Camp Fremont and killed 147. Although the camp was dismantled after the war, its hospital was retained, today the site of a Veterans Administration Hospital off Willow Road in Menlo Park.

=== SRI International ===
At the start of World War II, the US government bought the 260-acre (110 ha) estate of Timothy Hopkins from his widow and created the Palo Alto General Hospital, later renamed the Dibble General Hospital (after Colonel John Dibble, who was killed in 1943). After the war ended, some of the land was sold to the city and became the sites of the main library and city hall. More of the land was bought by Stanford University to house the increase in students due to the G.I. Bill; the area was known as the "Stanford Village", which existed as student housing until the mid-1960s. This land also was the site of the Stanford Research Institute (now SRI International) starting in 1947; between 1955 and 1968, SRI bought the rest of the Stanford Village.

=== Sunset magazine headquarters ===
Sunset magazine had its headquarters in Menlo Park from 1951 to 2015, designed by architect, Cliff May, with a similar layout to a California ranch-style house. Sunset referred to its Menlo Park headquarters as the Laboratory of Western Living.

=== Sharon Heights ===
In the 1960s, the former 600-acre (240 ha) estate of Frederick W. Sharon (1859–1914) (son of Senator William Sharon) and his wife, Louise Tevis Breckinridge Sharon (1858–1938; daughter of Lloyd Tevis and divorced wife of John Witherspoon Breckinridge), in the hills of south west Menlo Park was developed and called "Sharon Heights".

=== Development of Google ===
The development of leading Internet search engine provider Google occurred in 1998 in the garage in a Menlo Park home owned by Susan Wojcicki. Wojcicki's Menlo Park garage was used as the office for Google co-founders Larry Page and Sergey Brin for $1,700 a month.

=== Replica of Menlo Park gate ===
In 2015, the Menlo Park Historical Association (MPHA) began a project to raise funds for and build a replica of the original Menlo Park gates. The completed gate was placed in front of the Menlo Park public library at 800 Alma Street, and officially dedicated on March 17, 2019, by Menlo Park Mayor Ray Mueller.

== Geography ==
According to the United States Census Bureau, the city has a total area of 17.4 square miles (45 km^{2}), of which 10.0 square miles (26 km^{2}) are land and 7.4 square miles (19 km^{2}) are covered by water. Menlo Park is long and narrow on a northeast to southwest axis. The northeastern portion borders the San Francisco Bay and includes the Dumbarton Bridge that connects Menlo Park to Fremont on the eastern side of the bay. The city shoreline includes the city's largest park, Bedwell Bayfront Park (160 acres; 65 ha) and the Don Edwards San Francisco Bay National Wildlife Refuge. San Francisquito Creek marks much of the southeastern border of the city. West Menlo Park (unincorporated area) along Alameda de las Pulgas nearly separates the southwestern part of the city (known as Sharon Heights) from the rest. The extreme southwest is clipped by Interstate 280.

The Bayshore Freeway (part of U.S. Route 101) traverses Menlo Park from northwest to southeast near the shoreline, and somewhat parallel to the Bayshore Freeway to the southwest is El Camino Real. The intersection of El Camino Real and Santa Cruz Avenue is considered the heart of the city. The Menlo Park Civic Center is nearby. Other major roads include Sand Hill Road in the Sharon Heights area.

== Demographics ==
Historical population
Census	Pop.	Note	%±
1930	2,254		—
1940	3,258		44.5%
1950	13,587		317.0%
1960	26,957		98.4%
1970	26,826		−0.5%
1980	26,438		−1.4%
1990	28,040		6.1%
2000	30,785		9.8%
2010	32,026		4.0%
2020	33,780		5.5%
U.S. Decennial Census; 1860–1870 1880-1890; 1900 1910 1920; 1930 1940 1950; 1960 1970 1980; 1990 2000 2010

=== Racial and ethnic composition ===
Menlo Park city, California – Racial and ethnic composition Note: the US Census treats Hispanic/Latino as an ethnic category. This table excludes Latinos from the racial categories and assigns them to a separate category. Hispanics/Latinos may be of any race.
Race / Ethnicity (NH = Non-Hispanic)	Pop 2000	Pop 2010	Pop 2020	% 2000	% 2010	% 2020
White alone (NH)	20,452	19,841	18,575	66.43%	61.95%	54.99%
Black or African American alone (NH)	2,124	1,482	1,001	6.90%	4.63%	2.96%
Native American or Alaska Native alone (NH)	52	43	26	0.17%	0.13%	0.08%
Asian alone (NH)	2,184	3,132	5,764	7.09%	9.78%	17.06%
Native Hawaiian or Pacific Islander alone (NH)	388	446	364	1.26%	1.39%	1.08%
Other race alone (NH)	82	73	156	0.27%	0.23%	0.46%
Mixed race or Multiracial (NH)	700	1,107	1,905	2.27%	3.46%	5.64%
Hispanic or Latino (any race)	4,803	5,902	5,989	15.60%	18.43%	17.73%
Total	30,785	32,026	33,780	100.00%	100.00%	100.00%

=== 2020 census ===
It had 33,780 residents at the 2020 United States census. The U.S. Census Bureau estimated Menlo Park's population at 32,713 as of July 1, 2025.

The population density was 11,911.1 inhabitants per square mile (4,598.9/km^{2}). The median age was 38.2 years. 23.2% of residents were under the age of 18, and 15.5% were 65 years of age or older. For every 100 females, there were 95.5 males, and for every 100 females age 18 and over, there were 93.0 males age 18 and over.

The census reported that 98.8% of the population lived in households, 0.4% lived in non-institutionalized group quarters, and 0.8% were institutionalized. Menlo Park was 100.0% urban and 0.0% rural.

There were 12,743 households, of which 34.2% had children under the age of 18 living in them. Of all households, 52.2% were married-couple households, 5.7% were cohabiting couple households, 16.5% had a male householder with no spouse or partner present, and 25.6% had a female householder with no spouse or partner present. About 25.7% of households were one person, and 10.6% had someone living alone who was 65 years of age or older. The average household size was 2.62. There were 8,192 families (64.3% of all households).

There were 13,857 housing units at an average density of 4,886.1 units per square mile (1,886.5 units/km^{2}). Of all housing units, 8.0% were vacant and 92.0% were occupied. Of occupied units, 52.9% were owner-occupied and 47.1% were occupied by renters. The homeowner vacancy rate was 1.0%, and the rental vacancy rate was 6.5%.

=== 2023 ACS estimates ===
In 2023, the US Census Bureau estimated that the median household income was $206,588, and the per capita income was $123,422. About 2.3% of families and 5.1% of the population were below the poverty line.

=== 2010 census ===
The 2010 United States census reported that Menlo Park had a population of 32,026. Its population density was 3,271.3 inhabitants per square mile (1,263.1/km^{2}). The racial makeup of Menlo Park was 22,494 (70.2%) White, 1,551 (4.8%) African American, 156 (0.5%) Native American, 3,157 (9.9%) Asian, 454 (1.4%) Pacific Islander, 2,776 (8.7%) from other races, and 1,438 (4.5%) from two or more races. Hispanics or Latinos of any race were 18.4% of the population, most of whom (4,303) were of Mexican ancestry.

The Census reported that 31,181 people (97.4% of the population) lived in households, 599 (1.9%) lived in noninstitutionalized group quarters, and 246 (0.8%) were institutionalized.

Of the 12,347 households, 33.3% had children under the age of 18 living in them, 49.9% were opposite-sex married couples living together, 8.4% had a female householder with no husband present, and 3.0% had a male householder with no wife present. About 5.2% were unmarried opposite-sex partnerships, and 0.8% were same-sex married couples or partnerships. About 29.7% were made up of individuals, and 11.1% had someone living alone who was 65 years of age or older. The average household size was 2.53. The average family size was 3.20.

In terms of age, 7,805 residents (24.4%) were under the age of 18, 1,817 people (5.7%) aged 18 to 24, 9,563 people (29.9%) aged 25 to 44, 8,263 people (25.8%) aged 45 to 64, and 4,578 people (14.3%) were 65 years of age or older. The median age was 38.7 years. For every 100 females, there were 93.7 males. For every 100 females age 18 and over, there were 91.5 males.

The 13,085 housing units averaged 1,336.6 units per square mile (516.1 units/km^{2}), of which 6,927 (56.1%) were owner-occupied, and 5,420 (43.9%) were occupied by renters. The homeowner vacancy rate was 1.1%; the rental vacancy rate was 5.2%; 18,972 people (59.2% of the population) lived in owner-occupied housing units and 12,209 people (38.1%) lived in rental housing units.

== Government and politics ==
City Council members are elected in districts to staggered four-year terms, in nonpartisan municipal elections every two years.

=== County, state and federal representation ===
On the San Mateo County Board of Supervisors, Menlo Park is split between Supervisorial District 3 (west of El Camino Real) and Supervisorial District 4 (east of El Camino Real), currently represented by Ray Mueller and Lisa Gauthier, respectively.

In the California State Legislature, Menlo Park is in the 13th senatorial district, represented by Democrat Josh Becker, and is split between the 21st Assembly district, represented by Democrat Diane Papan and the 23rd Assembly district, represented by Democrat Marc Berman.

In the United States House of Representatives, East Palo Alto is split between California's 15th congressional district, represented by Democrat Kevin Mullin, and California's 16th congressional district, represented by Democrat Sam Liccardo.

According to the California Secretary of State, as of February 10, 2019, Menlo Park has 19,339 registered voters—9,984 (51.6%) of whom are registered Democrats, 2,989 (15.5%) registered Republicans, and 5,683 (29.4%) undeclared.

=== Mayors ===
Mayors of Menlo Park, California

Image	Mayor	Years	Notes
	Alfred E. Blake	1927–1928	First mayor of Menlo Park
	Harry Weeden	1928–1929	
	F.C. Ellis	1929–?	
	?		
	Charles Burgess	1945–1953	
	Michael Belangie	1953–1954	
	Charles Burgess	1954–1957	
	William Lawson	1957–1969	
	Ira Bonde	1969–1976	

In 1976, the City Council limited mayors from serving consecutive one-year terms.

Image	Mayor	Years	Notes
	James Calloway	1977	
	?	1978	
	James Bloch	1979	
	Douglas Dupen	1980	
	Billy Ray White	1981	First African-American mayor
	Peg Gunn	1982	First woman mayor
	Billy Ray White	1983	
	Peg Gunn	1984	
	Jack Morris	1985	
	Billy Ray White	1986	
	Ted Sorensen	1987	
	?	1988	
	?	1989	
	Gerald Grant	1990	
	Ted Sorensen	1991	
	Jack Morris	1992	
	?	1993	
	Bob McNamara	1994	
	Raymond "Dee" Tolles	1995	
	Bob Burmeister	1996	
	Steve Schmidt	1997	
	Charles Kinney	1998	
	Paul Collacchi	1999	
	Mary Jo Borak	2000	
	Nicholas Jellins	2001	
	Steve Schmidt	2002	
	Nicholas Jellins	2003	
	Lee B. Duboc	2004	
	Mickie Winkler	2005	
	Nicholas Jellins	2006	
	Kelly Fergusson	2007	
	Andy Cohen	2008	
	Heyward Robinson	2009	
	Richard Cline	2010	
	Kelly Fergusson	x	Appointed December 7, 2010; Resigned December 10, 2010, due to Brown Act violations after separately soliciting three councilmembers to appoint her to the position
	Richard Cline	2011	
	Kirsten Keith	2012	
	Peter Ohtaki	2013	
	Ray Mueller	2014	
	Catherine Carlton	2015	
	Richard Cline	2016	
	Kirsten Keith	2017	
	Peter Ohtaki	2018	
	Ray Mueller	2019	
	Cecilia Taylor	2020	
	Drew Combs	2021	
	Betsy Nash	2022	
	Jen Wolosin	2023	
	Drew Combs	2024	
	Betsy Nash	2025	

== Education ==
For primary schools, the central portions of Menlo Park are served by the Menlo Park City School District, while the Belle Haven neighborhood and VA hospital are served by the Ravenswood City School District, and the Sharon Heights and Stanford Hills neighborhoods served by the Las Lomitas Elementary School District. For high school, Menlo Park is part of the Sequoia Union High School District, with all of the city falling into the boundaries of Menlo-Atherton High School; some areas of the city have the option to attend Woodside High School.

Private elementary schools include two Catholic parochial schools, St. Raymond Catholic Elementary School and Nativity Elementary School; the Episcopalian Trinity School; Phillips Brooks School, pre-kindergarten to 5th grade; and Peninsula School, from kindergarten to 8th grade.

The Willows Campus of the private K–12 Silicon Valley International School, formerly known as German-American International School and Alto International School, is also in the city. Menlo School, a private middle and high school, is in Atherton on the border with Menlo Park. Sacred Heart School, Atherton, a Catholic middle and high school, is also in Atherton on the border with Menlo Park.

For higher education, Saint Patrick's Seminary and University is a Catholic seminary in Menlo Park.

There are two libraries, the Main branch and the Belle Haven branch. As part of the Peninsula Library System, they share many resources with other nearby libraries.

== Economy ==
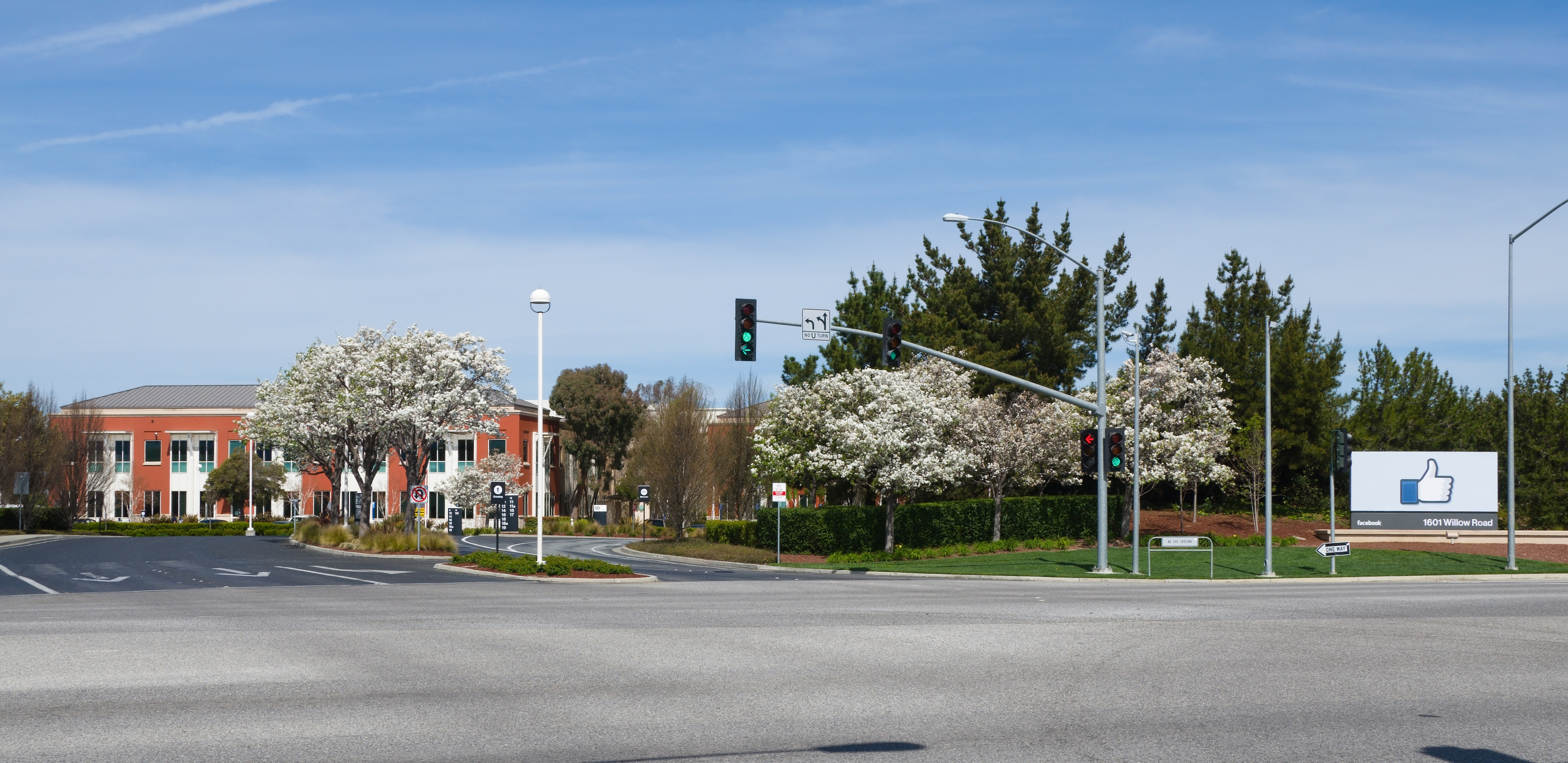
Entry to Facebook (then known as Meta Platforms), 2013

Much of Menlo Park's economy revolves around the companies on Sand Hill Road, consisting of venture capital, private equity, financial services, law firms, and other professional service companies and investment vehicles focusing on technology. Geron, Katerra, Robert Half International, Exponent, and SRI International are among the companies based in Menlo Park. Meta Platforms moved its headquarters to the former campus of Sun Microsystems in Menlo Park in December 2011.

=== Top employers ===
In 2012, Meta (then known as Facebook) announced it would be Menlo Park's biggest employer, with 6,600 employees. According to the city's 2024 annual comprehensive financial report, the city's top employers were:

#	Employer	# of Employees
1	Meta	12,159
2	SRI International	623
3	Robert Half	603
4	Evalve, Inc.	550
5	Robinhood	547
6	Mainspring Energy, Inc.	375
7	Pacific Biosciences	350
8	Grail	325
9	SHR Hotel, LLC	321
10	City of Menlo Park	291

== Transportation ==
Santa Cruz Avenue is the main street in Menlo Park; it terminates at El Camino Real which runs concurrently with California State Route 82. The city is also the western end of the Dumbarton Bridge, which connects Menlo Park with the East Bay city of Fremont; the Menlo Park end is located immediately adjacent to Meta Platforms' headquarters. The city is flanked by U.S. Route 101 on its eastern end and by Interstate 280 on its western end.

Menlo Park's transit is primarily served by Menlo Park station, served by Caltrain. SamTrans is the primary provider of bus transport throughout the city. Menlo Park's eastern ends were previously considered for a short-lived BART extension along the Bayshore Freeway.

BART and Caltrain are also the primary transit modes for Menlo Park's connections to the San Francisco Bay Area's airports. Menlo Park is located about halfway between San Francisco International Airport and San Jose International Airport; the former can be accessed by using Caltrain and either BART's Red, or Yellow Line during 3-line service, or SamTrans route 292 (both connecting to Caltrain at Millbrae station), while the latter connects to Menlo Park through Caltrain and VTA services through a transfer at Diridon station. Drivers to and from Menlo Park can connect to both San Jose and San Francisco airports through using US 101. Oakland Airport is the farthest of the three major Bay Area airports from Menlo Park, with drivers having to cross the Bay through one of the three bridges across it, and transit users needing to use either the Dumbarton Express, SamTrans, or Caltrain to connect to BART services.

== Notable people ==
- Anthony Bajada, inventor of the "stay tab" press-to-open lid mechanism for drink cans
- Vinod Khosla, founder of Sun Microsystems, founder of Khosla Ventures
- Ari Balogh, racing driver
- Isaac Baron, poker player
- Will Brill, actor
- Lindsey Buckingham, musician
- Henry Cowell, composer
- Brandon Crawford, San Francisco Giants shortstop
- Abby Dahlkemper, soccer player
- Tierna Davidson, soccer player
- Marion Dorn, textile designer
- Steve Duda, musician and DJ
- Jeanne DuPrau, author
- David Eagleman, neuroscientist and author
- Nancy Farmer, author
- Kevin A. Gilroy, United States Air Force colonel and politician
- Paul Goldstein, tennis player and coach
- Ari Greenberg, world junior contract bridge champion
- Vince Guaraldi, jazz musician
- Chris Gulker, photographer, writer
- Jack Herrick, founder of wikiHow
- Jon Huntsman, Jr., former Utah governor
- Edward Darlington Jones, United States Coast Guard vice admiral
- Edward Michael Keating, magazine publisher, journalist, author, lawyer; founder of Ramparts, member of the New Left movement.
- Ken Kesey, author
- William R. Larson, founder of Round Table Pizza
- Milton Latham, railroad baron and politician
- Jesse Love, NASCAR driver
- Josie Maran, model and entrepreneur
- Abraham Maslow, co-founder of Humanistic Psychology
- Bob Melvin, baseball player and manager
- Fred Moore, political activist
- Harris Mowbray Braille-related linguist
- John Naber, Olympic swimmer
- Stevie Nicks, musician
- Elizabeth Osborn, equestrian vaulter
- Robert Rich, musician
- Ariel Rittenhouse, Olympic diver
- Secondhand Serenade, rock band founded in Menlo Park
- Ram Shriram, founding investor of Google
- Courtney Thorne-Smith, actress
- Thorstein Veblen, sociologist
- John Vesely, musician/songwriter
- Bob Weir, founding member of The Grateful Dead
- Sheryl Sandberg, former chief operating officer of Meta Platforms.
- Billy Ray White, first African-American mayor of Menlo Park
- Marco Zappacosta, co-founder of Thumbtack

== Sister cities ==
- Bizen, Japan
- (Republic of Ireland) Galway, Ireland
- Kochi, India
- Xinbei District (Changzhou), China

== See also ==
- Holy Cross Cemetery (Menlo Park, California)
- Menlo Park, New Jersey
- Menlo Park (Pretoria, South Africa)
- The Almanac (Menlo Park)
- Ravenswood Post (Menlo Park, California)
