= San Francisco Chinese New Year Festival and Parade =

Public celebration of the Chinese New Year

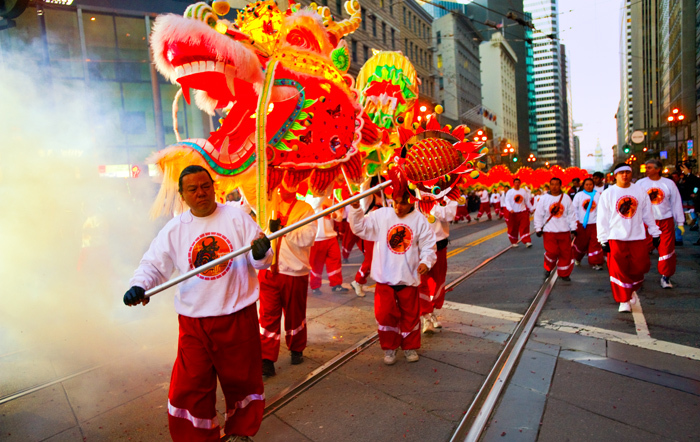
- The Chinese New Year Parade in 2009, the Year of the Ox
- Status: active
- Frequency: Annually
- Locations: Chinatown, San Francisco, California, United States
- Inaugurated: 1953 (private events date to 1858)
- Most recent: Feb 14, 2026–Mar 8, 2026
- Next event: Jan 30, 2027–Feb 21, 2027 (+Mar 7, 2027)
- Sponsor: Alaska Airlines

The San Francisco Chinese New Year Festival and Parade is an annual event in San Francisco, California, United States. Held for approximately two weeks following the first day of the Chinese New Year, it combines elements of the Chinese Lantern Festival with a typical American parade. First held in 1851, along what are today Grant Avenue and Kearny Street, it is the oldest and one of the largest events of its kind outside of Asia, and one of the largest Asian cultural events in North America. The parade route begins on Market Street and terminates in Chinatown.

Highlights of the parade include floats, lion dancers, school groups in costume, marching bands, stilt walkers, Chinese acrobats, and a Golden Dragon. Observers can expect to hear at least 600,000 firecrackers, and are advised to bring ear plugs.

The Golden Dragon is one of the highlights of the parade, considered the "Grand Finale" of the parade. It is made in Foshan, China and is 268 feet long, and takes a team of 100 men and women from the martial arts group Leung's White Crane Lion and Dragon Dance Association to carry it.

The parade is hosted by the San Francisco Chinese Chamber of Commerce. Corporate sponsors have included Southwest Airlines and Alaska Airlines. A similar street festival, the Autumn Moon Festival, has been held annually in Chinatown since 1991 to celebrate the Mid-Autumn or Moon Festival, approximately six months after the New Year festival and parade, and is hosted by the Chinatown Merchants Association of San Francisco.

== History ==
=== Early celebrations ===
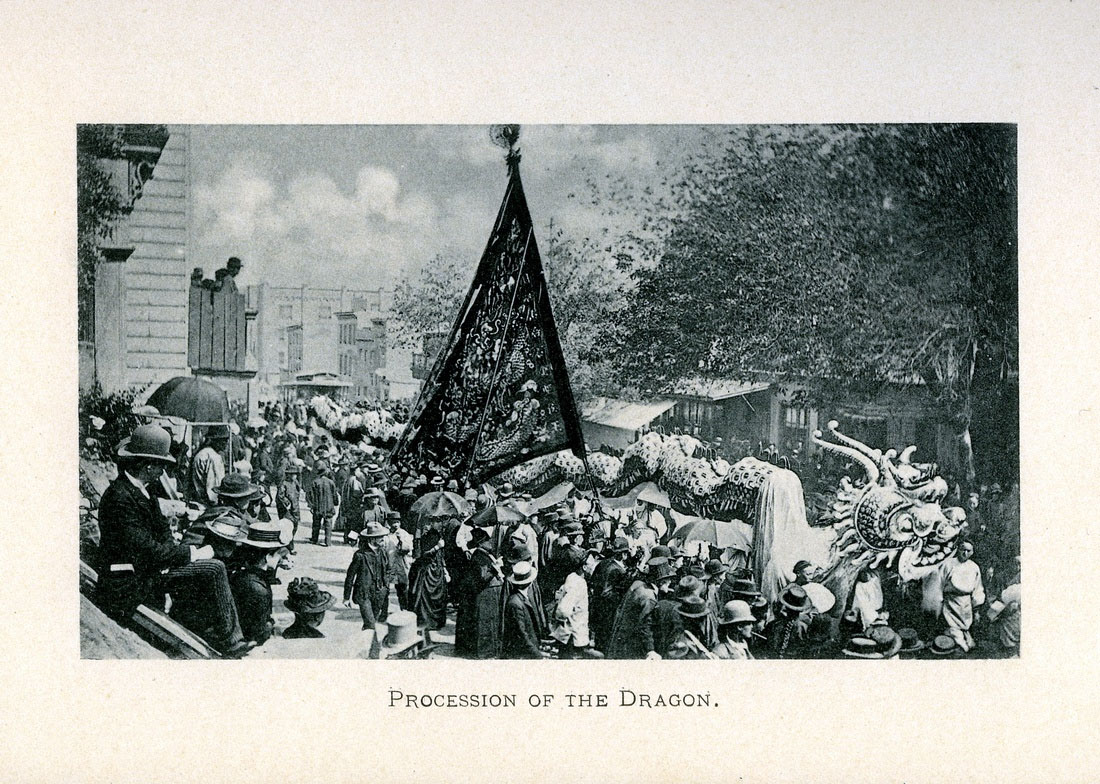
Procession of the Dragon (1892)

During the California Gold Rush, many Chinese immigrants came to San Francisco to work in gold mines and on railroads in search of wealth and a better life. The earliest recorded New Year's celebration was "a great feast" on February 1, 1851, and the first dragon dance in San Francisco was held for the New Year in 1860. In the 1860s, the Chinese community wanted to share their Chinese culture with others; they blended their traditions with a favorite American tradition—the parade—and held a parade with flags, banners, lanterns, drums and firecrackers.

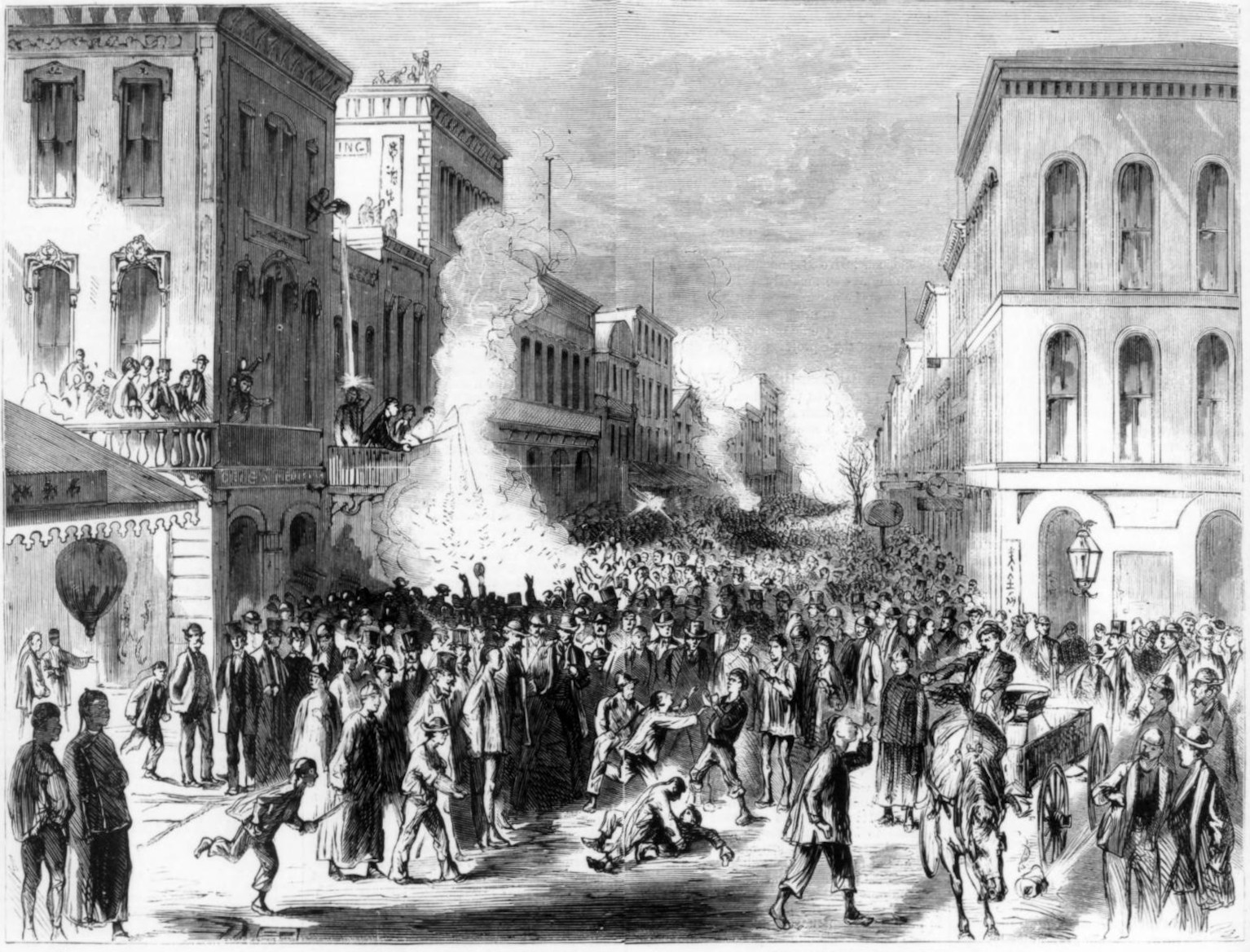
"Chinamen Celebrating Their New-Year's Day in San Francisco" (1871, Harper's Weekly)

Harper's Weekly covered the 1871 celebration from a Caucasian perspective: "Our illustrations on page 260 will give the reader a vivid idea of the way in which the Chinese keep their New-Year's Day in San Francisco. Their year commences on the 18th of February, but the festivities continue for several days, to the great annoyance of the people, as the principal diversion is the constant explosion of fire-crackers and bombs." The San Francisco Call noted the holiday in an 1892 article, writing that "no nation [celebrates] the New Year ... with greater rejoicing and feasting than the Chinese", adding that "[m]any white residents who at other times united in saying 'the Chinese must go' find it convenient to invade Chinatown during the holidays and freely partake of Celestial hospitality. Some go further than this and try to carry off everything that is not nailed down."

=== Modern beginnings ===
San Francisco Chinese New Year Parade dates
Year	Date	Ref.	Year	Date	Ref.	Year	Date	Ref.
Modern parades began in 1953			1960	Feb 05		1970	Feb 14	
Modern parades began in 1953			1961	Feb 26		1971	Feb 06	
Modern parades began in 1953			1962	Feb 24		1972	Feb 26	
1953	Feb 15		1963	Feb 09		1973	Feb 17	
1954	Feb 05		1964	Feb 22		1974	Feb 09	?
1955	Jan 30		1965	Feb 13		1975	Feb 22	
1956	Feb 19		1966	Jan 29		1976	Feb 14	
1957	Feb 02		1967	Feb 25		1977	Mar 05	
1958	Feb 23		1968	Feb 10		1978	Feb 18	
1959	Feb 14		1969	Mar 01		1979	Feb 10	?
Year	Date	Ref.	Year	Date	Ref.	Year	Date	Ref.
1980	Mar 01		1990	Feb 10		2000	Feb 19	
1981	Feb 21		1991	Mar 02	?	2001	Feb 03	
1982	Jan 30		1992	Feb 15	?	2002	Feb 23	
1983	Feb 26		1993	Feb 06		2003	Feb 15	
1984	Feb 18	?	1994	Feb 26	?	2004	Feb 07	
1985	Mar 02		1995	Feb 11	?	2005	Feb 19	
1986	Feb 22	?	1996	Mar 02	?	2006	Feb 11	
1987	Feb 07		1997	Feb 22	?	2007	Mar 03	
1988	Feb 27		1998	Feb 14	?	2008	Feb 23	
1989	Feb 18	?	1999	Feb 27		2009	Feb 07	
Year	Date	Ref.	Year	Date	Ref.	Year	Date	Ref.
2010	Feb 27		2020	Feb 08				
2011	Feb 19		2021	Cancelled				
2012	Feb 11		2022	Feb 19				
2013	Feb 23		2023	Feb 04				
2014	Feb 15		2024	Feb 24				
2015	Mar 07		2025	Feb 15				
2016	Feb 20							
2017	Feb 11							
2018	Feb 24							
2019	Feb 23							

In 1951, a week-long celebration included an anti-Communist parade with the theme "Torches of Liberty", staged by the Chinese Six Companies and attended by a crowd of 10,000. Special police permission was granted to use firecrackers. The 1952 event was similarly colored by anti-Communist sentiments. During the Korean War, a group of Chinese-American leaders, led by H. K. Wong, expanded the parade into the San Francisco Chinese New Year Festival to take place on February 15, 1953, including art shows, street dances, martial arts, music, and a fashion show. Wong, frustrated by news coverage of gambling arrests in Chinatown, believed that educating Americans about the most significant Chinese holiday would turn around the bad press: "Many celebrants who come to Chinatown for this grand New Year never knew that Chinese New Year was celebrated privately prior to 1953. The introduction of the Chinese New Year Festival in 1953 eliminated that 'mystery Chinese' feeling of people outside of the Chinese Community." Wong organized a Chinese New Year Festival committee, whose members included restaurateur Johnny Kan and businessman Paul Louie.

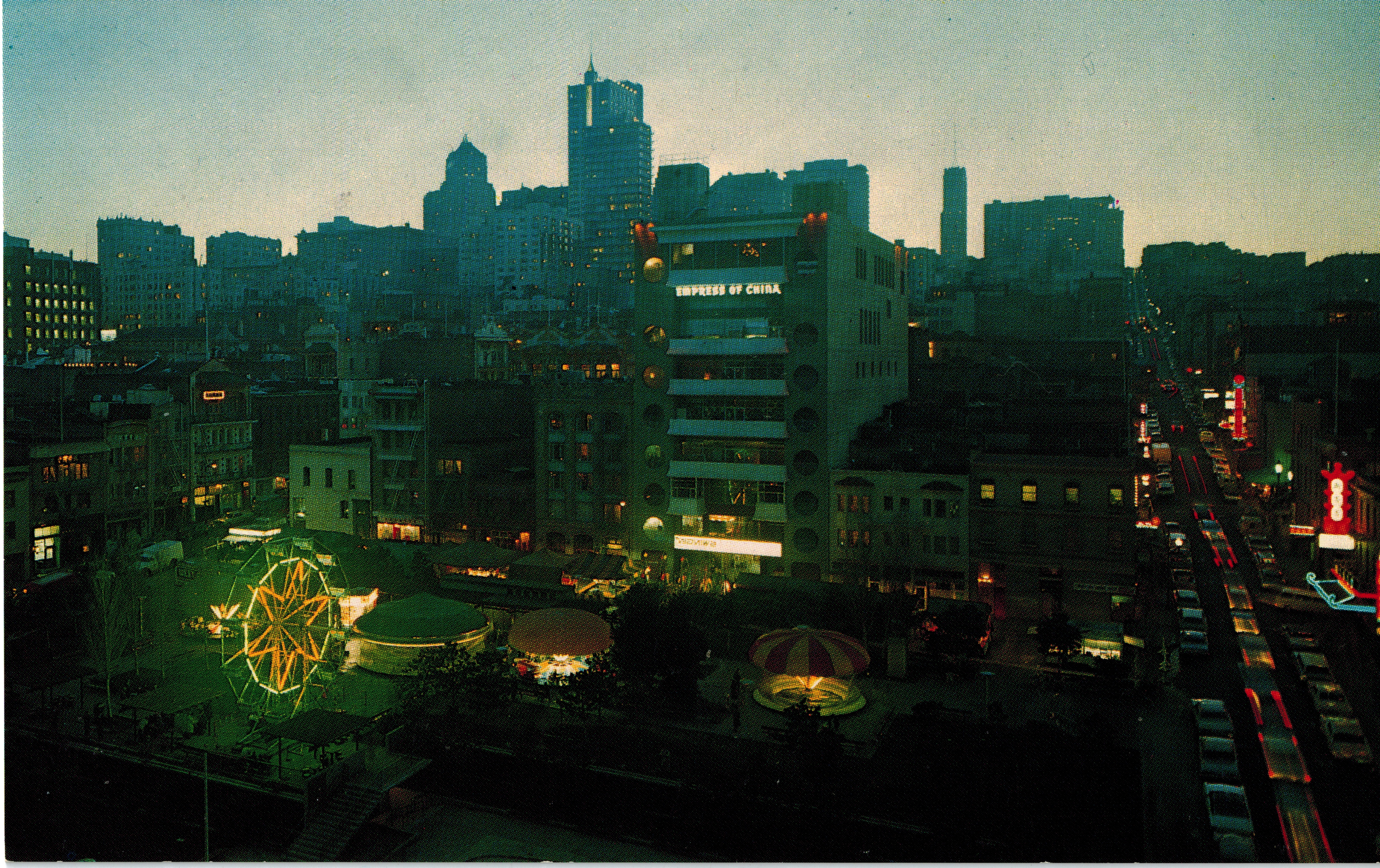
Carnival in Portsmouth Square (c. 1967)

The 1953 parade was led by Grand Marshall Joe Wong, a blind Korean war veteran, featuring the Miss Chinatown festival queen and of course the dragon; that year marked the first modern San Francisco Chinese New Year Festival intended for the wider public. A crowd of 140,000 watched the parade. The celebrations were expanded to three days in 1954. In 1955, the Festival lasted for a week and concluded with a parade up Grant Avenue. The celebrations were shortened to three days in 1956, and the parade was moved into the afternoon so it could be televised. A new dragon the length of a city block, later stated as 150 feet (46 m), was imported from Hong Kong for the 1957 parade. By 1958, the festival queen contest had been formally expanded into the pageant of Miss Chinatown USA. The festival resumed its week-long duration by 1963, including a street carnival that was held since at least 1960. The carnival was criticized for having little cultural connection to Chinese New Year traditions, and the Wah Ching attempted to burn it in 1968; the gaming booths were discontinued for the 1969 Festival.

=== Current celebration ===
The parade has since developed over the decades into one of the grandest nighttime illuminated parades in the US, and one of the largest celebrations of Asian culture outside of Asia, although it has been criticized as presenting an inauthentic "stereotypic and fossilized" or "chop suey image" of Chinese culture. The cost of tickets to the pageant and carnival meant that relatively impoverished Chinese American families could only afford to attend the crowded parade, in effect excluding those whose heritage the Festival was meant to celebrate. The 1977 Parade included a wedding procession in an attempt to introduce more "authentic" cultural content; this was the brainchild of organizer David Lei, newly hired that year by the San Francisco Convention and Visitor's Bureau, which had become a co-sponsor in 1963.

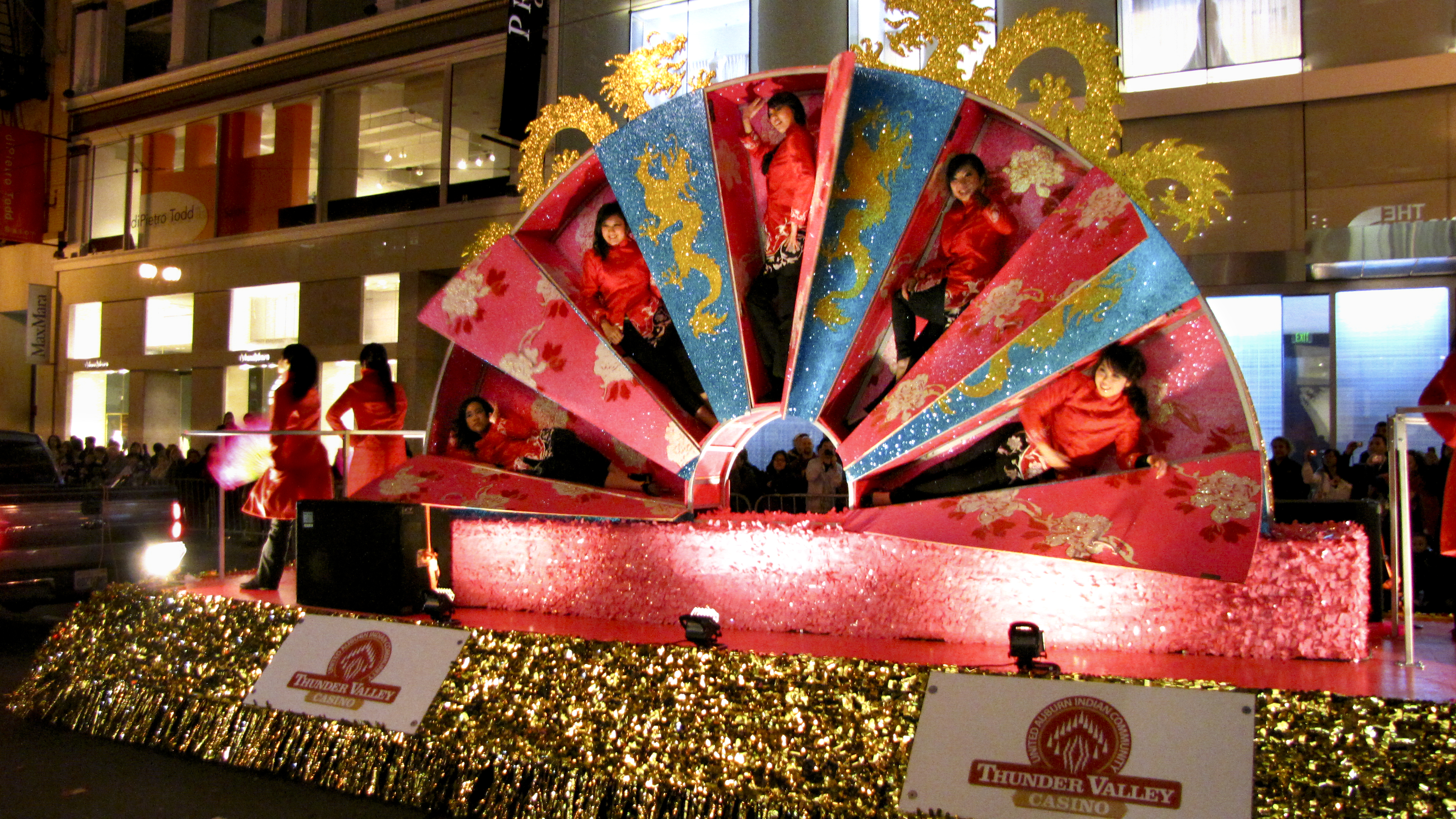
Float sponsored by Thunder Valley Casino (2010)

In 1981, an estimated crowd of 250,000 watched the parade. The idea of corporate sponsorship was first broached in 1987, and parade units began to prominently display their sponsor's names. Local television stations began to broadcast the parade in 1988; the next year, it was being carried in six markets across the United States, from Honolulu to New York, and by 1994, the Travel Channel had picked up the broadcast. That year, the Gay Asian Pacific Alliance was the first gay rights group to participate in the parade; their presence was received with boisterous support. By 1996, naming rights had been sold to the San Francisco Chronicle and the event was publicized as the "San Francisco Chronicle Chinese New Year Festival and Parade"; television coverage de-emphasized the event's connection with Chinatown altogether in favor of more typical San Francisco sights, such as its skyline and the Golden Gate Bridge. As of 2017 it was considered the largest Asian event in North America, and the largest general market even in Northern California. It was also named as one of the world's top ten parades.

For several decades, the parade was organized by Chinatown activist Rose Pak, who died in 2016. Pak was known for her outspoken comments about local politicians as they were passing by the central grandstand at Jackson and Kearny streets. As reported by the San Francisco Chronicle, Pak's quips "ranged from humorous to mean, but they were almost always pointed and pertinent to Chinatown's interests".

From 2004 on, Pak barred Falun Gong, a religious movement banned in China, from further participation for violating parade rules by distributing leaflets. The group and others, including San Francisco Supervisor Chris Daly, subsequently criticized Pak for allegedly enforcing the will of the Chinese government.

Citing the COVID-19 pandemic, the parade scheduled for 2021 was canceled in November 2020; the floats and painted ox sculptures will be on static display for the public. The parade returned on February 19, 2022.

== Festival events ==
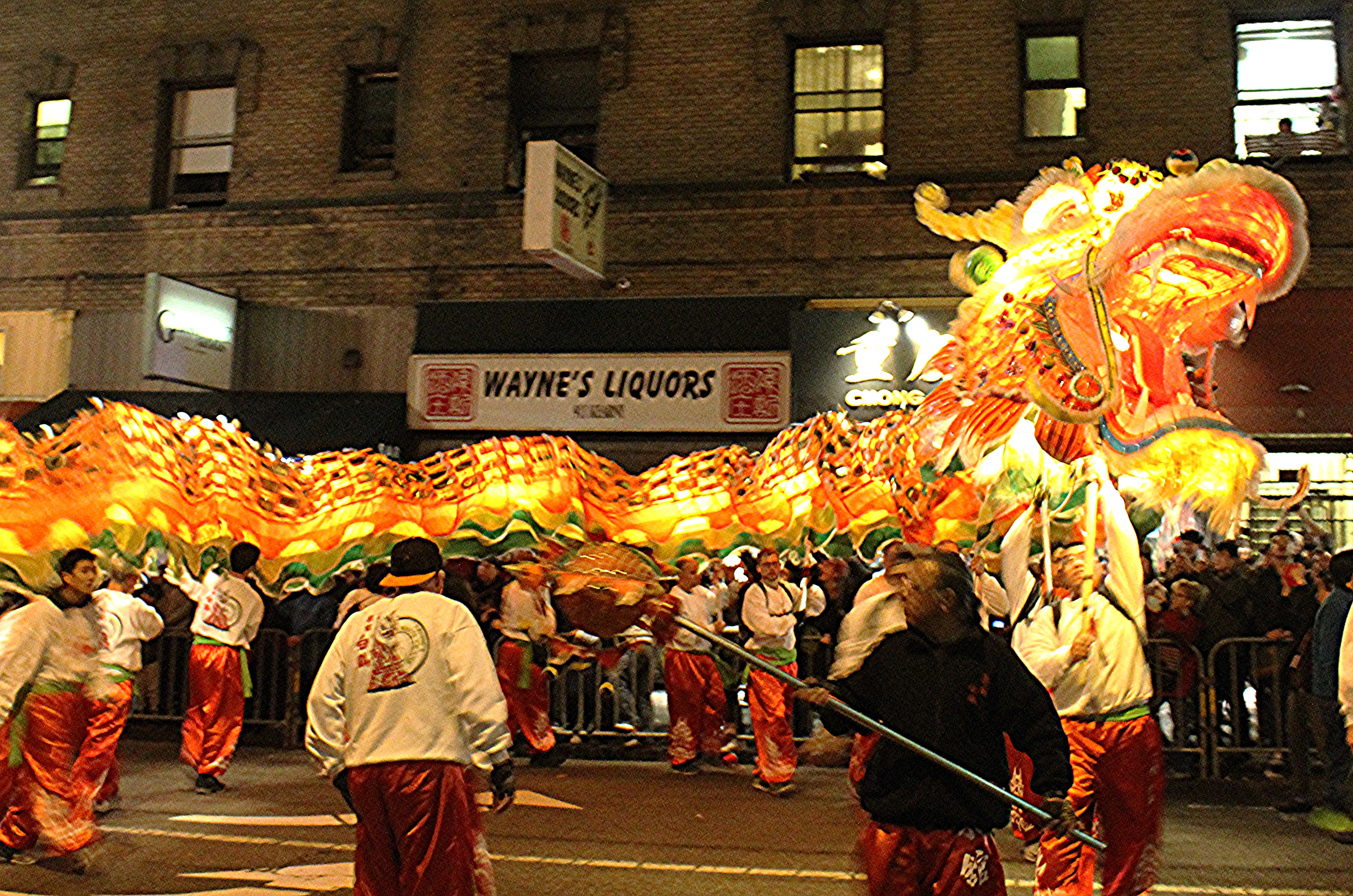
The Golden Dragon, near the finish on Kearny, marks the climax of the New Year Parade in 2017.

The two-week Chinese New Year Festival and Parade, sponsored by Southwest Airlines in recent years, includes two fairs, the Chinese New Year Flower Fair and Chinatown Community Street Fair, the Miss Chinatown USA pageant, and concludes with the parade. Miss Chinatown USA is traditionally present at the parade, as is a Golden Dragon which is more than 201 feet (61 m) long and manned inside by over 100 puppeteers. The Golden Dragon and 600,000 firecrackers conclude the parade. Over 100 groups participate in the parade, which is televised by KTVU and KTSF.

Other festival events include a Chinatown run and children's basketball games. Several San Francisco community groups such as the Chinatown YMCA, San Francisco Symphony, and Asian Art Museum hold festivities in Chinatown to celebrate the Chinese New Year as well.

=== CCHP Chinatown YMCA Chinese New Year Run ===
Approximately 1,700 racers and 250 volunteers participate in the annual Chinese New Year 5K and 10K run and walk which is held by the Chinatown YMCA. The primary sponsor with naming rights is the Chinese Community Health Plan (CCHP). After the race, participants receive awards, goodies, a T-shirt, refreshments, and can engage in family activities and sponsor booths. An award is given for the best dressed, according to the year's Chinese zodiac. Proceeds support community and wellness programs for youth and teens such as Chinatown YMCA's Community Center and Physical Education Program.

The route starts in the heart of Chinatown at Grant and Sacramento; the route continues through North Beach and returns via the Embarcadero. Runners in the 10K repeat the loop twice.

=== Chinese New Year Flower Market Fair ===
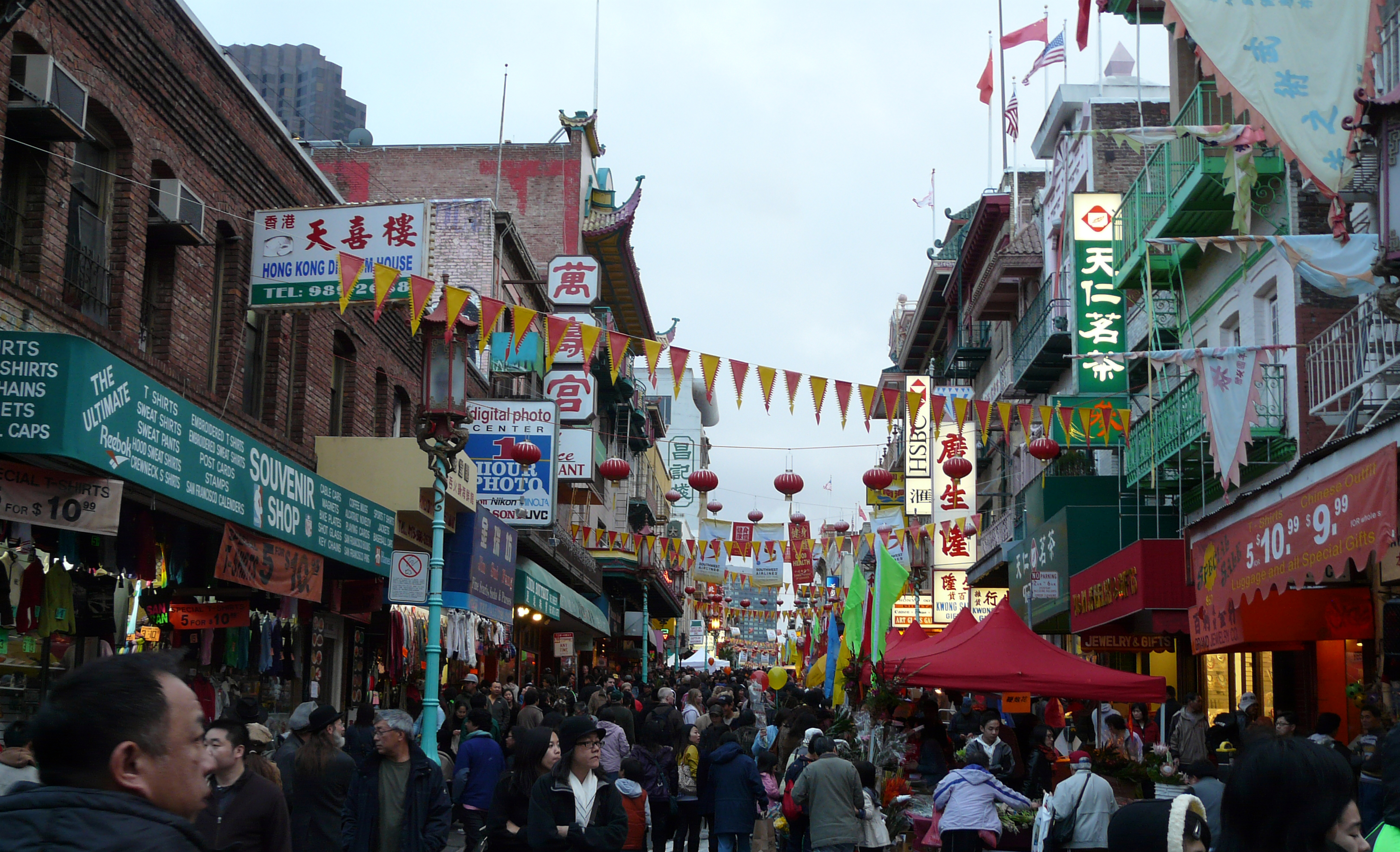
The Flower Market Fair for 2011 was held in late January; this view, south along Grant from the intersection with Jackson, shows typical crowds.

The weekend before Chinese New Year Day, a Lunar New Year Fair takes place in San Francisco's Chinatown. Vendors line the streets and sell goods including traditional flowers, plants, fruits and candies which people give as gifts to family and friends or use for house decorations. Throughout the streets, there are traditional Chinese performances, such as magic shows, acrobatics, folk dancing, and opera.

Great happiness is symbolized with fruits such as tangerines and oranges. Tangerines with undamaged leaves symbolize secure relationships, and for newlyweds, symbolizes the beginning of a family with children.

A Chinese candy box, called Tray of Togetherness or Harmony box, is a sectional tray which is used to serve bite-sized treats, such as candied melon, red melon seeds, candied coconut, and lotus seeds to wish guests a sweet new year.

Many Chinese people think it is important to have flowers and plants decorating their homes for the Chinese New Year because they represent growth. Plants that bloom on the day of the Chinese New Year symbolize prosperity for the year.

=== Chinatown Community Street Fair ===
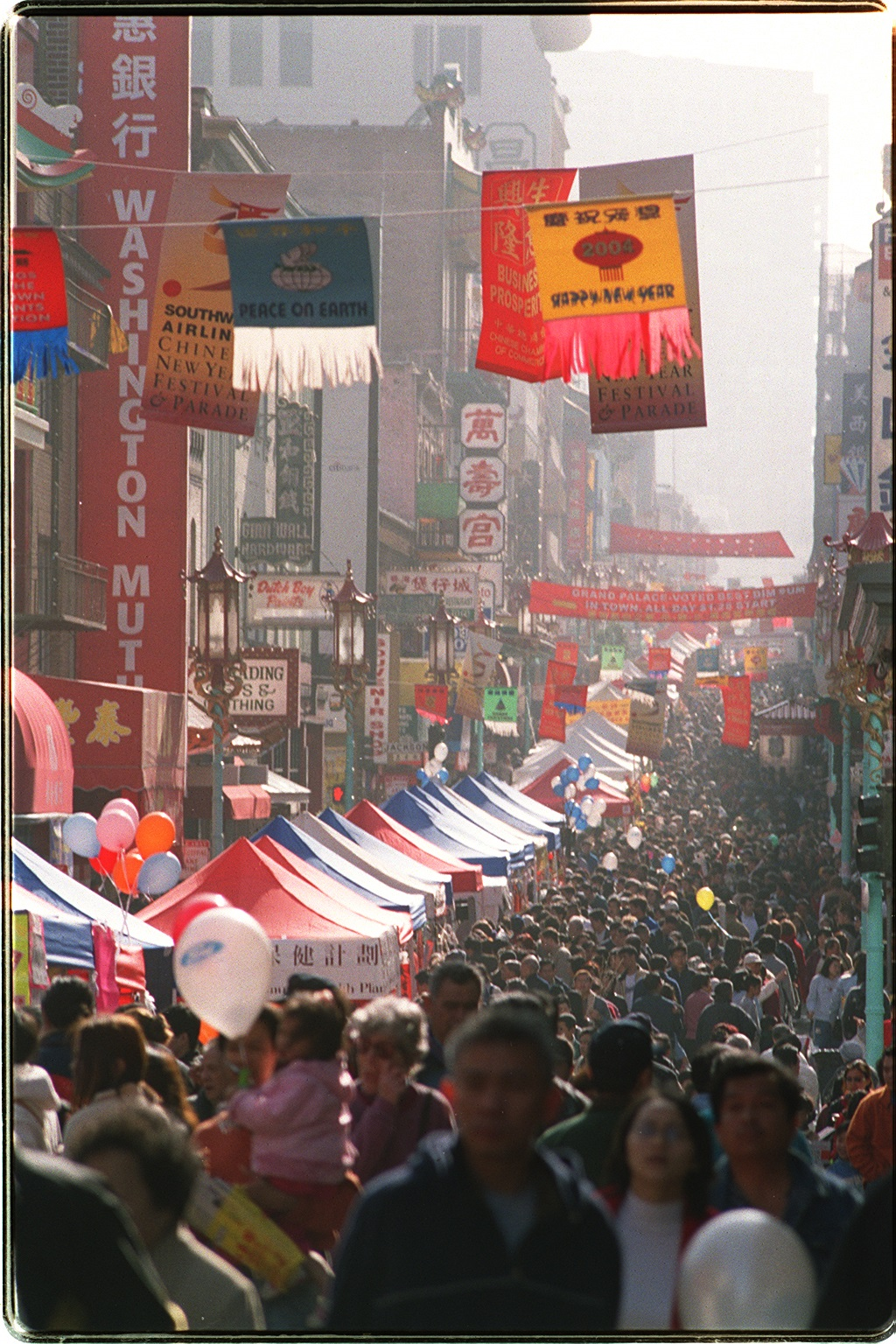
Crowded Grant Avenue

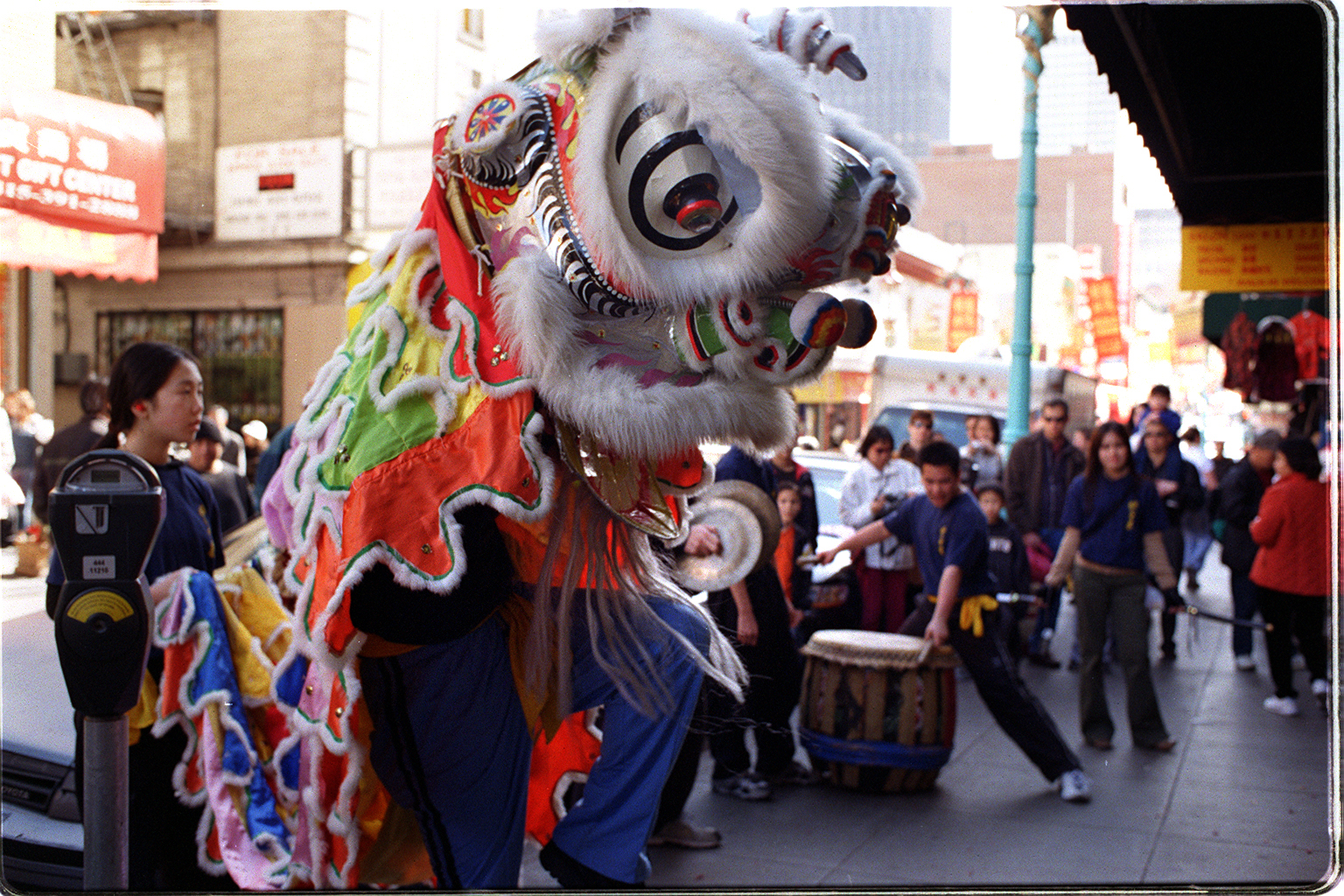
Lion dancers on Grant

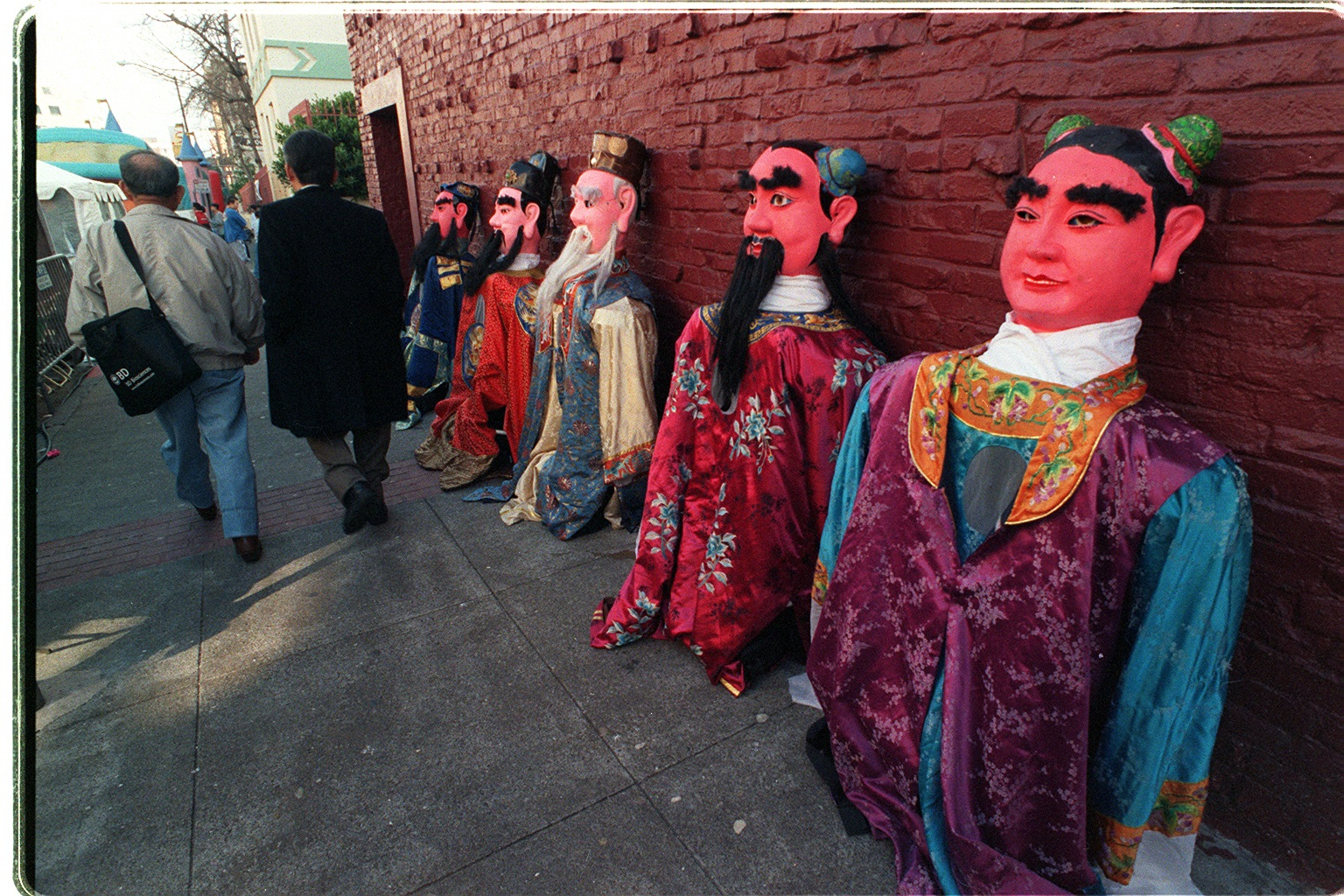
Giant puppets of the Eight Immortals along Pacific

Community Street Fair (Year of the Monkey, 2004); photographed by Nancy Wong

The two-day fair and its entertainment is planned by the San Francisco Chinese Chamber of Commerce and presents over 80 concessions and booths on the weekend that the Chinese New Year Parade is held. Entertainment includes folk dance, opera, drumming, family photos, giant puppets, lion dances, fine arts demonstrations, calligraphy, lantern-making, and kite-making. About 500,000 people attend the Chinatown Community Street Fair.

=== Miss Chinatown U.S.A. Pageant ===
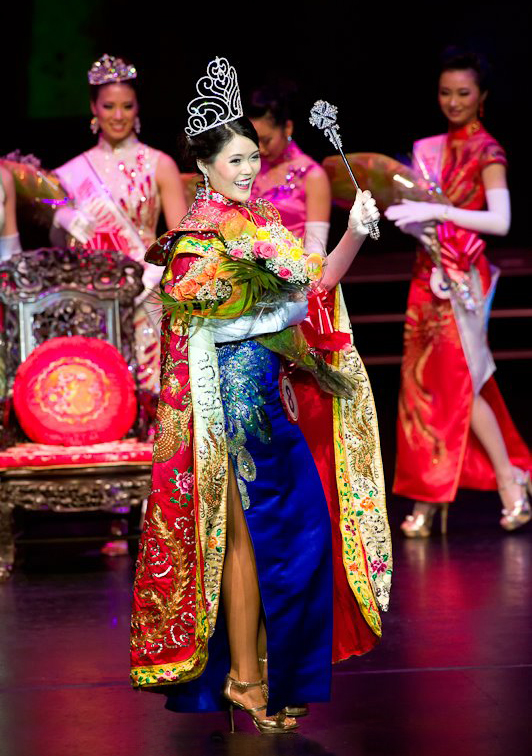
Steffi Hu, Miss Chinatown USA 2012

The Miss Chinatown U.S.A. Pageant is an annual pageant taking place in San Francisco, where Chinese American women compete to become Miss Chinatown USA, a Chinese community goodwill ambassador, along with winning prizes and scholarships. Miss Chinatown U.S.A. will be crowned with her court at the Caesars Entertainment Miss Chinatown U.S.A. Coronation Ball, where a dinner and dance will be held. The show includes quiz questions and competition in the areas of beauty, talent, and fashion. Other titles that are named in the pageant include Miss Chinese Chamber of Commerce/First Princess, Miss Talent, Miss San Francisco Chinatown, Second Princess, Third Princess, and Fourth Princess.

Beginning in 1953, the Chinese Chamber of Commerce held the first local San Francisco Miss Chinatown Pageant together with the Chinese New Year Festival to select a festival queen; prior festival queens include Pat Kan (1953, daughter of restaurateur Johnny Kan), Bernice Woong (1954), Carolyn Lim (1955), Estelle Dong (1956), and Ruby Kwong (1957). Once the pageant became more popular, the contest opened up to women throughout the U.S.A. The first Miss Chinatown pageant was held on February 15, 1958, at the Great China Theater. Judges included Chin Yang Lee, Joseph Fields, Richard Pollard, Mrs. K. L. Kwong, Mrs. John Yu, and Sally Lee Thompson.

=== Other community festival events ===
==== Asian Art Museum ====
The Asian Art Museum of San Francisco holds special events to celebrate the Chinese New Year. They offer Family Fun Days which include activities such as storytelling, gallery activities, and art projects themed to the year's Chinese zodiac animal. Families can learn about Chinese symbols, flowers, and plants through activities. The museum provides educational guides for children so that they can learn about the Lunar New Year, zodiac animals, and win prizes after completing the guide. During the museum's Lunar New Year Celebration event, museum-goers can watch schools come to perform Chinese dances and music, martial arts, a lion dance, and Chinese stories. People can create art projects, learn to walk on stilts, and learn a ribbon dance.

==== California Academy of Sciences ====
The California Academy of Sciences hosts a NightLife event for adults after regular operating hours on Thursdays; since at least 2014, one Thursday night during the Festival is themed for the Lunar New Year. A special lion dance performance by the Jing Mo Athletic Association took place on February 2, 2017.

==== Chinese Historical Society of America ====
Free admission to the Chinese Historical Society of America has been offered during the day of the annual parade. Dragon dancing, arts and crafts and other activities celebrating the traditions of the Chinese New Year were held.

==== Choy Sun Doe (財神到） ====
Starting in 2019, gold foil-wrapped chocolate coins were passed out in traditional lai see (red envelopes) to children for the one-day Choy Sun Doe event, celebrating the arrival of the god of wealth. Some also included money or a gift certificate.

==== Presidio Officer's Club ====
Families participated in making a pellet drum, used for thousands of years as part of traditional celebrations, using simple materials.

==== San Francisco Symphony Chinese New Year Celebration ====
Each year, the San Francisco Symphony celebrates Chinese New Year with a concert at Davies Symphony Hall. Those who purchase tickets can attend a Festival Reception before the concert at Davies Symphony Hall. This reception includes entertainment such as crafts, arts, lion dancing, calligraphy, food, and tea bars. A Chinese Dragon Dance marks the beginning of the concert and the San Francisco Symphony presents music from Eastern and Western music traditions, and music from Asian composers. After the concert, those who purchased dinner packages can attend the Imperial Dinner held at the Zellerbach Rehearsal Hall on 300 Franklin Street. The Orchestra's musical education programs, from over 75,00 school in the Bay Area, receive the proceeds from the Festival Reception and Imperial Dinner.

==== SF Beer Week ====
SF Beer Week included a dim sum beer brunch on February 11, 2017.

==== SF Chinese Chamber of Commerce/Southwest Airlines Basketball Jamboree ====
Every year about sixty children, three teams of girls and three teams of boys, from San Francisco Middle Schools and Chinatown North Beach community play six basketball games to celebrate Chinese New Year.

== Parade ==
Routes of the San Francisco Chinese New Year Parade
- 1953–1964
- 1966–1980
- 1981 and later

The parade is the climactic event, held at the close of festivities. Private celebrations of Chinese New Year began in 1851, and the first dragon was paraded in 1860. Scenes from the 1961 parade were used in the film Flower Drum Song. By 1974, a crowd estimated at 420,000 people watched the parade.

The modern parades that started in 1953 initially were routed along Grant Avenue from Market through Chinatown, although crowds were starting to overwhelm the narrow street by 1962. In 1965, the route was changed to bypass the narrow portion of Grant, detouring at Bush to Kearny. Community leaders in Chinatown were displeased, but city officials forced the route change to avoid traffic jams and a potential fire hazard. The route was updated again in 1981 to its present course, which includes a loop around Union Square. Despite the route changes, the start and finish have remained on Market and next to Portsmouth Square on Kearny, respectively, with the sole exception of 1965, when in addition to bypassing Grant, the start was also moved to Civic Center.

Because the parade finishes shortly after passing under the Dr. Rolland and Kathryn Lowe Community Bridge between Portsmouth Square and the Chinese Culture Center, in recent years, admission to the bridge is restricted to ticketed guests for a viewing party during the night of the parade.

=== Gum Lung ===
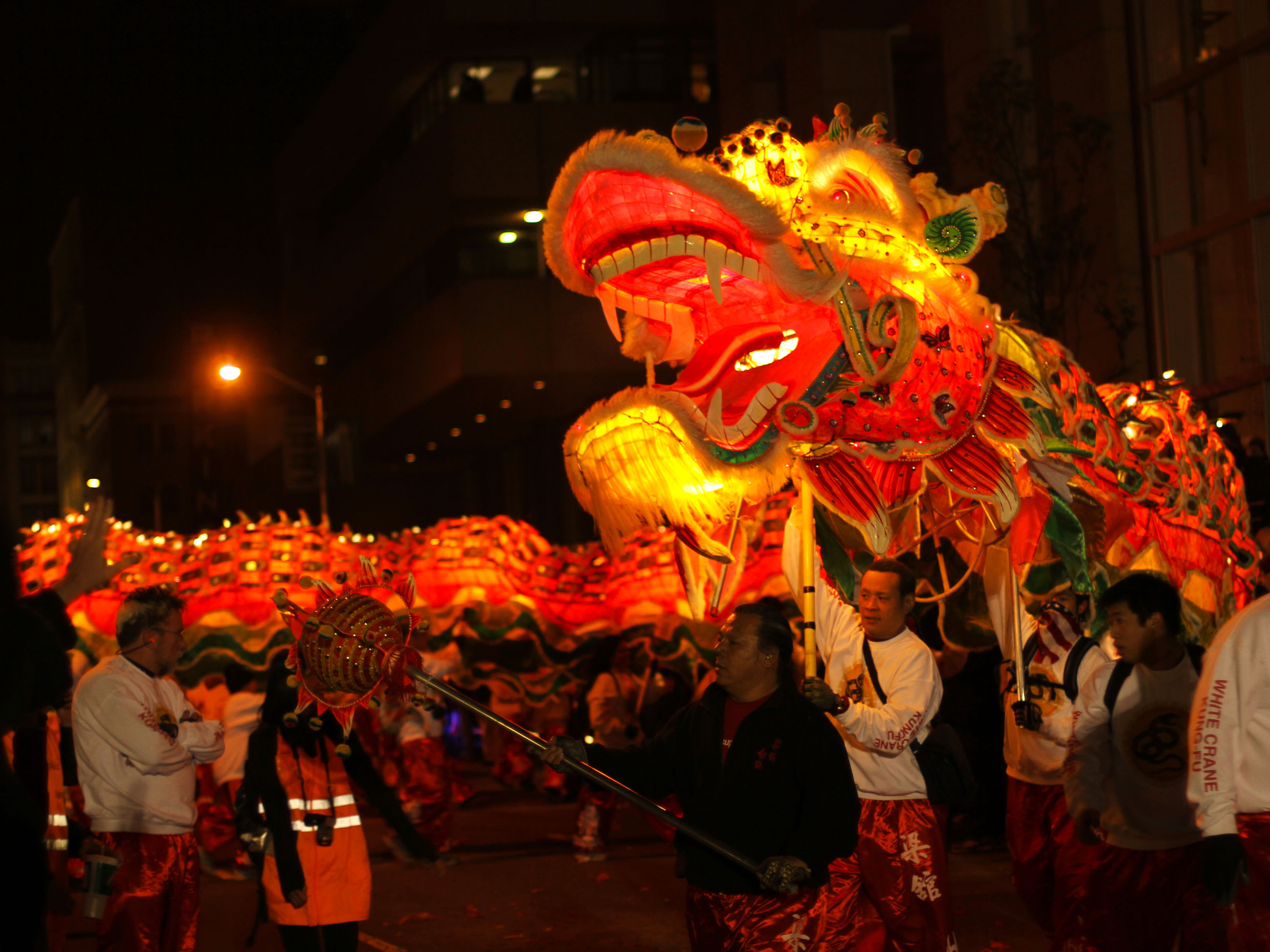
White Crane members dance with Gum Lung (2013)

The dragon dance by the Golden Dragon, Gum Lung (or Gàm Luhng, Chinese: 金龍; pinyin: Jīn Lóng; Jyutping: Gam1 Lung4), highlights the end of the parade. After the modern parades began in 1953, the first new Gum Lung was imported in 1957 from Hong Kong, billed as one city block or 150 feet (46 m) long. It was replaced in 1961 by a 125-foot (38 m) dragon, whose head weighed 75 pounds (34 kg). Another Gum Lung arrived in 1969, measuring 120 feet (37 m) long; that year, a smaller 60 ft (18 m) dragon was imported by Macy's and the parade featured two dragons for the first time. The 1961 dragon was made surplus and sold to Marysville, California, where it participated in that city's annual Bok Kai parade until 1984; it replaced Moo Lung, Marysville's earlier dragon, which had been loaned to Chinese communities across the United States from Seattle to New York, including two appearances in San Francisco (1885 and 1937).

A new Gum Lung, 150 feet (46 m) long, was used for the 1976 celebration to usher in the Year of the Dragon. In 2000, another new 201 ft (61 m) long dragon, made in Foshan and the longest to date, made its debut for the Year of the Dragon. A smaller 61-foot (19 m) dragon was also purchased in 2000, but was stored for many years until it was donated to the Southern Oregon Chinese Cultural Association, where it debuted in Jacksonville, Oregon, on February 9, 2019.

In 2015, the dragon, valued at $15,000, was 268 feet (82 m) long, had a head that weighs 30 pounds (14 kg), and was kept in motion for three hours during the parade. Another new dragon was introduced for the 2018 parade, now stretching to 288 feet (88 m) long.

=== Entrants ===
More than one hundred groups take part in the parade. The judges are located at the end of the parade, in the reviewing stands at Kearny and Columbus Avenue. There, the judges choose float and group participant winners.

- The Yau Kung Moon Kung Fu Association entry won the parade contest for 10 straight years.
- The International School of the Peninsula has entered and won numerous awards for their floats.
- Academy of Art University has won the Most Artistic Float Award every year since 2014.
- In 2017 Cirque du Soleil performed in the parade.
- More than one hundred members from the martial arts troupe Leung's White Crane Dragon and Lion Dance Association carry Gum Lung at the finish of the parade; thirty-five members are used in shifts.
