= Silicon Valley International School =

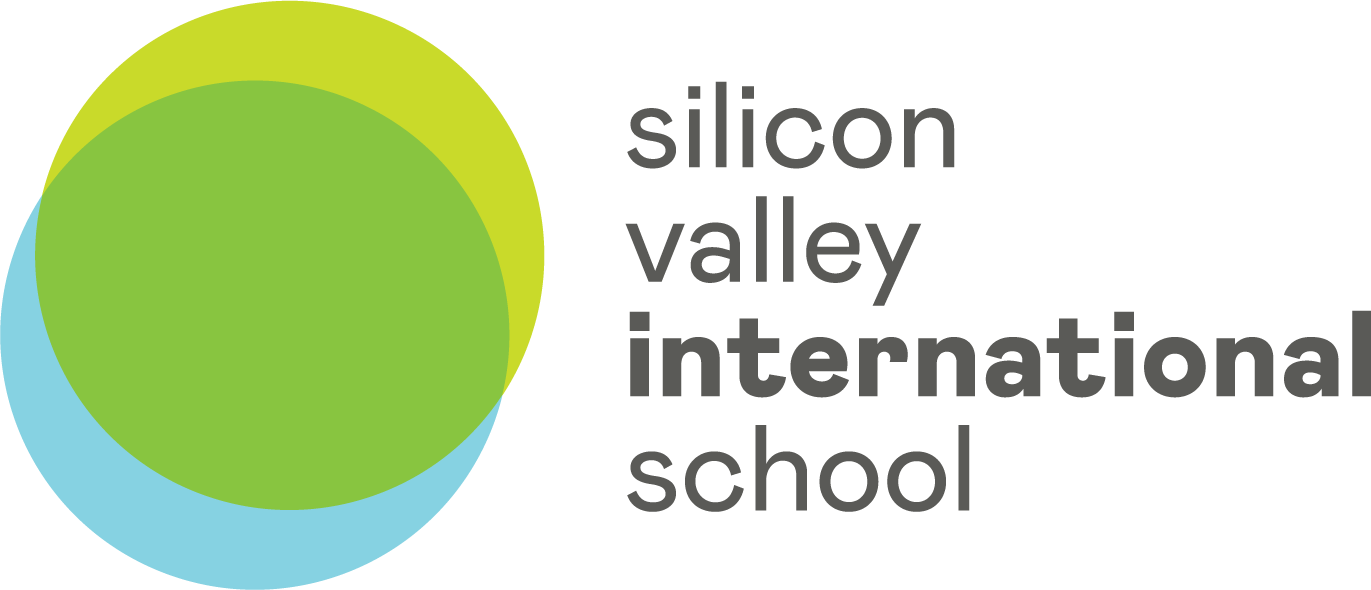

Location
- 151 Laura Lane; Silicon Valley; Palo Alto, Santa Clara County, CA 94303-3221; USA; 37°27′07″N 122°07′31″W

Information
- Former names: International School of the Peninsula (ISTP), Peninsula French-American School (PFAS), Alto International School (ALTO), German-American International School (GAIS)
- School type: Private Language Immersion
- Founded: 1978 (PFAS), 1988 (GAIS)
- Founder: Charlotte de Géry and Stephen Kispersky
- Status: Open
- Head of school: Barbara Greiner
- Grades: Preschool–12th Grade
- Age range: 3–18
- Enrollment: 843 (2026)
- Language: English, French, German, Mandarin Chinese
- Campus: Cohn Campus (Kindergarten–5th Grades), Clarke Campus (Additional Kindergarten), Willows Campus (Preschool–Pre-Kindergarten & 6th-12th Grades)
- Accreditations: International Baccalaureate, California Association of Independent Schools, Western Association of Schools and Colleges, French Ministry of National Education
- Website: siliconvalleyinternational.org

Silicon Valley International School, colloquially INTL (pronounced "international"), is a private grade day school located in Silicon Valley, with three campuses, two campuses in Palo Alto (formerly International School of the Peninsula, ISTP) and one in Menlo Park (formerly Alto International School).

Silicon Valley International School teaches in English language, Mandarin Chinese, French language and German language. INTL is an International Baccalaureate World School, and teaches the Primary Years Programme (PYP), the Middle Years Programme (MYP) and the Diploma Programme (DP).

The French AEFE designates this school as a French international school, as the École internationale de la Péninsule. (In 1982, the school received official accreditation from the French National Ministry of Education).The German program is recognized as a German Sprachdiplom Schule (DSD) offering the Deutsches Sprachdiplom der Kultusministerkonferenz for its students.

== History ==
On January 1, 2021, Silicon Valley International School (INTL) and Alto International School legally merged, united under the same name - Silicon Valley International School (INTL).

Silicon Valley International School (INTL) was first established as a French immersion school in 1979, and was named the Peninsula French-American School. Founded by Mme Charlotte de Géry with a small group of parents and friends, the school originally opened its doors to nine students. 10 years later, Alto International School (Alto) was founded by Stephen Kispersky in 1988 as the Deutsch-Amerikanische Schule San Francisco (DAS) as a place for children to learn in a German-English environment.

In 1996, the school began teaching in Mandarin Chinese program and middle school program and changed its name to International School of The Peninsula (ISTP). In 2019, ISTP gained authorization to offer the International Baccalaureate (IB) Primary Years Programme (PYP) and later was authorized to provide the Middle Years Programme (MYP). In September 2000, ISTP moved their elementary and middle school program into the Cohn Campus. As the culmination of a multi-year research and rebranding project, in 2020, ISTP's name was officially changed to Silicon Valley International School (INTL). When INTL and Alto finalized their merger at the end of 2020 and start of 2021, the two campuses became one school under the banner of INTL with Alto's campus becoming INTL's Willows Campus alongside of the INTL Cohn Campus. In 2026, INTL opened its Clarke Campus as an additional Kindergarten campus hosting three of its kindergarten class rooms.

ISTP has been in the annual San Francisco Chinese New Year Festival and Parade. The school has received awards in the Amateur Self-Built Float Category in previous years, winning either 1st or 2nd place.

== School leadership ==
INTL's Head of School is Barbara Greiner who began her tenure leading the school in the summer of 2022. Barbara previously served INTL for 21 years, including 11 as Middle School Principal. Barbara was integral to the development and planning for the successful execution of INTL's International Baccalaureate Middle Years Programme (MYP). Prior to returning to INTL, she served as Head of School for the French Immersion School of Washington in Bellevue.

In 2023, Greiner was awarded the Ordre des Palmes Académiques at the level of Chevalier from the French government. The award ceremony took place during a school-wide event on INTL's Cohn Campus in Palo Alto and was presented by Frédéric Jung, the Consul General of France in San Francisco.

Greiner took the reins from former Head of School Philippe Dietz, the longest tenured head in the school's history. Philippe spent 25 years as the Head of School at INTL overseeing change and growth at the school. He led the school's transition to becoming an International Baccalaureate World School and guided the merger between INTL and Alto.

== Accreditations ==
- California Association of Independent Schools (CAIS)
- Western Association of Schools and Colleges (WASC)
- French Ministry of Education
- Agency for French Teaching Abroad (AEFE)
- National Association of Independent School (NAIS)
- Independent Schools of the San Francisco Bay Area (ISSFBA)
- International Baccalaureate Organization (IBO)

== See also ==
- Agency for French Teaching Abroad (Agence pour l'enseignement français à l'étranger)
- Education in France
- American School of Paris - An American international school in France
