= Elizabeth Osborn =

American equestrian

Personal information
- Discipline: Vaulting
- Born: 1989 or 1990 (age 35–36)

Elizabeth Osborn (born 1989 or 1990) is a former equestrian vaulter who represented the United States in the Aachen World Equestrian games in 2006 in Aachen, Germany. In 2007, Osborn became the gold level reserve national champion, the American Vaulting Association high point champion, and the United States Equestrian Federation gold level zone champion.

In 2008 Osborn was rated as the top equestrian vaulter in the United States for her age group and in the same year she received the Vaulter of the year award. During the World equestrian games in Brno, Czech Republic she was part of the American team which received the Bronze medal. While competing at the USEF/AVA vaulting championship, she placed 2nd to Alicen Divita.

Osborn is a resident of Menlo Park, California. She graduated from the College of Wooster in Wooster, Ohio with a degree in biology in 2012.
