= National Register of Historic Places listings in San Mateo County, California =

Location of San Mateo County in California

This is a list of the National Register of Historic Places listings in San Mateo County, California.

This is intended to be a complete list of the properties and districts on the National Register of Historic Places in San Mateo County, California, United States. Latitude and longitude coordinates are provided for many National Register properties and districts; these locations may be seen together in an online map.

There are 65 properties and districts listed on the National Register in the county, including 2 National Historic Landmarks. Another property was once listed but has been removed.

This National Park Service list is complete through NPS recent listings posted November 6, 2026.

== Current listings ==
	Name on the Register	Image	Date listed	Location	City or town	Description
1	Archeological Site SMA-151		February 23, 1978 (#78000771)	Address Restricted	Princeton	Also known as U.C. Archaeological Research Facility. Native American historical site from 1749-1500 AD and 1499-1000 AD.
2	Barron-Latham-Hopkins Gate Lodge	Barron-Latham-Hopkins Gate Lodge	August 28, 1986 (#86001951)	555 Ravenswood Ave. 37°27′18″N 122°10′42″W	Menlo Park	
3	Bourn-Roth Estate	Bourn-Roth Estate	August 28, 1975 (#75000479)	3.7 mi. northwest of Woodside off Canada Rd. 37°28′13″N 122°18′39″W	Woodside	Also known as Filoli; built in 1915 by Willis Polk for mining magnate William Bourn, owner of the Empire Mine in Grass Valley, California
4	Nathanial Brittan Party House	Nathanial Brittan Party House	December 29, 1994 (#94001500)	125 Dale Ave. 37°30′02″N 122°16′15″W	San Carlos	
5	Burlingame Railroad Station	Burlingame Railroad Station	April 19, 1978 (#78000769)	Burlingame Ave. and California Dr. 37°34′49″N 122°20′38″W	Burlingame	
6	The Carolands	The Carolands	October 21, 1975 (#75000478)	565 Remillard Dr. 37°33′20″N 122°22′15″W	Hillsborough	1914 home of Harriet Pullman Carolan, daughter of George Pullman, inventor of the Pullman sleeping car; built by Willis Polk
7	Casa de Tableta	Casa de Tableta	August 14, 1973 (#73000447)	3915 Alpine Rd. 37°22′56″N 122°11′34″W	Portola Valley	Now Alpine Inn, formerly known as Rossotti's Saloon since the 1850s.
8	Church of the Nativity	Church of the Nativity	October 31, 1980 (#80000855)	210 Oak Grove Ave. 37°27′39″N 122°10′46″W	Menlo Park	
9	Ernest Coxhead House	Ernest Coxhead House	April 6, 2000 (#00000322)	37 E. Santa Inez Ave. 37°34′13″N 122°19′54″W	San Mateo	
10	Eugene J. de Sabla, Jr., Teahouse and Tea Garden	Eugene J. de Sabla, Jr., Teahouse and Tea Garden	July 30, 1992 (#92000965)	70 De Sabla Rd. 37°33′55″N 122°19′49″W	San Mateo	Circa 1907 Japanese farmhouse-style teahouse built for Eugene de Sabla, a co-founder of Pacific Gas and Electric Company
11	Dickerman Barn	Dickerman Barn	January 11, 1982 (#82002259)	Cabrillo Hwy. 37°07′09″N 122°18′21″W	Pescadero	
12	John Dielmann House	John Dielmann House	October 6, 2015 (#15000681)	1020 Main St. 37°29′01″N 122°13′34″W	Redwood City	
13	First Congregational Church of Pescadero	First Congregational Church of Pescadero	October 31, 1980 (#80000856)	San Gregorio St. 37°15′16″N 122°22′56″W	Pescadero	
14	Folger Estate Stable Historic District	Folger Estate Stable Historic District	April 16, 2004 (#04000328)	4040 Woodside Rd. 37°24′30″N 122°15′29″W	Woodside	
15	Golden Gate National Cemetery	Golden Gate National Cemetery	March 8, 2016 (#16000058)	1300 Sneath Ln. 37°38′07″N 122°25′52″W	San Bruno	
16	Mortimer Fleishhacker House	Mortimer Fleishhacker House	September 26, 1986 (#86002396)	329 Albion Avenue; 37°25′59″N 122°16′02″W	Woodside	An English style vacation home designed by Charles Sumner Greene circa.1911, also known as Green Gables.
17	Green Oaks Ranch House		November 21, 1976 (#76000526)	13 mi. S of Pescadero on CA 1; 37°08′04″N 122°18′38″W	Pescadero	also known as the Isaac Steele Ranch.
18	Arthur and Mona Hofmann House	Arthur and Mona Hofmann House	August 5, 1991 (#91000926)	1048 La Cuesta Rd. 37°33′03″N 122°20′53″W	Hillsborough	
19	Holbrook-Palmer Estate	Holbrook-Palmer Estate	September 26, 2016 (#16000663)	150 Watkins Ave. 37°27′49″N 122°11′29″W	Atherton	This estate is also known as "Elmwood".
20	Hotel St. Matthew	Hotel St. Matthew	January 23, 1998 (#97001663)	215-229 Second Ave. 37°33′58″N 122°19′26″W	San Mateo	
21	Howard-Ralston Eucalyptus Tree Rows	Howard-Ralston Eucalyptus Tree Rows	March 15, 2012 (#12000127)	El Camino Real, CA 82; 37°34′54″N 122°21′43″W	Burlingame	
22	Independence Hall	Independence Hall	August 3, 1978 (#78000772)	2955 Woodside Rd. 37°25′43″N 122°15′37″W	Woodside	1884 building that was located at 129 Albion Ave. when added to the National Register. It is now located adjacent to Woodside Town Hall at 2955 Woodside Rd.
23	James Johnston House	James Johnston House	May 9, 1973 (#73000446)	Higgins-Purisima Rd. 37°26′59″N 122°25′20″W	Half Moon Bay	
24	Kohl Mansion	Kohl Mansion	February 3, 1982 (#82002258)	2750 Adeline Dr. 37°34′57″N 122°22′55″W	Burlingame	
25	Lathrop House	Lathrop House	April 11, 1973 (#73000448)	701 Hamilton St. 37°29′16″N 122°13′48″W	Redwood City	
26	Martin Building	Martin Building	February 14, 1997 (#97000043)	220 Linden Ave. 37°39′18″N 122°24′32″W	South San Francisco	Now known as the Metropolitan Hotel, a residential hotel
27	Arthur C. and Judith Mathews House		December 7, 2021 (#100007224)	83 Wisteria Way; 37°28′19″N 122°10′29″W	Atherton	
28	Sam McDonald Park	Sam McDonald Park	September 29, 2026 (#100013445)	13435 Pescadero Creek Road; 37°17′50″N 122°15′54″W	Loma Mar vicinity	
29	Menlo Park Railroad Station	Menlo Park Railroad Station	October 1, 1974 (#74000556)	1100 Merrill St. 37°27′16″N 122°10′51″W	Menlo Park	
30	Methodist Episcopal Church at Half Moon Bay	Methodist Episcopal Church at Half Moon Bay	November 10, 1980 (#80000854)	777 Miramontes St. 37°27′46″N 122°25′37″W	Half Moon Bay	
31	Methodist Episcopal Church of Pescadero	Methodist Episcopal Church of Pescadero	March 10, 1982 (#82002260)	108 San Gregorio St. 37°15′05″N 122°22′54″W	Pescadero	
32	Robert Mills Dairy Barn	Robert Mills Dairy Barn	February 15, 1990 (#90000120)	Higgins Purissima Rd. 37°27′20″N 122°23′18″W	Half Moon Bay	
33	National Bank of San Mateo	National Bank of San Mateo	April 24, 1997 (#97000331)	164 S. B St. 37°34′00″N 122°19′20″W	San Mateo	
34	New Sequoia Theater Building	New Sequoia Theater Building	May 5, 1994 (#94000431)	2211-2235 Broadway; 37°29′11″N 122°13′47″W	Redwood City	
35	Newhall Estate	Newhall Estate	April 13, 2007 (#07000308)	1761 Manor Dr. 37°34′42″N 122°21′39″W	Hillsborough	
36	John Offerman House	John Offerman House	October 5, 2015 (#15000682)	1018 Main St. 37°29′02″N 122°13′34″W	Redwood City	
37	Our Lady of the Wayside	Our Lady of the Wayside	November 22, 1977 (#77000338)	930 Portola Rd. 37°23′02″N 122°13′58″W	Portola Valley	
38	Pigeon Point Lighthouse	Pigeon Point Lighthouse	March 8, 1977 (#77000337)	S of Pescadero at Pigeon Point off CA 1; 37°10′54″N 122°23′38″W	Pescadero	
39	Pilarcitos Creek Bridge	Pilarcitos Creek Bridge	April 7, 2014 (#14000110)	Main St. across Pilarcitos Creek; 37°27′58″N 122°25′44″W	Half Moon Bay	
40	Point Montara Light Station	Point Montara Light Station	September 3, 1991 (#91001094)	Jct. of 16th St. and CA 1; 37°32′13″N 122°31′05″W	Montara	
41	POLARIS (research vessel)		March 24, 2015 (#15000100)	597 Seaport Blvd. 37°30′25″N 122°12′43″W	Redwood City	
42	Portola Valley School	Portola Valley School	June 28, 1974 (#74000557)	775 Portola Rd. 37°22′56″N 122°13′40″W	Portola Valley	Later used as town hall.
43	Princeton Hotel	Princeton Hotel	January 31, 1979 (#79000543)	Capistrano Rd. and Prospect Way; 37°30′18″N 122°29′08″W	Princeton	
44	William C. Ralston House	William C. Ralston House	November 15, 1966 (#66000234)	College of Notre Dame campus 37°31′03″N 122°17′10″W	Belmont	
45	Redwood City Historic Commercial Buildings	Redwood City Historic Commercial Buildings	November 7, 1977 (#77000339)	Broadway and Main Sts. 37°29′12″N 122°13′35″W	Redwood City	
46	Redwood City Woman's Club	Redwood City Woman's Club	March 12, 2021 (#100006305)	149 Clinton St. 37°29′11″N 122°14′23″W	Redwood City	
47	San Francisco Bay Discovery Site	San Francisco Bay Discovery Site	May 23, 1968 (#68000022)	Sweeney Ridge; 4 mi. west of San Bruno via Skyline Dr. and Sneath Lane; 37°36′16″N 122°27′27″W	Pacifica	National Park Service brochure for Sweeney Ridge
48	San Gregorio House	San Gregorio House	May 6, 1977 (#77000341)	Old Stage Rd. 37°19′35″N 122°23′09″W	San Gregorio	
49	San Mateo County Courthouse	San Mateo County Courthouse	December 13, 1977 (#77000340)	Broadway; 37°29′13″N 122°13′47″W	Redwood City	
50	Sanchez Adobe Park	Sanchez Adobe Park	April 13, 1976 (#76000525)	Linda Mar Blvd., 1 mi. E of CA 1; 37°35′15″N 122°29′33″W	Pacifica	
51	Sequoia Union High School	Sequoia Union High School	April 7, 1995 (#95000389)	1201 Brewster Ave. 37°29′04″N 122°14′09″W	Redwood City	
52	William Adam Simmons House	William Adam Simmons House	August 18, 1992 (#92000995)	751 Kelly Ave. 37°27′49″N 122°25′38″W	Half Moon Bay	
53	South San Francisco Hillside Sign	South San Francisco Hillside Sign	July 11, 1996 (#96000761)	Sign Hill Park, N of Park Way; 37°39′49″N 122°25′08″W	South San Francisco	
54	Southern Pacific Depot	Southern Pacific Depot	September 1, 1978 (#78000770)	21 E. Millbrae Ave. 37°35′56″N 122°23′05″W	Millbrae	
55	Southern Pacific Depot	Southern Pacific Depot	September 20, 1984 (#84001191)	559 El Camino Real; 37°30′27″N 122°15′32″W	San Carlos	
56	Southern Pacific Railroad Bayshore Roundhouse	Southern Pacific Railroad Bayshore Roundhouse	March 26, 2010 (#10000113)	Junction of Industrial Way and Bayshore Ave. 37°42′04″N 122°24′31″W	Brisbane	Steam railroad engine roundhouse built between 1907 and 1910
57	Timby House		May 24, 2024 (#100007818)	621 Knoll Dr. 37°29′58″N 122°15′53″W	San Carlos	A 1941 modernist i.e. Modern_architecture interpretation of the California Ranch-style_house, designed by William Wurster, in collaboration with landscape architect Thomas Church (landscape architect).
58	Union Cemetery	Union Cemetery	August 25, 1983 (#83001237)	316 Woodside Rd. 37°28′26″N 122°13′23″W	Redwood City	
59	US Post Main Office-San Mateo	US Post Main Office-San Mateo	April 18, 1988 (#88000443)	210 S. Ellsworth Ave. 37°34′00″N 122°19′24″W	San Mateo	
60	Amelia Vollers House	Amelia Vollers House	January 27, 2015 (#14001205)	353 N. Claremont St. 37°34′27″N 122°19′46″W	San Mateo	
61	Watkins-Cartan House	Watkins-Cartan House	March 30, 1978 (#78000768)	98 Alejandra Ave. 37°27′13″N 122°11′49″W	Atherton	constructed around 1866 for Commodore James Watkins; originally listed as the Commodore James Watkins House; located at 25 Isabella Ave. when listed on the National Register; moved to 98 Alejandra Ave. in 1998
62	William A. Whifler House	William A. Whifler House	March 22, 2016 (#16000096)	1544 Drake Ave. 37°35′14″N 122°22′44″W	Burlingame	
63	Woodside Store	Woodside Store	July 18, 1985 (#85001563)	471 Kings Mountain Rd. 37°25′49″N 122°16′34″W	Woodside	
64	X-100	X-100	June 20, 2016 (#16000381)	1586 Lexington Ave. 37°31′30″N 122°21′12″W	San Mateo	
65	Yoshiko Yamanouchi House		December 26, 2023 (#100009653)	1007 East 5th Avenue; 37°34′07″N 122°18′53″W	San Mateo	

== Former listing ==
	Name on the Register	Image	Date listed	Date removed	Location	City or town	Description
1	Rock Magnetics Laboratory	Rock Magnetics Laboratory	1994 (#94001647)	May 5, 1999	345 Middlefield Rd.	Menlo Park	Originally designated a National Historic Landmark in 1994. Demolished in 1997.

== See also ==
- List of National Historic Landmarks in California
- National Register of Historic Places listings in California
- California Historical Landmarks in San Mateo County, California
