= Redwood City Historic Commercial Buildings =

Historic district in California, United States

- U.S. National Register of Historic Places
- U.S. Historic district
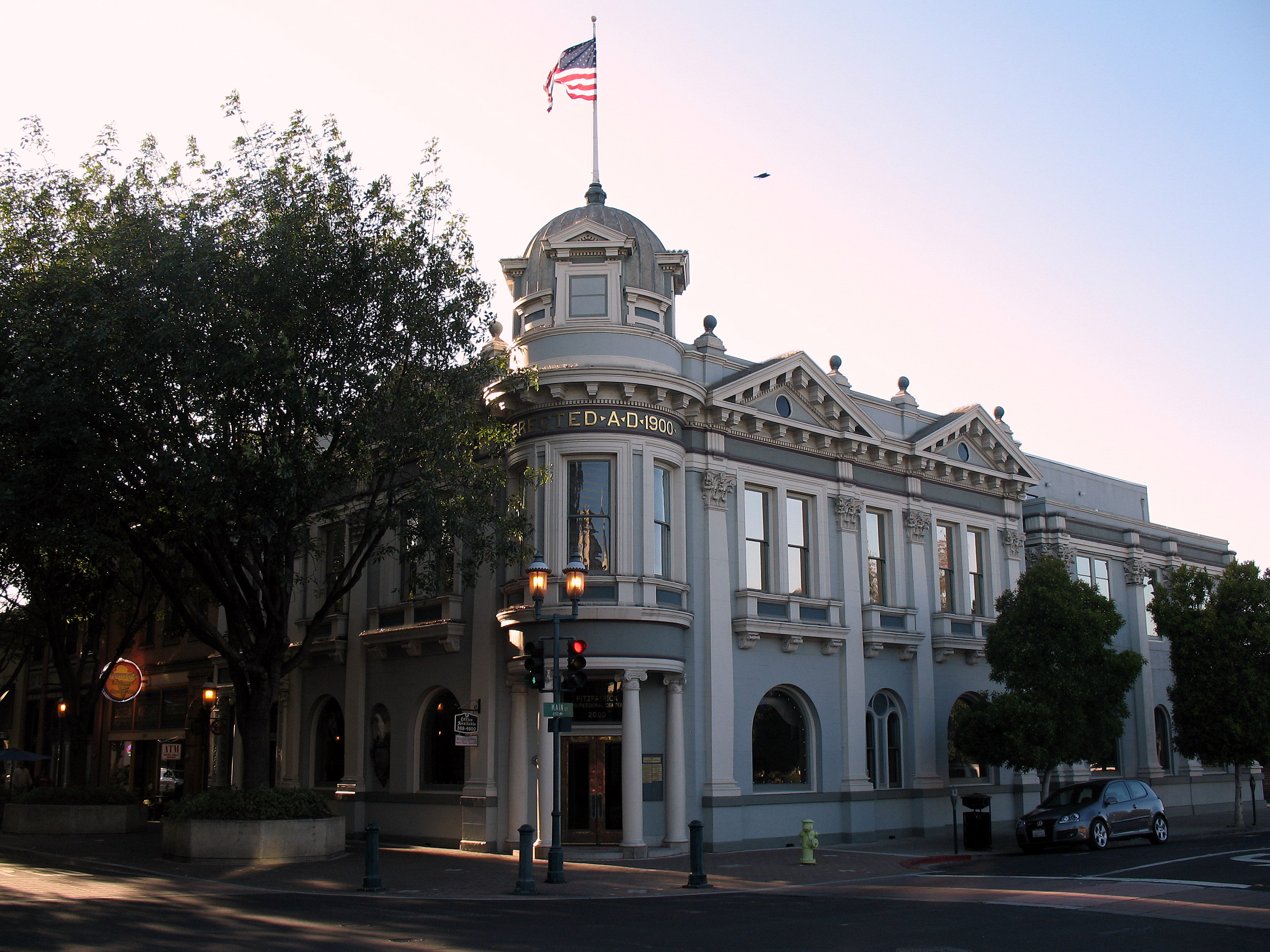
- Bank of San Mateo County

- Location within San Francisco Bay Area Location within California Location within the United States
- Location: Redwood City, California
- Coordinates: 37°29′12″N 122°13′35″W
- Area: 0.5 acres (0.20 ha)
- Built: 1859
- Built by: Multiple
- Architects: Alfred I. Coffey, A. Page Brown, others
- Architectural style: Classical Revival Renaissance Italianate
- NRHP reference No.: 77000339
- Added to NRHP: November 7, 1977

The Redwood City Historic Commercial Buildings is an historic district in Redwood City, California that comprises four buildings constructed from 1859-1912. These buildings include the Pioneer Store, the Bank of San Mateo County building, the Sequoia Hotel, and the Alhambra Theater.

== Pioneer Store ==
Built in 1859 by John Voger Diller, the Diller-Chamberlain General Store is the oldest commercial building in San Mateo County. The building was originally constructed as a general store and later a laundromat, then known as Quong Lee Laundry.

== Alhambra Theater ==
The theater opened in 1896 filling a void between the larger cities of San Jose and San Francisco. The theater hosted operas, plays, musical performances and had a bar that Wyatt Earp visited. In 1921 the Masonic Order purchased the building and utilized the space for their meetings. The building suffered extensive damage during a fire in 2001 but was able to be saved.

== Bank of San Mateo County ==
The Bank of San Mateo County building was completed in 1900, the second location for the First National Bank of San Mateo County, and survived the 1906 earthquake. The bank which was originally established in 1891 eventually merged with Wells Fargo Bank in the 1970s. The bank printed a variety of National Bank Notes during its operational years.

== Sequoia Hotel ==
The hotel was constructed in 1912, on the site of the former Eureka Brewery which burned down in October 1902. In 1916, it was claimed to be, "the finest hotel now in operation between San Francisco and San Jose." In the early 2000's it housed low-income residents rather than hotel guests. Today, the lobby of the Hotel Sequoia hosts the Center for Creativity and plans have been approved to renovate the building as a boutique hotel.

== Gallery ==
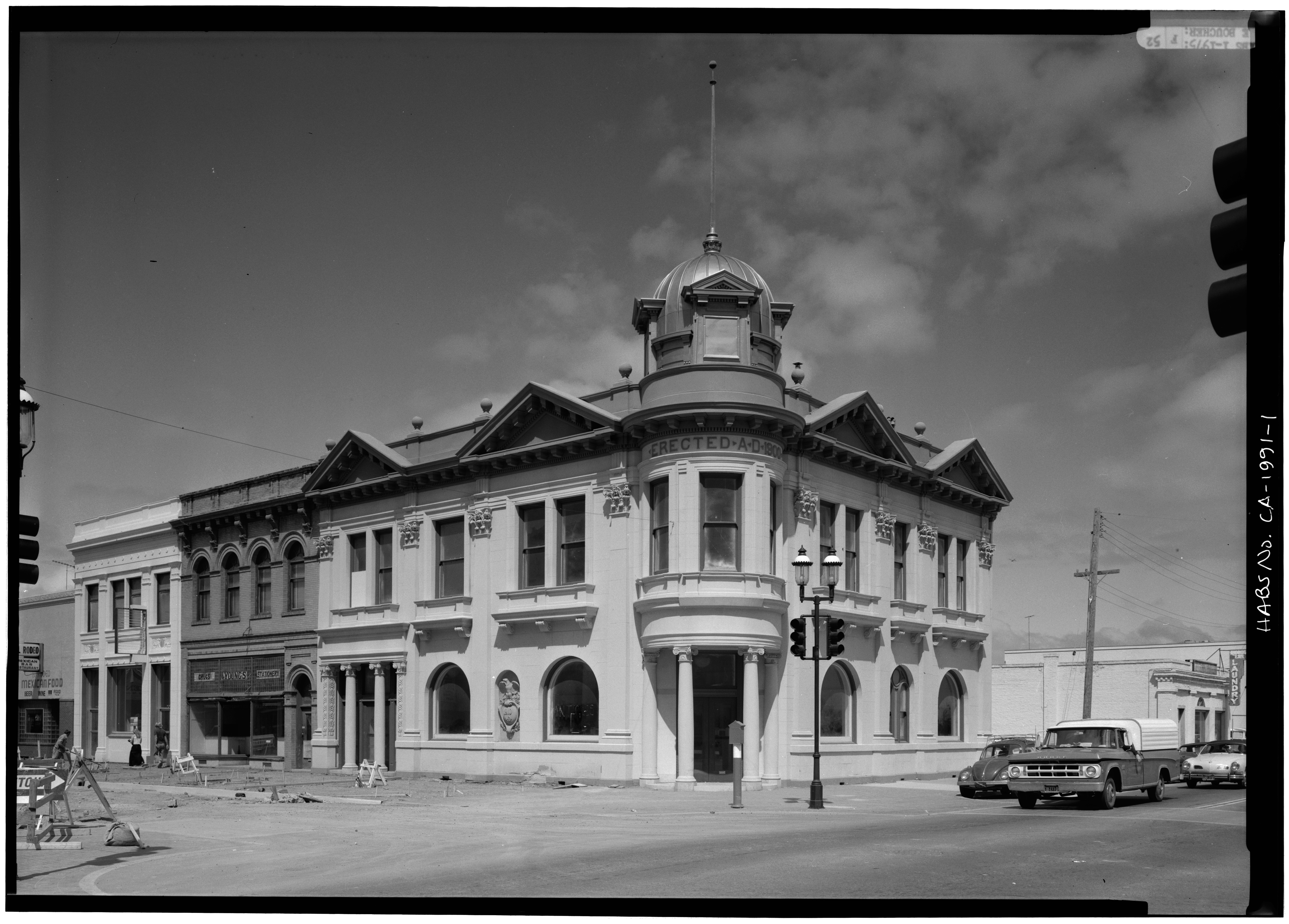
Bank of San Mateo County

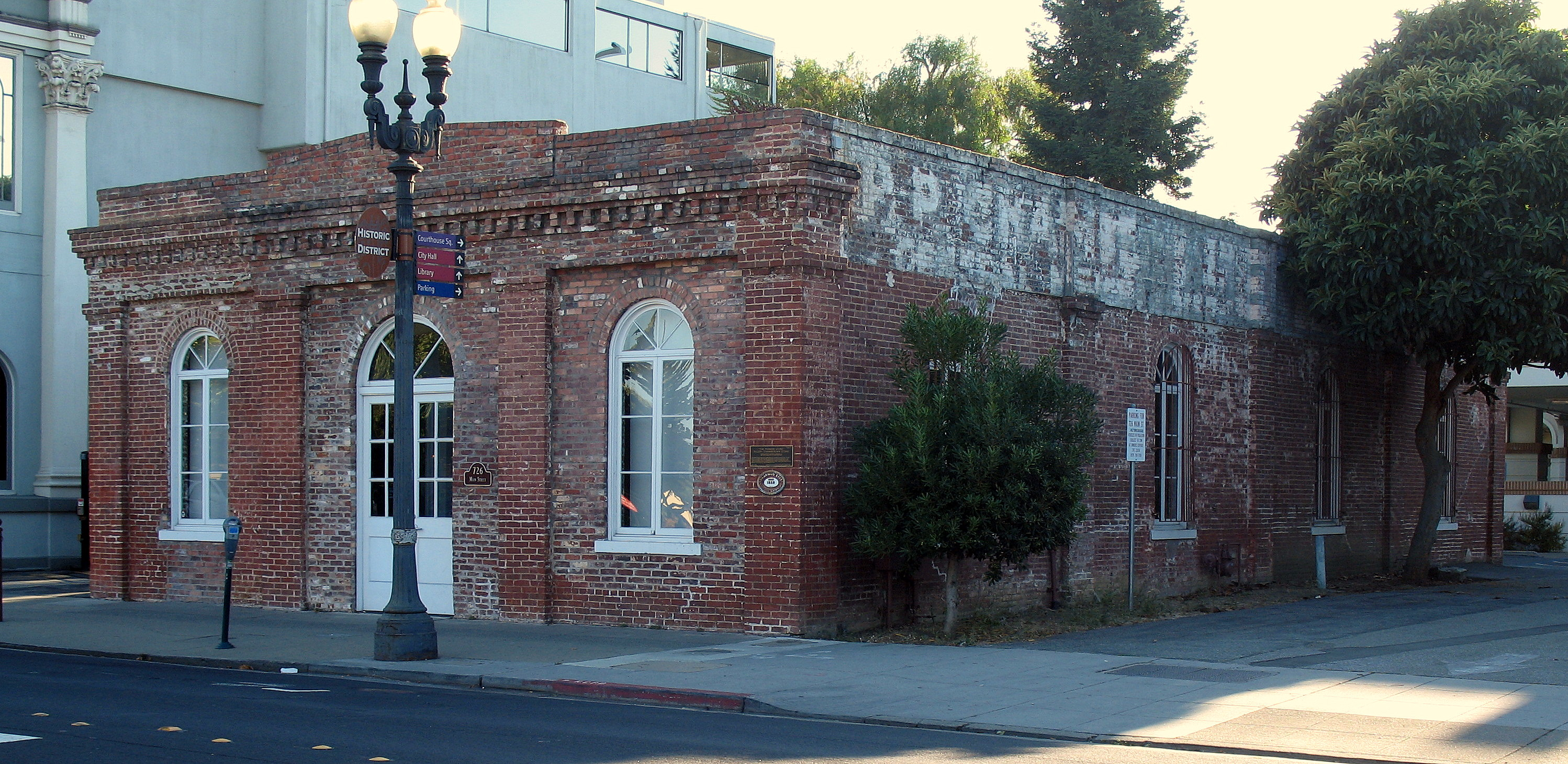
Pioneer Store

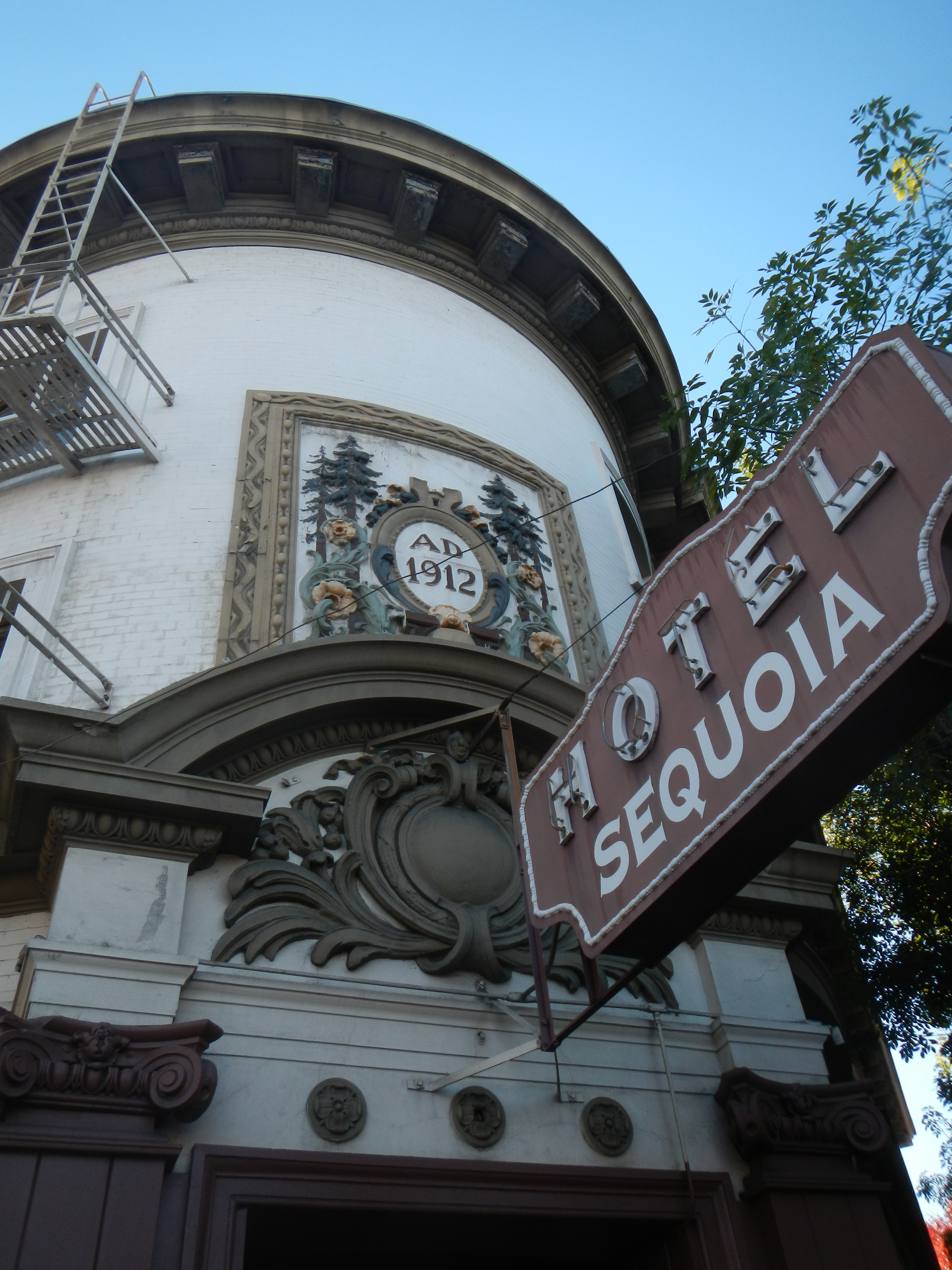
Sequoia Hotel Entrance

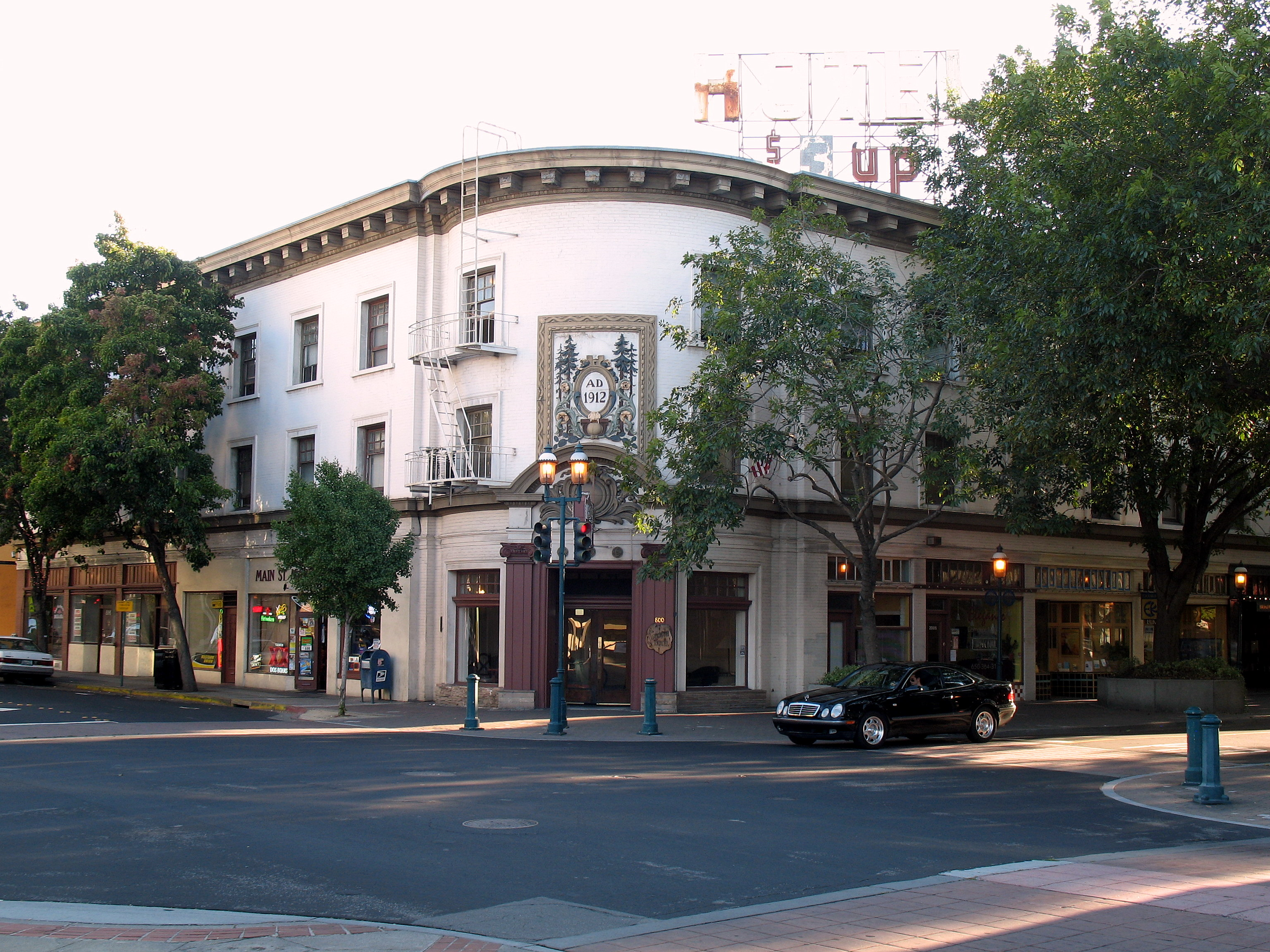
Sequoia Hotel

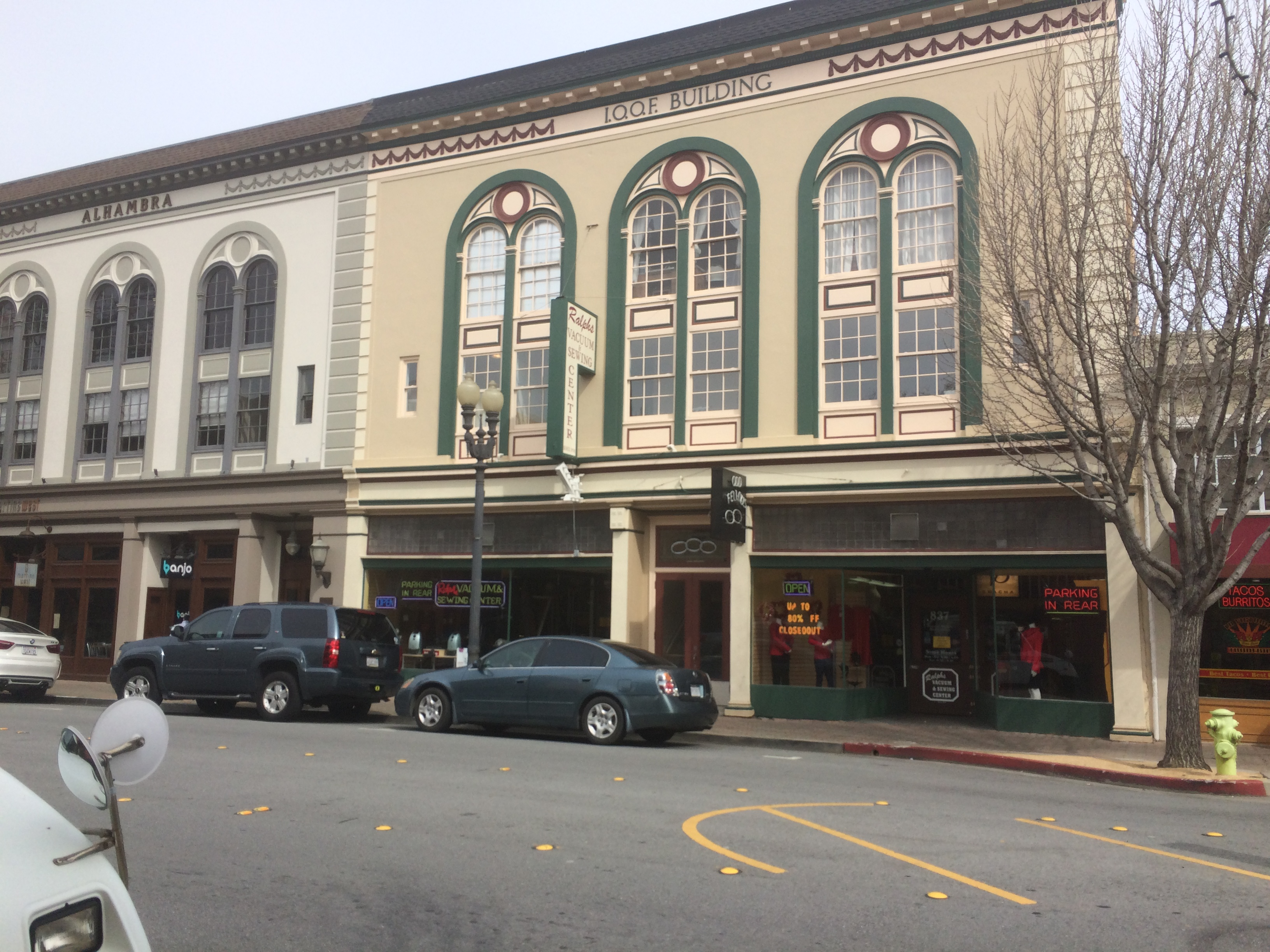
Alhambra Theater

== See also ==
- San Mateo County History Museum
- Lathrop House (Redwood City, California)
- National Register of Historic Places listings in San Mateo County, California
