= Don Cone =

American technician and researcher

- Born: October 17, 1926; Inglewood, California
- Died: April 7, 2011 (aged 84); Fountain Hills, Arizona
- Known for: Development of the Packet Radio Van
- Scientific career
- Institutions: SRI International

Virgil Donald Cone (October 17, 1926 – April 7, 2011) was a technician and later researcher at SRI International who developed and ran the Packet Radio Van that was used in the first ARPANET internetworked transmission.

== Early life and education ==
Cone dedicated his early life to the study of photography, in particular at the Fred Archer School of Photography under Fred R. Archer, who was a partner of Ansel Adams.

Cone served in the United States Army Air Corps for about a year near the end of World War II; he broke his wrist during basic training and was hospitalized in Coral Gables, Florida, and was reassigned as a medical photographer in that hospital. After he was discharged, he worked for a commercial photographer in Pasadena, California.

== Early career ==
Around 1950, Don joined the Jet Propulsion Laboratory in Pasadena, California as a technician in order to better financially support his family. In 1954, Don moved to Palo Alto to work as a technician for SRI; he initially worked in the Poulter Laboratory performing high-speed photography to support research into the use of explosives in oil exploration. He moved to the Communication and Propagation Lab, which split in 1961; he stayed in communications. In that lab, he did a significant amount of international travelling to build equipment and perform antenna measurements.

== Later career ==
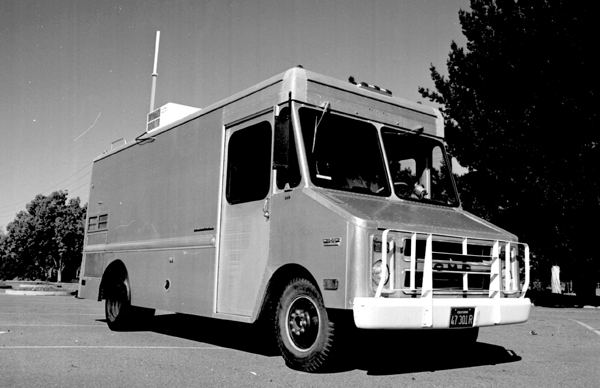
SRI's Packet Radio Van, designed by Don Cone

As part of the DARPA project to connect the disparate computers at its various contractors, there was a push to build a mobile packet radio laboratory to house a node of the early network, partly to simulate the needs of in-the-field military to connect to the network, and partly to test internetworking - connecting different communications protocols via the internet protocol suite.

The Packet Radio Van, designed by Don Cone, was a large GMC van and contained all of the equipment needed to be an ARPANET node via packet radio. Other equipment included a shielded generator, a DEC LSI-11 16-bit minicomputer, flexible equipment racks, and air conditioning. Due to his contributions around that time, Cone was promoted to Research Engineer.

Cone retired from SRI in the early 1990s, and focused on his love of photography; he embraced digital photography when that technology developed. He died of pancreatic and lung cancer on April 7, 2011.
