= Casa de Tableta =

- U.S. National Register of Historic Places
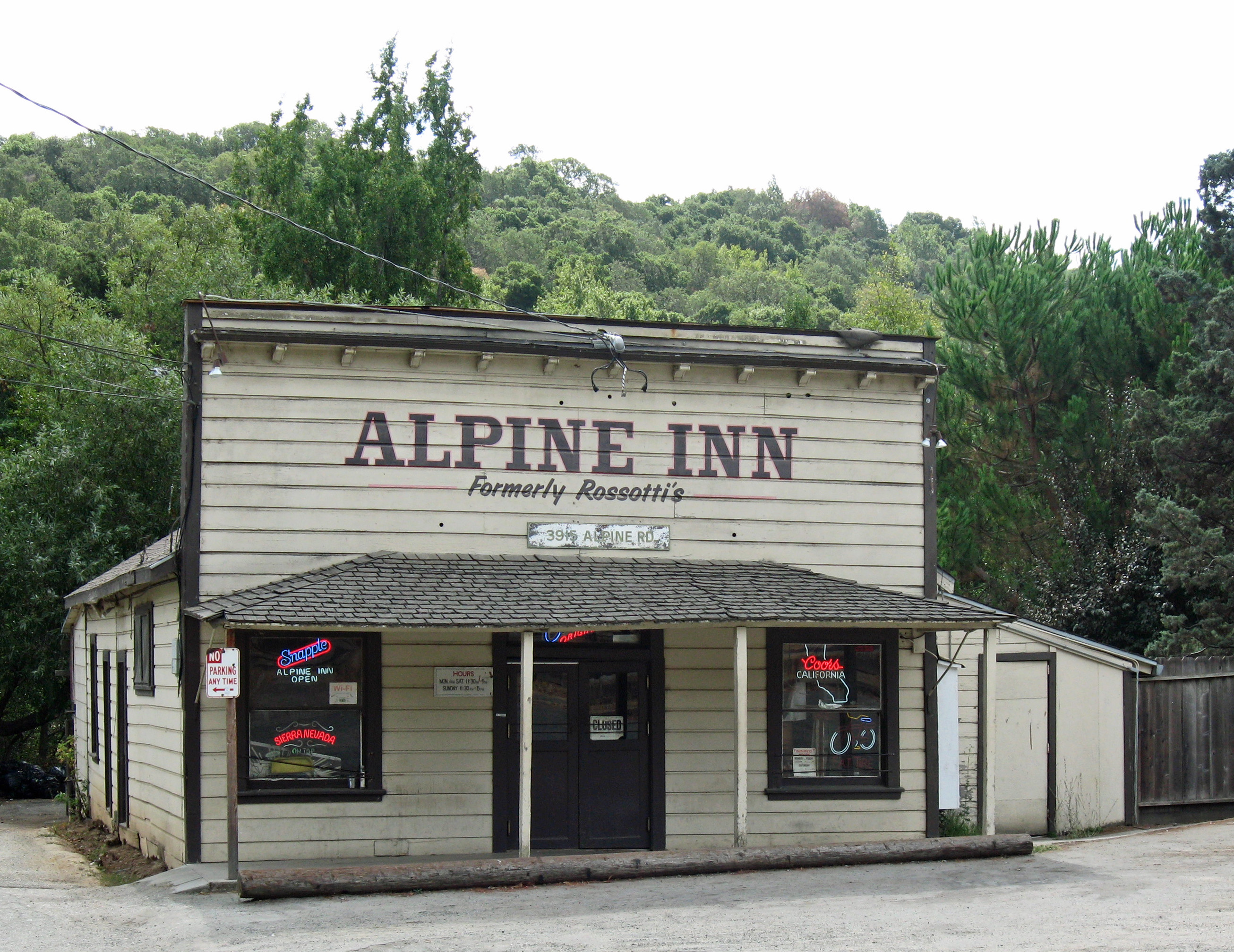

- Location within San Francisco Bay Area Location within California Location within the United States
- Location: 3915 Alpine Road, Portola Valley, California
- Coordinates: 37°22′56.8″N 122°11′37.7″W
- Built: c. 1851
- NRHP reference No.: 73000447
- Added to NRHP: 1973

Casa de Tableta, now known as the Alpine Inn, and formerly known as Rossotti's Saloon and Zott's, was built c.1851 in Portola Valley, California at the junction of Arastradero Road. It was listed as a California Historical Landmark in 1969 and on the National Register of Historic Places in 1973. As of 2020, it's the second oldest saloon in operation in the state of California.

Some additional historical names of the building include Félix Buelna's Casa de Tableta; Fernando's Store; Philpott's; Stanton's Saloon; Chapete's Place; The Wunder; and Schenkel's Picnic Park.

== History ==
=== Casa de Tableta ===
After the Mexican-American War ended in 1848, many Californios were pushed from their homes, and around this time Máximo Martínez of the Rancho Corte de Madera Mexican land grant gave his friend Félix Buelna ninety five acres of land. Casa de Tableta was built by Félix Buelna in the 1850s, the building was originally used as a meeting place and gambling hall for Mexican-born Californios. The building was strategically located at the junction of a well traveled Native American trail that had also used by the Californios and the Gold Rush-era settlers, and used in order to travel to San Jose and for logging and cattle purposes. The trail was called "Old Spanish Trail" and it connected the coastal town of Pescadero to the valley town of Palo Alto. The nearest large city was San Jose, which had recently outlawed Sunday gambling. Buelna encouraged his friends to come to Casa de Tableta to gamble and play Three-card Monte. In 1867, Buelna leased Casa de Tableta to two people, and then by 1868 he lost the property in a poker game to William Eccles Stanton, an Irish teamster.

=== The Wunder ===
Stanton leased the building to an Englishman named William Tate Philpott, which disrupted the Californios. By 1875, Stanton hired F. Rodriquez Crovello, a barkeep from the Azores, and the saloon gained the nickname, "Chapete's" or "Black Chapete" because he had a large black handlebar mustache. Stanton died in 1887, and a few years later Charles Schenkel took over the saloon and renamed it "The Wunder".

Construction in nearby areas developed and with the formation of Stanford University, there were students coming to patronize the saloon. Most of the towns nearby were "dry zones" during the late 1800s, but due to the rural location, this saloon thrived and was able to continue to serve alcohol.

Before 1911, Croatian immigrant and local orchard rancher Walter Jelich Sr. worked as a bartender.

=== From Schenkel's Picnic Park to Rossotti's Saloon ===
The sign that read, "The Wunder", which was crossed out during the prohibition (1920 to 1933), instead it was named "Schenkel's Picnic Park" featuring a large outdoor seating area that runs along Los Trancos Creek, however it still served alcohol. When prohibition ended in 1933, the business was sold to Enrico Rossotti and it was renamed "Rossotti's Saloon" and food service was introduced.

By 1956, the ownership had changed and it was formally renamed "Alpine Inn Beer Garden" however many still called it "Rossotti's" or "Zott's".

In 1969, a California Historical Landmark number 825 historical marker was added to the site by the State Department of Parks and Recreation in cooperation with the town of Portola Valley.

In 1976, a group of Stanford Research Institute (SRI International) scientists made history and sent an electronic message from a computer, while sitting in the picnic area of the saloon. The first two-network TCP/IP transmission was between a specialized SRI van and UCLA (University of California, Los Angeles) via ARPANET on August 27, 1976; the van was parked next to the Alpine Inn and wires were run to one of the picnic tables.

== Present day ==
In December 2018, the saloon changed owners and underwent a remodel, changes to the menu, and introduced an outdoor tent in the picnic area during the winter season.

The building is located near many present day scenic biking routes and hiking trails, and it is still popular with people affiliated with Stanford University.

== See also ==
- California Historical Landmarks in San Mateo County, California
- National Register of Historic Places listings in San Mateo County, California
