= Packet Radio Van =

Testbed for ARPANET internetworking

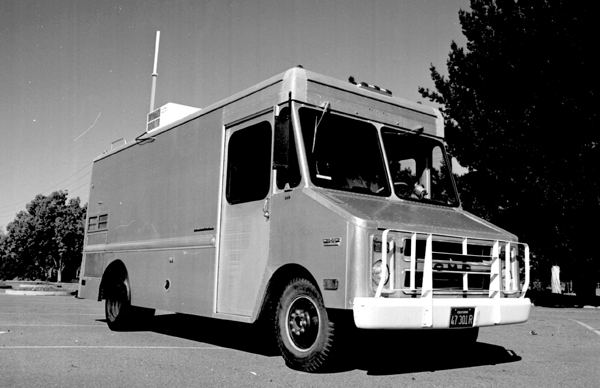
SRI's Packet Radio Van

The Packet Radio Van was a GMC Value-Van refitted by Don Cone at SRI International, and equipped with technology that was used in the first two-way internetworked transmission on August 27, 1976, and the first three-way internetworked transmission on November 22, 1977, the latter of which is considered the start of the Internet.

== Background ==
The van was created as part of DARPA's PRNET project, which developed the world's first mobile ad hoc network. It was a mobile packet radio laboratory that housed one of the PRNET radio nodes, to simulate the needs of in-the-field military to connect to the network. As DARPA further wished to connect the disparate computers at its various contractors, and indeed globally, there was a push to test internetworking - connecting different communications protocols via the Internet protocol suite. The van played a unique role in the very first demonstration of the Internet.

== Equipment ==
The GMC van, designed by Don Cone, resembled a bread van and contained all of the equipment needed to be an ARPANET node via packet radio, including a Digital Equipment Corporation DEC LSI-11 16-bit minicomputer. Other equipment included a shielded generator, flexible equipment racks, and air conditioning. Due to his contributions around that time, Cone was promoted to Research Engineer.

== Transmissions ==
The first two-network TCP/IP transmission was between the van and ARPANET on August 27, 1976; the van was parked next to Rossotti's (since 1956, officially the "Alpine Inn"), a well-known Portola Valley, California biker bar, and wires were run to one of the picnic tables. The location was chosen as to be far enough from SRI in Menlo Park, California to be "remote" but close enough to have good radio contact.

The first true Internet transmission occurred on November 22, 1977, when SRI originated the first connection between three disparate networks. Data flowed seamlessly through the mobile van at SRI in Menlo Park, California and the University of Southern California in Los Angeles via London, England, across three types of networks: packet radio, satellite, and the ARPANET.

The van was also the site of the first experiments (primarily by Earl Craighill and Tom Magill) with Voice over IP through ARPA's Network Speech Compression Program around 1977 to 1978. They focused on how to compress speech such that it still sounded "natural" and arrived in a timely manner. The phone in the van was a Mickey Mouse phone.

== Legacy ==
The van was parked unused for a decade in a back lot of the SRI campus until the planning of a celebration of the 20th anniversary of the Internet in 1997 at the Internet Supercomputer Conference in San Jose, California. SRI employees Don Alves and Don Nielson cleaned, licensed, and replenished the van's radio and Internet equipment. The van was exhibited on the convention floor and was popular with attendees. SRI donated the van to the Computer History Museum to prevent further deterioration.

In 2007, the Computer History Museum presented a 30th anniversary celebration of this demonstration, which included several participants of the 1977 event.

== See also ==
- History of the Internet: TCP/IP
