= Portola Valley School =

- U.S. National Register of Historic Places
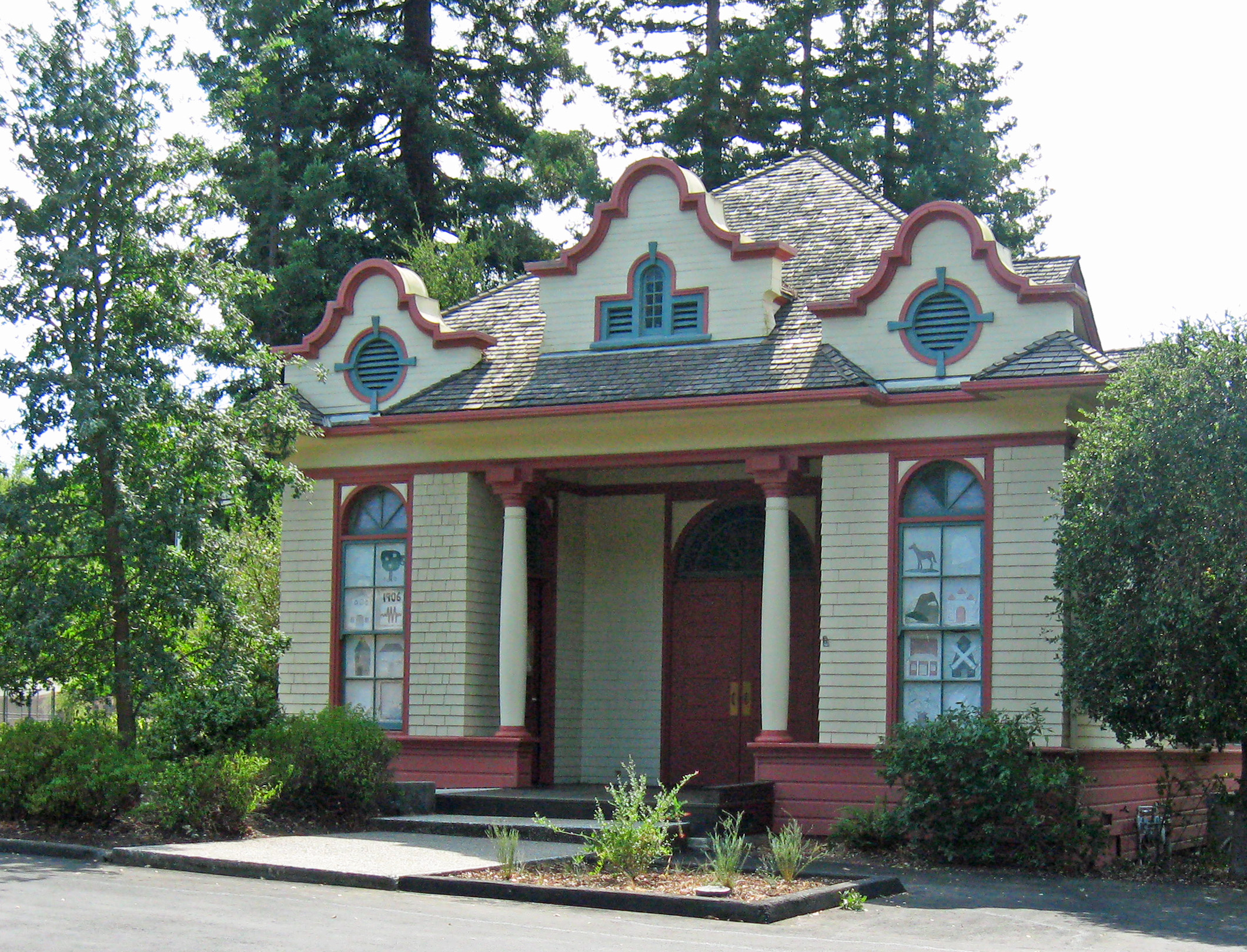

- Location within San Francisco Bay Area Location within California Location within the United States
- Location: 775 Portola Road, Portola Valley, California
- Coordinates: 37°22′55″N 122°13′44″W
- Built: 1909
- Architect: LeBaron R. Olive
- Architectural style: Mission Revival
- NRHP reference No.: 74000557
- Added to NRHP: June 29, 1974

The Portola Valley School is a one-room schoolhouse that sits at 775 Portola Road in Portola Valley, California. It was added to the National Register of Historic Places in 1974. It is currently used for Portola Valley town-hall meetings.

== History ==
It was designed in 1909 by LeBaron R. Olive and is a rare, surviving example of a school in Mission Revival style. This building was built with wood construction and use of shingles.

== Gallery ==
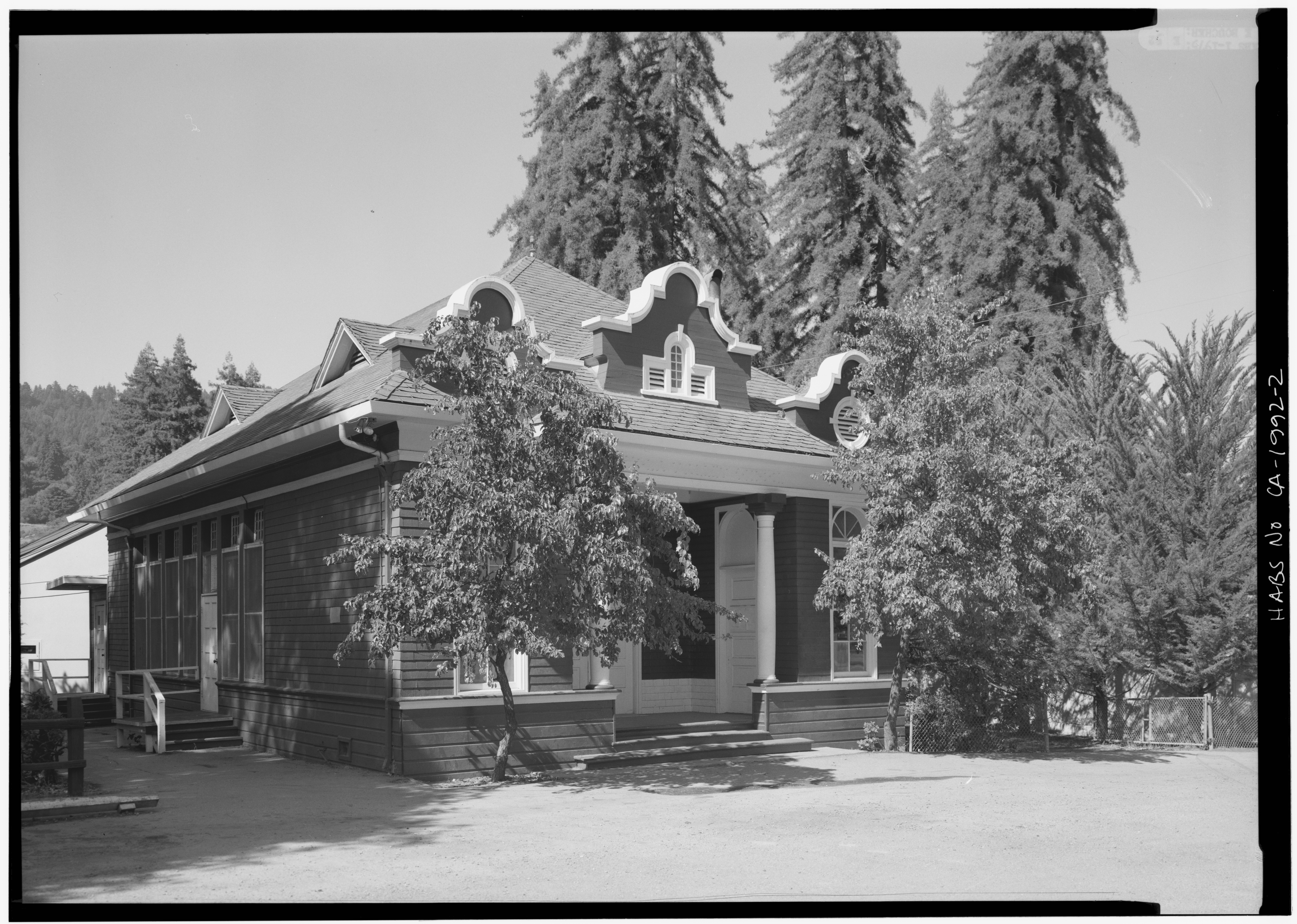

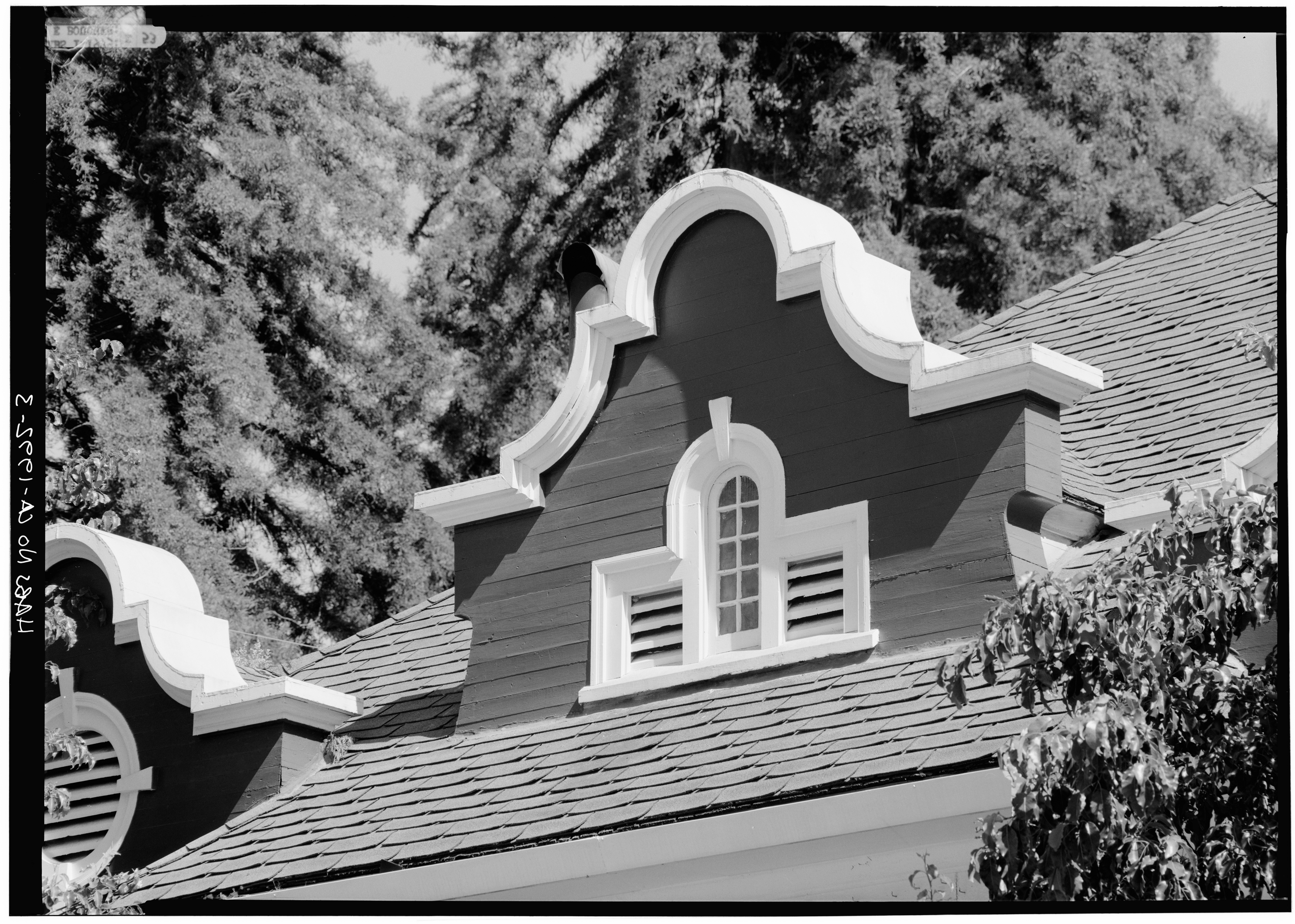
Detail of the center gable

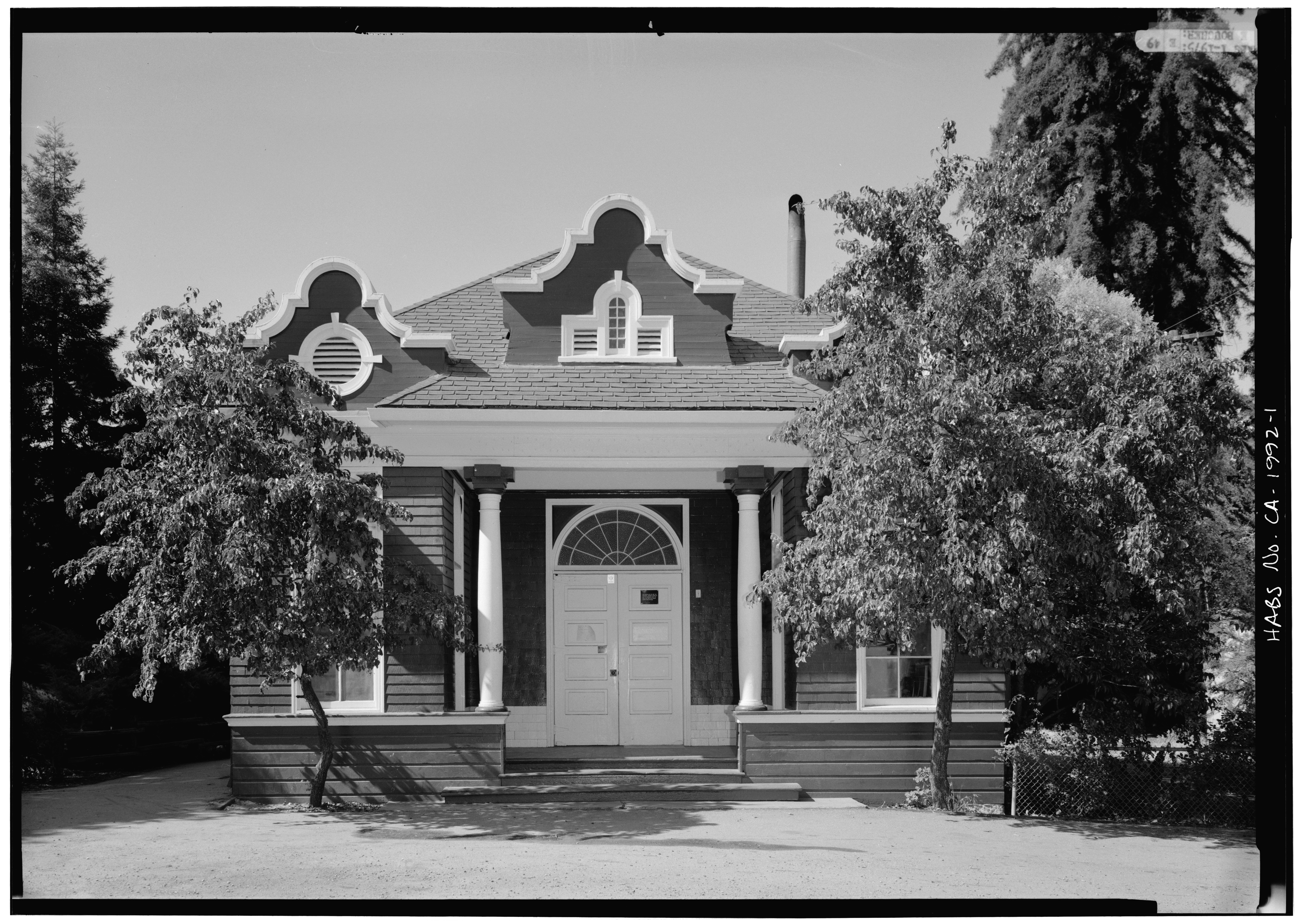

== See also ==
- National Register of Historic Places listings in San Mateo County, California
