= Thomas Poulter =

American physicist and Antarctic explorer (1897–1978)

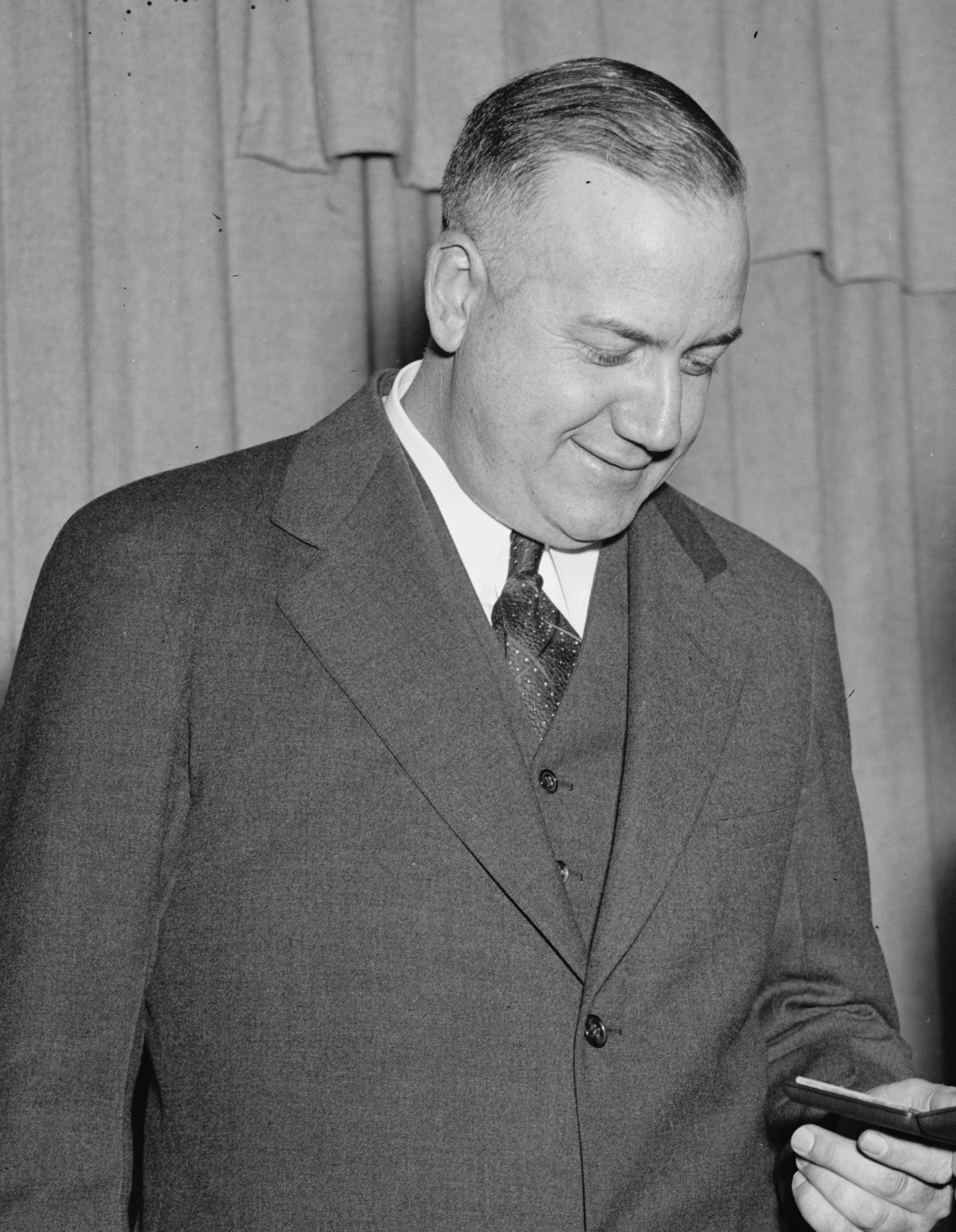
- Poulter admiring his special gold medal, awarded by the National Geographic Society in April 1937
- Born: March 3, 1897; Salem, Iowa
- Died: June 4, 1978 (aged 81); Menlo Park, California
- Education: Iowa Wesleyan College (BS); University of Chicago (PhD)
- Known for: Antarctic exploration
- Scientific career
- Institutions: Iowa Wesleyan College; Illinois Institute of Technology; SRI International

Thomas Charles Poulter (March 3, 1897 – June 4, 1978) was an American scientist and antarctic explorer who worked at the Armour Institute of Technology and SRI International, where he was an associate director.

== Early career ==
Poulter taught physics while attending high school (1914-1918), joined the U.S. Navy in 1918 and returned to school in 1921. Poulter received his B.S. from Iowa Wesleyan College (IWC) in 1923; took a position as head of the chemistry division at IWC (1925); and served as head of the math, physics and astronomy divisions with "great creativity and much success" while attending graduate school at the University of Chicago (Ph. D., 1933).

While he was a physics professor at IWS he recognized James Van Allen as a student and put him to work, at 35 cents an hour, preparing seismic and magnetic equipment for the Antarctic Expedition.

He was second in command on the Second Byrd Antarctic Mission to the South Pole with Richard E. Byrd. The Poulter Glacier was named after him by Admiral Byrd. Byrd credited him with saving his life as the expedition leader approached death from carbon monoxide poisoning.

After his first expedition he became the scientific director of the Armour Research Foundation at the Armour Institute of Technology (later Illinois Institute of Technology) where he developed the Antarctic Snow Cruiser (a.k.a. "Penguin 1"). This device was built for and taken along on his second expedition with Admiral Byrd in 1939.

== Later career ==
In 1948 he joined the Stanford Research Institute (SRI) in Menlo Park, California, where he remained until his death in 1978. While at SRI he did research involving dynamic phenomena including explosives, weather and eventually Biosonar. Poulter devised seismic pattern shooting in the 1950s, and according to W. Harry Mayne, Poulter's "method called for a pattern of explosive charges to be mounted on poles (usually 5-6 ft above the surface of the ground, which prevented any significant environmental damage)." He became interested in seals after visiting the elephant seal colony at Año Nuevo Island off the coast of California in 1961. The seal colony there included elephant seals, sea lions harbor seals and many others. He began studying the seal colonies in 1962 and was active in having the island protected as a biological preserve in 1967.

The Poulter Laboratory at SRI International was named after him. After he retired from managing Poulter Labs he founded the Bio Sonar Lab and Marine Mammal Study Center for SRI in the Coyote Hills outside of Fremont CA. There he did research on a number of marine mammals. He was fond of them as he described in a "Note" for the Arctic.

He died on June 4, 1978, in Menlo Park, California, while working in his laboratory.

== Publications ==
- Poulter, Thomas C., (1943) HYDRAULIC PUMP, Patent No. 2,333,885. United States Patent Office.
- Poulter, Thomas C., (1945) METHOD AND APPARATUS FOR CASTING METAL, Patent No. 2,379,401. United States Patent Office.
- Poulter, T. C., (1947) Seismic measurements on the Ross Shelf Ice—Part I, Transactions, American Geophysical Union, Volume 28, Issue 2, p. 162-170.
- Poulter, T. C., Allen, C. F., and Miller, S. W., (1950) Seismic measurements on the Taku Glacier, in Geophysical studies in the Antarctic; Contract N8onr 526, ProjectNo. NR-081-020, published by the Stanford Research Institute.
- Poulter, T. C. (1950) The Poulter seismic method of geophysical exploration, Geophysics, Vol. 1 5, pp. 1 81 -207.
- Poulter, T. C., (1950) The Poulter Seismic Method, The Canadian Mining and Metalluraical Bulletin, May, pp. 258–267.
- Poulter, Thomas C., (1954) METHOD AND APPARATUS FOR SEISMIC EXPLORATION, Patent No. 2,672,204. United States Patent Office.
- Poulter, T. C., (1955) Meteor observations in the Antarctic; Byrd Antarctic Expedition II, 1933–1935. Stanford Research Institute
- Poulter, T. C. 1963. Sonar signals of the sea lion. Science, 139 753-755
- Poulter, T. C. 1963. The sonar of the sea lion. Inst. Elec. Electron. Eng. Trans., 10, 109-111
- Pressure regulation in the middle ear cavity of sea lions: a possible mechanism S Odend'hal, T C Poulter Science. 1966 Aug 12;153 (737):768-9 5940898
- Orr, R. T. and T. C. Poulter (1967) Some observations on reproduction, growth, and social behavior in the Steller sea lion Proceedings of the California Academy of Sciences 35:193–226
- Sea lion echo ranging H N Shaver, T C Poulter The Journal of the Acoustical Society of America. 1967 Aug
- R C Hubbard, T C Poulter 1968 Seals and sea lions as models for studies in comparative biology Lab Anim Care. 1968 Apr;18 (2):Suppl:288-97 4233361
- Watkins, W.; Singleton, R.; Poulter, T. Comments on spectral analysis of the calls of the Male Killer Whale Audio and Electroacoustics, IEEE Transactions on Volume 16, Issue 4, Dec 1968 Page(s): 523 - 523
- R J Stephens, I J Beebe, T C Poulter Innervation of the vibrissae of the California sea lion, Zalophus californianus Anat Rec. 1973 Aug;176 (4):421-41 4723405
- W B Neff, M T Sullivan, T C Poulter A magnetic-drive circulator designed for completely closed carbon dioxide absorption systems Anesthesiology. 1979 Aug;51 (2):169-70 453621
