= Folger Estate Stable Historic District =

- U.S. National Register of Historic Places
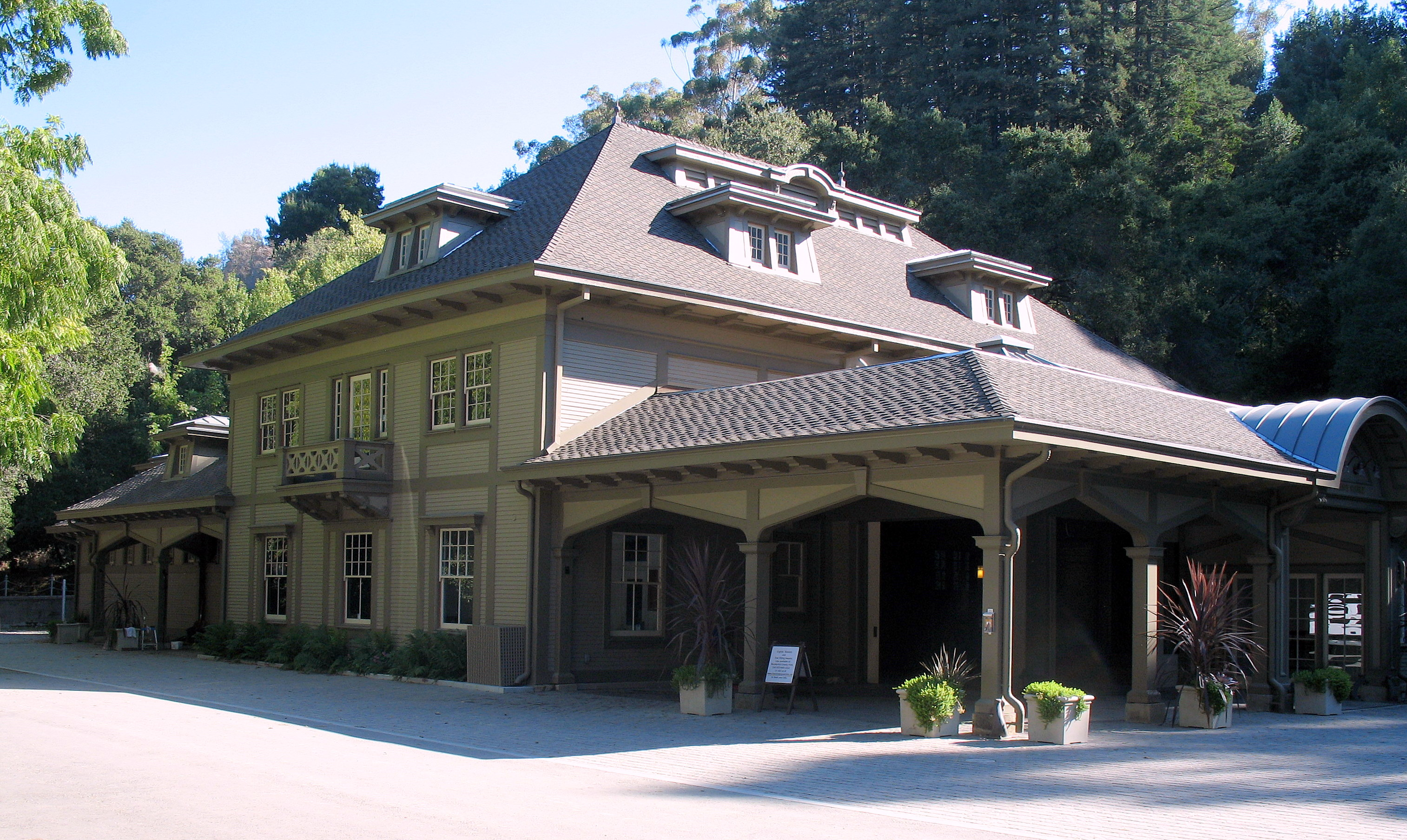
- Folger Estate Stable (2011)

- Location within San Francisco Bay Area Location within California Location within the United States
- Location: 4040 Woodside Road, Woodside, California, 94062
- Coordinates: 37°24′30″N 122°15′29″W
- Area: 3 acres (1.2 ha)
- Architects: Schultze and Brown, Arthur Brown Jr, Henry A. Schulze
- Architectural style: French Barque, Arts and Crafts
- NRHP reference No.: 04000328
- Added to NRHP: 2004

Folger Estate Stable Historic District also known as Jones Ranch, Mountain Home Ranch, is located at 4040 Woodside Road in Woodside, California at Wunderlich Park, with the majority of the historic buildings built between 1905 and 1906. It was listed on the National Register of Historic Places on April 16, 2004. The historic district is a three-acre site with ten buildings, including the main horse stable building, carriage house, stone walls lining the roads, blacksmith barn, and the cold house.

== History ==
=== Early history ===
The site of the Folger Estate was a Redwood forest occupied by the Ohlone Native Americans, prior to the arrival of Europeans. By 1840, the land was part of the Rancho Cañada de Raymundo land grant, granted to John Coppinger. A large part of the land (including the site of Folgers Estate) was sold in 1846, to Charles Brown, a lumberjack who built the city's first sawmill and named the property "Mountain Home Ranch". After Brown heavily logged the land (specifically near Folgers Estate) he abandoned the property and it changed ownership more than nine times.

In 1872, Simon Jones and his son, Everett acquired the property, then referred to as "Jones Ranch", the land had been logged for more than twenty six years and it was mostly treeless. The Jones family had the stone structures (the dairy house and many of the stone walls) built between 1874 and 1902, as well as a wooden house, barn and related buildings which was torn down in the 1970s and 1980s. The stone wall on the property was built by Chinese laborers.

=== Folger family ===
James Athearn Folger, II (1864–1921) and his wife Clara E. (née Luning, 1866–1940), heir to J. A. Folger and Folgers Coffee Company, built the estate and stables between 1905 and 1906. This is considered the historically significant period of architecture (per the National Park Service). The house and stable were designed by the architectural firm of Schultze and Brown and the design was influenced by French Baroque architecture and the Arts and Crafts movement. A recent graduate of the Ecole des Beaux Arts, this architectural site was Arthur Brown Jr.'s first California design project and he went on to design San Francisco City Hall, the War Memorial Opera House, and Hoover Tower at Stanford University.

The property was used to breed horses; the horses were used for recreational riding as well as for transportation. The stables are from the Gilded Age and feature pink marble baseboards, redwood wainscoting, and skylights. The horse stable consists of stalls, tack and harness rooms, a carriage room, feed rooms, living quarters for staff, workshop and boiler room, with hay storage on the lofted second floor.

In c.1940-1941, after the deaths of the Folgers, the estate sold the property.

=== Later history ===
In 1955, the house which is located a half-mile away from the stables was sold as a separate property and is a private residence.

In 1956, the stable and adjoining 940+ acres of land were sold to Martin Wunderlich, who later donated it to the county for a public park. In the 1960s a few Stanford University students lived in the upper loft of the stables. In 1974, the property became part of Wunderlich Park, with the Folger Estate Stable Historic District occupying 3-acres, within the 945-acre county park. In 1977, Atari co-founder Nolan Bushnell bought the property due in part to his financial windfall from selling Atari to Warner Communications. He and his wife raised 8 children and would remain on the property for 19 years before selling it.

Starting in 2003, large scale fundraising efforts by "Friends of Huddart and Wunderlich Parks" were made in order to repair the structures, form an endowment, and receive the National Register of Historic Places recognition, which included early donations by locals Bill Lane and Bill Butler. In 2010, architect Adolph Rosekrans completed the restoration of many of the buildings.

As of 2022, the stables are still actively used for horses.

== See also ==
- National Register of Historic Places listings in San Mateo County, California
