= Lathrop House (Redwood City, California) =

- U.S. National Register of Historic Places
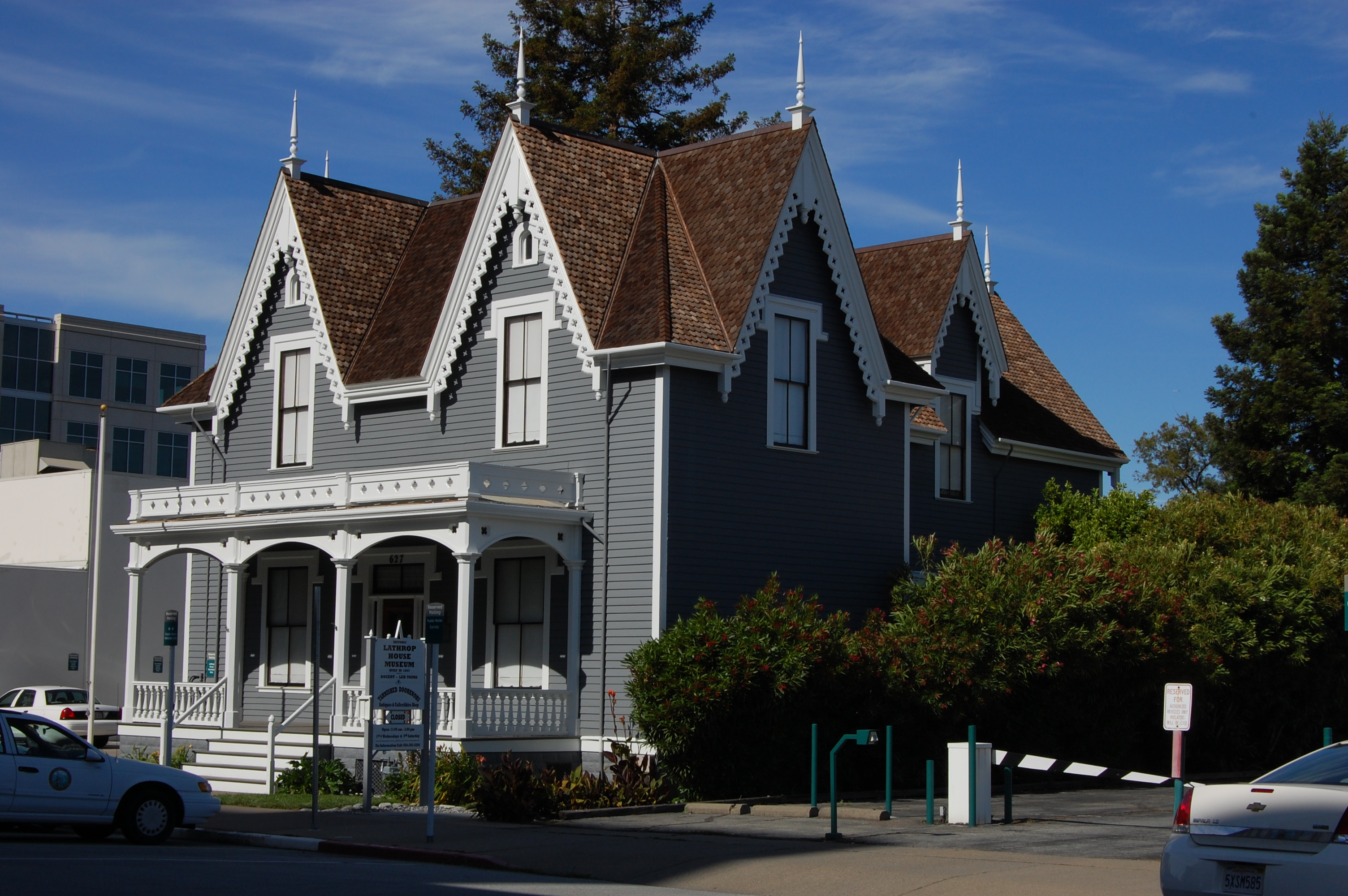
- House viewed from the South

- Location within San Francisco Bay Area Location within California Location within the United States
- Location: 701 Hamilton St., Redwood City, California, California
- Coordinates: 37°29′17″N 122°13′48″W
- Area: 0.2 acres (0.081 ha)
- Built: 1863; 163 years ago
- Architectural style: Steamboat Gothic
- Restored by: Redwood City Heritage Society
- Website: www.lathrophouse.org
- NRHP reference No.: 73000448
- Added to NRHP: April 11, 1973

The Lathrop House, also known as the Lathrop-Connor-Mansfield House, was built in Redwood City, California and is one of the San Francisco Peninsula's oldest mansions. Mary C. Lathrop, wife of Benjamin G. Lathrop, bought the land for the 11 room house in 1858 and construction was completed in 1863. The museum has historically existed in three locations, within a few blocks radius in Redwood City.

== History ==
Benjamin Gordon Lathrop was the first clerk, recorder, and assessor of San Mateo County, California, as well as one of the original investors in the San Francisco to San Jose railroad. This wealth allowed his wife, Mary C. Lathrop and him, to buy up many parcels of land in Redwood City, one of which they constructed the house upon in 1863. It was originally located where the Fox Theatre is now constructed, 2215 Broadway, Redwood City.

The house was constructed in the Gothic Revival style was becoming more popular at the time with tall gables and arches pierced by quatrefoil designs. More specifically it was designed in the Steamboat Gothic style designed to resemble the steamboats of the era.

Lathrop House passed through many owners over the years including Patrick Edward Connor, who had been a Union General, and Sheriff Joel Mansfield, who purchased the house in 1905 and moved it to 627 Hamilton Street.

San Mateo County acquired the house in 1968 to make it part of a heritage center. The Lathrop House was restored on the exterior through joint efforts of the Redwood City Heritage Association and the county. The Lathrop House was operated as a museum by the Redwood City Heritage Association and was open to visitors twice monthly to view the interior of the house. In 2017, it was closed in advance of a planned move of the structure to be adjacent to the San Mateo County History Museum. In May 2019, the house was moved to nearby 701 Hamilton Street.

== Gallery ==
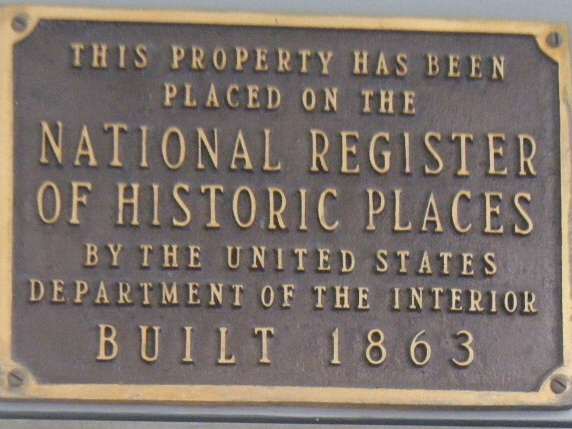
Plaque dedicating NRHP

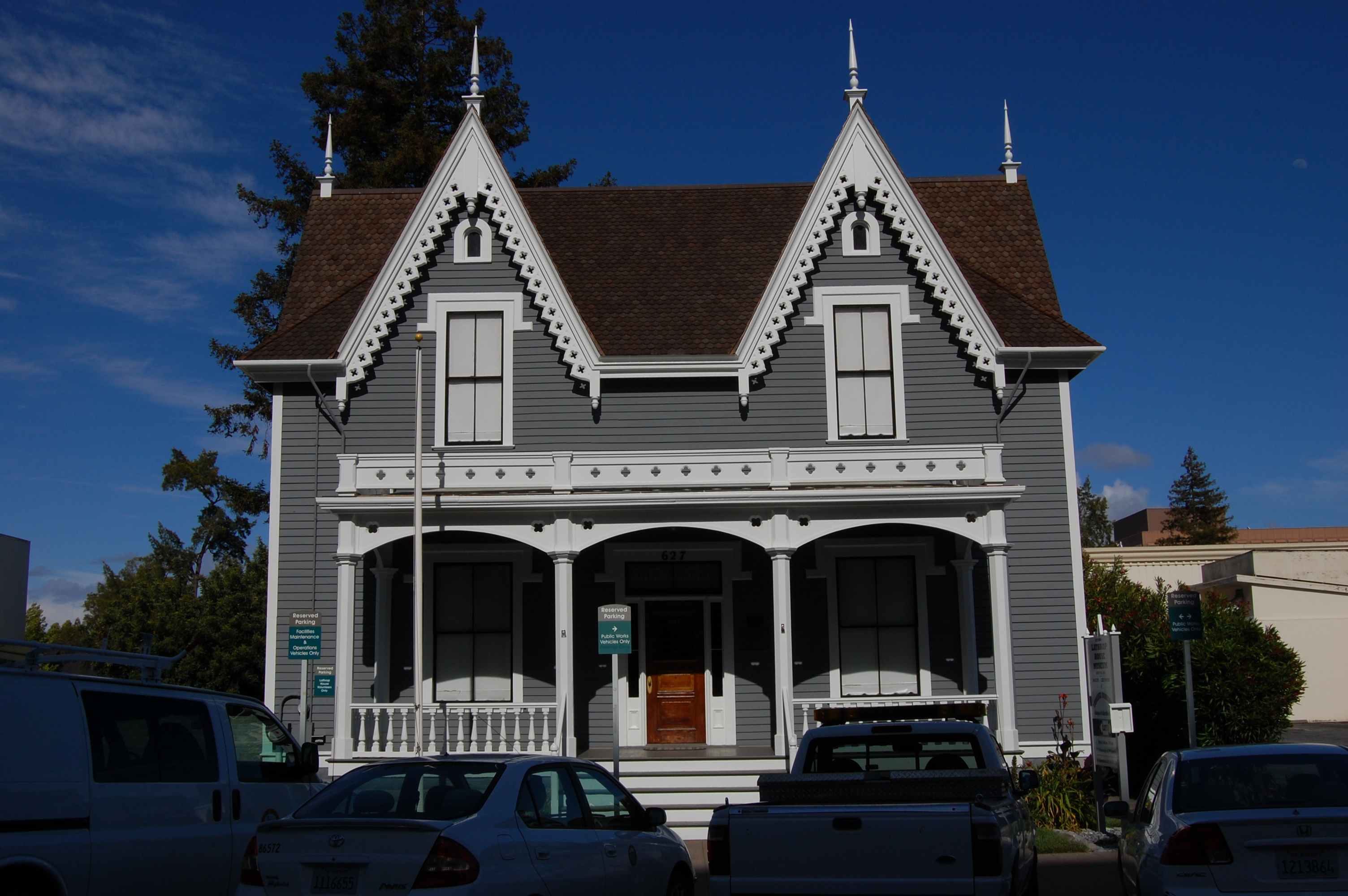
View of front entrance

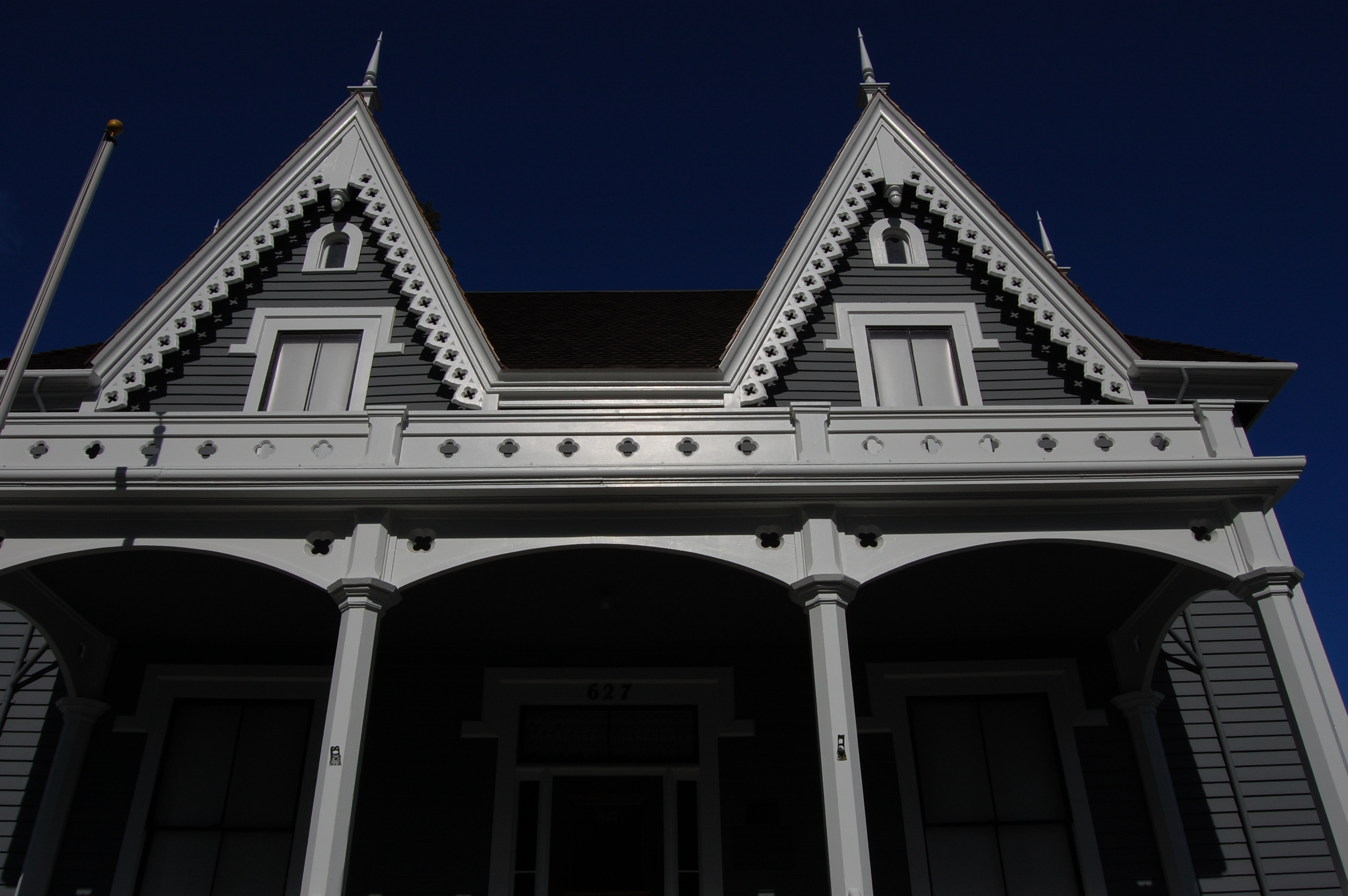
Close up of Steamboat Gothic architecture

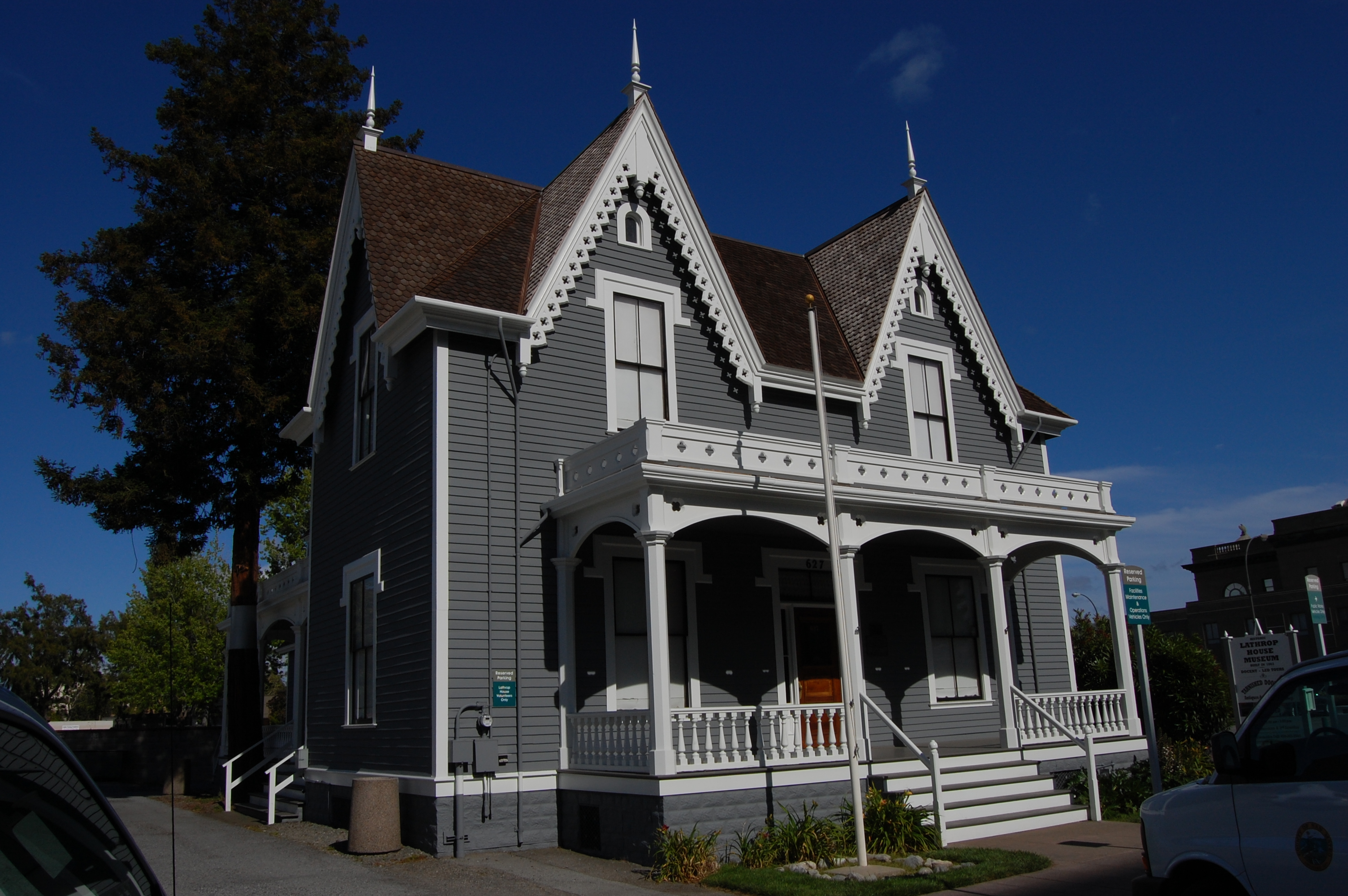
View from Northwest

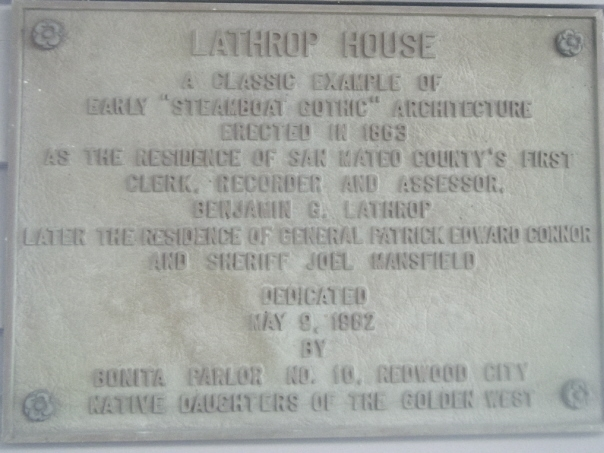
Plaque for architecture

== See also ==
- Fox Theatre
- National Register of Historic Places listings in San Mateo County, California
- San Mateo County History Museum
