= National Bank of San Mateo =

- U.S. National Register of Historic Places
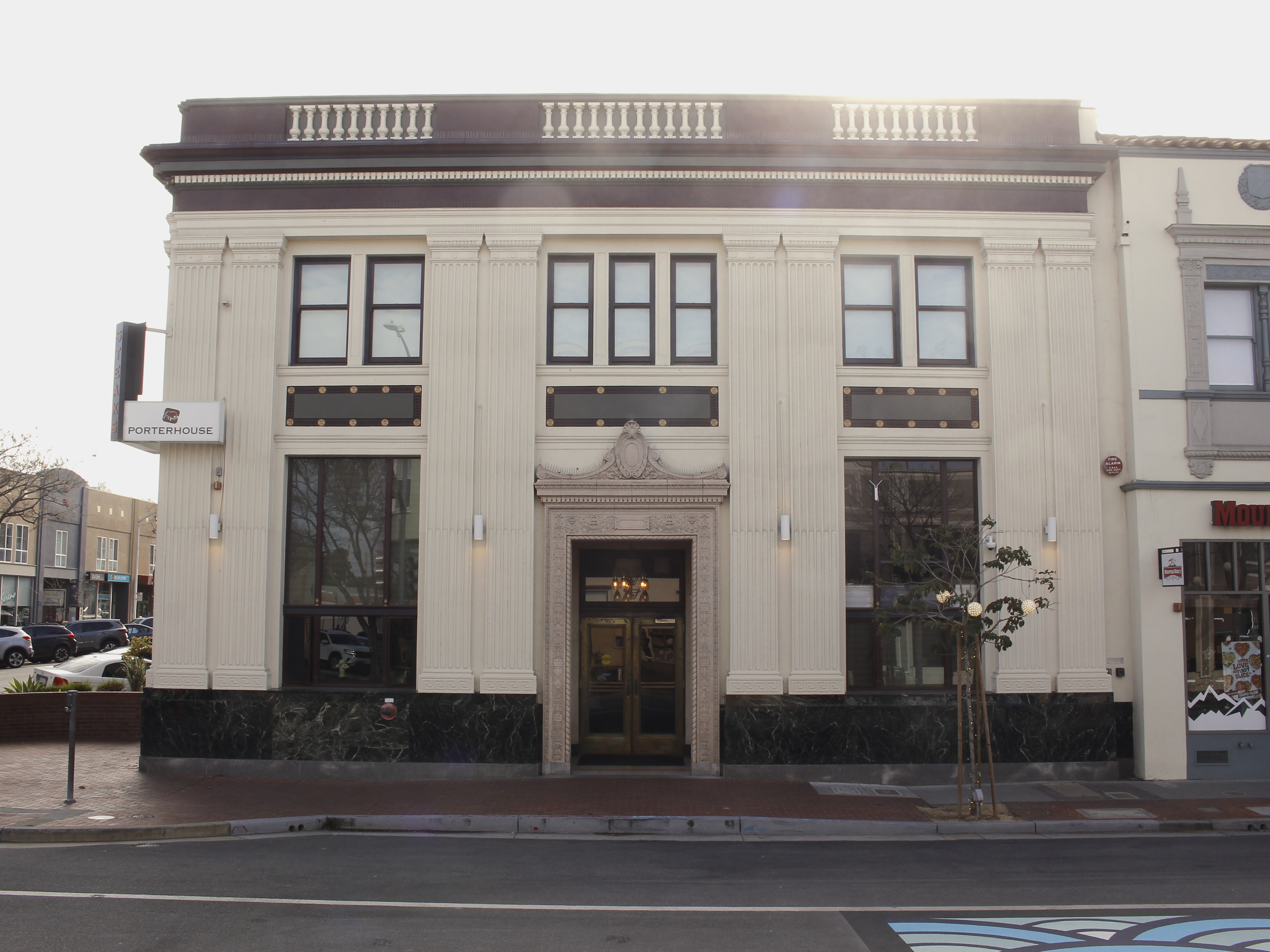
- March 2024

- Location within California
- Location: 164 S. B St., San Mateo, California
- Coordinates: 37°34′00″N 122°19′20″W
- Area: 0.1 acres (0.040 ha)
- Built: 1924
- Built by: Samuel A. Wisnom
- Architect: Weeks & Weeks
- Architectural style: Beaux Arts
- NRHP reference No.: 97000331
- Added to NRHP: April 24, 1997

The National Bank of San Mateo, at 164 S. B St. in San Mateo, California, is a Beaux Arts-style bank built in 1924. It was listed on the National Register of Historic Places in 1997.

It is one of three San Mateo buildings designed by "pioneer California architect" William H. Weeks; and it was built by contractor Samuel A. Wisnom.

In 1955 the local bank was absorbed by, and became a branch of, the Crocker-Anglo Bank. In the 1980s, Wells Fargo absorbed Crocker-Anglo, found this branch to be redundant, and closed it.

It is the only example of Beaux Arts style in San Mateo, and was deemed to be a significant example of the style, despite the instance being somewhat watered-down and late relative to most other works in the style, including those of Weeks.
