= Poulter Laboratory =

American physics research laboratory

The Poulter Laboratory is a research lab within SRI International's Physical Sciences Division known for experiments relating to explosions, impacts, and fire. The lab is named for Thomas Poulter, who gained initial fame as an antarctic explorer, and later as an expert in explosives and biosonar at SRI from 1948 until his death in 1978. Their recent projects include improving the safety of hydrogen as a transportation fuel, and the safe disposal of unused ordnance.
