= Portola Valley, California =

City in California

- Town
- Town of Portola Valley
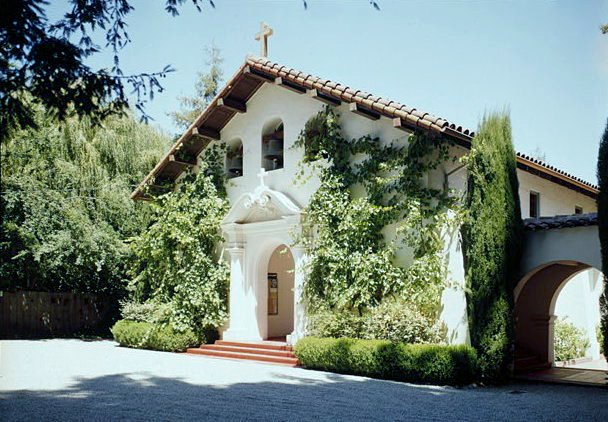
- Our Lady of the Wayside Church

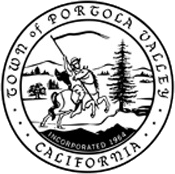
- Seal
- Interactive map of Portola Valley, California
- Location in the United States
- Coordinates: 37°22′30″N 122°13′7″W
- Country: United States
- State: California
- County: San Mateo
- Incorporated: July 14, 1964
- Named for: Gaspar de Portolá

Government
  - Mayor: Judith Hasko
  - Vice Mayor: Craig Taylor

Area
  - Total: 9.08 sq mi (23.53 km^{2})
  - Land: 9.08 sq mi (23.52 km^{2})
  - Water: 0 sq mi (0.00 km^{2}) 0.02%
- Elevation: 460 ft (140 m)

Population (2020)
  - Total: 4,456
  - Density: 490.7/sq mi (189.5/km^{2})
- Time zone: UTC−8 (PST)
  - Summer (DST): UTC−7 (PDT)
- ZIP Code: 94028
- Area code: 650
- FIPS code: 06-58380
- GNIS feature ID: 1659786
- Website: www.portolavalley.net

Portola Valley is a town in San Mateo County, California, United States. As of the 2020 census, the town had a population of 4,456. Located on the San Francisco Peninsula in the Bay Area, the affluent community is nestled on the eastern slopes of the Santa Cruz Mountains.

== History ==
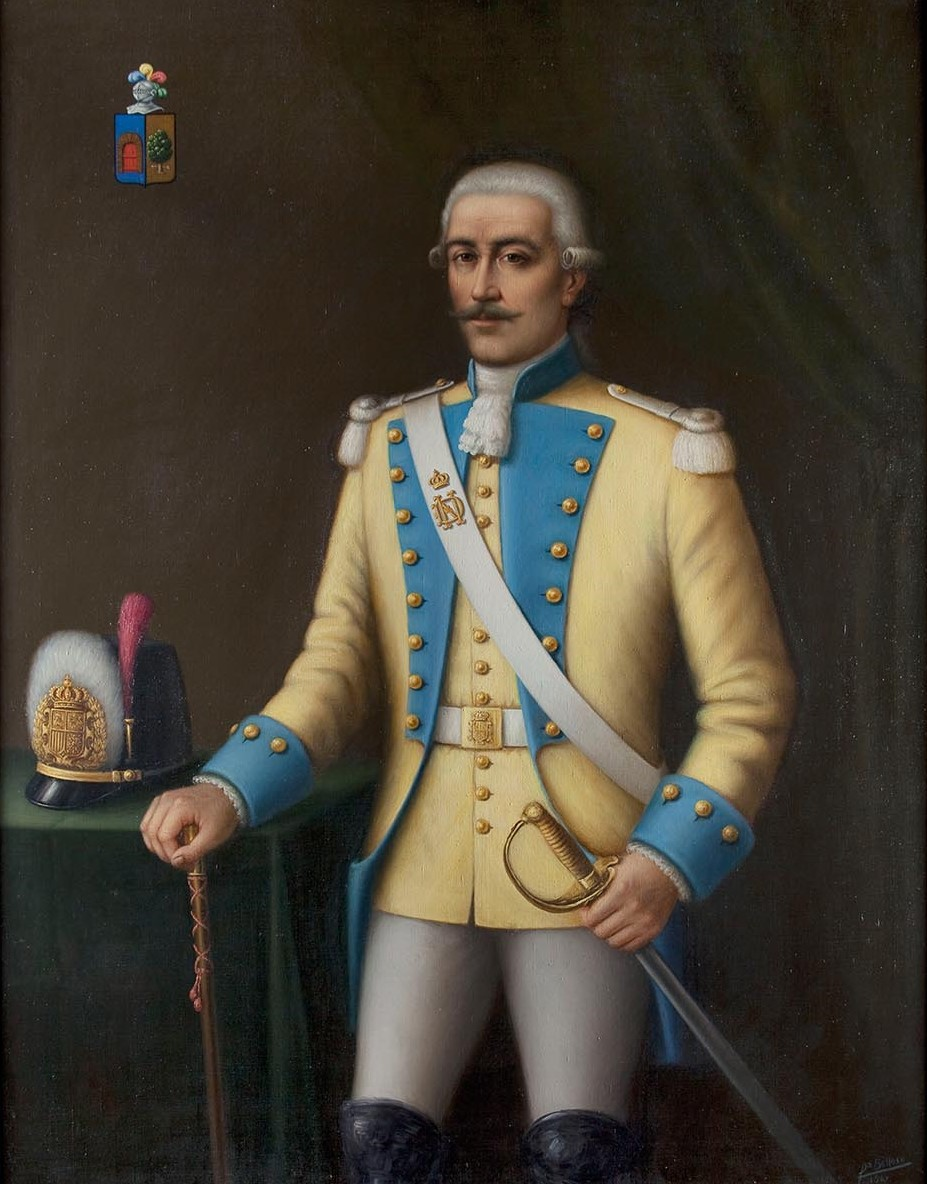
Portola Valley is named after Gaspar de Portolá, first Governor of the Californias and leader of the Portolá expedition.

Portola Valley was named for Spanish explorer Gaspar de Portolá, who led the first party of Europeans to explore the San Francisco Peninsula in 1769.

The Native Americans already present were Ohlone and specifically the group (or groups) known as Olpen or Guemelento but these were later moved to Mission Dolores and Mission Santa Clara de Asís which claimed the land and peoples. The area's written history dates back to 1833, when a square league of land was given to Domingo Peralta and Máximo Martínez by Governor José Figueroa to form the Rancho Cañada del Corte de Madera. In those days it was used for lumbering and cattle grazing.

By the 1880s Andrew S. Hallidie, a wire rope manufacturer, had built his country home of Eagle Home Farm in what is now Portola Valley. He built a 7,341 foot long aerial tramway from his house to the top of Skyline in 1894 though it was removed after his death in 1900.

In 1886 the name Portola-Crespi Valley was bestowed on the area from the then community of Crystal Springs (now under Crystal Springs Reservoir to the then community of Searsville (in the area of the present day Jasper Ridge Biological Preserve); Crespi is for Juan Crespí, a Franciscan friar with the Portolà expedition.

The town was incorporated in 1964. Bill Lane, known as the publisher of Sunset magazine, was its first mayor.

== History of residential housing ==
The conversion of Portola Valley from large ranches to residences began in earnest after World War II, when housing pressures from the growing technology industry expanded out from Santa Clara County to reach San Mateo County.

For Portola Valley, this began with the sub-division of the Ormondale Ranch to form the Westridge neighborhood and Home Owners' Association in 1947.

The process had some complications that needed to be resolved. Developing hillsides poses many unique challenges and restrictions that had to be addressed before areas like Portola Valley could be developed.

When the town was incorporated in 1964 it instituted single-family zoning to replace a variety of other development options that were previously permitted.

== Recent housing issues ==
In recent years, due to the California housing shortage, the state government has increased its pressure on local governments to allow construction of more housing, using a process called the Regional Housing Needs Assessment. In late 2021, this assessment declared that Portola Valley needed to allow for the construction of 253 new housing units over the next 8 years. The state requires localities to submit plans to satisfy this requirement detailing how much housing and what types (low-income, luxury housing) the locality has planned for, and to make zoning changes to allow those types of housing to be built. Previously, Portola Valley's exclusionary zoning has not allowed any multifamily housing and required a large minimum lot size for new single-family housing (1 acre at the time of incorporation later raised to 3.5 acres), resulting in a town that is much whiter and wealthier than average for the area, (75% white vs. 35% in San Mateo county as a whole), with the median household income at $250,000 and the average home costing $3.8 million.

In 2023, during the process of generating the town's housing plan (called a "housing element"), NIMBY homeowners lashed out at the town's workers and Councilmembers, resulting in over two thirds of the town's employees quitting and several of the Councilmembers being replaced. Additionally, according to the Los Angeles Times, about a dozen residents threatened the mayor that if housing plans were not to their liking, they would sue the town in order to force the town to incur such large litigation costs that it would go bankrupt.

In March 2024, the California Department of Housing and Community Development decertified Portola Valley's housing plan because the town had missed the deadline to re-zone to allow for the new housing. It was later recertified in May, 2025. However, by December 2024, fiscal issues arising from the higher costs of using consultants to do the jobs of employees who quit, the costs of lawsuits fighting residents who oppose new housing, and an expected 60% increase in costs for the policing contract with the San Mateo County Sheriff's Office, led some to consider dissolving Portola Valley and merging it with the county or another nearby city, Woodside.

Portola Valley's housing plan was recertified in May, 2025, after the town identified four parcels of land that could be rezoned for multi-family housing. The state accepted the town's alternative housing plans.

In December, 2024, the Town Council, after discussion of solutions to potential traffic problems on a main town artery, unanimously approved a once-controversial project, Stanford University's Portola Terrace. It is set to include 27 single family homes, 12 affordable housing units and 89 parking spaces on 10.8-acre of a 75.2-acre parcel; the rest will be preserved as open space. When built, Stanford Terrace will join the 16-tenant, very-low-income, Willow Commons project for the developmentally disabled as the only multi-family zoned projects to have been approved since the town's incorporation.

== Geography ==
Portola Valley is located on the San Francisco Peninsula on the eastern slope of the Santa Cruz Mountains. The town is west of Interstate 280 and the southwest boundary is along Skyline Boulevard which more or less is the ridge of the mountains. The Windy Hill Open Space Preserve is a large part of the town's southwest side and the north side of the town borders Jasper Ridge Biological Preserve. Woodside borders it to the northwest and Palo Alto to the southeast The unincorporated subdivision of Ladera is adjacent to the northern boundary of the town. It is in a mostly wooded area, with some open fields. The San Andreas Fault bisects the town.

Alpine Road and Portola Road are the two relatively main roads in the town and their intersection forms a small shopping nexus.

Portola Valley can generally be divided into 6 neighborhoods: Central Portola Valley, Portola Valley Ranch, Corte Madera, Woodside Highlands, Westridge, and Blue Oaks. Though Los Trancos Road starts in Portola Valley at Alpine Road, most houses along Los Trancos Road are on the west side, in Palo Alto, across Corte Madera Creek and in a different county (Santa Clara County) than Portola Valley (San Mateo County). Los Trancos/Vista Verde, at the end of Los Trancos Road, is in unincorporated San Mateo County.

According to the United States Census Bureau, the town has a total area of 9.099 square miles (23.57 km^{2}), 99.98% of it land and 0.02% of it water.

== Attractions ==
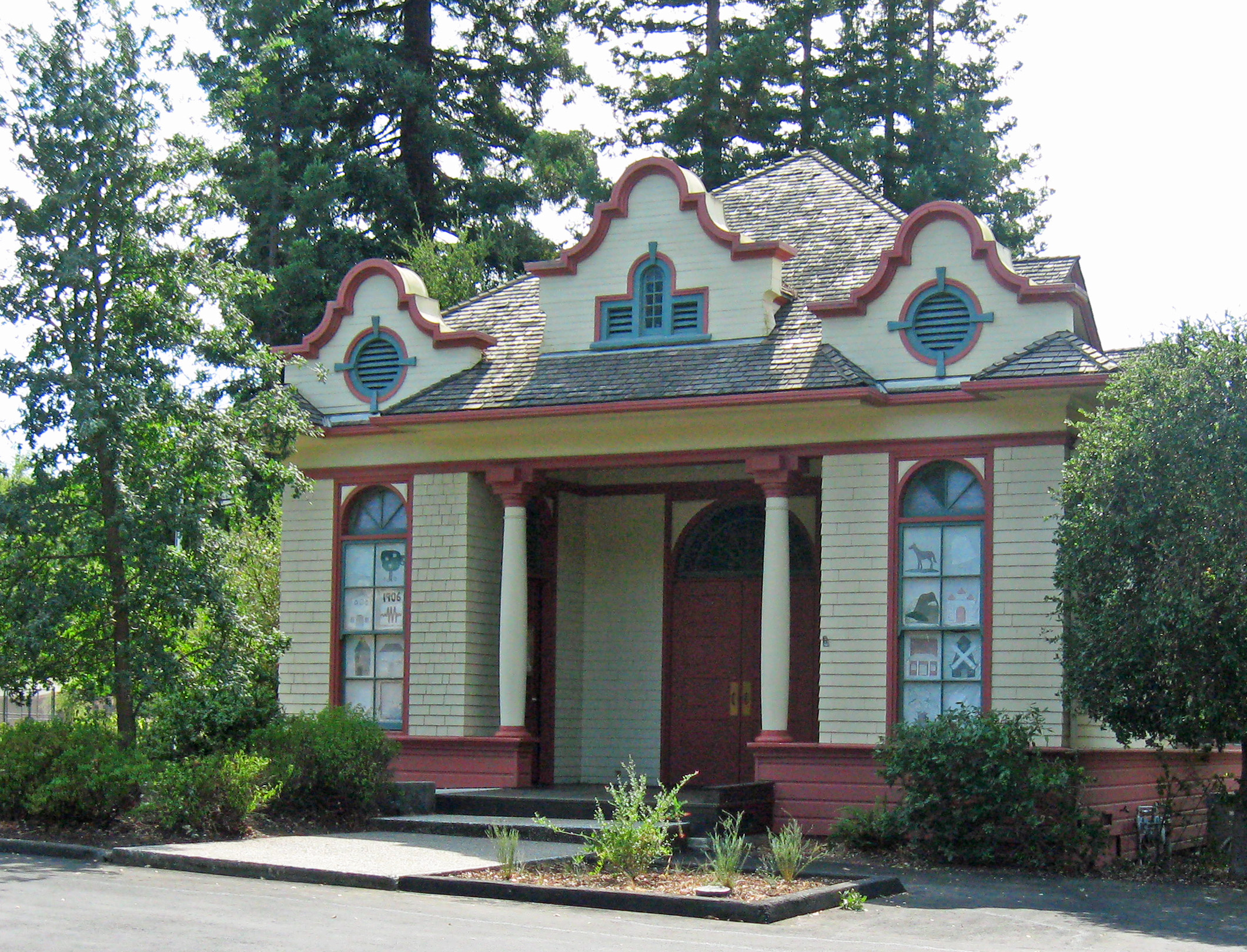
The historic Mission Revival style Portola Valley School, built 1909.

Our Lady of the Wayside Church was built in 1912 for the local Catholic community and is a California Historic Landmark and on the U.S. National Register of Historic Places.

Portola Valley School is a one-room former school house built in 1909 and is on the U.S. National Register of Historic Places. It is now used for town council meetings.

The Alpine Inn, also known as Casa de Tableta, Rossotti's or Zott's, is one of the oldest existing drinking establishments in California; it started around 1852 when Felix Buelna built it as a gambling house. The first two-network TCP/IP transmission was between a specialized SRI van and ARPANET on August 27, 1976; the van was parked next to the Alpine Inn and wires were run to one of the picnic tables. In 2018, the inn was acquired by new owners, who closed it temporarily for remodeling. It was re-opened in August 2019.

=== Trails ===
Portola Valley is known for its expansive trail network both maintained by the town and also in the Windy Hill Open Space Preserve maintained by the Midpeninsula Regional Open Space District. The trail network includes the 235 acre Coal Mine Ridge Nature Preserve which is private property, but, by agreement with the town is set aside as open space.

== Demographics ==
Historical population
Census	Pop.	Note	%±
1970	4,996		—
1980	3,939		−21.2%
1990	4,194		6.5%
2000	4,462		6.4%
2010	4,353		−2.4%
2020	4,456		2.4%
U.S. Decennial Census; 1860–1870 1880-1890; 1900 1910 1920; 1930 1940 1950; 1960 1970 1980; 1990 2000 2010; 2020

The town has a much higher percentage of white people than the rest of San Mateo county, with 75% being white as opposed to 35% in San Mateo county overall in 2020. This has been attributed to its single-family zoning ordinances, which prohibit multifamily dwellings.

As of 2020 the median income per household in Portola Valley was estimated at $235,469 and the per capita income was $142,778.

=== Racial and ethnic composition ===
Portola Valley town, California – Racial and ethnic composition Note: the US Census treats Hispanic/Latino as an ethnic category. This table excludes Latinos from the racial categories and assigns them to a separate category. Hispanics/Latinos may be of any race.
Race / Ethnicity (NH = Non-Hispanic)	Pop 2000	Pop 2010	Pop 2020	% 2000	% 2010	% 2020
White alone (NH)	4,053	3,841	3,542	90.83%	88.24%	79.49%
Black or African American alone (NH)	18	12	11	0.40%	0.28%	0.25%
Native American or Alaska Native alone (NH)	3	1	0	0.07%	0.02%	0.00%
Asian alone (NH)	178	242	342	3.99%	5.56%	7.68%
Native Hawaiian or Pacific Islander alone (NH)	1	1	0	0.02%	0.02%	0.00%
Other race alone (NH)	7	0	23	0.16%	0.00%	0.52%
Mixed race or Multiracial (NH)	53	81	308	1.19%	1.86%	6.91%
Hispanic or Latino (any race)	149	175	230	3.34%	4.02%	5.16%
Total	4,462	4,353	4,456	100.00%	100.00%	100.00%

=== 2020 census ===
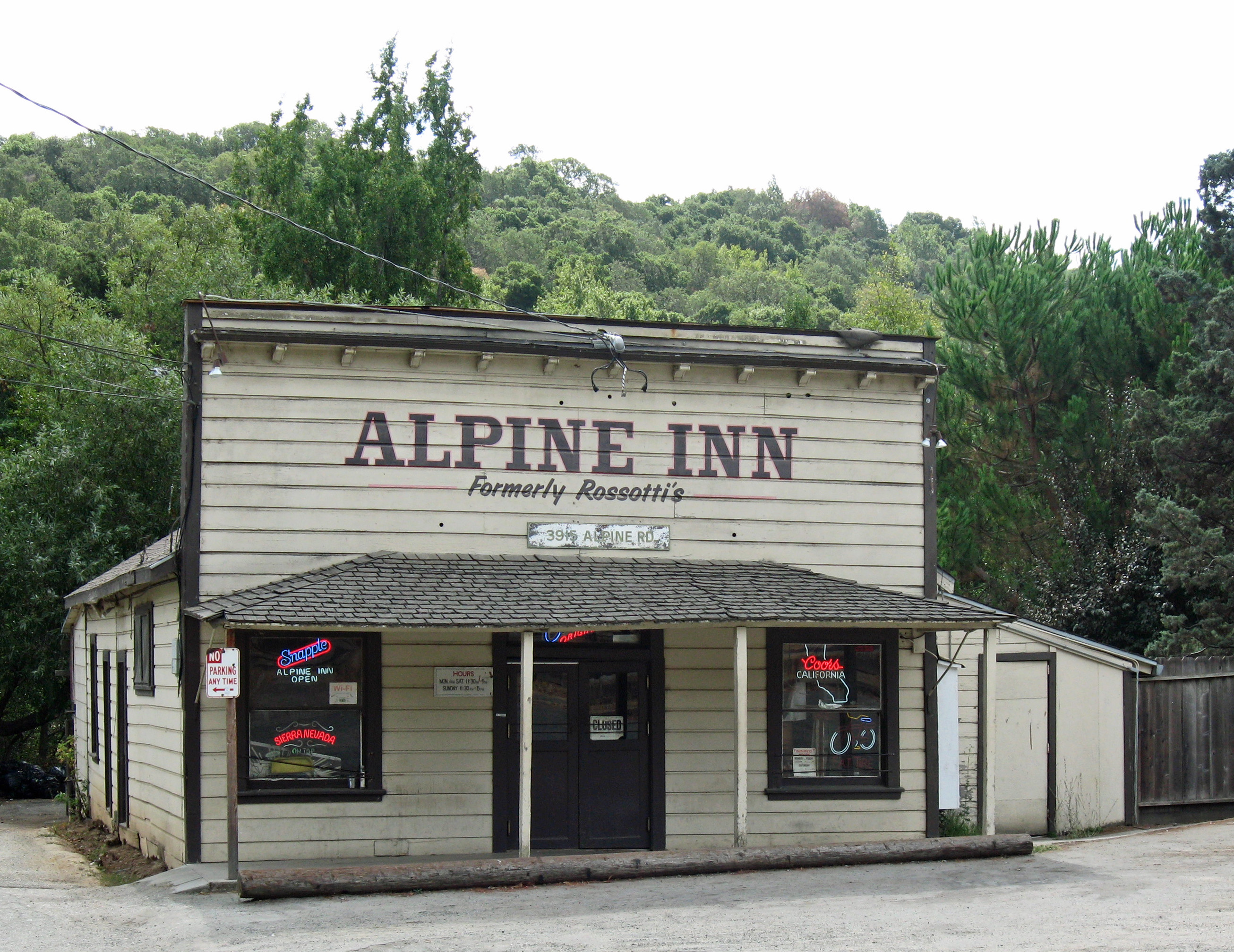
The historic Casa de Tableta, built by Californio entrepreneur Félix Buelna in 1851, now named Rossotti's Alpine Inn.

As of the 2020 census, Portola Valley had a population of 4,456. The median age was 54.5 years. 19.1% of residents were under the age of 18 and 32.5% of residents were 65 years of age or older. For every 100 females there were 94.2 males, and for every 100 females age 18 and over there were 88.0 males age 18 and over.

75.7% of residents lived in urban areas, while 24.3% lived in rural areas.

There were 1,752 households in Portola Valley, of which 26.8% had children under the age of 18 living in them. Of all households, 65.6% were married-couple households, 9.2% were households with a male householder and no spouse or partner present, and 22.1% were households with a female householder and no spouse or partner present. About 23.0% of all households were made up of individuals and 17.7% had someone living alone who was 65 years of age or older.

There were 1,915 housing units, of which 8.5% were vacant. The homeowner vacancy rate was 1.1% and the rental vacancy rate was 6.3%.

Racial composition as of the 2020 census
Race	Number	Percent
White	3,585	80.5%
Black or African American	11	0.2%
American Indian and Alaska Native	4	0.1%
Asian	347	7.8%
Native Hawaiian and Other Pacific Islander	0	0.0%
Some other race	57	1.3%
Two or more races	452	10.1%

=== 2010 census ===
The 2010 United States census reported that Portola Valley had a population of 4,353. The population density was 478.7 inhabitants per square mile (184.8/km^{2}). The racial makeup of Portola Valley was 3,960 (91.0%) White, 12 (0.3%) African American, 5 (0.1%) Native American, 242 (5.6%) Asian, 1 (0.0%) Pacific Islander, 29 (0.7%) other races, and 104 (2.4%) from two or more races. Hispanic or Latino of any race were 175 persons (4.0%).

The Census reported that 4,309 people (99.0% of the population) lived in households, 9 (0.2%) lived in non-institutionalized group quarters, and 35 (0.8%) were institutionalized.

There were 1,746 households, out of which 518 (29.7%) had children under the age of 18 living in them, 1,149 (65.8%) were opposite-sex married couples living together, 70 (4.0%) had a female householder with no husband present, 35 (2.0%) had a male householder with no wife present. There were 37 (2.1%) unmarried opposite-sex partnerships, and 21 (1.2%) same-sex married couples or partnerships. 420 households (24.1%) were made up of individuals, and 290 (16.6%) had someone living alone who was 65 years of age or older. The average household size was 2.47. There were 1,254 families (71.8% of all households); the average family size was 2.93.

The population was spread out, with 1,001 people (23.0%) under the age of 18, 145 people (3.3%) aged 18 to 24, 538 people (12.4%) aged 25 to 44, 1,496 people (34.4%) aged 45 to 64, and 1,173 people (26.9%) who were 65 years of age or older. The median age was 51.3 years. For every 100 females, there were 98.4 males. For every 100 females age 18 and over, there were 91.2 males.

There were 1,895 housing units at an average density of 208.4 per square mile (80.5/km^{2}), of which 1,392 (79.7%) were owner-occupied, and 354 (20.3%) were occupied by renters. The homeowner vacancy rate was 1.0%; the rental vacancy rate was 9.8%. 3,702 people (85.0% of the population) lived in owner-occupied housing units and 607 people (13.9%) lived in rental housing units.

=== 2000 census ===
As of the census of 2000, there were 4,392 people, 1,772 households, and 1,269 families residing in the town. The population density was 487.5 inhabitants per square mile (188.2/km^{2}). There were 1,772 housing units at an average density of 193.6 per square mile (74.7/km^{2}). The racial makeup of the town was 4,210 White, 29 African American, 22 Native American, 217 Asian, 5 Pacific Islander, 54 from other races, and 64 from two or more races. Hispanic or Latino of any race were 149.

There were 1,772 households, out of which 532 had children under the age of 18 living with them, 1,176 were married couples living together, 68 had a woman householder with no man present, and 431 were non-families. 339 of all households were made up of individuals, and 226 had someone living alone who was 65 years of age or older. The average household size was 2.75 and the average family size was 2.93.

In the town the age distribution of the population shows 1021 persons under the age of 18, 90 from 20 to 24, 867 from 25 to 44, 1492 from 45 to 64, and 938 who were 65 years of age or older. The median age was 47.5 years old. For every 100 women there were 96.8 men. For every 100 women age 18 and over, there were 91.7 men.

The median income for a household in Portola Valley, including earnings, is $244,771 and the median income for a family was $180,893. Men have a median income of over $200,000 versus $172,585 for women. The per capita income for Portola Valley is $152,128. About 18 families and 104 people were below the poverty line, including 38 of those under age 18 and none of those age 65 or over.

== Education ==
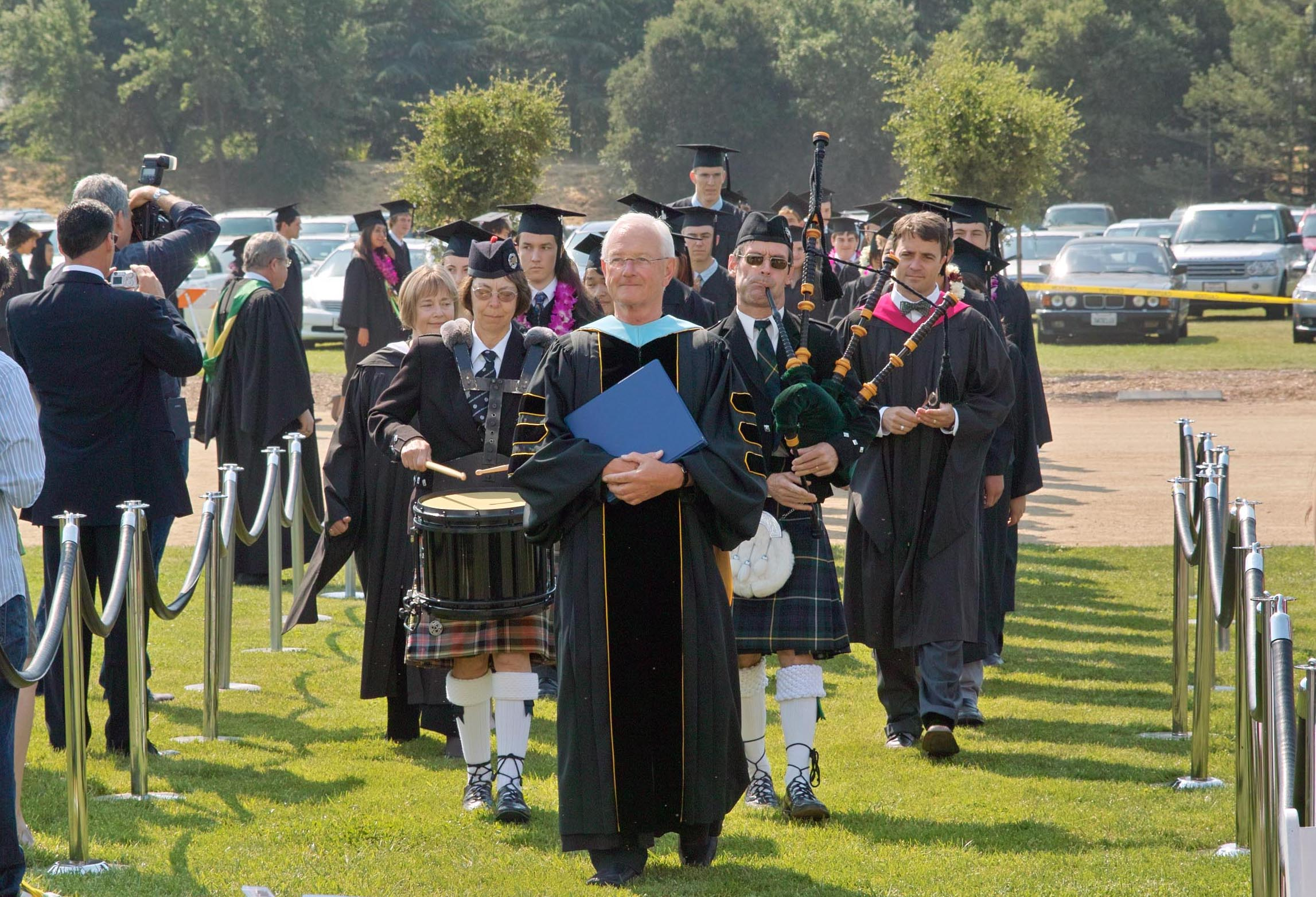
Woodside Priory School.

The Portola Valley Elementary School District has two public primary schools: Ormondale School (with grades K–3) and Corte Madera School (grades 4–8). The public high school is Woodside High School, part of the Sequoia Union High School District and in the neighboring community of Woodside. Ormondale is named for the Ormondale ranch that had covered much of present-day Westridge, Oak Hills, and Ladera and was home to the famous English racehorse, Ormonde, in his later years.

Portola Valley is also home to two private schools: Woodside Priory School, an independent college-preparatory Roman Catholic day and boarding school serving around 430 students in grades 6–12, and Woodland School, an independent pre-K-8 grade school with about 300 students.

The city is served by the Portola Valley Public Library of the San Mateo County Libraries, a member of the Peninsula Library System.

== Government ==
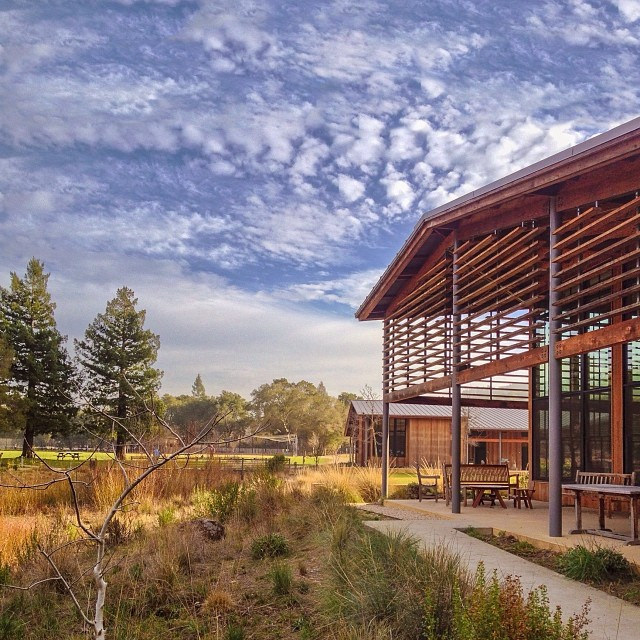
Portola Valley Library.

In the California State Legislature, Portola Valley is in the 13th senatorial district, represented by Democrat Josh Becker, and in the 23rd Assembly district, represented by Democrat Marc Berman.

Federally, Portola Valley is in California's 16th congressional district, represented by Democrat Sam Liccardo. Politically, Portola Valley leans slightly Democratic based on voting patterns for past presidential elections.

Portola Valley is part of the Woodside Fire Protection District (which also covers Woodside, Ladera, Emerald Hills, Los Trancos, Skyline, and Viste Verde), which has one its three stations in the town.

For law enforcement, Portola Valley contracts with the San Mateo County Sheriff's Office.

The Portola Valley Town Council made up of volunteers elected for four year terms governs the town. It appoints a town manager and other necessary officers and also elects a mayor and vice-mayor from the council members.

== Interesting Features ==
Local Seismograph -- Portola Valley features a real-time online web page of seismographic events, operated and funded by volunteer town residents.

== Notable people ==
- John Arrillaga (1937–2022), billionaire, real estate mogul and noted philanthropist
- Pat Burrell, retired baseball player.
- Curtis Carlson, former CEO of SRI International
- Roger Craig, retired pro football player.
- Hewitt D. Crane (1927–2008), engineer and inventor who worked at SRI International
- Richard Crooks (1900–1972), operatic tenor, longtime host of The Voice of Firestone on network radio who, in later years, sang with the choir at the local Presbyterian church, lived in Portola Valley for many years until his death.
- John Donahoe, an American businessman who was the CEO of Nike; He has been the CEO of tech companies like eBay, PayPal and ServiceNow
- Donna Dubinsky, CEO of Palm, Inc.
- Taylor Eigsti, jazz pianist. From Menlo Park, California, but graduated salutatorian of his high school class at Woodside Priory School.
- Stanley Falkow (1934–2018) microbiologist, died in Portola Valley.
- Thomas J. Fogarty, surgeon and inventor of the embolectomy catheter.
- Tennessee Ernie Ford (1919–1991), singer best known for "Sixteen Tons".
- Reid Hoffman, co-founder of LinkedIn.
- Cuthbert Hurd (1911–1996), computer pioneer. who discovered a popular variety manzanita in his garden.
- Laurence W. "Bill" Lane Jr. (1919–2010), the first mayor and one of the founders of Portola Valley, also served as Ambassador to Japan and Australia for the US, and the publisher of Sunset Magazine.
- Chong Moon Lee, founder of Diamond Multimedia.
- Jacques Littlefield (1949–2009), president and founder of the Military Vehicle Technology Foundation, one of the largest collections of historical military vehicles in the world.
- Pete McCloskey (1927–2024), former member of Congress and co-chair of Earth Day. He was also the Town of Portola Valley's first city attorney.
- Maverick McNealy, professional golfer, former World No. 1 ranked amateur golfer
- Kent Mitchell, Olympic rowing champion, former mayor of Portola Valley
- Geoff Nuttall (1966–2022) a co-founder and first violinist of the Saint Lawrence String Quartet
- Ed Oates, a co-founder of Oracle Corporation; currently on the board of the San Francisco Zoological Society, and the San Jose State University Tower Foundation.
- Larry Tesler (1945–2020) inventor of the cut, copy, paste commands died at Portola Valley
