= Folger (disambiguation) =

Folger is a surname.

It may also refer to:

- Cape Folger, a cape on the Budd Coast of Antarctica
- Folger Coffee Company Building, an office building in San Francisco, California, U.S.
- Folger Estate Stable Historic District, a historic district in Woodside, California, U.S.
- Folger Park, a park in Washington, D.C., U.S.
- Folger Rock, a rock in Nelson Island, Antarctica

== See also ==
- Folgers
- Foulger
