= The Coffin of Andy and Leyley =

2023 indie video game by Nemlei

- Promotional banner used for the Steam release
- Developers: Nemlei; Kit9 Studio (since November 2023)
- Publisher: Kit9 Studio
- Engine: RPG Maker MV
- Platform: Windows
- Release: Episode 1: March 25, 2023 (Note: Released along with a demo on itch.io.); Episode 2: October 13, 2023 (Note: Released along with episode 1 in early access on Steam.); Episode 3A: April 1, 2025; Episode 3B: TBA; Episode 4: TBA
- Genres: Adventure; Psychological horror
- Mode: Single-player

The Coffin of Andy and Leyley (Note: /ˈleɪleɪ/ LAY-lay) is a horror visual novel adventure game developed by Nemlei and published by Kit9 Studio for Microsoft Windows. Incorporating incestuous, dark comedy and psychological horror elements, the plot follows siblings Andrew and Ashley Graves, who find themselves in a codependent relationship with one another as they commit various crimes while attempting to survive a dystopian world.

The game originated as a demo released on itch.io, and was later expanded and released on Steam in an early access state. The Steam early access version of the game was released on October 13, 2023. The current version of the game features two and a half of four planned chapters, with the second half of the third in development, being a continuation of two different routes in the second chapter.

== Gameplay ==
The starting area of The Coffin of Andy and Leyley, depicting the apartment in which the siblings are trapped

The Coffin of Andy and Leyley is an adventure game presented from a top-down perspective, in which players, playing as sibling protagonists Andrew and Ashley Graves, explore the environment and solve puzzles to advance the narrative. At times, the player is asked to make choices which may change the direction of the game's story, and unlock one of multiple endings.

== Plot ==
=== Episode 1 ===
Siblings Andrew and Ashley Graves have been trapped in their apartment for three months without food, following a quarantine order after an apparent parasite outbreak. Having been abandoned by their parents and left with no means to call for help, they are slowly starving. One day, they discover a cultist neighbor attempting to summon a demon. While the cultist succeeds, the demon steals his soul, and Andrew and Ashley decide to butcher and cannibalize his body for food.

Upon learning there is no outbreak and they are deliberately being starved to death as part of an illegal organ harvesting operation, the siblings plan to escape; Andrew kills one of the two guards keeping them imprisoned, while Ashley sacrifices the soul of the other to the demon. The demon offers Ashley a "trinket" which will supposedly grant her clairvoyant dreams. Andrew and Ashley flee the apartment complex and go into hiding.

=== Episode 2 ===
While in hiding, Andrew and Ashley find themselves destitute and running out of money. They see on the news that their apartment has burned down, and as such they are presumed dead by the authorities, with the fire erasing all evidence of their prior crimes. The clairvoyance the demon granted to Ashley also proves to be real, as she uses a premonition to kill a hitman hunting her and Andrew. They decide to burglarize their parents' house to replenish their funds but are interrupted when their mother arrives home earlier than expected. She is surprised by their appearance after their supposed deaths but reluctantly allows them to stay for the night.

After the Graves family have an awkward dinner together, Ashley argues to Andrew that they should kill their parents in order to keep them from revealing that they survived, which would potentially incriminate them. In addition, there is the possibility their parents left them to die in the apartment in return for a life insurance payout. Unable to argue against this reasoning, he reluctantly agrees. The siblings take their parents hostage and sacrifice their souls in a ritual to the demon. They then butcher their parents' bodies and dispose of the remains, with Ashley cooking some of their meat into a soup which she and Andrew eat together.

Ashley and Andrew resolve to acquire new identities and continue their lives together. Depending on the players' prior choices, they will either be antagonistic towards one another (the "Decay" route) or friendly with one another (the "Burial" route). In the Burial route, the demon's talisman causes Ashley and Andrew to see a potential future premonition of themselves entering an incestuous sexual relationship. In the Decay route, Ashley experiences a premonition that either Andrew will kill her or she will kill him, which she refuses to tell him about when she wakes.

=== Episode 3A ===
In a flashback of a trip to his grandparents' house when he was a child, Andrew accidentally summons and makes contact with a demon called "Something Terrifying". It takes an interest in Andrew and lets him go, with Andrew himself writing off the experience as a dream. Back in the present, Andrew secretly steals Ashley's trinket and tries to use it, seeing a vision of Ashley's dismembered corpse. Ashley is angered at Andrew using her trinket without permission and they decide to sacrifice a family of campers to recharge it. However, the ritual goes awry when the police are called, and the demon allows the siblings to flee to the Demon Realm for safety.

In return for safe haven in the Demon Realm, the demon enlists Ashley's aid to continue gathering souls for it while Andrew is left to wait in the Demon Realm. While searching the Demon Realm, the siblings uncover "visions" that the demon had collected, and through them, discover that their parents did indeed sell them out to an organ harvesting operation organized by a corrupt doctor simply called "the Surgeon". However, neither Andrew nor the demon trust each other and the situation between them rapidly deteriorates. While Ashley is away at the Human Realm to gather souls, the demon banishes Andrew to the "In Between" to get rid of him. Andrew attempts to summon the demon again but accidentally summons Something Terrifying instead. Realizing that it must have encountered Andrew before, Something Terrifying decides to read his memories.

After reliving several of his childhood memories, Andrew comes to the realization that he has suppressed feelings of lust towards Ashley, which greatly distresses him. Something Terrifying, revealing its name as "Lord Unknown", comforts Andrew and suggests that they become partners as they can both help each other. Intrigued, Andrew accepts Lord Unknown's offer and enters a portal to an unknown location.

In addition to this ending, there is another ending where the siblings get engaged but end up in an abusive relationship, and several game overs which include: the siblings being gunned down by the police, Andrew accepting becoming Ashley's toy, and the siblings committing a double suicide by leaping to their deaths.

== Development ==
Title logo for The Coffin of Andy and Leyley

The Coffin of Andy and Leyley was developed by independent developer Nemlei. Initially released as a demo on Itch.io, it later received an early access release on Steam, which contained two of four planned episodes.

On November 27, 2023, publisher Kit9 Studio announced that they had acquired the publishing rights for The Coffin of Andy and Leyley, and that they would be managing further development of the title, with Nemlei opting to discontinue their online presence while continuing to provide art and writing for the game.

From January to October, 2024, Kit9 Studio would publish monthly progress reports regarding the development of episodes 3 and 4 before changing its reporting format due to a "chaotic roadmap ahead".

In March 2025, Nemlei announced Episode 3A: Decay to be officially complete. In April 2026, Nemlei announced that Burial will likely release before Decay. In a June 2026 progress report, Kit9 Studio announced that development had been delayed due to legal issues involving individuals in the fandom who had created copyright-infringing fan content and sold bootleg copies of the game. They also announced a Coffin of Andy and Leyley-inspired game jam.

== Reception ==
Destructoid's Andrea Gonzalez gave The Coffin of Andy and Leyley a positive review, describing it as "a well-written exploration of a toxic sibling dynamic" and praising the overall tone of the narrative. The Mary Sue's Ana Valens praised the game's exploration of taboo subject matter, stating that it "has an important commentary to share about abuse, trauma, and dysfunctional family dynamics", while also comparing the events of chapter 2 to the Folgers "Coming Home" advertisement.

Famitsu's Tomato Sugihara cited the game as "an incredibly satisfying game that can be played for under 1,900 yen," commenting that "you won't be able to take your eyes off the increasingly insane plot as you play" and that "watching the actions of the brother and sister, whose unique worldview and sense of ethics are completely at odds with one another, gives you a sense of immense darkness and sickness".

The Gamer's Rowan Cardosa called the game "a throwback to edgy RPG Maker horror games of the past". Although the difficulty was criticised as too easy, they praised the "strong-narrative focus with puzzle-based gameplay" and called it "a truly interesting game".

Kotaku Australia's Emily Spindler expressed bewilderment at the game's content, juxtaposing the game's cannibalistic and incestuous themes with its "overwhelmingly positive" reception on Steam. She noted that over 7,000 Steam users positively reviewed The Coffin of Andy and Leyley, often leaving idiosyncratic comments endorsing the game's content.

=== Online controversy ===
The Coffin of Andy and Leyley went viral due to its depiction of incest. The Mary Sue's Ana Valens says that many internet users did not agree with the "thematic importance" of a scene depicting incest, with one user saying the game "glorified" the act, while a Twitter thread recommended games to play "instead of the shitty incest game". This, along with an attempted doxxing of the game's developer Nemlei, may have led to them to "permanently and completely terminate their activities online" in late November 2023, according to a post by Kit9, in which they add that they "wish to be left alone".
