= Folger =

Folger is an English and German surname. Notable people with the surname include:

- Abiah Folger (1667–1752), mother of Benjamin Franklin
- Abigail Folger (1943–1969), American civil rights activist
- Alonzo Dillard Folger (1888–1941), American politician
- Charles J. Folger (1818–1884), American politician
- Dan Folger (1943–2006), American singer and songwriter
- Emily Jordan Folger (1858–1936), Shakespeare scholar
- Henry Clay Folger (1857–1930), founder of the Folger Shakespeare Library
- J. A. Folger (1835–1889), founder of the Folgers Coffee Company
- John Clifford Folger (1893–1981), United States Ambassador to Belgium (1957-59)
- John Hamlin Folger (1880–1963), American politician and lawyer, United States Secretary of the Treasury
- Jonas Folger (born 1993), German motorbike racer
- Joseph P. Folger (21st century), American professor of communication
- Mary Morrell Folger, grandmother of Benjamin Franklin, referenced in Moby Dick
- Mayhew Folger (1774–1828), American whaler and grandfather of William M. Folger
- Peter Folger (1905–1980), American businessperson
- Peter Folger (Nantucket settler) (1617–1690), Baptist missionary, teacher, and surveyor, grandfather of Benjamin Franklin
- Walter Folger Jr. (1765–1849), American politician
- William M. Folger (1844–1928), United States Navy rear admiral and grandson of Mayhew Folger

== See also ==
- Folger Shakespeare Library, an independent research library in Washington, D.C. established by Henry Clay Folger
- Folgers, an American coffee brand
