= Foulger =

Foulger is a surname. Notable people with the surname include:

- Byron Foulger (1899–1970), American actor
- Gillian Foulger (born 1952), British geologist and academic
- John Foulger (1942–2007), English painter
- Keith Foulger (1925–2021), British naval architect
- Peter Foulger, also Peter Folger (1617–1690), Nantucket settler, teacher, poet

== See also ==
- Folger
