= Matthew Alan =

American actor

- Born: Matthew Gerbig; June 17, 1978 (age 47); Evansville, Indiana, U.S.
- Occupation: Actor
- Years active: 2003–present
- Spouse: Camilla Luddington (m. 2019)
- Children: 2

Matthew Alan (born June 17, 1978) is an American actor.

== Early life ==
Alan was born in 1978 as Matthew Gerbig. He was raised in Evansville, Indiana, where he graduated from Reitz High School in 1996. He went on to obtain a degree from Western Kentucky University in 2000. His parents are Karen and Larry Gerbig.

== Career ==
Alan's early work includes the Bud Light beer television commercial "The Lucky Chair", with Stevie Wonder, that premiered during the 2013 Super Bowl. As Matthew Gerbig, he appeared in the films Charlie's War (2003) and Bell Witch Haunting (2004) before taking his stage name. Alan's work includes a recurring role in 2007 on the CBS streaming series Ghost Whisperer: The Other Side, a companion to the network series Ghost Whisperer, and in 2017 and 2018 on the Netflix series 13 Reasons Why; and the recurring role of Chris Merrill in the Hulu series Castle Rock.

He additionally has appeared in TV series including Veronica Mars, Lost, Modern Family. The Mentalist and Grey's Anatomy, and in films including Walking the Halls and Red Tails (both 2012), Hidden in the Woods (2014), and Trust Fund (2016). He is also a producer of the short film Bowman (2011).

A 2009 Folger's coffee commercial with actress Catherine Combs, which became a Christmastime staple for several years, developed a fan following over what some perceived as romantic undertones between siblings, inspiring comedy sketches from Daniel Tosh and Chelsea Handler.

== Personal life ==
Alan is married to English actress Camilla Luddington. They married in August 2019. The couple have two children.

== Filmography ==
=== Film ===
| Year | Title | Role | Notes |
|---|---|---|---|
| 2003 | Charlie's War | Lt. Walton | |
| 2004 | Bell Witch Hunting | Mr. Richardson | |
| 2006 | Call Me Sugarplum | Mikey | Short |
| 2008 | Deadwater | Lt. Chris McCloskey | Video |
| 2008 | Jarred | - | Short |
| 2009 | 2084 | Trelaine | |
| 2009 | Folgers Coffee: Coming Home | Brother | Video |
| 2010 | The Filming of Shakey Willis | Rob/'Jedward' | Video |
| 2010 | Disarmed | Dan Gerbig | |
| 2011 | Bowman | Jason | Short |
| 2011 | Beautiful Wave | Blake - Frat Boy #2 | |
| 2011 | Hold Fast | Tom | Short |
| 2011 | The Shadows of Ants | Joel | |
| 2012 | Walking the Halls | Jack | |
| 2012 | Red Tails | Pool Player | |
| 2012 | Absolute Fear | Dale Morrow | |
| 2013 | The Surrogate | Matt | TV movie |
| 2013 | The Shifting | Banks | |
| 2013 | Living Dark: The Story of Ted the Caver | Brad | |
| 2014 | Summer Snow | Colton | |
| 2014 | Hidden in the Woods | Steven | |
| 2016 | Trust Fund | Jonathan | |

=== Television ===
| Year | Title | Role | Notes |
|---|---|---|---|
| 2006 | Untold Stories of the ER | Denver Haslam | Episode: "Elements of Danger" |
| 2007 | Ghost Whisperer: The Other Side | Danny | Recurring Cast |
| 2007 | Veronica Mars | Gorya 'Gory' Sorokin | Episode: "The Bitch Is Back" |
| 2007 | Big Shots | Mike | Episode: "The Way We Weren't" |
| 2009 | Eleventh Hour | Ben Adams | Episode: "Miracle" |
| 2009 | Cold Case | Norm Fawnshawe '67 | Episode: "The Brush Man" |
| 2009 | Lost | Cunningham | Recurring Cast: Season 5 |
| 2009 | The Forgotten | Dylan Dreslyn | Episode: "Parachute Jane" |
| 2010 | Sons of Anarchy | Mark Petrie | Episode : "Bainne" |
| 2010 | CSI: Miami | Process Server | Episode: "On the Hook" |
| 2011 | Bones | Matt Leishenger | Episode: "The Hole in the Heart" |
| 2011 | Law & Order: LA | Billy Russ | Episode: "Angel's Knoll" |
| 2011 | Rizzoli & Isles | Pvt. Gary Campbell | Episode: "We Don't Need Another Hero" |
| 2011 | NCIS | Navy Lieutenant Paul Booth | Episode: "The Penelope Papers" |
| 2012 | Criminal Minds | Herman Scobie | Episode: "Unknown Subject" |
| 2012 | Castle | Jason Bagwell | Episode: "A Dance with Death" |
| 2012 | Modern Family | Baby Class Student | Episode: "Schooled" |
| 2014 | Murder in the First | Mike Mulligan | Recurring Cast: Season 1 |
| 2014 | Stalker | Zack Thomas | Episode: "Phobia" |
| 2015 | The Mentalist | Kelvin Bittaker | Episode: "The Whites of His Eyes" |
| 2015 | The Night Shift | Brent Geisting | Episode: "Aftermath" |
| 2016 | NCIS: New Orleans | Troy Spooner | Episode: "Means to an End" |
| 2016 | Major Crimes | Vince Evans | Episode: "Foreign Affairs" |
| 2016 | Longmire | Hal | Episode: "From This Day Forward" |
| 2016 | Scorpion | Sam Roberts | Episode: "Wreck the Halls" |
| 2017 | Lethal Weapon | Officer Montero | Episode: "The Murtaugh File" |
| 2017 | Grey's Anatomy | David Fisher | Episode: "Leave It Inside" |
| 2017–19 | 13 Reasons Why | Seth Massey | Recurring Cast: Season 1-3 |
| 2018 | Timeless | Owen | Episode: "The Day Reagan Was Shot" |
| 2018–23 | Snowfall | Agent Stephen Havemeyer | Guest: Season 2, Recurring Cast: Season 3-6 |
| 2019 | Castle Rock | Chris Merrill | Main Cast: Season 2 |
| 2020 | Lovecraft Country | Deputy Eastchurch | Episode: "Sundown" |
| 2022 | 9-1-1: Lone Star | Mr. Conrad | Episode: "Child Care" |
| 2022 | S.W.A.T. | Lambert | Episode: "Cry Foul" |
| 2022 | Dahmer – Monster: The Jeffrey Dahmer Story | Officer Joseph Gabrish | Recurring Cast |
| 2022 | The Rookie | Ryan Davis | Episode: "Take Back" |
| 2023 | The Good Doctor | Sebastian | Episode: "A Beautiful Day" |
| 2024 | Chicago P.D. | Wes Arben | Episode: "Retread" |
| 2024 | Presumed Innocent | Dalton Caldwell | Recurring Cast |
| 2024 | Found | Ivan Samuels | Episode: "Missing White Lonely" |
| 2024 | FBI: Most Wanted | Denny Cobb | Episode: "Pig Butchering" |
| 2025 | NCIS: Origins | Master Sergeant Joshua Dane | Episode: "To Have and to Hold" |

=== Video games ===
| Year | Title | Role | Notes |
|---|---|---|---|
| 2011 | L.A. Noire | Walter Beckett | |
