= 1988 Pontiac Excitement 400 =

Second race of the 1988 NASCAR Winston Cup Series

Race details
- Race 2 of 29 in the 1988 NASCAR Winston Cup Series
- The 1988 Pontiac Excitement 400 program cover.
- Date: February 21, 1988
- Official name: 34th Annual Pontiac Excitement 400
- Location: Richmond, Virginia, Richmond Fairgrounds Raceway
- Course: Permanent racing facility
- Course length: 0.542 miles (0.872 km)
- Distance: 400 laps, 216.8 mi (348.905 km)
- Average speed: 66.401 miles per hour (106.862 km/h)

Pole position
Driver	Morgan Shepherd	Winkle Motorsports
- Time: 20.616

Most laps led
Driver	Dale Earnhardt	Richard Childress Racing
- Laps: 151

Winner
No. 75	Neil Bonnett	RahMoc Enterprises

Television in the United States
- Network: TBS
- Announcers: Ken Squier, Johnny Hayes

Radio in the United States
- Radio: Motor Racing Network

The 1988 Pontiac Excitement 400 was the second stock car race of the 1988 NASCAR Winston Cup Series season and the 34th iteration of the event. The race was held on Sunday, February 21, 1988, in Richmond, Virginia, at Richmond Fairgrounds Raceway, a 0.542 miles (0.872 km) D-shaped oval. The race took the scheduled 400 laps to complete. Coming back from a two lap deficit, RahMoc Enterprises driver Neil Bonnett would manage to pass for the lead on the final restart with 48 laps left in the race, coming back with the help of a long green flag stint to gain his first lap back, and a period of back-to-back cautions to regain his second lap. Bonnett would manage to lead the final 48 laps to take his 17th career NASCAR Winston Cup Series victory and his first victory of the season.

The victory was disputed by second place finisher, Ricky Rudd, and his team, King Racing. In an appeal filed by King Racing, the team stated that the three of Rudd, Richard Petty, and Darrell Waltrip all believed that Neil Bonnett had an accidental lap added to his total, with all three insisting that Bonnett had run no more than 399 laps of the race. In an investigation done by NASCAR and their chief scorer, Morris Metcalfe, they maintained the validity of Bonnett's victory on February 23. Metcalfe firmly stated that he believed Bonnett had earned his laps back, stating in the Winston-Salem Journal that "We had everything under control the whole way, and we never had any doubt about who was leading, or who'd gotten lapped, or how Neil Bonnett got his laps back."

The race was the final race using the former 0.542 miles (0.872 km) layout that Richmond Fairgrounds Raceway had been using at the time. The old track, one that was seen as an aging track and a track with few amenities, was being torn down in favor of a new, 0.75 miles (1.21 km) long D-shaped oval named Richmond International Raceway that would be built near the now-former location of Richmond Fairgrounds Raceway. The track was meant to be a more modern and expanded version of Richmond Fairgrounds Raceway, with more amenities and seats being added.

The race was the first victory that featured a car using the Hoosier Racing Tire brand, who had entered NASCAR in 1988 as a direct competitor towards the Goodyear Tire and Rubber Company, who prior to the 1988 season, had a monopoly on tires used in NASCAR since the 1971 season. The victory was not viewed as a major victory for Hoosier Racing Tire, with Bonnett not showing a commitment towards using the brand for the entirety of the 1988 season. Bonnett would state that "We came here and tried the Hoosiers, and we found them to be the best tire for this track... we're going to run the best tire available at each track. Who knows? We might not run another race this year on Hoosier tires."

== Background ==
Richmond International Raceway (RIR) is a 3/4-mile (1.2 km), D-shaped, asphalt race track located just outside Richmond, Virginia in Henrico County. It hosts the Monster Energy NASCAR Cup Series and Xfinity Series. Known as "America's premier short track", it formerly hosted a NASCAR Camping World Truck Series race, an IndyCar Series race, and two USAC sprint car races.

=== Entry list ===
- (R) denotes rookie driver.

#	Driver	Team	Make	Sponsor
2	Ernie Irvan (R)	U.S. Racing	Chevrolet	Kroger
3	Dale Earnhardt	Richard Childress Racing	Chevrolet	GM Goodwrench
03	Dave Pletcher Sr.	Weaver Racing	Ford	Wild Turkey Music
4	Rick Wilson	Morgan–McClure Motorsports	Oldsmobile	Kodak
5	Geoff Bodine	Hendrick Motorsports	Chevrolet	Levi Garrett
6	Mark Martin	Roush Racing	Ford	Stroh's Light
7	Alan Kulwicki	AK Racing	Ford	Zerex
07	Larry Moyer	Stark Racing	Pontiac	Just Say No!
8	Bobby Hillin Jr.	Stavola Brothers Racing	Buick	Miller High Life
9	Bill Elliott	Melling Racing	Ford	Coors Light
10	Ken Bouchard (R)	Whitcomb Racing	Ford	Whitcomb Racing
11	Terry Labonte	Junior Johnson & Associates	Chevrolet	Budweiser
12	Bobby Allison	Stavola Brothers Racing	Buick	Miller High Life
15	Brett Bodine	Bud Moore Engineering	Ford	Crisco
17	Darrell Waltrip	Hendrick Motorsports	Chevrolet	Tide
21	Kyle Petty	Wood Brothers Racing	Ford	Citgo
22	Lennie Pond	Hamby Racing	Chevrolet	Hamby Racing
25	Ken Schrader	Hendrick Motorsports	Chevrolet	Folgers
26	Ricky Rudd	King Racing	Buick	Quaker State
27	Rusty Wallace	Blue Max Racing	Pontiac	Kodiak
28	Davey Allison	Ranier-Lundy Racing	Ford	Texaco, Havoline
29	Dale Jarrett	Cale Yarborough Motorsports	Oldsmobile	Hardee's
30	Michael Waltrip	Bahari Racing	Pontiac	Country Time
31	Brad Teague	Bob Clark Motorsports	Oldsmobile	Slender You Figure Salons
33	Harry Gant	Mach 1 Racing	Chevrolet	Skoal Bandit
43	Richard Petty	Petty Enterprises	Pontiac	STP
44	Sterling Marlin	Hagan Racing	Oldsmobile	Piedmont Airlines
46	Glenn Moffat	Moffat Racing	Chevrolet	Moffat Racing
52	Jimmy Means	Jimmy Means Racing	Chevrolet	Eureka
55	Phil Parsons	Jackson Bros. Motorsports	Oldsmobile	Skoal, Crown Central Petroleum
67	Buddy Arrington (Note: After Ken Schrader failed to qualify using his Hendrick Motorsports entry, team owner Rick Hendrick would manage to buy out owner-driver Buddy Arrington's car for the race, using Arrington's car for driver points.)	Arrington Racing	Ford	Pannill Sweatshirts
68	Derrike Cope	Testa Racing	Ford	Purolator
71	Dave Marcis	Marcis Auto Racing	Chevrolet	Lifebuoy
75	Neil Bonnett	RahMoc Enterprises	Pontiac	Valvoline
76	Graham Taylor	Betty Taylor Racing	Ford	Car-Mate Trailers
83	Lake Speed	Speed Racing	Oldsmobile	Wynn's, Kmart
88	Buddy Baker	Baker–Schiff Racing	Oldsmobile	Red Baron Frozen Pizza
90	Benny Parsons	Donlavey Racing	Ford	Bull's-Eye Barbecue Sauce
97	Morgan Shepherd	Winkle Motorsports	Buick	AC Spark Plug
98	Ed Pimm	Curb Racing	Pontiac	Sunoco

== Qualifying ==
Qualifying was originally scheduled to be split into two rounds. The first round was scheduled to be held on Friday, February 19, at 3:00 PM EST. Originally, the first 20 positions were going to be determined by first round qualifying, with positions 21-30 meant to be determined the following day on Saturday, February 20. However, due to rain, the first round was cancelled. As a result, qualifying was condensed into one round for all starting grid spots in the race, which was run on Saturday. Depending on who needed it, a select amount of positions were given to cars who had not otherwise qualified but were high enough in owner's points; up to two were given.

Morgan Shepherd, driving for Winkle Motorsports, would win the pole, setting a time of 20.616 and an average speed of 94.645 miles per hour (152.316 km/h) in the first round.

Eight drivers would fail to qualify.

=== Full qualifying results ===
Pos.	#	Driver	Team	Make	Time	Speed
1	97	Morgan Shepherd	Winkle Motorsports	Buick	20.616	94.645
2	3	Dale Earnhardt	Richard Childress Racing	Chevrolet	20.659	94.448
3	75	Neil Bonnett	RahMoc Enterprises	Pontiac	20.689	94.311
4	27	Rusty Wallace	Blue Max Racing	Pontiac	20.689	94.311
5	7	Alan Kulwicki	AK Racing	Ford	20.691	94.302
6	33	Harry Gant	Mach 1 Racing	Chevrolet	20.723	94.156
7	6	Mark Martin	Roush Racing	Ford	20.724	94.152
8	5	Geoff Bodine	Hendrick Motorsports	Chevrolet	20.729	94.129
9	43	Richard Petty	Petty Enterprises	Pontiac	20.731	94.120
10	11	Terry Labonte	Junior Johnson & Associates	Chevrolet	20.737	94.093
11	17	Darrell Waltrip	Hendrick Motorsports	Chevrolet	20.780	93.898
12	90	Benny Parsons	Donlavey Racing	Ford	20.781	93.893
13	10	Ken Bouchard (R)	Whitcomb Racing	Ford	20.782	93.889
14	44	Sterling Marlin	Hagan Racing	Oldsmobile	20.794	93.835
15	28	Davey Allison	Ranier-Lundy Racing	Ford	20.804	93.790
16	9	Bill Elliott	Melling Racing	Ford	20.858	93.547
17	55	Phil Parsons	Jackson Bros. Motorsports	Oldsmobile	20.860	93.538
18	83	Lake Speed	Speed Racing	Oldsmobile	20.871	93.489
19	15	Brett Bodine	Bud Moore Engineering	Ford	20.879	93.453
20	8	Bobby Hillin Jr.	Stavola Brothers Racing	Buick	20.887	93.417
21	68	Derrike Cope	Testa Racing	Ford	20.887	93.417
22	26	Ricky Rudd	King Racing	Buick	20.902	93.350
23	31	Brad Teague	Bob Clark Motorsports	Oldsmobile	20.904	93.341
24	21	Kyle Petty	Wood Brothers Racing	Ford	20.943	93.167
25	12	Bobby Allison	Stavola Brothers Racing	Buick	20.981	92.998
26	30	Michael Waltrip	Bahari Racing	Pontiac	21.000	92.914
27	88	Buddy Baker	Baker–Schiff Racing	Oldsmobile	21.002	92.905
28	71	Dave Marcis	Marcis Auto Racing	Chevrolet	21.028	92.791
29	52	Jimmy Means	Jimmy Means Racing	Chevrolet	21.060	92.650
30	67	Buddy Arrington	Arrington Racing	Ford	21.104	92.456
Provisionals
31	22	Lennie Pond	Hamby Racing	Chevrolet	21.169	92.173
32	29	Dale Jarrett	Cale Yarborough Motorsports	Oldsmobile	21.116	92.404
Failed to qualify
33	4	Rick Wilson	Morgan–McClure Motorsports	Oldsmobile	-*	-*
34	25	Ken Schrader	Hendrick Motorsports	Chevrolet	21.228	91.916
35	2	Ernie Irvan (R)	U.S. Racing	Chevrolet	-*	-*
36	98	Ed Pimm	Curb Racing	Pontiac	-*	-*
37	03	Dave Pletcher Sr.	Weaver Racing	Ford	-*	-*
38	76	Graham Taylor	Betty Taylor Racing	Ford	-*	-*
39	07	Larry Moyer	Stark Racing	Pontiac	-*	-*
40	46	Glenn Moffat	Moffat Racing	Chevrolet	-*	-*
Official first round qualifying results

== Race results ==
Fin	St	#	Driver	Team	Make	Laps	Led	Status	Pts	Winnings
1	3	75	Neil Bonnett	RahMoc Enterprises	Pontiac	400	141	running	180	$45,900
2	22	26	Ricky Rudd	King Racing	Buick	400	0	running	170	$25,660
3	9	43	Richard Petty	Petty Enterprises	Pontiac	400	0	running	165	$16,975
4	11	17	Darrell Waltrip	Hendrick Motorsports	Chevrolet	400	39	running	165	$14,185
5	14	44	Sterling Marlin	Hagan Racing	Oldsmobile	400	0	running	155	$12,315
6	18	83	Lake Speed	Speed Racing	Oldsmobile	400	67	running	155	$5,290
7	4	27	Rusty Wallace	Blue Max Racing	Pontiac	400	0	running	146	$11,790
8	20	8	Bobby Hillin Jr.	Stavola Brothers Racing	Buick	399	0	running	142	$6,550
9	10	11	Terry Labonte	Junior Johnson & Associates	Chevrolet	399	1	running	143	$9,320
10	2	3	Dale Earnhardt	Richard Childress Racing	Chevrolet	399	151	running	144	$16,245
11	25	12	Bobby Allison	Stavola Brothers Racing	Buick	399	0	running	130	$8,795
12	16	9	Bill Elliott	Melling Racing	Ford	399	0	running	127	$10,595
13	8	5	Geoff Bodine	Hendrick Motorsports	Chevrolet	398	0	running	124	$5,305
14	12	90	Benny Parsons	Donlavey Racing	Ford	398	0	running	121	$5,125
15	27	88	Buddy Baker	Baker–Schiff Racing	Oldsmobile	398	0	running	118	$5,505
16	1	97	Morgan Shepherd	Winkle Motorsports	Buick	398	1	running	120	$8,025
17	28	71	Dave Marcis	Marcis Auto Racing	Chevrolet	397	0	running	112	$4,450
18	24	21	Kyle Petty	Wood Brothers Racing	Ford	397	0	running	109	$8,075
19	23	31	Brad Teague	Bob Clark Motorsports	Oldsmobile	395	0	running	106	$1,835
20	30	67	Ken Schrader	Arrington Racing	Ford	395	0	running	103	$4,610
21	5	7	Alan Kulwicki	AK Racing	Ford	393	0	crank	100	$4,045
22	31	22	Lennie Pond	Hamby Racing	Chevrolet	383	0	running	0	$2,375
23	13	10	Ken Bouchard (R)	Whitcomb Racing	Ford	380	0	running	94	$2,365
24	29	52	Jimmy Means	Jimmy Means Racing	Chevrolet	374	0	running	91	$3,755
25	7	6	Mark Martin	Roush Racing	Ford	364	0	running	88	$1,645
26	32	29	Dale Jarrett	Cale Yarborough Motorsports	Oldsmobile	337	0	crash	85	$1,510
27	19	15	Brett Bodine	Bud Moore Engineering	Ford	325	0	running	82	$9,275
28	6	33	Harry Gant	Mach 1 Racing	Chevrolet	289	0	crash	79	$4,430
29	15	28	Davey Allison	Ranier-Lundy Racing	Ford	276	0	running	76	$10,055
30	17	55	Phil Parsons	Jackson Bros. Motorsports	Oldsmobile	225	0	running	73	$3,420
31	26	30	Michael Waltrip	Bahari Racing	Pontiac	110	0	engine	70	$2,820
32	21	68	Derrike Cope	Testa Racing	Ford	47	0	crash	67	$2,820
Failed to qualify
33		4	Rick Wilson	Morgan–McClure Motorsports	Oldsmobile					
34		25	Ken Schrader	Hendrick Motorsports	Chevrolet					
35		2	Ernie Irvan (R)	U.S. Racing	Chevrolet					
36		98	Ed Pimm	Curb Racing	Pontiac					
37		03	Dave Pletcher Sr.	Weaver Racing	Ford					
38		76	Graham Taylor	Betty Taylor Racing	Ford					
39		07	Larry Moyer	Stark Racing	Pontiac					
40		46	Glenn Moffat	Moffat Racing	Chevrolet					
Official race results

== Standings after the race ==
Drivers' Championship standings

	Pos	Driver	Points
3	1	Neil Bonnett	345
1	2	Bobby Allison	315 (-30)
2	3	Terry Labonte	303 (-42)
4	4	Sterling Marlin	302 (–43)
6	5	Darrell Waltrip	300 (–45)
1	6	Rusty Wallace	297 (–48)
2	7	Dale Earnhardt	283 (–62)
9	8	Ricky Rudd	282 (–63)
4	9	Bobby Hillin Jr.	266 (–79)
4	10	Ken Schrader	258 (–87)
Official driver's standings

- Note: Only the first 10 positions are included for the driver standings.

== Notes ==
Previous race: 1988 Daytona 500	NASCAR Winston Cup Series; 1988 season	Next race: 1988 Goodwrench 500
