= 1988 Goodwrench 500 =

Third race of the 1988 NASCAR Winston Cup Series

Race details
- Race 3 of 29 in the 1988 NASCAR Winston Cup Series
- The 1988 GM Goodwrench 500 program cover, featuring Dale Earnhardt.
- Date: March 6, 1988
- Official name: 23rd Annual Goodwrench 500
- Location: Rockingham, North Carolina, North Carolina Motor Speedway
- Course: Permanent racing facility
- Course length: 1.017 miles (1.637 km)
- Distance: 492 laps, 500.364 mi (805.257 km)
- Scheduled distance: 492 laps, 500.364 mi (805.257 km)
- Average speed: 120.159 miles per hour (193.377 km/h)
- Attendance: 53,600

Pole position
Driver	Bill Elliott	Melling Racing
- Time: 24.972

Most laps led
Driver	Neil Bonnett	RahMoc Enterprises
- Laps: 166

Winner
No. 75	Neil Bonnett	RahMoc Enterprises

Television in the United States
- Network: ESPN
- Announcers: Bob Jenkins, Gary Nelson, Ned Jarrett

Radio in the United States
- Radio: Motor Racing Network

The 1988 Goodwrench 500 was the third stock car race of the 1988 NASCAR Winston Cup Series season and the 23rd iteration of the event. The race was held on Sunday, March 6, 1988, before an audience of 53,600 in Rockingham, North Carolina, at North Carolina Motor Speedway, a 1.017 miles (1.637 km) permanent high-banked racetrack. The race took the scheduled 492 laps to complete. In the closing laps of the race, RahMoc Enterprises driver Neil Bonnett would manage to make a late-race charge to the lead, passing for the lead with 20 laps left in the race to take his 18th and final career NASCAR Winston Cup Series victory and his second and final victory of the season. To fill out the top three, owner-driver Lake Speed and Hagan Racing driver Sterling Marlin would finish second and third, respectively.

The victory was the second NASCAR Winston Cup victory for tire company Hoosier Racing Tire, who had entered the series as a direct competitor to the Goodyear Tire and Rubber Company starting at the 1988 Daytona 500. With this victory, Hoosier Racing Tire had managed to earn three straight victories, including an exhibition race victory at the 1988 Goodyear NASCAR 500 at Calder Park Raceway; all with Neil Bonnett. The feat was considered a major victory for Hoosier Racing Tire for two main reasons; the first was that before the 1988 season, Goodyear had a monopoly on NASCAR's tire supply since the 1971 season. The second was that for the entirety of the race itself, the contenders for the race victory all exclusively used Hoosier tires. In interviews, CEO of Hoosier Racing Tire, Bob Newton would both praise Hoosier and taunt Goodyear, stating that "This wasn't just a win, this was a runaway."

== Background ==
The layout of North Carolina Motor Speedway, the venue where the race was held.

North Carolina Motor Speedway was opened as a flat, one-mile oval on October 31, 1965. In 1969, the track was extensively reconfigured to a high-banked, D-shaped oval just over one mile in length. In 1997, North Carolina Motor Speedway merged with Penske Motorsports, and was renamed North Carolina Speedway. Shortly thereafter, the infield was reconfigured, and competition on the infield road course, mostly by the SCCA, was discontinued. Currently, the track is home to the Fast Track High Performance Driving School.

=== Entry list ===
- (R) denotes rookie driver.

#	Driver	Team	Make	Sponsor
01	Mickey Gibbs	Gibbs Racing	Ford	Gibbs–West Tractor
2	Ernie Irvan (R)	U.S. Racing	Chevrolet	Kroger
02	Howard Mark	Mark Racing	Chevrolet	Deland Truck Center
3	Dale Earnhardt	Richard Childress Racing	Chevrolet	GM Goodwrench
03	Dave Pletcher Sr.	Weaver Racing	Ford	Wild Turkey Music
4	Rick Wilson	Morgan–McClure Motorsports	Oldsmobile	Kodak
5	Geoff Bodine	Hendrick Motorsports	Chevrolet	Levi Garrett
6	Mark Martin	Roush Racing	Ford	Stroh's Light
7	Alan Kulwicki	AK Racing	Ford	Zerex
8	Bobby Hillin Jr.	Stavola Brothers Racing	Buick	Miller High Life
9	Bill Elliott	Melling Racing	Ford	Coors Light
10	Ken Bouchard (R)	Whitcomb Racing	Ford	Whitcomb Racing
11	Terry Labonte	Junior Johnson & Associates	Chevrolet	Budweiser
12	Bobby Allison	Stavola Brothers Racing	Buick	Miller High Life
13	D. Wayne Strout	Strout Racing	Oldsmobile	Greyhound Package Experience
15	Brett Bodine	Bud Moore Engineering	Ford	Crisco
17	Darrell Waltrip	Hendrick Motorsports	Chevrolet	Tide
21	Kyle Petty	Wood Brothers Racing	Ford	Citgo
22	Steve Moore	Hamby Racing	Chevrolet	Hamby Racing
23	Eddie Bierschwale	B&B Racing	Chevrolet	Wayne Paging
25	Ken Schrader	Hendrick Motorsports	Chevrolet	Folgers
26	Ricky Rudd	King Racing	Buick	Quaker State
27	Rusty Wallace	Blue Max Racing	Pontiac	Kodiak
28	Davey Allison	Ranier-Lundy Racing	Ford	Texaco, Havoline
29	Dale Jarrett	Cale Yarborough Motorsports	Oldsmobile	Hardee's
30	Michael Waltrip	Bahari Racing	Pontiac (Note: Waltrip's initial entry was with a Pontiac, only to crash that car in practice; resulting in Waltrip qualifying and running the race in a Chevrolet.)	Country Time
31	Brad Teague	Bob Clark Motorsports	Oldsmobile	Slender You Figure Salons
33	Harry Gant	Mach 1 Racing	Chevrolet	Skoal Bandit
43	Richard Petty	Petty Enterprises	Pontiac	STP
44	Sterling Marlin	Hagan Racing	Oldsmobile	Piedmont Airlines
45	Billy Fulcher	Fulcher Racing	Pontiac	Fulcher Racing
48	Tony Spanos	Hylton Motorsports	Chevrolet	Hylton Motorsports
52	Jimmy Means	Jimmy Means Racing	Chevrolet	Eureka
55	Phil Parsons	Jackson Bros. Motorsports	Oldsmobile	Skoal, Crown Central Petroleum
67	Rick Jeffrey	Arrington Racing	Ford	Pannill Sweatshirts
68	Derrike Cope	Testa Racing	Ford	Purolator
71	Dave Marcis	Marcis Auto Racing	Chevrolet	Lifebuoy
75	Neil Bonnett	RahMoc Enterprises	Pontiac	Valvoline
82	Mark Stahl	Stahl Racing	Ford	Auto Bell Car Wash
83	Lake Speed	Speed Racing	Oldsmobile	Wynn's, Kmart
88	Buddy Baker	Baker–Schiff Racing	Oldsmobile	Red Baron Frozen Pizza
90	Benny Parsons	Donlavey Racing	Ford	Bull's-Eye Barbecue Sauce
93	Charlie Baker	Salmon Racing	Chevrolet	Salmon Racing
97	Morgan Shepherd	Winkle Motorsports	Buick	AC Spark Plug
98	Ed Pimm	Curb Racing	Pontiac	Sunoco

== Qualifying ==
Qualifying was split into two rounds. The first round was held on Thursday, March 3, at 2:30 PM EST. Each driver would have one lap to set a time. During the first round, the top 20 drivers in the round would be guaranteed a starting spot in the race. If a driver was not able to guarantee a spot in the first round, they had the option to scrub their time from the first round and try and run a faster lap time in a second round qualifying run, held on Friday, March 4, at 2:00 PM EST. As with the first round, each driver would have one lap to set a time. For this specific race, positions 21-40 would be decided on time, and depending on who needed it, a select amount of positions were given to cars who had not otherwise qualified but were high enough in owner's points; up to two were given.

Bill Elliott, driving for Melling Racing, would win the pole, setting a time of 24.972 and an average speed of 146.612 miles per hour (235.949 km/h) in the first round.

Four drivers would fail to qualify.

=== Full qualifying results ===
Pos.	#	Driver	Team	Make	Time	Speed
1	9	Bill Elliott	Melling Racing	Ford	24.972	146.612
2	7	Alan Kulwicki	AK Racing	Ford	25.039	146.220
3	26	Ricky Rudd	King Racing	Buick	25.081	145.975
4	28	Davey Allison	Ranier-Lundy Racing	Ford	25.091	145.917
5	25	Ken Schrader	Hendrick Motorsports	Chevrolet	25.124	145.725
6	27	Rusty Wallace	Blue Max Racing	Pontiac	25.168	145.470
7	29	Dale Jarrett	Cale Yarborough Motorsports	Oldsmobile	25.225	145.142
8	5	Geoff Bodine	Hendrick Motorsports	Chevrolet	25.256	144.964
9	33	Harry Gant	Mach 1 Racing	Chevrolet	25.280	144.826
10	11	Terry Labonte	Junior Johnson & Associates	Chevrolet	25.286	144.792
11	17	Darrell Waltrip	Hendrick Motorsports	Chevrolet	25.288	144.780
12	6	Mark Martin	Roush Racing	Ford	25.315	144.626
13	21	Kyle Petty	Wood Brothers Racing	Ford	25.318	144.609
14	44	Sterling Marlin	Hagan Racing	Oldsmobile	25.349	144.432
15	15	Brett Bodine	Bud Moore Engineering	Ford	25.394	144.176
16	8	Bobby Hillin Jr.	Stavola Brothers Racing	Buick	25.438	143.926
17	10	Ken Bouchard (R)	Whitcomb Racing	Ford	25.447	143.876
18	55	Phil Parsons	Jackson Bros. Motorsports	Oldsmobile	25.529	143.413
19	83	Lake Speed	Speed Racing	Oldsmobile	25.552	143.284
20	43	Richard Petty	Petty Enterprises	Pontiac	25.570	143.183
Failed to lock in Round 1
21	2	Ernie Irvan (R)	U.S. Racing	Chevrolet	25.572	143.172
22	3	Dale Earnhardt	Richard Childress Racing	Chevrolet	25.579	143.133
23	12	Bobby Allison	Stavola Brothers Racing	Buick	25.642	142.781
24	71	Dave Marcis	Marcis Auto Racing	Chevrolet	25.671	142.620
25	01	Mickey Gibbs	Gibbs Racing	Ford	25.686	142.537
26	4	Rick Wilson	Morgan–McClure Motorsports	Oldsmobile	25.728	142.304
27	88	Buddy Baker	Baker–Schiff Racing	Oldsmobile	25.772	142.061
28	98	Ed Pimm	Curb Racing	Buick	25.788	141.973
29	31	Brad Teague	Bob Clark Motorsports	Oldsmobile	25.789	141.968
30	75	Neil Bonnett	RahMoc Enterprises	Pontiac	25.907	141.321
31	23	Eddie Bierschwale	B&B Racing	Chevrolet	25.914	141.283
32	90	Benny Parsons	Donlavey Racing	Ford	25.943	141.125
33	67	Rick Jeffrey	Arrington Racing	Ford	26.031	140.648
34	52	Jimmy Means	Jimmy Means Racing	Pontiac	26.039	140.604
35	97	Morgan Shepherd	Winkle Motorsports	Buick	26.077	140.400
36	68	Derrike Cope	Testa Racing	Ford	26.202	139.730
37	30	Michael Waltrip	Bahari Racing	Chevrolet	26.205	139.714
38	03	Dave Pletcher Sr.	Weaver Racing	Ford	26.211	139.682
39	82	Mark Stahl	Stahl Racing	Ford	26.270	139.368
40	93	Charlie Baker	Salmon Racing	Chevrolet	26.449	138.425
Provisional
41	22	Steve Moore	Hamby Racing	Chevrolet	-*	-*
Failed to qualify
42	13	D. Wayne Strout	Strout Racing	Oldsmobile	-*	-*
43	48	Tony Spanos	Hylton Motorsports	Chevrolet	-*	-*
44	45	Billy Fulcher	Fulcher Racing	Pontiac	-*	-*
45	02	Howard Mark	Mark Racing	Chevrolet	-*	-*
Official first round qualifying results
Official starting lineup

== Race results ==
Fin	St	#	Driver	Team	Make	Laps	Led	Status	Pts	Winnings
1	30	75	Neil Bonnett	RahMoc Enterprises	Pontiac	492	166	running	185	$45,800
2	19	83	Lake Speed	Speed Racing	Oldsmobile	492	51	running	175	$22,310
3	14	44	Sterling Marlin	Hagan Racing	Oldsmobile	492	103	running	170	$19,195
4	2	7	Alan Kulwicki	AK Racing	Ford	492	0	running	160	$14,330
5	22	3	Dale Earnhardt	Richard Childress Racing	Chevrolet	492	22	running	160	$19,865
6	1	9	Bill Elliott	Melling Racing	Ford	491	112	running	155	$17,910
7	35	97	Morgan Shepherd	Winkle Motorsports	Buick	491	6	running	151	$7,710
8	17	10	Ken Bouchard (R)	Whitcomb Racing	Ford	491	0	running	142	$5,760
9	4	28	Davey Allison	Ranier-Lundy Racing	Ford	491	0	running	138	$14,210
10	5	25	Ken Schrader	Hendrick Motorsports	Chevrolet	490	0	running	134	$12,785
11	27	88	Buddy Baker	Baker–Schiff Racing	Oldsmobile	490	22	running	135	$9,170
12	12	6	Mark Martin	Roush Racing	Ford	489	0	running	127	$4,120
13	37	30	Michael Waltrip	Bahari Racing	Chevrolet	489	0	running	124	$7,920
14	6	27	Rusty Wallace	Blue Max Racing	Pontiac	489	0	running	121	$12,520
15	18	55	Phil Parsons	Jackson Bros. Motorsports	Oldsmobile	488	0	running	118	$7,970
16	7	29	Dale Jarrett	Cale Yarborough Motorsports	Oldsmobile	488	0	running	115	$3,370
17	3	26	Ricky Rudd	King Racing	Buick	487	0	running	112	$7,120
18	8	5	Geoff Bodine	Hendrick Motorsports	Chevrolet	487	0	running	109	$6,670
19	13	21	Kyle Petty	Wood Brothers Racing	Ford	487	0	running	106	$9,870
20	36	68	Derrike Cope	Testa Racing	Ford	486	0	running	103	$6,770
21	16	8	Bobby Hillin Jr.	Stavola Brothers Racing	Buick	486	0	running	100	$5,665
22	23	12	Bobby Allison	Stavola Brothers Racing	Buick	484	0	running	97	$9,490
23	24	71	Dave Marcis	Marcis Auto Racing	Chevrolet	481	0	running	94	$5,965
24	11	17	Darrell Waltrip	Hendrick Motorsports	Chevrolet	481	0	running	91	$9,315
25	21	2	Ernie Irvan (R)	U.S. Racing	Chevrolet	479	0	running	88	$3,290
26	33	67	Rick Jeffrey	Arrington Racing	Ford	476	0	running	85	$5,065
27	15	15	Brett Bodine	Bud Moore Engineering	Ford	470	0	running	82	$10,740
28	9	33	Harry Gant	Mach 1 Racing	Chevrolet	469	0	running	79	$4,840
29	38	03	Dave Pletcher Sr.	Weaver Racing	Ford	464	0	running	76	$2,015
30	41	22	Steve Moore	Hamby Racing	Chevrolet	413	0	running	73	$2,665
31	10	11	Terry Labonte	Junior Johnson & Associates	Chevrolet	407	4	valve	75	$8,915
32	31	23	Eddie Bierschwale	B&B Racing	Chevrolet	407	0	running	67	$1,865
33	32	90	Benny Parsons	Donlavey Racing	Ford	387	0	running	64	$4,520
34	28	98	Ed Pimm	Curb Racing	Buick	311	0	crash	61	$1,745
35	25	01	Mickey Gibbs	Gibbs Racing	Ford	236	0	engine	58	$1,695
36	26	4	Rick Wilson	Morgan–McClure Motorsports	Oldsmobile	234	6	engine	60	$2,290
37	39	82	Mark Stahl	Stahl Racing	Ford	233	0	valve	52	$1,615
38	40	93	Charlie Baker	Salmon Racing	Chevrolet	136	0	clutch	49	$1,590
39	29	31	Brad Teague	Bob Clark Motorsports	Oldsmobile	99	0	engine	46	$1,565
40	34	52	Jimmy Means	Jimmy Means Racing	Pontiac	86	0	engine	43	$4,165
41	20	43	Richard Petty	Petty Enterprises	Pontiac	17	0	crash	40	$4,140
Failed to qualify
42		13	D. Wayne Strout	Strout Racing	Oldsmobile					
43		48	Tony Spanos	Hylton Motorsports	Chevrolet					
44		45	Billy Fulcher	Fulcher Racing	Pontiac					
45		02	Howard Mark	Mark Racing	Chevrolet					
Official race results

== Standings after the race ==
Drivers' Championship standings

	Pos	Driver	Points
	1	Neil Bonnett	530
2	2	Sterling Marlin	472 (-58)
4	3	Dale Earnhardt	443 (-87)
2	4	Rusty Wallace	418 (–112)
3	5	Bobby Allison	412 (–118)
6	6	Bill Elliott	409 (–121)
1	7	Ricky Rudd	394 (–136)
2	8	Ken Schrader	392 (–138)
4	9	Darrell Waltrip	391 (–139)
1	10	Buddy Baker	391 (–139)
Official driver's standings

- Note: Only the first 10 positions are included for the driver standings.

== Notes ==
Previous race: 1988 Pontiac Excitement 400	NASCAR Winston Cup Series; 1988 season	Next race: 1988 Motorcraft Quality Parts 500
