= Fulger =

Fulger is a surname. Notable people with the surname include:

- Holly Fulger (born 1956), American actress
- Mircea Fulger (born 1959), Romanian light-welterweight boxer

== See also ==
- Folger
