= Richmond Raceway =

Motorsport track in the United States

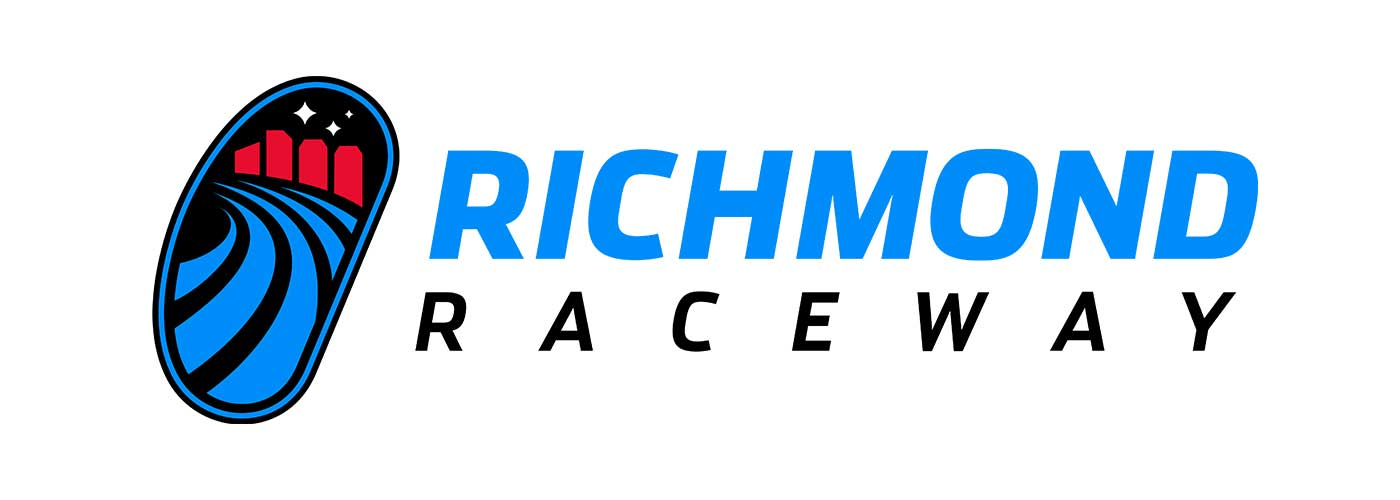

- D-shaped Oval (1988−present)
- Location: 600 East Laburnum Avenue; Richmond, Virginia, United States; 23222
- Coordinates: 37°35′30.08″N 77°25′15.28″W
- Capacity: Exact figure unknown; less than 50,000
- Owner: NASCAR (2019–present); International Speedway Corporation (1999–2019)
- Opened: 11 October 1946; 80 years ago
- Construction cost: $10,000 USD
- Former names: Richmond International Raceway (1988–2017); Richmond Fairgrounds Raceway (1969–1988); No official name (1946–1968)
- Major events: Current: NASCAR Cup Series; Cook Out 400 (1958–present); Toyota Owners 400 (1953, 1955–1957, 1959–2019, 2021–2024); NASCAR Truck Series; Black's Tire 250 (1995–2005, 2020–2026); Future: NASCAR O'Reilly Auto Parts Series; ToyotaCare 250 (1982–1984, 1990–2020, 2022–2024, 2027); Go Bowling 250 (1982–2021); Former: IndyCar Series; Indy Richmond 300 (2001–2009); NASCAR K&N Pro Series East; UNOH 100 (2011–2015)
- Website: richmondraceway.com

D-Shaped Oval (1988–present)
- Surface: Asphalt
- Length: 0.750 mi (1.207 km)
- Turns: 4
- Banking: Turns: 14° Frontstretch: 8° Backstretch: 2°
- Race lap record: 0:15.9368 seconds (169.423 mph) ( (United States) Sam Hornish Jr., Dallara IR-03, 2004, IndyCar)

Richmond Raceway (formerly known as the Richmond International Raceway from 1988 to 2017 and as the Richmond Fairgrounds Raceway from 1969 to 1988) is a 0.750 mi (1.207 km) D-shaped oval short track in Richmond, Virginia, United States. It has hosted major races since its inaugural season of racing in 1946, including NASCAR and IndyCar races. The track is owned by NASCAR and led by track president Lori Collier Waran.

Initially built in 1946 as part of the Atlantic Rural Exposition (now known as the State Fair of Virginia), the track initially held horse and open-wheel racing. In the following decades, the track hosted annual NASCAR races. Starting in the early 1970s, the track declined in its condition, leading to numerous racetrack proposals being made to replace the track. After all proposals failed, in 1988, the track was expanded into a 0.750 mi (1.207 km) and underwent mass expansion over the following years. Heading into the 2000s, the facility was bought out by the France family. Starting in the 2010s, the track significantly downsized, reducing seating capacity to less than half of its peak.

== Description ==
=== Configuration ===
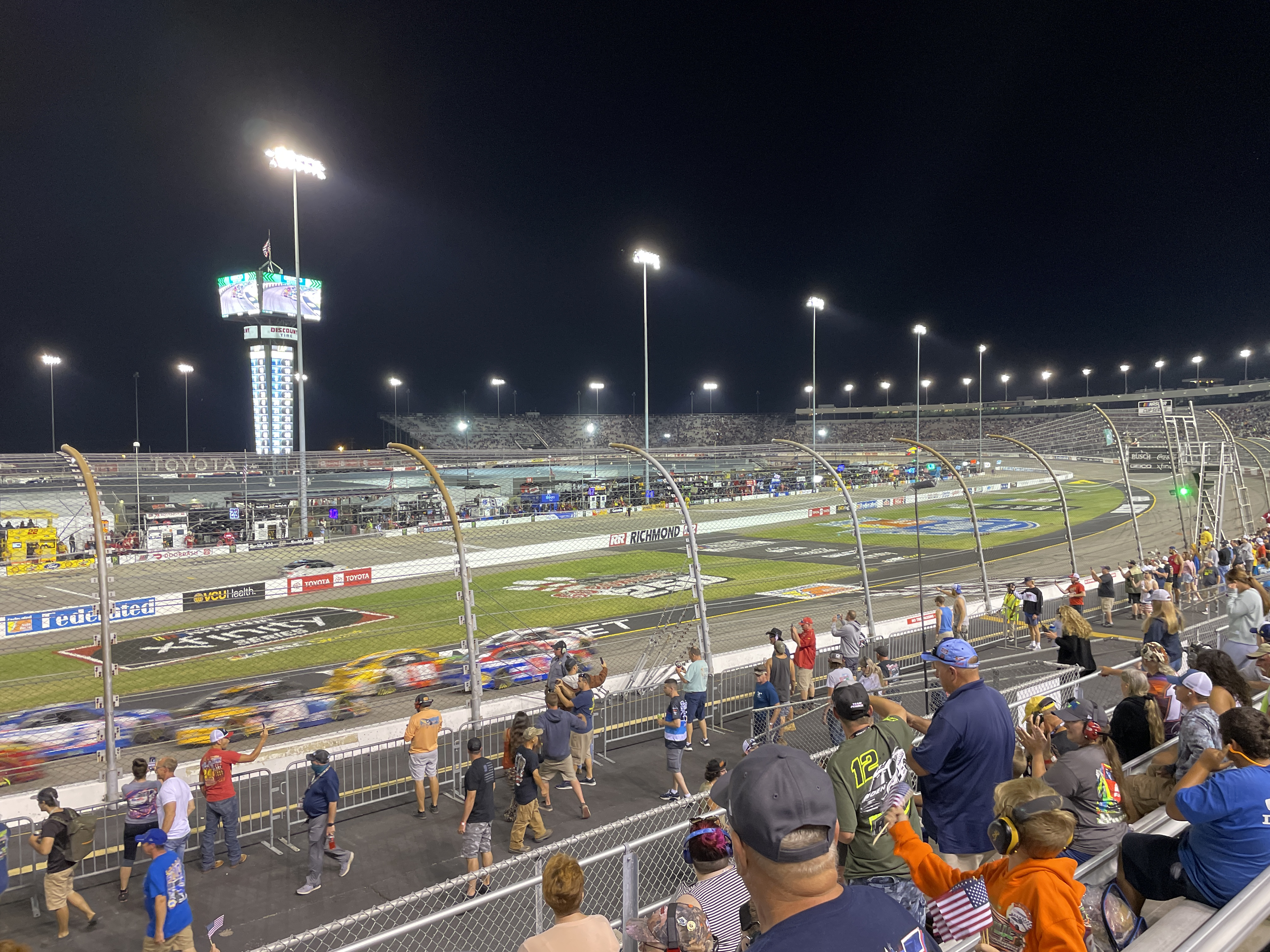
Richmond Raceway, pictured in 2021.

Richmond Raceway in its current form is measured at 0.750 mi (1.207 km), with 14° of banking in the track's turns, 8° of banking on the frontstretch, and 2° of banking on the backstretch. When the track was initially built, it was originally a 0.5 mi (0.80 km) true oval with a dirt surface. It was later paved in 1968 before being remodeled 20 years later to its current layout.

=== Amenities ===
Richmond Raceway is located in Richmond, Virginia, and is served by Interstate 64 and U.S. Route 360. The exact capacity of Richmond Raceway is unknown; according to a 2024 Richmond Times-Dispatch report, capacity is estimated to be "under 50,000". The last recorded capacity number was 51,000 seats, which was given in 2018. In total, the track complex covers approximately 575 acres (233 ha) of land according to a 2021 Richmond BizSense report.

== Track history ==
=== Early exposition years ===
==== Planning and construction ====
In June 1942 and in the midst of World War II, the Virginia State Fair Association bought a 460-acre (190 ha) plot of land used by a farm named Strawberry Hill. According to local media, the purchase was made due to fears of the State Fair being kicked out of their original location because of the United States Department of War potentially buying out the original location for war purposes. However, the following month, the moving of the original grandstands and fair buildings to the Strawberry Hill location was delayed until at least 1943 due to war efforts. The moving of the main grandstands was further delayed by another year before work on transferring the main fair grandstand to the Strawberry Hill location begun in 1944. In 1945, the now-named Atlantic Rural Exposition (ARE) was announced as an agriculture trade show to take place sometime in the fall of 1946 pending if WWII had ended before then. By May, $50,000 (adjusted for inflation, $894,177) was raised to start the exposition.

Three months later, a planning outline for the exposition was released in the Richmond Times-Dispatch. Plans for the ARE included a 7,000-seat coliseum, an amphitheater, and a steeplechase track. In February 1946, an exposition budget of $300,000 (adjusted for inflation, $4,953,072) was approved by the exposition's board of directors; the budget included plans to build a 1/2 mi (0.80 km) race track for $10,000. The following month, dates for the ARE were given, with it scheduled for October 7–12. The race track was completed by June 1946, with ARE organizers stating hopes to host both harness, automobile, and motorcycle races on the oval. The first automobile race at the race track was later announced for October 12, the last day of the exposition. At the time of its opening, the track's grandstands had a capacity of 3,200.

==== Early years of operation ====
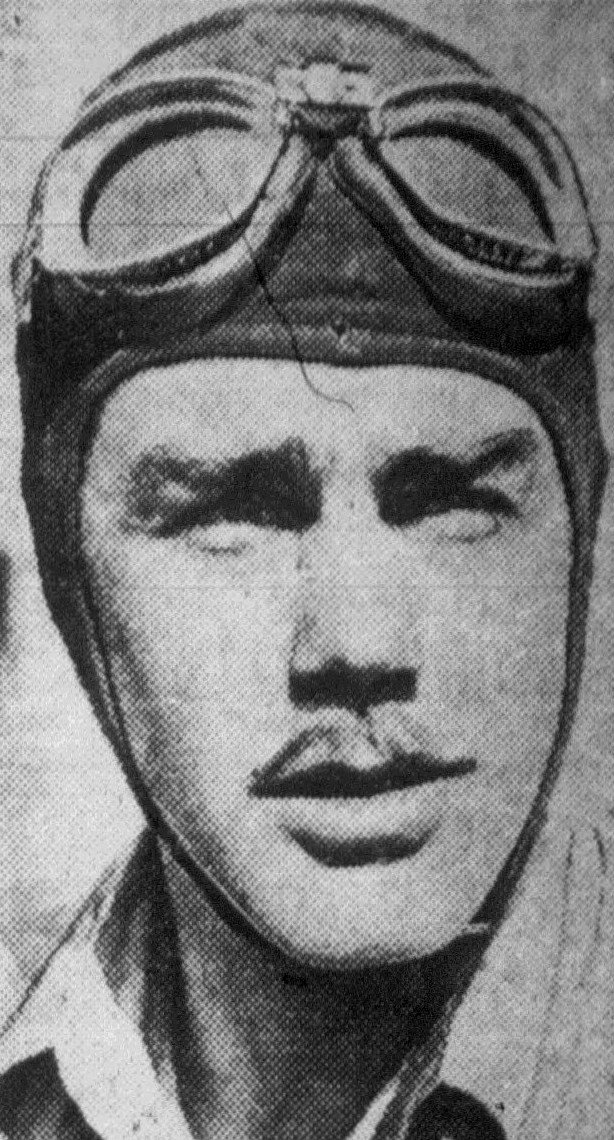
Racing driver Ted Horn (circa 1933) won the first automobile event at Richmond Raceway.

The inaugural ARE opened as scheduled on October 7. Although harness races were scheduled two days after the exposition's opening, the races were delayed by two days due to rain. The track officially opened to the public on October 11, 1946, to host the postponed harness races, with horse Empire Grattan winning the first feature race. The first automobile races were run as scheduled a day later, with Ted Horn winning the event. The following month, the track held its first races under the sanction of the American Automobile Association (AAA). In May 1947, the first motorcycle races were held at the facility.

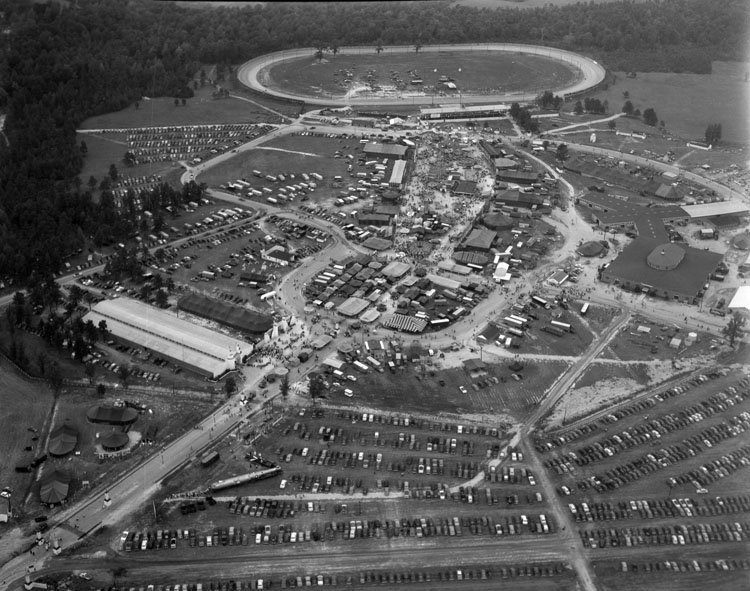
An overhead photo of the Atlantic Rural Exposition in 1952. The racing track is located at the top of the image.

The following year, the track underwent a series of renovations, with numerous amenities being added. Renovations included a lighting system to host night racing, a wooden fence built around the track, and an increase in seating capacity. The first night race was later ran on May 19 of that year. In 1950, the track experienced its first fatality after spectator Charles Malcolm Little was hit in the head from a loose tire on September 31, dying from complications from his injuries on October 23. In 1953, the track held its first NASCAR Grand National Series (now known as the NASCAR Cup Series) race on April 19, with Lee Petty winning the event. Two years afterward, eventual longtime promoter Paul Sawyer began promoting races at the facility alongside Joe Weatherly, buying out Weatherly's share of the promoting lease a year later for $5,000. In 1958, the track oversaw its second fatality after racing driver Gwyn Staley crashed during a NASCAR Convertible Division event, dying from numerous injuries. The track increased its seating capacity in 1962, adding "some 4,200" seats in the track's first and fourth turns to increase its seating capacity from 4,800 to approximately 9,000. In addition, the track's pit area was also renovated alongside the installation of a new scoreboard and protective walls and guardrails.

=== Paving, years of disrepair, and failed replacement proposals ===
In August 1968, track officials announced the paving of the track, which was completed in early September. The first race on the paved surface took place on September 9 for a NASCAR Grand National Series race. In the first couple of years for the paved surface, the track length was disputed on whether if it was a true half-mile; a dispute that had existed since the track's infancy. Immediately after the track's paving, the track length was lengthened to 0.542 mi (0.872 km). However, in March 1969, the track was again reclassified as a half-mile track. Just five months after the reclassification to a half-mile, the track length of the now-named Fairgrounds Raceway was readjusted once again to 0.542 mi. In 1972, the lower lanes in the second and fourth turns were repaved. In addition, the pit road length was extended in both ways.

==== Colonial–America Raceway proposal ====
Starting in the early 1970s, Fairgrounds Raceway was criticized for inadequate and dated fan facilities alongside a lack of seating capacity for the track's high demand of spectators. In addition, the track was considered one of the poorest in terms of purse money offered in the Cup Series circuit during that time, with a 1974 Times-Dispatch report stating that only Bristol, Nashville, and North Wilkesboro offered lower purses. In response to the declining condition of the track, Fairgrounds Raceway co-promoters Ken Campbell and Paul Sawyer began drafting plans to build a racetrack in Prince George County for "somewhere in the $6 million range", with the proposal being leaked by the Times-Dispatch on August 19, 1973. In the official press conference to reveal plans for the proposed track later held that month, Sawyer announced that the track was planned to host a permanent seating capacity of 50,000, have 16–18° banked turns, and have a track length of 1.75 mi (2.82 km). Despite the announcement, co-promoter Ken Campbell stated that they had no intentions of abandoning the Fairgrounds Raceway, but admitted that "I'm not sure exactly what we will do at this point". He later added that he considered to let the track transition to holding only local weekly races.

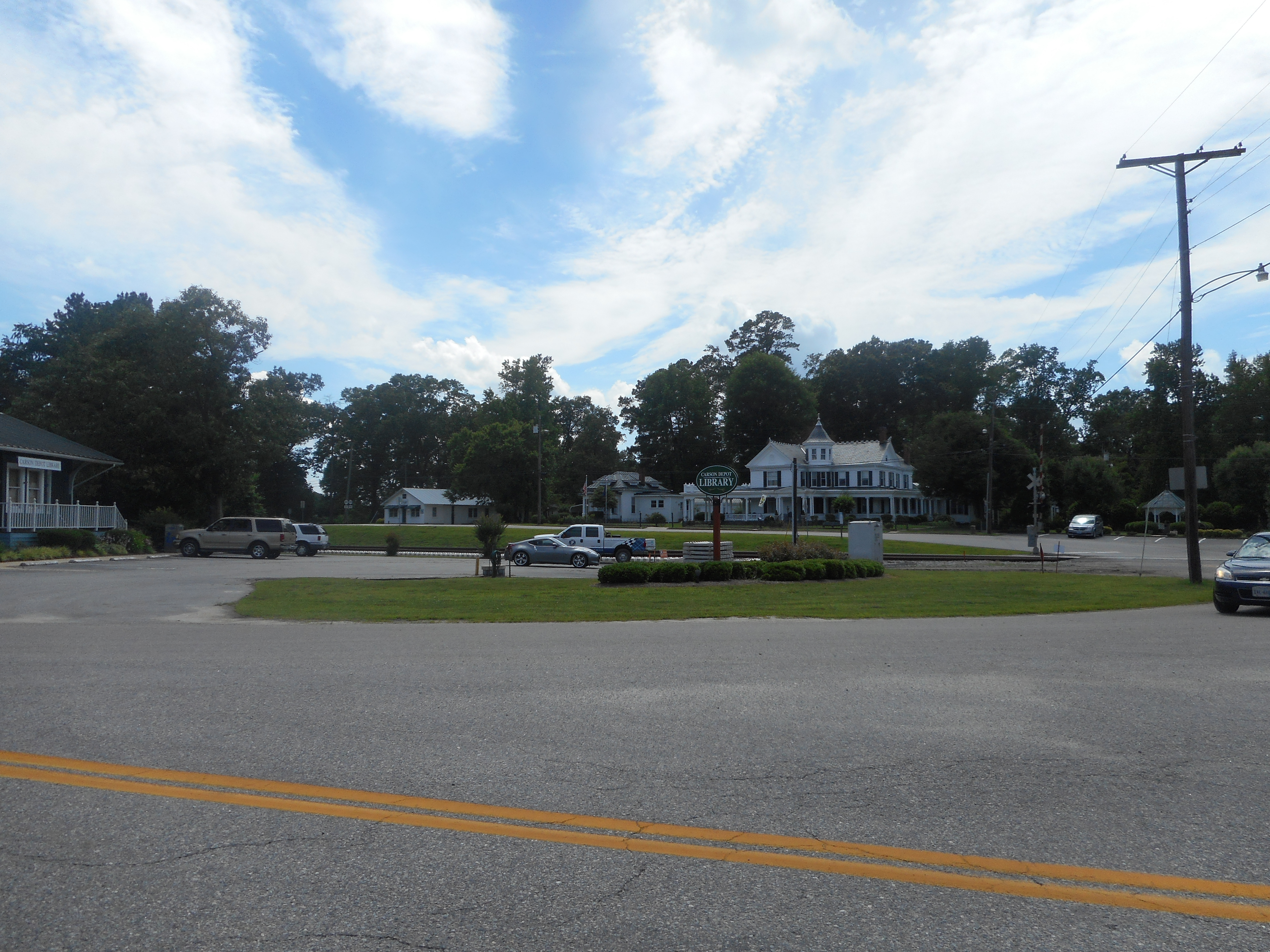
The unincorporated community of Carson, Virginia (pictured above), was considered as a place in the early 1970s to build a superspeedway to move NASCAR races from the Fairgrounds Raceway to.

In October 1973, the proposed track's zoning request to turn a 500-acre (200 ha) tract of land near U.S. Route 301 was approved by the Prince George County Board of Supervisors. By February 1974, the now named-Colonial–America Raceway was awaiting approval for a complete site plan, with Campbell stating that he hoped to start groundbreaking the following month. However, by June, no work had begun on the project due to persistent red tape delays, with Sawyer stating that the project organizers were waiting for final approval of the full project. After a further month of delays was announced the following month, a completion date was officially held off and unknown. In September, after a track repave, Fairgrounds Raceway experienced further track surface issues during the 1974 Capital City 500, with the surface having been reported to broke apart throughout the entire race. In response, the track was repaved in all four turns in time for the 1975 Richmond 500.

While the Colonial–America Raceway plans were delayed, in 1975, the Fairgrounds Raceway expanded its seating capacity. In July of that year, Sawyer announced the construction of grandstands to replace the bleachers in the track's first turn, with the seating capacity planned to increase to 15,000. By its completion in August, the seating capacity had increased to 18,000 according to the Times-Dispatch. In addition, a 1/5 mi (0.32 km) dirt oval was constructed to host motorcycle racing within the year in the track's infield, with plywood boards being used as the outside retaining walls. In February 1976, Sawyer stated that despite the seating capacity upgrades made to the Fairgrounds Raceway, he still intended to build the Colonial–America Raceway, adding that he was waiting for an approval for "highway proposals". The following month, the highway proposals were approved by the Prince George County Board of Supervisors. The approval revived the Colonial–America Raceway project, with Campbell stating hopes of opening the track in the fall of 1977. However, in June 1977, the Times-Dispatch reported that the organizers of the proposed track abandoned the project due to rising costs and uncertain economic conditions compared to the initial 1973 proposal, with an energy crisis and a recession having taken place since the initial announcement. Campbell later stated a month later in The Free Lance–Star that the organizers still aimed to build a replacement for the Fairgrounds Raceway, but had only abandoned the Colonial–America Raceway project which would have been built in Carson, an unincorporated community.

==== Dinwiddie County proposal ====
By 1978, Campbell and Sawyer described Fairgrounds Raceway as a "podunk operation" and a "second-rate facility" in desperate need of a complete remodeling. Despite this, the duo stated that they could not make necessary renovations due to the racetrack being owned by a non-profit company, thus needing approval from the company to make any renovations. The following year, Sawyer filed plans to build a racetrack in Dinwiddie County to the Dinwiddie County Board of Supervisors in June. Official plans released the following month stated plans were to build a 1.250 mi (2.012 km) track with a permanent seating capacity of 40,000 near the Dinwiddie County Airport in Petersburg off U.S. Route 1. The board of supervisors approved construction and the rezoning of 500 acres (200 ha) of land in August, with the track being projected to open in late 1981 or early 1982. In April 1980, the Dinwiddie County Industrial Developed Authority requested to issue "up to $8.5 million" in industrial development revenue bonds to raise funding for the track; the bonds issue was approved by U.S. Circuit Judge Herbert T. Williams III the following month.

While the Dinwiddie County plan awaited for bonds to be sold and general financing, the Fairgrounds Raceway underwent periodic small renovations while Sawyer began petitioning to massively revamp Fairgrounds Speedway to its owner, Atlantic Rural Exposition, Inc.; a process that could potentially last several years. In June, plans were announced the widening and lengthening the track's pit road "to almost double its present size" alongside the addition of 5,000 seats and improved restroom facilities. The renovations were completed in time for the 1980 Richmond 400. In May 1981, with new sponsorship funding from clothing brand Wrangler, Sawyer stated potential plans to heavily renovate and expand the Fairgrounds Raceway. Plans included the enlarging of the circuit to either 0.750 mi (1.207 km) or 1.000 mi (1.609 km), the construction of "as many as 10,000 seats", and other fan amenity improvements. Five months later, 50% of Richmond Fairgrounds Raceway, Inc., the leaseholder of the Fairgrounds Raceway that Sawyer was the president of, was sold to California businessman Warner W. Hodgdon for approximately $250,000 to help finance renovations at Fairgrounds Raceway. Hodgdon later became a partner for the proposed Dinwiddie County track the following year.

In 1983, Fairgrounds Raceway received improvements to its infield garage area alongside the construction of a new scoreboard, with Sawyer stating that he was awaiting approval from Hodgdon to enlarge the track. In June of that year, having previously bought a parcel of land in Dinwiddie County the year prior, Hodgdon was fined $50,000 for "failing to meet payments on his land options in Dinwiddie County". The fine was a part of Hodgdon's financial downfall in the mid-1980s, who had bought ownership interests in numerous other racetracks before facing numerous legal and financial issues. Hodgdon's financial issues alongside high interest rates led to the "slow, quiet death" of the Dinwiddie County plan. Afterwards, Fairgrounds Raceway underwent a $250,000 renovation in time for the 1983 Wrangler Sanfor-Set 400, including the construction of two infield garage buildings, a 2,500-seat grandstand, and an electrical scoreboard.

==== Isle of Wight County proposal ====
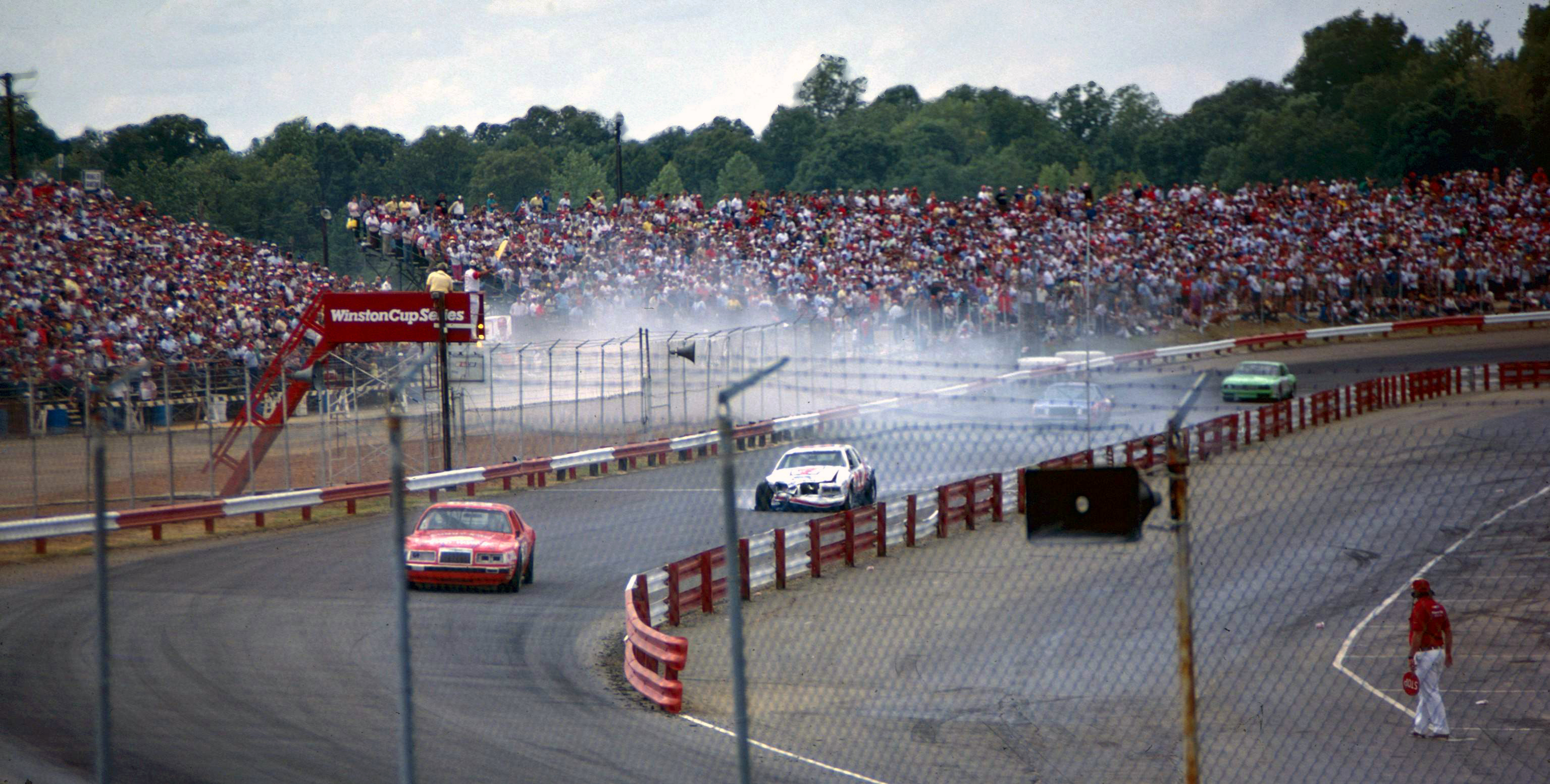
The Fairgrounds Raceway in 1986. During this year, the track was being considered to be replaced for a superspeedway in Isle of Wight County.

Another replacement plan for the Fairgrounds Raceway was announced in July 1985, with Sawyer partnering with non-profit group Future of Hampton Roads, Inc. to announce plans for a 1.75 mi (2.82 km) track with 50,000 seats in the Hampton Roads area. Specific locations were mentioned two months later by the Times-Dispatch, with potential areas including Bower's Hill, York County, Isle of Wight County, and James City County. Regarding the Fairgrounds, Sawyer stated in an October 1985 interview that he was "limited as to what I can do" with two years left on his lease contract. However, some on the Henrico County Board of Supervisors expressed interest at maintaining the track's two NASCAR Cup Series dates at the Fairgrounds, hoping to renovate it. By February 1986, Sawyer stated that there was "no way I can see" of keeping the Fairgrounds' two Cup Series date at the facility, criticizing the ARE for not accepting any of his proposals. The following month, the location of the proposed track was announced, with organizers selecting a location off U.S. Route 258 near Windsor in Isle of Wight County.

In June, Sawyer announced the installation of 4,000 to the Fairgrounds despite ongoing plans to secure financing for the Isle of Wight County track. The following month, the Sports Authority of Hampton Roads approved to seek $20 million in industrial development bonds to finance the proposed track. The 4,000-seat grandstand, later increased to 5,000, was installed in August in time for the 1987 Wrangler Jeans Indigo 400, with the intention of the grandstand being removed when the Isle of Wight track was built. After delays, in September, city councils in Norfolk, Portsmouth, and Chesapeake approved bond issues for the Isle of Wight track, helping progress the track. However, some of the cities requested a condition that to build the track, they wanted a guarantee from NASCAR to race at the track for 15 years or until the bonds were paid off. The guarantee was rejected by NASCAR president Bill France Jr. in November due to a general refusal of giving long-term sanctions, leading to the demise of the Isle of Wight proposal after the cities refused to drop their 15-year lease condition.

=== 1988 reconfiguration and remodeling ===
In February 1987, after three failed replacement plans, Sawyer announced plans to renew his lease on the Fairgrounds Raceway, stating hopes to completely remodel the Fairgrounds Raceway pending the approval of the ARE. The following month, he stated that while he had not completely given up on the Isle of Wight track, he most likely was going to abandon the plan until "concrete" financing came through. Despite the Future of Hampton Roads group making last-minute proposals and a financing plan including motorsports businessmen Roger Penske and Smithfield Foods CEO Joseph W. Luter III, on June 11 of that year, Sawyer, in collaboration with the ARE, officially announced plans to enlarge and remodel the Fairgrounds Raceway. Plans included the remodeling of the true oval into a D-shaped oval, lengthening the track to 0.75 mi (1.21 km), a seating capacity of 50,000, and improved fan amenities. Work began on a new grandstand to be used at the remodeled track the following month, increasing seating capacity to near 30,000 when it was completed in August. In November, Sawyer received the final approval from the Henrico County Board of Supervisors to remodel the track.

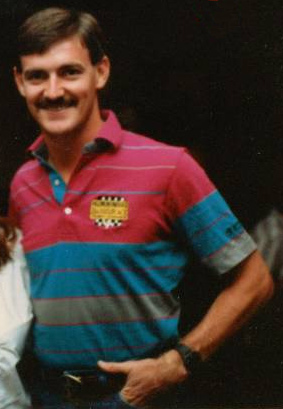
Davey Allison (above) won the first race at the remodeled Richmond International Raceway in 1988.

The final race at the Fairgrounds Raceway took place on February 21, 1988, with Neil Bonnett winning the event. Work began on the remodeling of the facility soon after, with the track being renamed to the "Richmond International Raceway" (RIR). By May, with additional upgrades to the track's sewer and waters facilities alongside the construction of an infield care center, the renovation cost increased from $2.5 million to $4 million. The following month, most of the concrete retaining walls were completed, with paving being planned to be completed the following month. However, delays concerning tunnels and the rest of the remaining walls caused paving to be delayed by a couple weeks. The first tire tests on the remodeled track took place on August 16, with testers Terry Labonte and Tommy Ellis giving positive comments for the track. The track was completed in time for the 1988 Miller High Life 400 on September 11 at a cost of approximately $5 million, with Davey Allison winning the first event at the remodeled track. RIR as a whole received mostly positive reception from drivers, but it did receive some criticism for the entrance of the track's pit wall being too close to the ideal racing line. In addition, some criticism was levied towards the track's disabled seating for inadequate views and amenities.

=== Mass expansion ===
In the following years, RIR underwent extensive renovations. In 1989, renovations included the construction of a $100,000 four-side scoreboard, increased parking areas, and an infield care center. Two years later, Sawyer released plans of short-term expansion of RIR. Plans included increasing seating capacity to 90,000, increased parking to accommodate the increase in capacity, and the construction of a permanent lighting system to host night races. In April, NASCAR allowed the track to host night races with a temporary lighting system to test the feasibility of a permanent system, with the first night races being run on August 3 of that year." More seats were added in 1992, with a 13,916-seat grandstand being built to replace an old grandstand in the first and second turns in time for the 1992 Miller Genuine Draft 400. By this point, renovation costs had increased to $15 million according to Sawyer, with Sawyer drafting further plans to expand to 90,000 seats by 1995.

In 1993, numerous renovations were made, including the reconfiguration of the pit road entrance in response driver complaints, a phase of the proposed permanent lighting system, and the expansion of the Dogwood and Henrico grandstands in the first two turns and the backstretch, respectively, to bring capacity to approximately 70,000. The following year, the Commonwealth and Azelea grandstands on the frontstretch were demolished and replaced by larger grandstands alongside the construction of additional luxury suites, increasing seating capacity further. Permanent lights were installed in 1995 alongside the construction of more seats in the Henrico grandstand to expand capacity to "about 83,000". That same year, the Henrico County Board of Supervisors approved a plan to let the track expand to 125,000 seats. In 1997, approximately 12,000 seats were added on the track's backstretch to bring capacity to almost 96,000.

==== ISC purchase ====
To accommodate plans for further expansion, in 1998, RIR began negotiations with the ARE to purchase the state fairgrounds for the track to turn into parking spaces, forcing the State Fair of Virginia to move. According to the Times-Dispatch, the increase in capacity would need 8,000 to 10,000 additional parking spaces, requiring the removal of some state fair buildings. In December of that year, the Sawyer family offered the ARE $40,000,000 for the land and threatened to build a new racetrack if they could not buy the land. By February 1999, track and state fair officials stated that both parties were closer to finalizing the purchase. Four months later, The Charlotte Observer reported that the France family-owned International Speedway Corporation (ISC) was "close" to buying RIR; this was denied by ISC soon after the Observer report. A vote for the ARE shareholders to approve the purchase of the state fairgrounds was later scheduled on July 27; after the ARE board of directors approved and recommended the sale, shareholders approved the sale by a vote of 5,381 to 21. With the approval, Sawyer announced long-term plans to expand capacity to 150,000. The sale was finalized in August of that year.

Shortly after Sawyer's purchase, on December 1, Sawyer announced the sale of RIR to ISC for $215,000,000. According to Sawyer, he felt the need to sell the facility to ISC to help push expansion plans, stating that "we saw the handwriting on the wall... and we could not do it as a private family unless we hocked everything. I bit the bullet." With the purchase, the control of day-to-day operations, longheld by the Sawyer family, was transferred to ISC marketing employee Doug Fritz, who was appointed as general manager. In 2000, seating capacity was increased to 102,420. Although the track gained approval to expand to 150,000 seats in June 2001, track executives were cautious to expand fully to 150,000 due to economy concerns. Also in 2001, RIR held its first Indy Racing League (now known as the IndyCar Series) race on June 30, with Buddy Lazier winning the event. Following high attendance at the 2002 Chevrolet Monte Carlo 400, the track added 3,000 seats in time for the 2003 Pontiac Excitement 400. In addition, renovations were also made to the pit stalls, drainage system, and other fan amenities.

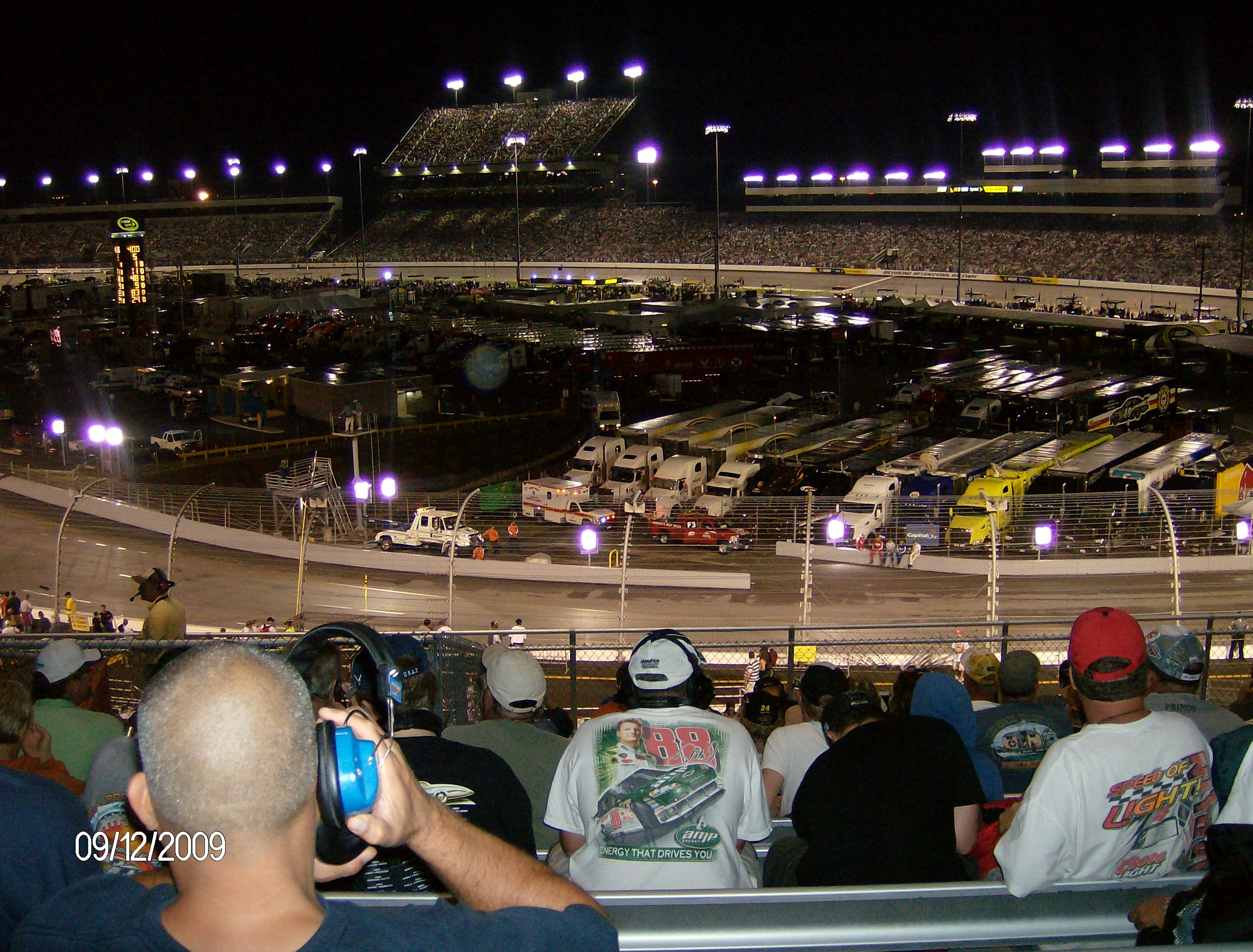
A photo of Richmond Raceway taken in 2009.

In 2003, RIR officials began considering the installation of SAFER barriers around the track's retaining walls in the wake of a safety push caused by the death of Dale Earnhardt; the installation was approved in July and completed the following month. In 2004, RIR underwent its first full repave since its 1988 remodeling alongside an increase of seating capacity to 107,094. Three years later, 2,911 seats on the frontstretch Commonwealth grandstand were demolished to build a 7,843-seat tower that raised capacity to 112,029, which was completed in time for the 2007 Crown Royal 400. In 2010, a 153 ft (47 m) video scoring tower was installed to replace an older and smaller scoring tower. The following year, after a crash involving Jeff Gordon at the 2011 Crown Royal 400, 900 ft (270 m) of additional SAFER barriers were installed on the track's inside retaining wall on the backstretch in time for that year's Cup Series race in September.

=== Capacity downsizing, NASCAR ownership ===
In July 2011, Fritz resigned as RIR's president and replaced by Dennis Bickmeier, who had previously served as the vice president of consumer sales and marketing at ISC-owned track Michigan International Speedway. During the year, RIR decreased its grandstand seating capacity to 94,063 in response to declining attendance at the track dating back to the 2008 Chevy Rock & Roll 400, the race that ended a 33-race sell-out streak. Two years later, parts of the backstretch Henrico grandstand, including the entirety of the Henrico Tower, alongside all the turn three grandstands were taken down to reduce capacity to approximately 75,000. Two years later, after a seat widening project, capacity was further reduced to 69,000. In 2016, the backstretch grandstands were completely demolished, reducing capacity to 60,000.

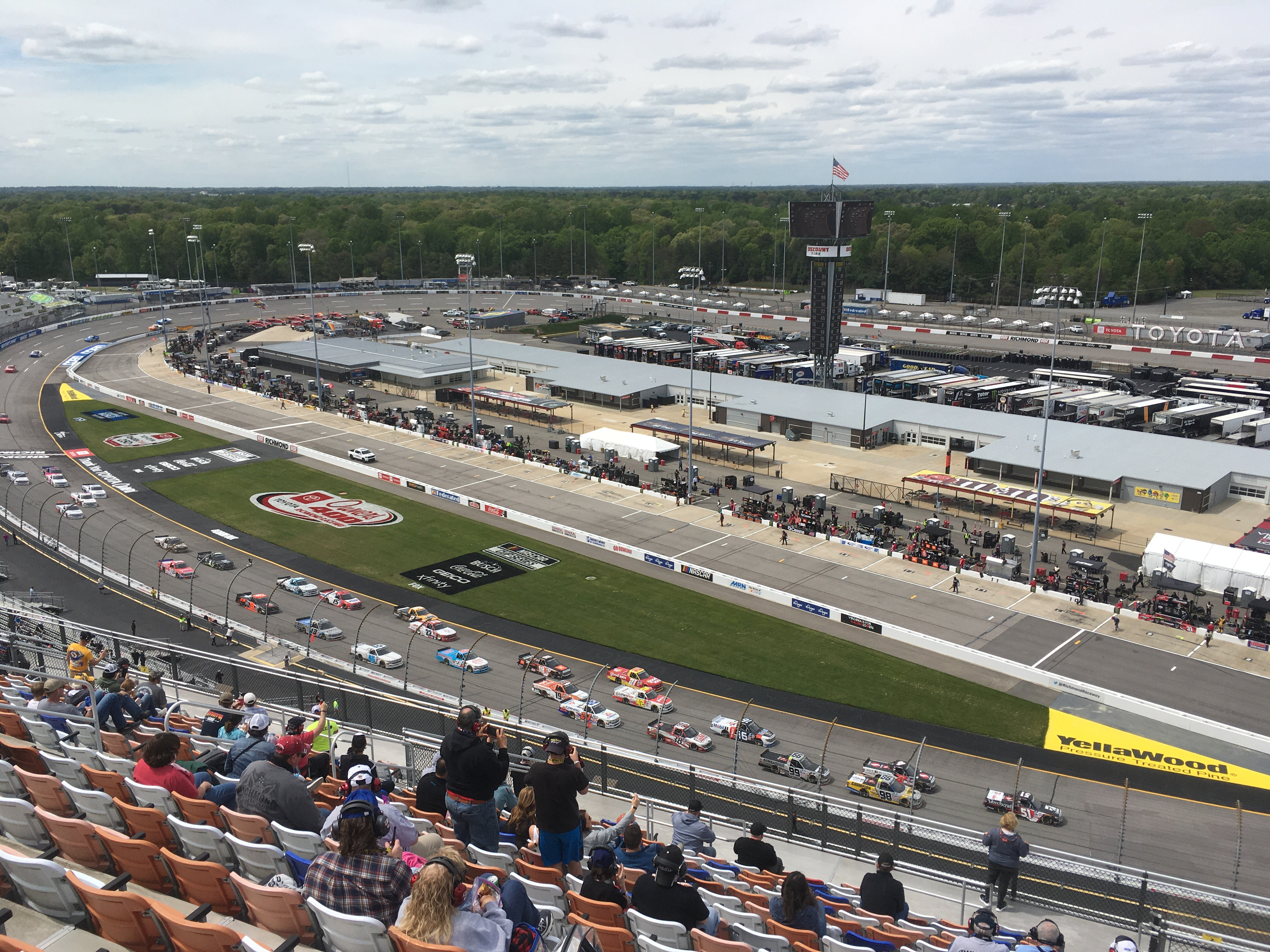
An overhead photo of Richmond Raceway in 2021.

A $30 million renovation and rebranding project was announced for the facility on July 11, 2017. Changes included a complete renovation of the track's garage area infield amenities, a "party deck" on the track's fourth turn, a specialized RV parking area, and the renaming of the track to "Richmond Raceway". (Note: Attributed to multiple references:) Work began on the project in September 2017 and was completed the following year in September. As part of the renovations, seats in the third and fourth turn grandstands were demolished, reducing capacity to 51,000. In 2019, ownership of the track was acquired by the sanctioning body of NASCAR after the company bought out ISC. After an 11-year stint, Bickmeier departed as president to become the executive director of the Henrico County Sports Authority, with Virginia Business Magazine chief revenue officer Lori Collier Waran replacing Bickmeier. In 2023, the track underwent another rebranding, changing the logo of the track to feature the Richmond skyline and the James River. In a 2024 Times-Dispatch report, capacity was listed as "under 50,000" after some seats were removed for tray tables.

== Events ==
=== Auto racing ===
==== NASCAR ====
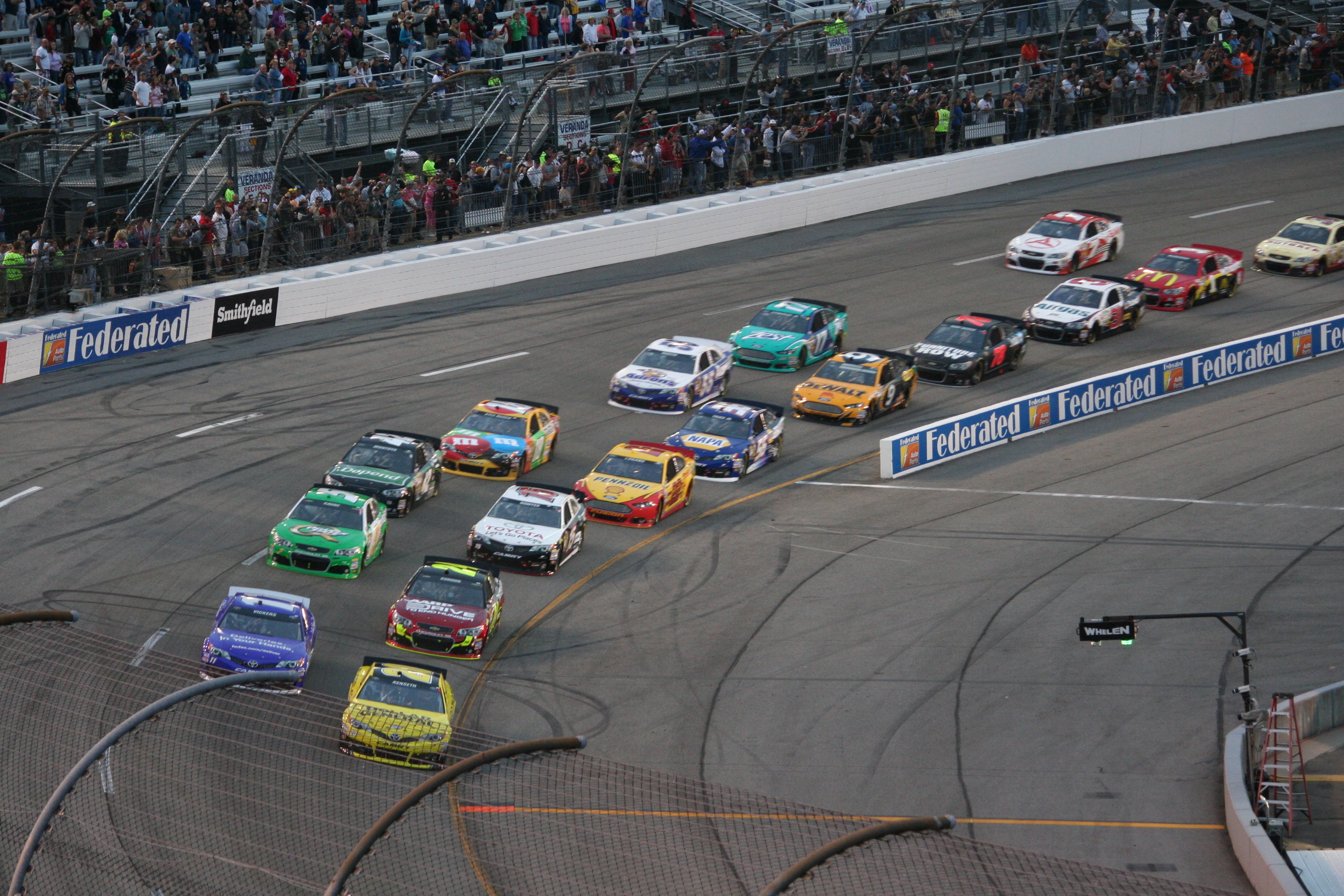
A NASCAR Cup Series race at Richmond Raceway in 2013. Since 1953, the track has held annual Cup Series races in most years.

Richmond Raceway hosts one NASCAR weekend annually highlighted by a NASCAR Cup Series race currently known as the Cook Out 400. Throughout most of the track's history, the track held two annual Cup Series races, hosting a second event in the spring (last known as the Toyota Owners 400) from 1959 to 2024. In addition, the track also hosts the NASCAR Truck Series' race as a support event for the Cup Series. The track also formerly held the NASCAR Xfinity Series' ToyotaCare 250 as a support event until 2024, as well as the Go Bowling 250 until 2021.

==== Open-wheel racing ====
In 2001, the Indy Racing League (now known as the IndyCar Series) ran their first race at the track, having announced their inaugural race a year earlier. The series held events at the venue annually until 2009, when it was dropped from the schedule the following year due to the 2009 race receiving negative reception and disagreements over sanctioning fees. Ten years later, the IndyCar Series announced that the series would return to the track in 2020 for a race on June 27; however, the race was cancelled due to COVID-19 restrictions and was never rescheduled.

==== Other racing events ====
Richmond Raceway has hosted various other racing series throughout its history, including the USAC Silver Crown Series, the USAC National Midget Championship, and the International Race of Champions (IROC).

=== Filming production ===
Richmond Raceway was used as a filming location for 1960 film Thunder in Carolina for some of the early parts of the movie. The track was also used for filming in 1977 documentary Stockcars!, a documentary about stock car racing.

== Lap records ==
As of September 2020, the fastest official race lap records at Richmond Raceway are listed as:

Category	Time	Driver	Vehicle	Event
D-shaped Oval (1988–present): 0.750 mi (1.207 km)
IndyCar	0:15.9368	Sam Hornish Jr.	Dallara IR-03	2004 SunTrust Indy Challenge
NASCAR Cup	0:21.849	Kevin Harvick	Ford Mustang GT	2019 Toyota Owners 400
NASCAR Xfinity	0:22.712	Christopher Bell	Toyota Camry	2018 ToyotaCare 250
NASCAR Truck	0:22.774	Austin Hill	Toyota Tundra	2020 ToyotaCare 250
