= Joseph P. Folger =

Joseph P. Folger (1951 – September 3, 2026) was an American scholar, professor, mediator, and author whose work focused on conflict resolution, mediation, communication, and organizational development. He was a professor of Adult and Organizational Development at Temple University in Philadelphia and co-founder of the Institute for the Study of Conflict Transformation.

== Education ==
Folger earned a Bachelor of Science degree in Speech Communication from Northwestern University. He subsequently received a Master of Arts and a PhD in Communication Sciences from the University of Wisconsin–Madison.

== Bibliography ==
- Working through Conflict: Strategies for Relationships, Groups and Organizations, 3rd Edition (with S. Poole and R.K. Stutman)
- The Promise of Mediation: Responding to Conflict through Empowerment and Recognition
- New directions in mediation (with T. S. Jones).
