= J. A. Folger =

American businessman (1835–1889)

- Born: James Athearn Folger; June 17, 1835; Nantucket, Massachusetts, U.S.
- Died: June 26, 1889 (aged 54)
- Other name: Jim Folger
- Occupation: Founder of Folgers Coffee
- Spouse: Eleanor Laughran
- Children: 4

James Athearn "J. A." Folger Sr. (June 17, 1835 – June 26, 1889) was an American businessman and the founder of the Folgers Coffee Company.

== Early years ==
Folger was born in Nantucket, Massachusetts, the son of Samuel Brown Folger (b. 1795) and wife Nancy Hiller (b. 1798). His father was a master blacksmith who had invested in a tryworks and bought two ships. They had nine children of which James was the second youngest. The Folger family roots can be traced back to Peter Folger, an English colonist. On July 13, 1846, a 33-acre (130,000 m^{2}) fire broke out in Nantucket's business section and burned the works and ship and 11 year old James helped in the reconstruction.

== San Francisco ==
After the discovery of gold in California, James (age 14), along with his brothers Henry (age 16) and Edward (age 20) set out in the autumn of 1849 on a ship bound for the Isthmus of Panama. After a raft and hiking journey across the Isthmus, the brothers waited at Panama City for quite a while before catching the Pacific mail steamer Isthmus on April 10, 1850. They entered the Golden Gate on May 5, 1850. Edward Folger was in California as early as 1846, read a newspaper.

The high wages being offered in San Francisco persuaded James to stay there to instead of heading to the gold fields. He helped in reconstructing the city after one of San Francisco's many fires, similar to how he had in Nantucket. He helped build a spice-and-coffee mill for a man named William H. Bovee.

In 1860, he founded the San Francisco coffee firm known as the J. A. Folger Coffee Company, known today simply as Folgers Coffee.

== Personal life ==
J. A. Folger married Eleanor Laughran (born October 17, 1837) and was the father of James Athearn Folger Jr. (1864–1921), who married Clare Luning. James and Eleanor had three other children; John Athearn m. Nancy Try (née Slaughter), Ernest Randolph, and Elizabeth. He is the paternal grandfather of Peter Folger, and the great-grandfather of Abigail Folger. Abigail was murdered in 1969, by members of the Manson family, along with her friend, actress Sharon Tate among others. He is also the uncle of Henry Clay Folger, founder of the Folger Shakespeare Library.

== Death ==
He died June 26, 1889, at the age of 54 and is buried in the Folger family plot at Mountain View Cemetery in Oakland, California.
