= Peter Folger =

American coffee magnate (1905–1980)

Peter Folger (December 26, 1905 – August 27, 1980) was an American coffee heir, socialite, and member of the prominent United States Folger family. He was also the longtime chairman of the board and president of the Folgers Coffee Company. He was the son of James Athearn Folger, Jr. (born c. 1864) and wife Clare Luning and paternal grandson of founder J. A. Folger, and the father of Abigail Folger, who was killed in the notorious Tate–LaBianca murders in 1969 at the age of 25.

== Early life ==
Born and raised in California to James Athern Folger Jr. and Clara Eugenia Luning, Folger studied business and graduated from Yale University where he was an athlete on their football, track and field, and polo teams. Peter Folger later served in World War II as a Marine Major.

== Business ==
In 1963, after having helped to build the family firm into the third largest coffee wholesaler in the United States, Folger sold the company to Procter & Gamble for 1,650,000 shares of P&G common stock. However, he and the Folger family continued to operate Folgers as a P&G subsidiary.

== Personal life ==
He married twice, first to Inés Mejía (1907–2007), the daughter of Encarnacion Mejía, the consul general for El Salvador, and wife Gertrude Guirola, sister of Edwin Mejía (b. 1897), and member of a prestigious California land grant family hailing from San Salvador. They went on to have two children, Abigail Anne (b. 1943) and Peter Jr. (b. 1945). Inés filed for divorce which was granted in 1952. They shared joint custody of their two children.

On June 30, 1960, Peter married his secretary Beverly Mater (b. 1935). They had one daughter together, Elizabeth, in January 1961. Peter and Beverly lived with their daughter at the Folger mansion located in Woodside, California until 1974 when they moved to a newly built home on Roberta Drive. The murder of his elder daughter, Abigail Anne, in Los Angeles, California, on August 9, 1969, was said to have lessened Peter's desire to continue living at the Woodside estate, where she grew up.

== Death ==
Folger died from prostate cancer at his home in Woodside, California, at the age of 74 on August 27, 1980, and was buried in the Folger family plot at Mountain View Cemetery, in Oakland, California. He was survived by his wife, Beverly, who did not remarry.
