= Folger Coffee Company Building =

Historic office building in San Francisco, USA

- U.S. National Register of Historic Places
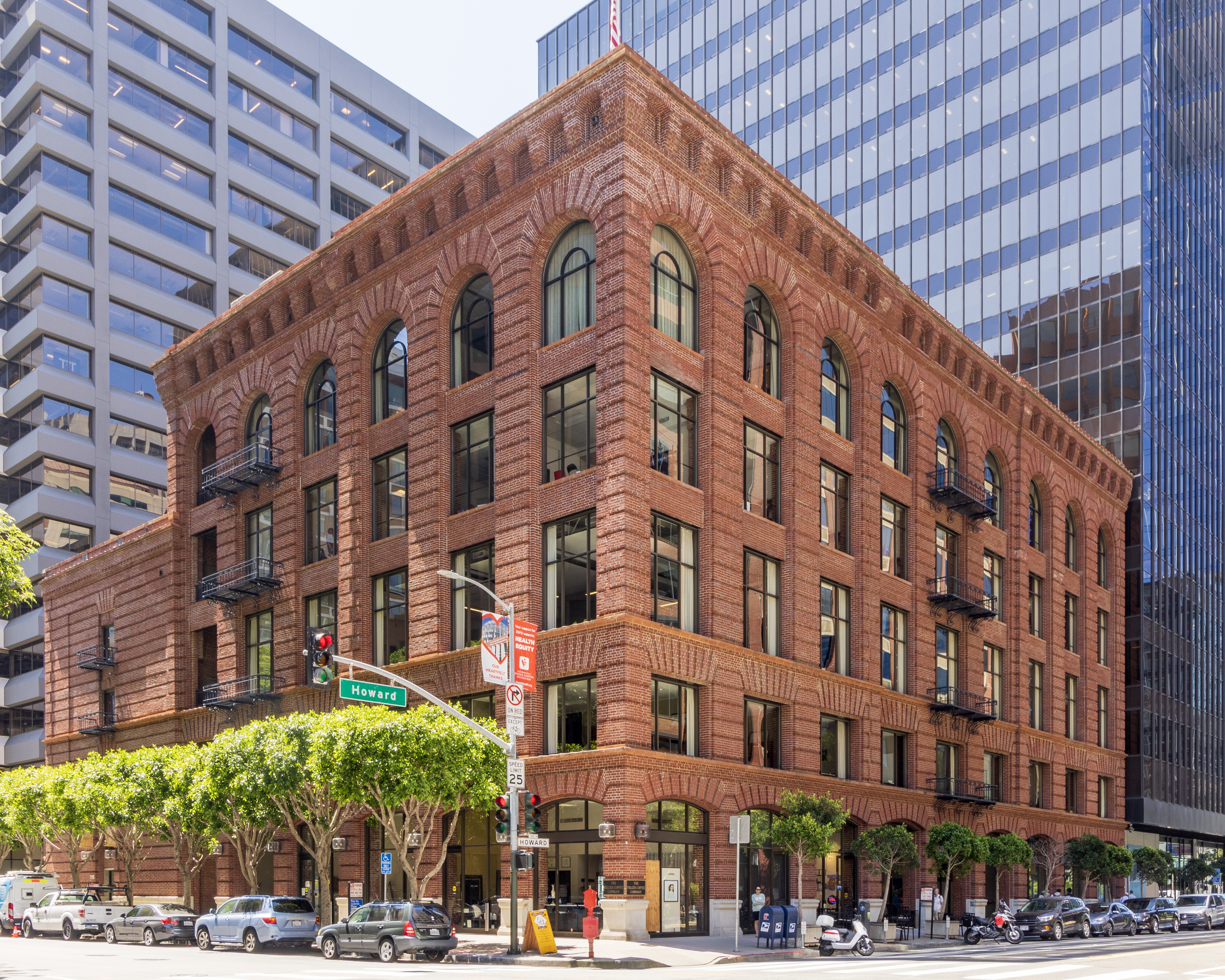
- The building in 2023

- Location within San Francisco County Location within California
- Location: 101 Howard St., San Francisco, California
- Coordinates: 37°47′27.35″N 122°23′33.11″W
- Area: less than one acre
- Built: 1904
- Architects: Schulze, Henry A.
- Architectural style: Renaissance Revival
- NRHP reference No.: 96000679
- Added to NRHP: June 21, 1996

The Folger Coffee Company Building is a historic mid-rise office building located at 101 Howard Street in the Financial District, San Francisco.

== Description and history ==
The five-story plus basement, Renaissance Revival style building was built in 1904 as the headquarters of J. A. Folger & Company, and remained the main offices of the company until 1963 when Folger's Coffee was purchased by Procter & Gamble. As described by its NRHP designation, it is, “unusual and noteworthy in that the building survived both of the major San Francisco earthquakes in 1906 and 1989.” One reason for this is that it was, “constructed on wooden pilings that were driven into San Francisco Bay fill to a depth of about forty feet, with a steam driven pile driver.”

On August 2, 2011, The Folger Building was purchased by the University of San Francisco, for almost $37 million. This marked the return of the university's downtown roots. It has no LEED certification, as is typical of buildings from its time, and has 83,500 square feet of rentable office space.

The building was listed on the National Register of Historic Places on June 21, 1996.
