= Coming Home (advertisement) =

2009 television commercial

- Still image from the advertisement
- Agency: Saatchi & Saatchi
- Client: The J.M. Smucker Company
- Language: English
- Media: Television
- Running time: 45 seconds
- Product: Folgers Coffee
- Release date: 2009
- Written by: Doug Pippin
- Directed by: Ray Dillman
- Music by: Leslie Pearl
- Starring: Matthew Alan; Catherine Combs
- Produced by: Jerry Boyle
- Preceded by: "Peter Comes Home For Christmas"

"Coming Home" (commonly referred to by unofficial titles such as the Folgers Incest Ad or the Folgers "Brother and Sister" Commercial) is a 2009 American television commercial for Folgers Coffee. The commercial was created by the advertising agency Saatchi & Saatchi with the intention of emulating Folgers' 1980s commercial "Peter Comes Home For Christmas". It has become infamous online due to many people seeing incestuous subtext between the brother and sister.

== Plot ==
Writing for GQ, Gabriella Paiella described the plot as follows:

"Coming Home" opens with a taxi dropping a young man off outside a snow-covered house bedecked in Christmas decorations early one morning. A young woman excitedly opens the door and establishes that she's his sister by pointing at herself and saying "sister!" He's weary, having just returned from volunteering in "West Africa," and the two share a cup of freshly-brewed Folgers coffee while their parents are still asleep. … He hands her a small present, but instead of opening it, she peels off the red bow and sticks it on his shirt. "What are you doing?" he asks. "You're my present this year," she responds. The camera zooms in on her shy glance, then cuts to his furtive, flirty smile.

Their parents then enter the kitchen and greet the brother as the jingle "the best part of waking up, is Folgers in your cup" plays.

== Background ==
The Folgers Coffee commercial, created by the advertising agency Saatchi & Saatchi, first aired in 2009. It was first pitched to Saatchi & Saatchi producer Jerry Boyle by Doug Pippin, who would serve as its writer. The commercial was directed by Ray Dillman and filmed in Santa Monica, California during the summer of 2009.

The commercial was a remake of the 1985 Folgers commercial called "Peter Comes Home For Christmas". In that commercial, a man named Peter (played by Greg Wrangler) comes home and is greeted by his younger sister, who is a little girl (as opposed to a teenager). An additional inspiration was that writer Doug Pippin's son had recently joined the Peace Corps and came home for Christmas.

== Reception ==
The commercial became infamous after many viewers perceived that the brother-sister main characters were either engaged in, or desired, an incestuous relationship. The commercial inspired multiple works of fan fiction (collectively referred to as "Folgercest" or "Folgerscest"), including an entire section on the website Archive of Our Own; fan art; and parody videos.

Comedy distributor Above Average Productions released an extended cut parody of the commercial. The parody, written by Glenn Boozan, shows the siblings in an incestuous relationship. For the advertisement's tenth anniversary in 2019, GQ interviewed people involved in creating it. The advertisement is periodically parodied in internet culture and memes, usually preceding or during the winter holiday season.
