= John Foulger =

British painter

- Born: 10 September 1942
- Died: 25 May 2007 (aged 64); Middleton-on-Sea, West Sussex, England
- Known for: Painting
- Movement: Post-Impressionism

John Foulger (10 September 1942 – 25 May 2007) was an established landscape and seascape painter, specialising in oils and acrylics. Before becoming a professional artist he was employed by a firm of art dealers in London.

Foulger was an exhibitor at the Royal Society of British Artists, Royal Society of Marine Artists, New English Art Club, National Society of Painters, Sculptors and Printmakers, and the United Society of Artists. Works were also shown at Syon House, The Mall Galleries, London, Brighton Museum and Art Gallery, Towner Art Gallery, Eastbourne, and the Dedham Centre. Retrospective Exhibition Littlehampton Museum, 1984, shown on television. He was a member of the Federation of British Artists, and elected Associate of the Moseley Arts Society, and member of several other art societies in Surrey and Sussex.

His paintings are now to be found in galleries and private collections in London, Vienna, The Hague, Montreal, California, New Orleans and elsewhere in Europe, America, Australia, New Zealand and Japan.

Foulger was presented to Her Majesty Queen Elizabeth the Queen Mother at the presentation of one of his paintings in 1975. Middleton exhibition opened by Lor Chalfron in 1991. One of his equestrian pictures was presented as a trophy for the inaugural running of the Persian War Hurdle, an important race run at Chepstow in 1979 to commemorate the great triple-champion hurdler Persian War. A picture of Persian War in retirement was later auctioned for the injured jockey's fund. Another painting of racing at Chepstow was the trophy for the St. Patrick's chase run in 1980.

== Death and afterward ==
Foulger left his house and contents to Oxfam following his death. Over 100 of his paintings we sold during the summer of 2008, raising over £13,000 for the charity.
