= Folgers =

American coffee brand

- Product type: Coffee
- Current owner: The J.M. Smucker Company
- Country: United States
- Introduced: 1850; 176 years ago
- Related brands: Café Bustelo; Dunkin' at Home
- Markets: North America
- Previous owners: Procter & Gamble (1963–2008)
- Tagline: "The Best Part of Wakin' Up is Folgers in Your Cup"
- Website: www.folgerscoffee.com

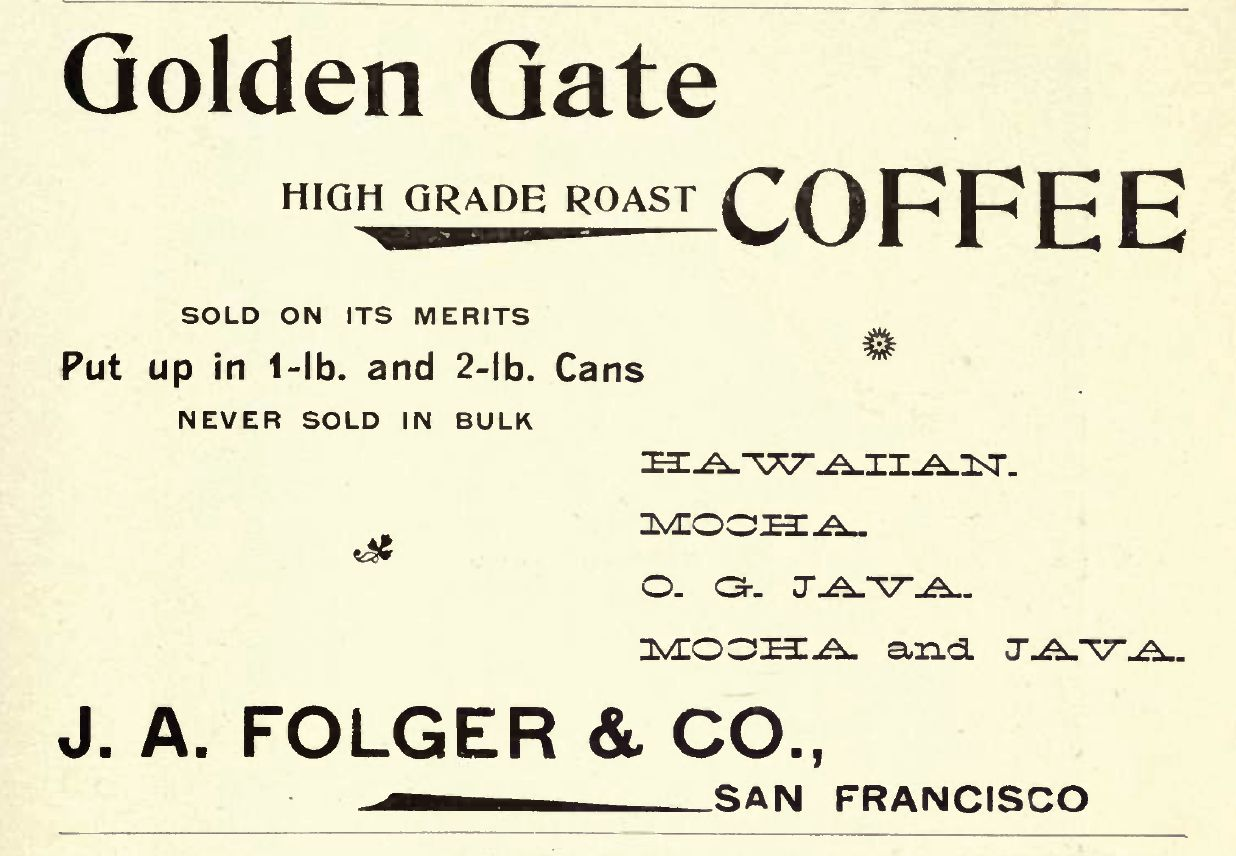
1898 Advertisement for J. A. Folger & Company coffee

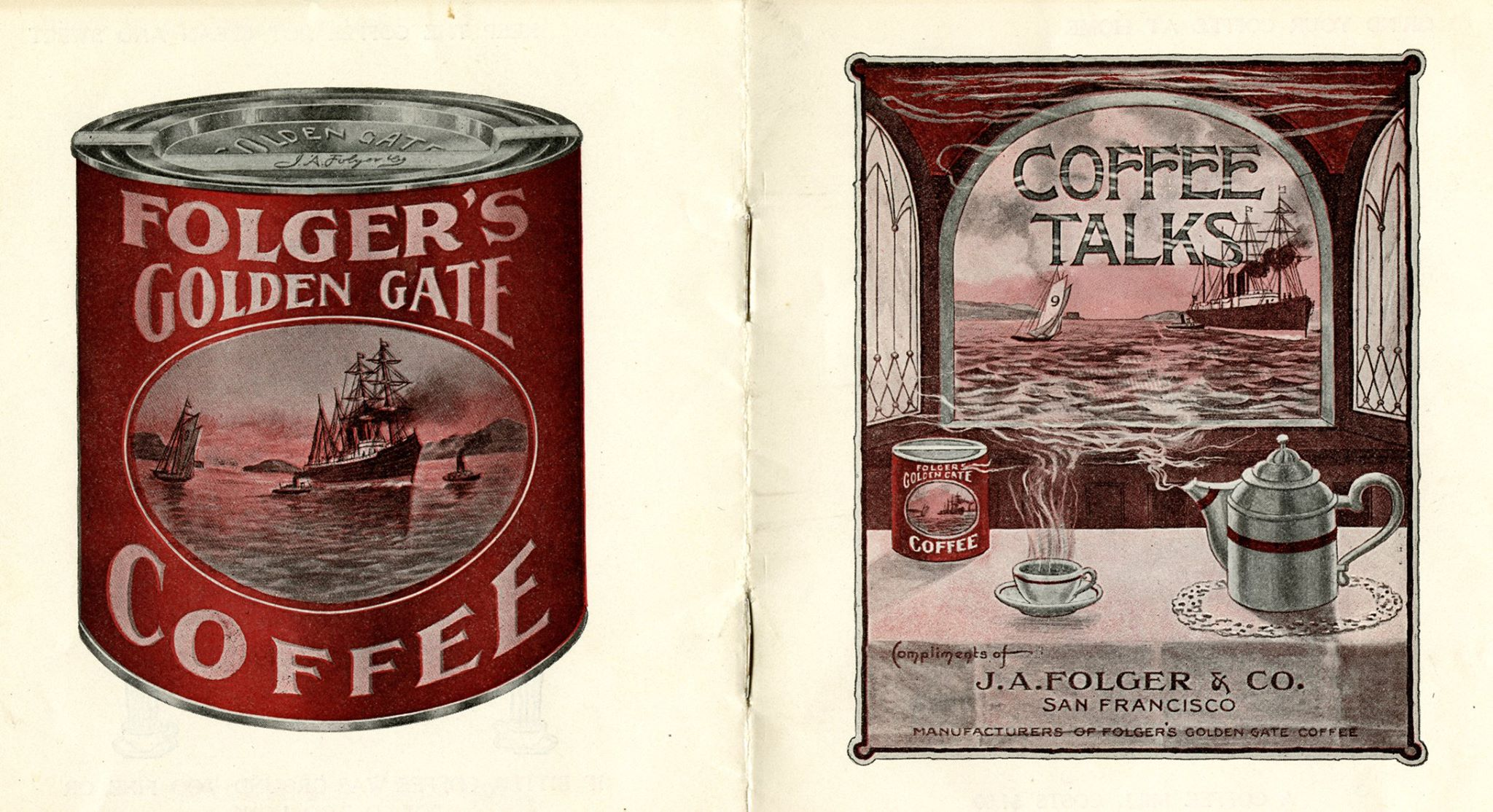
Folger's Golden Gate Coffee advertisement, early 20th century

Folgers is an American brand of coffee produced and sold in the United States, with additional distribution in Asia, Canada and Mexico. It forms part of the food and beverage division of the J.M. Smucker Company. Folgers roasts its coffee in New Orleans.

== History ==
"J.A. Folger & Co. were established in 1850 as Wm. H. Bovee & Co"

The precursor of the Folger Coffee Company was founded in 1850 in San Francisco, California, as the Pioneer Steam Coffee and Spice Mills. Prior to that Californians had to purchase green coffee beans and roast and grind them on their own. The mill’s founding owner, William H. Bovee, saw the opportunity to produce roasted and ground coffee ready for brewing. Bovee hired newly arrived 15-year-old carpenter J. A. Folger to help build his mill. Folger had come from Nantucket Island with his two older brothers during the California Gold Rush. In the 1850s, kerosene became a cheaper alternative to whale oil, Nantucket's dominant business. Many Nantucket ships were re-purposed to instead bring coffee from South America to San Francisco. After working at Bovee's mill for nearly a year, Folger had saved enough money to buy part of the company, and went to mine for gold. He agreed to carry samples of coffee and spices, taking orders from grocery stores along the way. Upon his return to San Francisco in 1865, Folger became a full partner at Pioneer Steam Coffee and Spice Mills. In 1872, he bought out the other partners and renamed the company J.A. Folger & Co.

In 1861, James Folger married. He and his wife had four children, and two of the children worked for the family business. In 1889, Folger died, and his oldest son, James A. Folger II, became president of J.A. Folger & Co at the age of 26.

In the 1900s, the company began to grow dramatically due primarily to a salesman named Frank P. Atha. Atha sold coffee in the California area, but proposed to James Folger II that he open and manage a Folgers Coffee plant in Texas. The company grew exponentially after Atha opened the Texas plant.

Under the mid-20th century leadership of Peter Folger, the brand became one of the principal coffee concerns in North America. In 1960, the construction of a Folger Coffee Company plant in New Orleans was started due to new shipping routes from Central America. Procter & Gamble acquired Folger's in 1963 and removed the apostrophe from its name. (Note: According to Lisa Salazar in her 2011 post on 3 Geeks and A Law Blog, "Intellectual Property lawyers say that trademarked names act as adjectives to a product and, therefore, cannot be made possessive. If a trademarked name is treated as a noun, the trademark could be rendered useless." ("Grammarously Speaking: Don't Apostrophize that Trademark," by Lisa Salazar, 3 Geeks and A Law Blog, July 27, 2011, retrieved November 18, 2019))

On August 9, 1969, company heiress Abigail Folger was stabbed to death in Los Angeles as part of the Manson Family's Tate–LaBianca murders.

P&G announced in January 2008 that Folgers would be spun off into a separate Cincinnati-based company but reversed itself that June and announced Folgers would be acquired by the end of 2008 by The J.M. Smucker Company. Utilizing a rare financial technique called a Reverse Morris Trust, Smucker purchased Folgers in November 2008 and made it a subsidiary.

== Brands ==
Folgers established brand colors, included on their logo, were traditionally a moderately dark red background with white lettering. The white or grey lettering is still used, with a green background signifying decaf and a black background signifying their Noir dark roast.

Folgers products available in the United States include:

- Ground coffee in cans
  - 100% Colombian (medium roast)
  - Black Silk (dark roast), also available in decaf
  - Brazilian blend (medium roast)
  - Breakfast blend (mild roast)
  - Classic roast (medium roast), also in decaf and half caff
  - Coffeehouse blend (medium-dark roast)
  - Country roast (medium-dark roast)
  - French roast (medium-dark roast)
  - Gourmet Supreme (medium-dark roast)
  - House blend (medium roast)
  - Special roast (medium roast)
- Folgers Noir, a line of dark roast coffees
- Simply Smooth, a mild roast coffee intended to be gentler on the stomach, also in decaf
- Simply Gourmet, a line of naturally flavored coffees
- Folgers Flavors, French vanilla and hazelnut flavored coffees, also available as decaf hazelnut
- Folgers Crystals, instant coffee available in regular and decaf
- Coffee Singles, single-serve packets
- Cappuccino instant mixes
- K-cup pods in a variety of roasts and flavors
- 1850, a premium brand launched in 2018

In Canada, Folgers is primarily available as Classic Roast and Mountain Roast.

In the United Kingdom, Folgers Instant Crystals are available.

== Advertising ==
Instant Folgers coffee ad from the 1960s

Folgers is promoted with the slogan "The best part of waking up is Folgers in your cup!" It is well associated with a jingle featured in almost every advertisement since 1984, with lyrics by Susan Spiegel Solovay and Bill Vernick, and music by Leslie Pearl. Over the years it has been rearranged and performed by many famous musicians, such as Richie Havens, Randy Travis, Bonnie Tyler, Paul Stanley, Aretha Franklin, and Rockapella.

From 1965 to 1986, Folgers was known for television ads involving "Mrs. Olson", a Swedish neighbor played by Virginia Christine who invariably recommended a cup of Folgers coffee for the characters in the commercial.

Folgers promoted their instant coffee in the 1970s and early 1980s ads which took the viewer inside various 'high-end' restaurants while a voice-over (by Bryan Clark) whispered to the viewer that they've secretly switched the coffee used at the restaurant with Folgers, and watched the restaurants' patrons to see if they could tell whether or not they noticed the difference.

One Folgers television ad from 1985, "Peter Comes Home For Christmas," became particularly associated with the Christmas holidays. A college student returns home, apparently on Christmas Day. His younger sister is the first one to greet Peter, helping him make the Folgers. The smell of freshly brewed coffee awakening his parents and alerting them to their son's arrival. The Cunningham & Walsh (Note: Cunningham & Walsh, Inc., was a New York-based advertising agency that, as a legal entity under that name, was established in 1950 – the namesakes being Frederick Harper Walsh (1884–1964) and John Phillip Cunningham (1897–1985). However, the firm was successor to the Newell-Burton Company, Inc., also a New York-based advertising agency founded in 1919 bearing the names of two founders, Clarence DeRocha Newell, Jr. (1876–1967), who retired in 1950, and Burton Emmett (1871–1935). Cunningham was a founding employee of Newell-Burton in the art department and Walsh was a founding member of Newell-Burton. (see AdAge Encyclopedia of Advertising, referenced below)) spot aired yearly until 1998, then in edited form in 2004 and 2005.

In the mid-1980s Folgers became a NASCAR sponsor. After a trial season with the Joe Ruttman-driven and Larry McClure-owned Chevrolet in 1985, Folgers expanded its sponsorships.

In 2006, the advertising agency Saatchi & Saatchi created a viral advertisement, popularly known as "Happy Mornings", in which a large group of cheerful singers and dancers appear at sunrise as the sun itself to wake people up.

In 2009, Saatchi & Saatchi created a holiday ad, "Coming Home", wherein a man reunites with his teenage sister at their parents' home after volunteering in West Africa. The ad quickly went viral, and has been criticized for perceived sexual tensions between the siblings.

In 2014, the brand celebrated the 30th anniversary of the famous jingle.

== Building ==
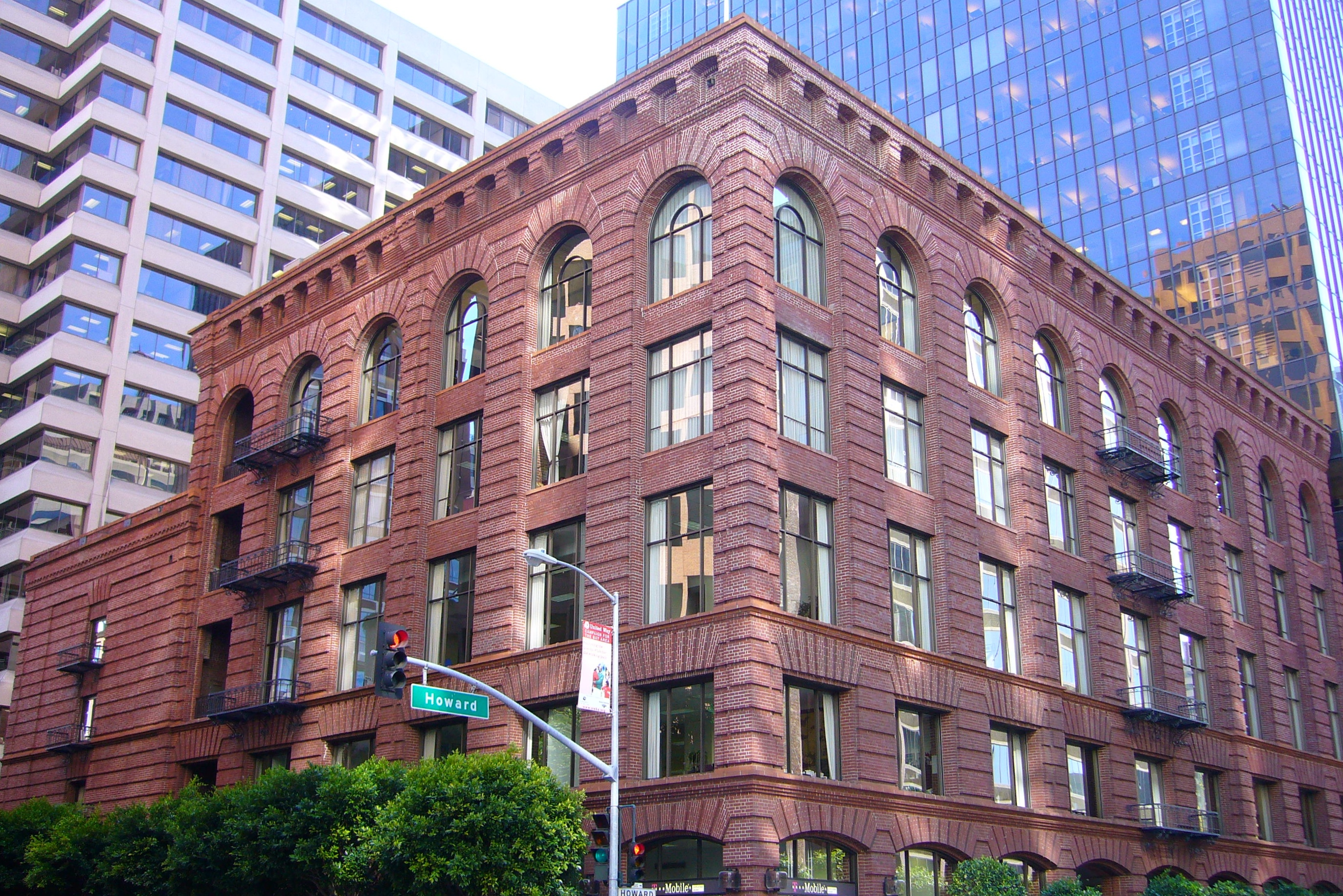
The Folger Coffee Company Building at 101 Howard Street, San Francisco

The brick, five-story Folger Coffee Company Building at 101 Howard in San Francisco, California is the former headquarters of Folgers. It is listed on the United States National Register of Historic Places. The building still has a sign saying "The Folgers Coffee Company" on one corner.

On August 2, 2011, the Folger Building was purchased by the University of San Francisco, marking a return to the university's roots in downtown San Francisco.

== In popular culture ==
In the 1998 film The Big Lebowski, after one of the protagonists dies, their ashes are transported to the Pacific Ocean in a Folgers coffee can because the cheapest urn is deemed too expensive. The film has become a cult classic, and at least one person has dressed up as a can of Folgers during a fan event.

In the 1991 Seinfeld episode "The Library", Jerry is challenged by Lt. Bookman (played by Philip Baker Hall) on why there is no instant coffee available for guests to his apartment: "You buy a jar of Folger's Crystals, you put it in the cupboard, you forget about it. Then later on when you need it, it's there. It lasts forever. It's freeze-dried. Freeze-dried crystals."

The November 16, 1991 episode of Saturday Night Live had a sketch that parodied the 'high end restaurant' commercials from the 1970s and 1980s, showing a customer (Chris Farley) violently losing his temper upon being informed that he was given another company's coffee blend instead of the restaurant's usual blend.
