= Martin Creek (Sausal Creek tributary) =

Martin Creek Dennis Martin Creek

Location
- Country: United States
- State: California
- Region: San Mateo County
- City: Woodside, California

Physical characteristics
- Source: Northeast slope of the Santa Cruz Mountains
  - location: Woodside
  - coordinates: 37°22′49″N 122°15′31″W
  - elevation: 1,400 ft (430 m)
- Mouth: Confluence with Corte Madera Creek
  - location: Border of Woodside, California and Stanford University
  - coordinates: 37°24′36″N 122°14′18″W
  - elevation: 358 ft (109 m)

Martin Creek, known locally as Dennis Martin Creek, is a 1.4-mile-long (2.3 km) north by northeastward-flowing stream originating just east of Skyline Boulevard in the Santa Cruz Mountains, near the community of Skylonda in San Mateo County, California. It flows through the town of Woodside before crossing Portola Road and joining Sausal Creek on Stanford University lands just across the border from Woodside. Sausal Creek enters Searsville Reservoir, which flows to San Francisco Bay via San Francisquito Creek.

== History ==
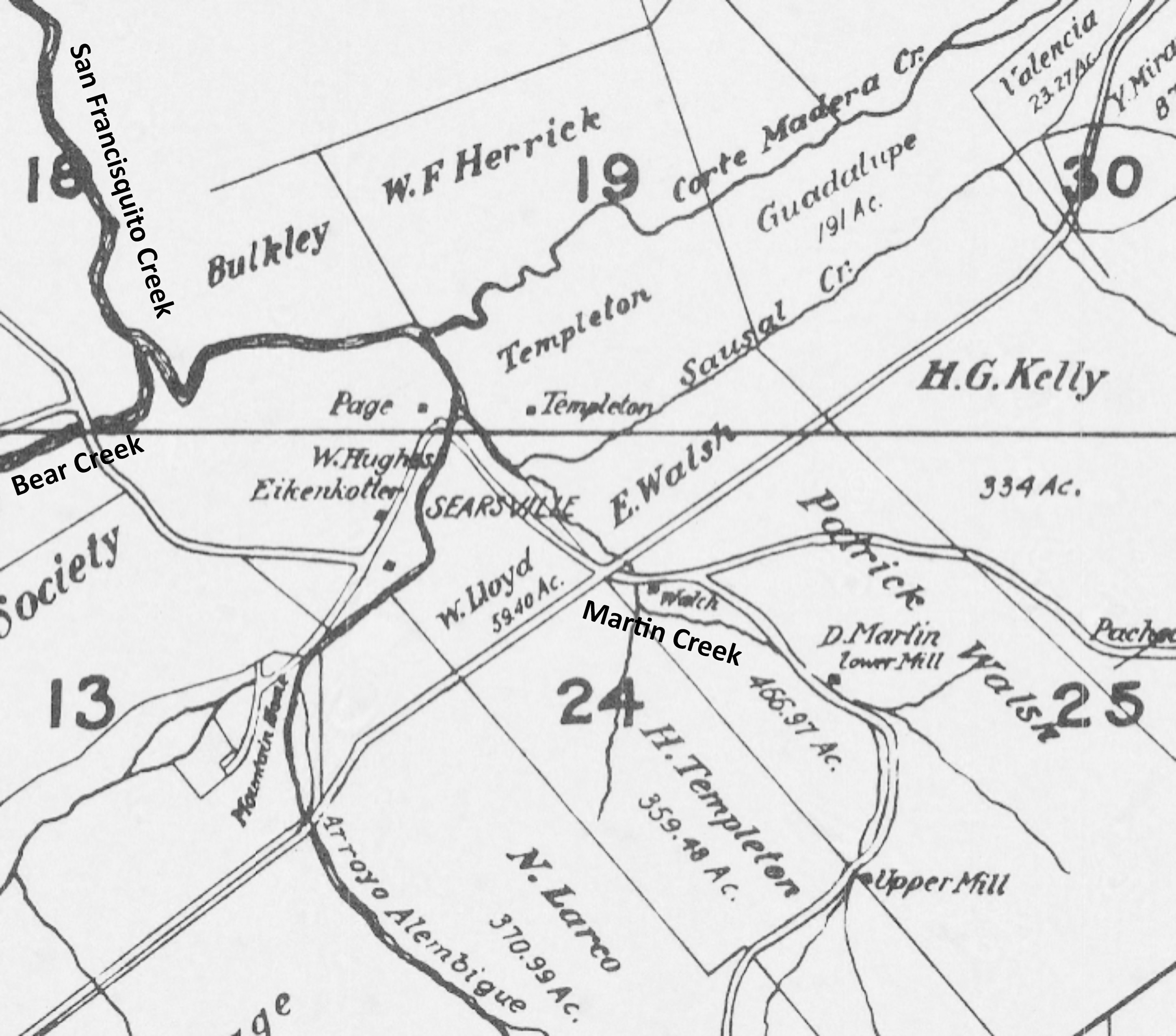
Snippet of Easton's 1868 Official San Mateo County Map showing the historical town of Searsville in between Alambique Creek (Arroyo Alembique) and Sausal Creek (and its Martin Creek tributary). Searsville was inundated by Searsville Dam and Reservoir in 1891. Modified to also show Bear Creek and San Francisquito Creek.

Dennis Martin, the Canadian-American son of William Martin, and his parents and siblings began a cross-country trek from Missouri to California in 1844. At a Jesuit priest's urgings, they had joined two other Irish families—the Murphys and the Sullivans—to leave Missouri in search of “Catholic institutions” in the West. The Stephens-Townsend-Murphy Party became the first pioneers to cross the Sierra Nevada into California. Their route was the same chosen by the ill-fated Donner Party two years later. On reaching Truckey's Lake (now Donner Lake) on November 14, 1844, the party left six of their eleven wagons because of difficulties getting them over what would become Donner Pass. Eighteen-year-old Moses Schallenberger spent the winter there alone, watching over the wagons, surviving the impassably deep snows by trapping foxes for food. The rest of the party spent the winter in the upper Yuba River valley, until most of the men were enticed to fight with Captain John Sutter for Mexican California Governor Manuel Micheltorena, in exchange for promises of land grants. Instead of joining them, Dennis Martin returned to the upper Yuba with supplies for the women and children. On learning of Moses Schallenberger's plight, 23-year-old Martin crossed the snowbound Sierras in mid-winter to rescue Schallenberger at Donner Lake in February, 1845. He showed Schallenberger how to construct proper snowshoes and the two successfully recrossed the Sierras to the Central Valley.

Martin worked for Captain John A. Sutter in the summer of 1845, who sent him to supervise three Indians cutting redwood on the San Francisco Peninsula. While so employed, Dennis Martin met a fellow Irishman, John Coppinger. Then Martin sought and found gold on the Mokelumne and Stanislaus Rivers in partnership with Daniel Murphy, his transcontinental companion, and Charles Maria Weber, the founder of Stockton. Quickly making his fortune in gold, Martin bought 1,500 acres of land north of San Francisquito Creek from his friend John Coppinger, the grantee of Rancho Cañada de Raymundo, for $1,500. This property is now marked by the Stanford Linear Accelerator Center. Then he purchased the wooded slopes of the creek he named for himself from the Rancho Corte de Madera including much of the modern day Jasper Ridge Biological Preserve, the Ladera subdivision and the Webb Ranch. Martin established an upper and lower sawmill on Dennis Martin Creek, the lower mill about a half-mile downstream from Schilling Lake. Martin encouraged his relatives and friends in Canada and Missouri to join him, and many of these made up the early population of the historic mill town of Searsville, inundated by Searsville Dam in 1892. After financial misfortune and land disputes typical of the era, his lands were bought by Leland Stanford in November, 1882. Dennis Martin died in June 1890 and was buried at the St. Dennis Cemetery (Martin had built his own church) on his former property (by then Stanford's).

The creek's watershed includes the historic Thornewood House, a 1920s estate built by Julian Thorne and surrounded by 3.5 acres of landscaping and gorgeous valley views. This 87-acre estate was willed to the Sierra Club Foundation and later given to the Midpeninsula Regional Open Space District. Currently, the house and 10-acre private leasehold are closed and under restoration.

Schilling Lake is named for August Schilling, the “King of Spice”, who founded A. Schilling & Company in San Francisco in 1881. Schilling purchased the land from Julian Thorne, who purchased it from Edward Preston (attorney), who purchased it from the pioneer and lumberman, Dennis Martin.

== Watershed ==
Martin Creek drains second growth coast redwood (Sequoia sempervirens) forest as it descends the northeastern slope of the Santa Cruz Mountains. It traverses the Thornewood Open Space Preserve where it is met by an ephemeral stream that drains Schilling Lake. Shortly after crossing under Old La Honda Road the creek reaches the San Andreas Fault zone and crosses Portola Road where the ground becomes nearly level and it is one of a nexus of half a dozen creeks that coalesce in a large freshwater marsh to form Corte Madera Creek. Dennis Martin Creek flows into Sausal Creek just upstream of the reservoir area at the Family Farm Road bridge. From there Sausal Creek is joined by Corte Madera Creek just before entering Searsville Reservoir. Old maps show that Dennis Martin Creek and Alambique Creek, both tributaries of Sausal Creek, surrounded the historic town of Searsville before it was inundated by the Searsville Dam and Reservoir.

== Ecology ==
Dennis Martin Creek and the other Corte Madera Creek tributaries and mainstem were historically steelhead trout (Oncorhynchus mykiss) streams; however, access to the creek has been blocked since 1890 by Searsville Dam. According to local historian Dorothy Regnery's notes from her 1966 interview with Edgar H. Batchelder, who was 2 years old when his father became caretaker of Searsville dam in 1897, his "favorite place to fish for trout was in Dennis Martin Creek."

== Recreation ==
Hiking trails are available in the 167 acre Thornewood Open Space Preserve, part of the Midpeninsula Regional Open Space District system, including the Bridal Trail and an easy walk to Lake Schilling along the wooded 3/4 mile Schilling Lake Trail. The preserve is accessed from the south side of La Honda Road (Highway 84), 1.6 miles past its intersection with Portola Road in Woodside.

== See also ==
- List of watercourses in the San Francisco Bay Area

== Books ==
- Crane, Bo (2015). The Life and Times of Dennis Martin. Palo Alto, California: Bo Crane Books. ISBN 978-0-9962771-0-5.
