= Sausal Creek (San Mateo County) =

Sausal Creek Arroyo Sausal, Corte de Madera Creek

Location
- Country: United States
- State: California
- Region: San Mateo County
- City: Portola Valley, California

Physical characteristics
- Source: Northeast slope of the Santa Cruz Mountains
  - location: Portola Valley
  - coordinates: 37°22′07″N 122°13′16″W
  - elevation: 683 ft (208 m)372207N 1221316W
- Mouth: Confluence with Corte Madera Creek
  - location: Border of Portola Valley, California and Stanford University
  - coordinates: 37°23′52″N 122°14′36″W
  - elevation: 354 ft (108 m)

Basin features
- Tributaries
  - left: Bozzo Gulch, Neils Gulch, Bull Run Creek, Dennis Martin Creek

Sausal Creek is a 3.0-mile-long (4.8 km) northwesterly-flowing stream originating in Portola Valley along the northeastern edge of the Windy Hill Open Space Preserve in the eastern foothills of the Santa Cruz Mountains, in San Mateo County, California, United States. After being joined by Alambique Creek it flows through Middle Searsville Marsh/Pond before ending at its confluence with Corte Madera Creek in a natural marsh above Searsville Reservoir on Stanford University lands. Below Searsville Reservoir and Dam, Corte Madera Creek joins with Bear Creek to form San Francisquito Creek and flows to San Francisco Bay.

== History ==
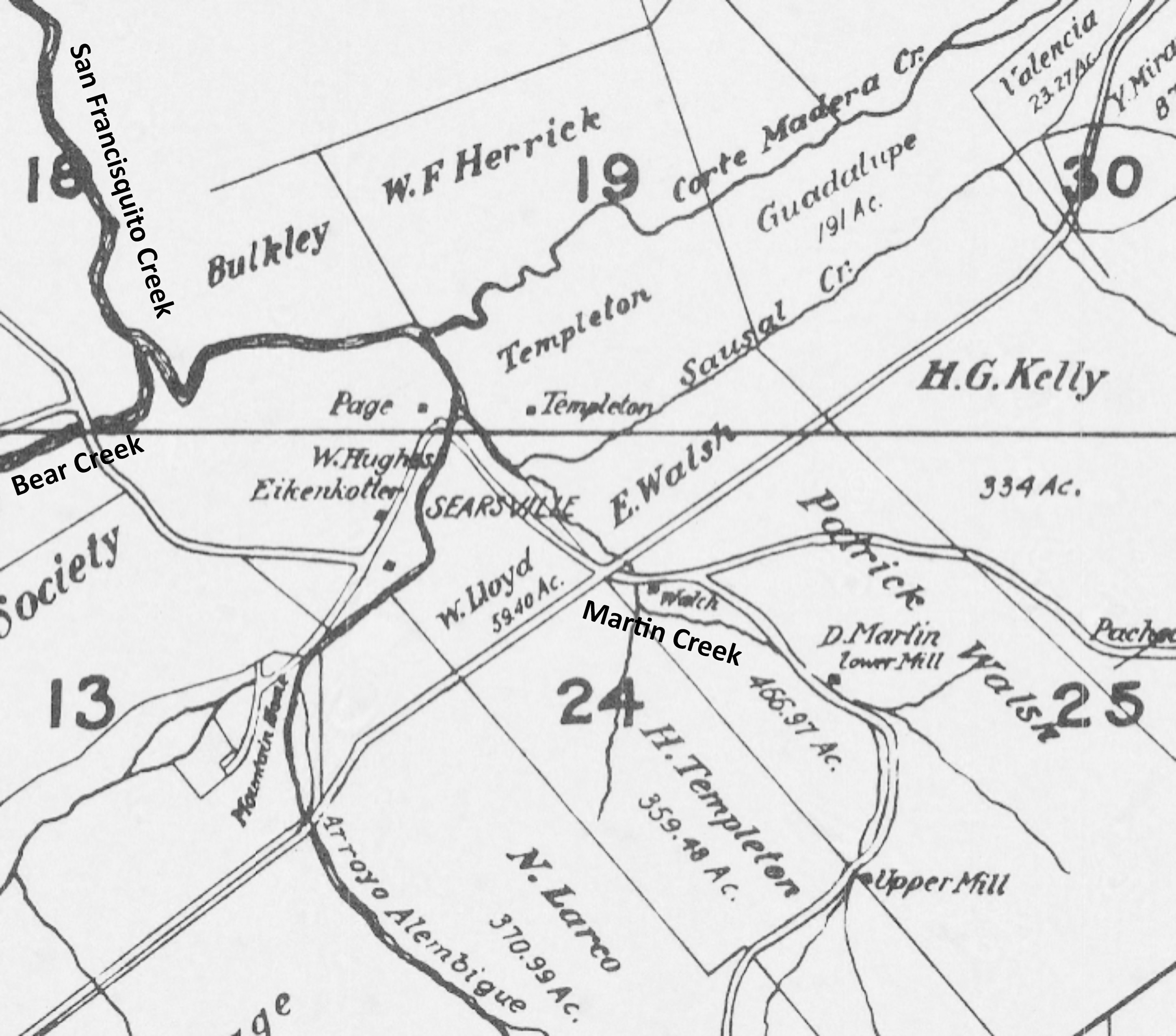
Snippet of Easton's 1868 Official San Mateo County Map showing the historical town of Searsville in between Alambique Creek (Arroyo Alembique) and Sausal Creek (and its Martin Creek tributary). Searsville was inundated by Searsville Dam and Reservoir in 1891. Modified to also show Bear Creek and San Francisquito Creek.

Historically, Sausal Creek also had the names Arroyo Sausal, Arroyo del Sanjon and Sanjon Creek. On the 1899 Palo Alto Topo Map its mainstem was called Corte de Madera Creek and its Neils Gulch tributary was called Sausal Creek. Sausal Creek flows through the Rancho Cañada del Corte de Madera meaning "a place where wood is cut", reflecting the importance of the timber industry in the early days of Portola Valley. "Sausal" is derived from the Spanish word "Sauce" or "Sauz" and mean "willow grove", a name that appears as early as 1853.

Bozzo Gulch is named for Emmanuel Bozzo who had a ranch at the head of the canyon in the 1860s.

Neils Gulch seems to have been modified from Neel Gulch, after David H. Neel, an 1850s settler. It also was called Cañada de Sansevan and Hallidie Gulch.

Bull Run Creek was named by a Southern sympathizer following the Union defeat at the Battle of Bull Run in the early 1860s. It has also been known as Sausal Creek, Willow Creek, Kelley Gulch, Uval Creek, Cañada de Sansevan for William Nichols Sansevain and Smith Gulch, for William R. Smith's steam-powered sawmill.

== Watershed ==
Sausal Creek heads just west of Willowbrook Drive in Portola Valley and is circled by the Spring Ridge Trail and Betsy Crowder Trail where it is dammed to form Sausal Pond. After receiving Bozzo Gulch, Niels Gulch and Bull Run Creek from the left. It runs northwest in the San Andreas Fault zone and after crossing Family Farm Road off Portola Road it is one of a nexus of half a dozen creeks that coalesce in a large natural freshwater marsh to form Corte Madera Creek. Dennis Martin Creek flows into Sausal Creek just upstream of the reservoir area at the Family Farm Road bridge. From there Sausal Creek enters Searsville Reservoir. Old maps suggest that Dennis Martin Creek and Alambique Creek were tributary to Sausal Creek.

== Conservation ==
For decades a 630 feet long section of Sausal Creek was buried in an underground culvert. In a compromise between creek preservationists and those who wanted a larger softball field, half the creek was daylighted along with construction of the new Portola Valley Town Center.

== See also ==
- List of watercourses in the San Francisco Bay Area
