= Corte Madera Creek (San Mateo County) =

Corte Madera Creek Corte De Madera Creek
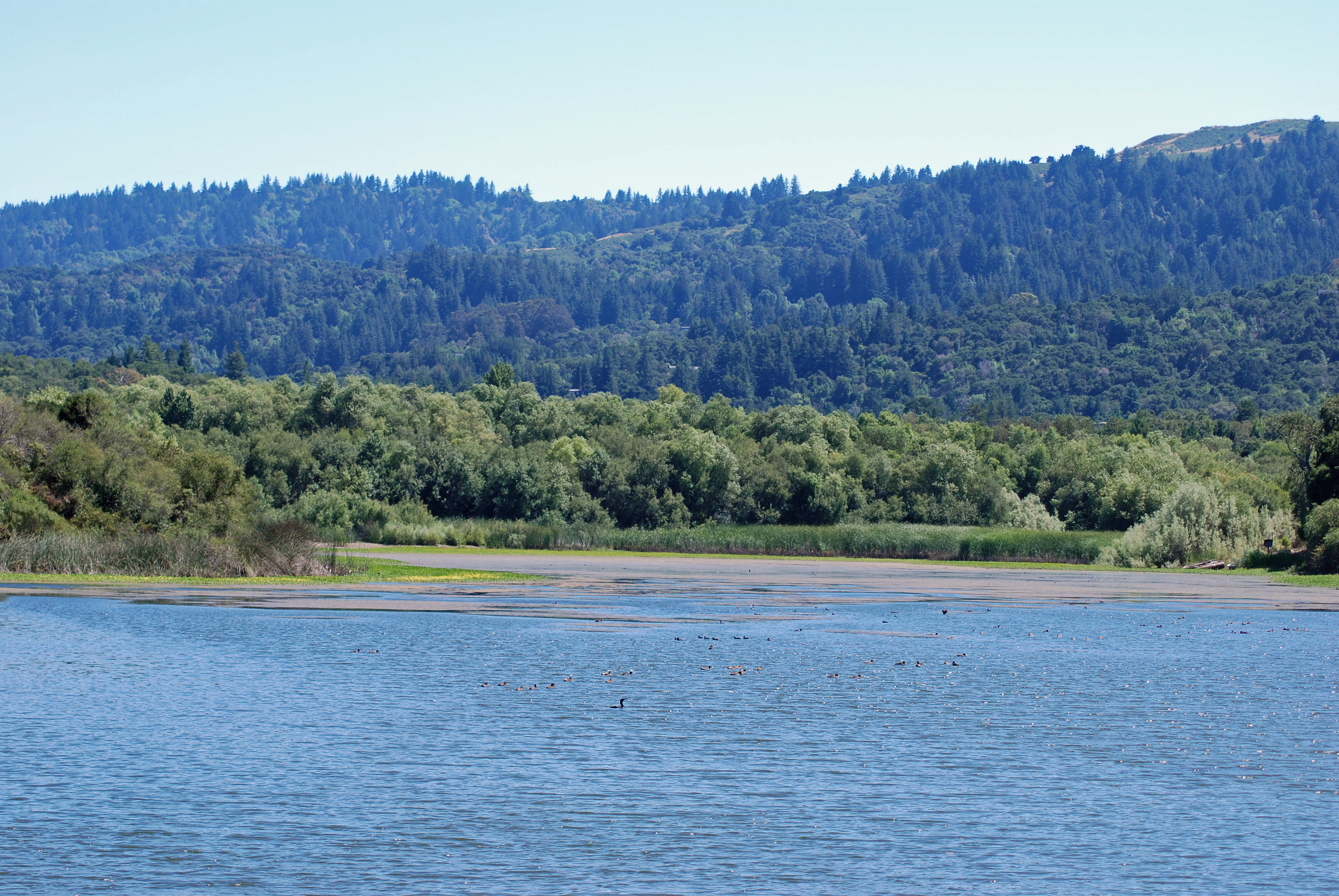
- Looking south across Searsville Reservoir from the dam on Corte Madera Creek

- Location of the mouth in California
- Etymology: Spanish language

Location
- Country: United States
- State: California
- Region: Southeastern San Mateo County
- City: Portola Valley, California

Physical characteristics
- Source
  - location: Russian Ridge Open Space Preserve.
  - coordinates: 37°19′26″N 122°11′24″W
  - elevation: 1,950 ft (590 m)
- Mouth: Searsville Lake
  - location: Portola Valley, California
  - coordinates: 37°24′03″N 122°14′18″W
  - elevation: 351 ft (107 m)

Basin features
- Tributaries
  - left: Coal Creek, Gulch Creek, Rengstorff Gulch, Damiani Creek, Jones Gulch, Hamms Gulch, Alambique Creek, Dennis Martin Creek, Sausal Creek
  - right: Westridge Creek

Corte Madera Creek (Spanish for "a place where wood is cut") is a 7.3-mile-long (11.7 km) creek that flows north-northwest to Searsville Dam and then joins with Bear Creek to form San Francisquito Creek in California.

== History ==
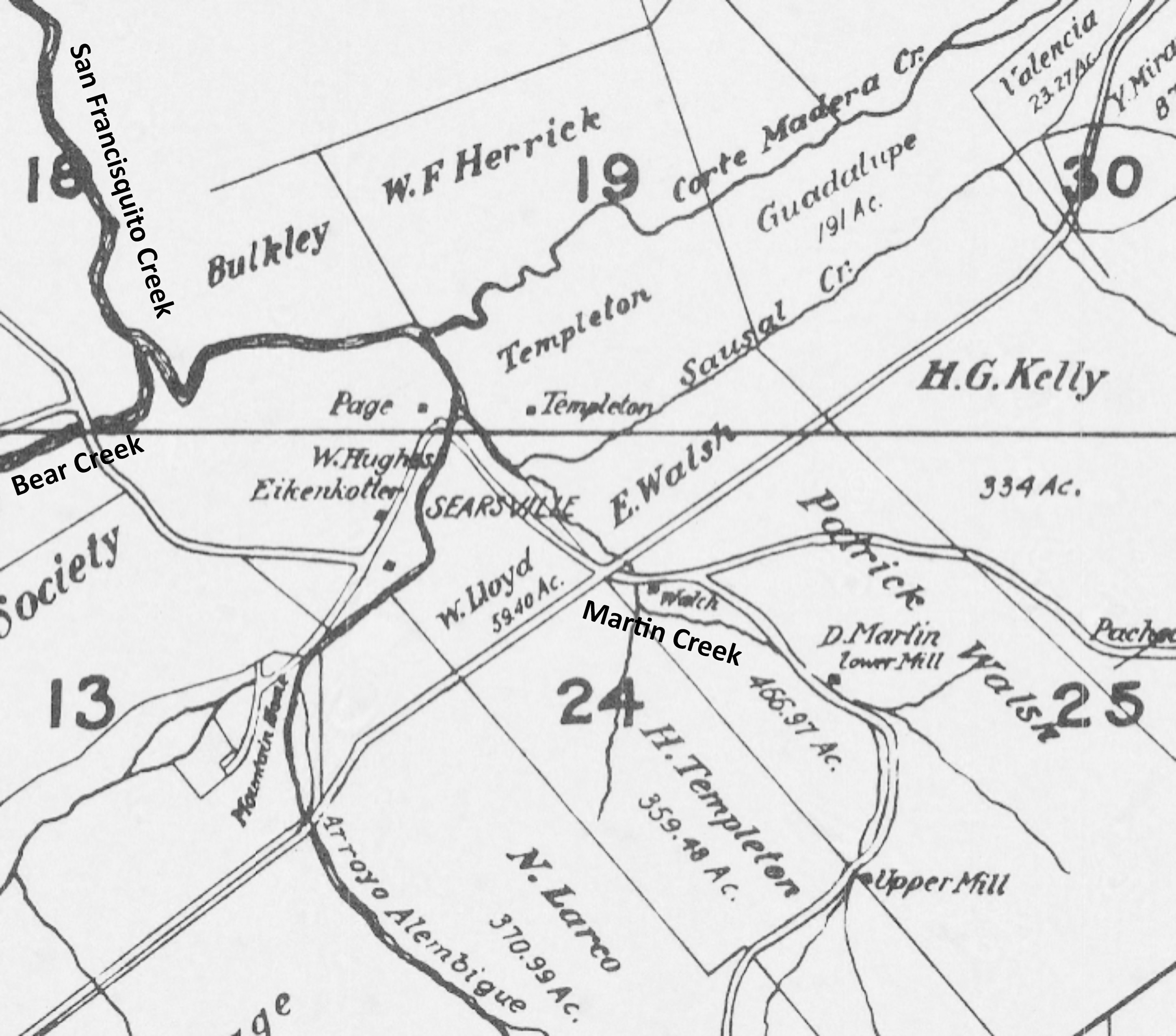
Snippet of Easton's 1868 Official San Mateo County Map showing the historical town of Searsville in between Alambique Creek (Arroyo Alembique) and Sausal Creek (and its Martin Creek tributary). Searsville was inundated by Searsville Dam and Reservoir in 1891. Modified to also show Bear Creek and San Francisquito Creek.

Historically Corte de Madera Creek ran through the Rancho Cañada del Corte de Madera and Rancho Corte de Madera land grants (the latter surrounding the former). Corte Madera Creek was dammed in 1892, creating Searsville Reservoir, which inundated the historic town of Searsville.

== Ecology ==
Corte Madera Creek was historically an anadromous steelhead (Oncorhynchus mykiss) spawning stream; however, access to the creek has been blocked since 1890 by Searsville Dam. Although steelhead can no longer run above Searsville Dam to spawn, stream resident rainbow trout populations persist in upper Corte Madera Creek and its tributaries. These rainbow trout possess the historical (pre-dam) anadromous steelhead trout genetics and were never introgressed by hatchery-origin fish. However, above dam trout generally suffer from inbreeding depression. Elimination of Searsville dam could restore 20 miles (32 km) of anadromous steelhead habitat in the Corte Madera Creek mainstem and its multiple tributaries. In 2014 a systematic study of 1,400 plus dams in California identified Searsville Dam as a high-priority candidate to improve environmental flows for native fish conservation.

In a 1996 biotic assessment of upper Searsville Lake and the lower floodplain of Corte Madera Creek, Stanford biologists wrote that the native species likely included steelhead/coastal rainbow trout (Oncorhynchus mykiss irideus), sculpin, California roach (Hesperoleucas symmetricus), hitch (Lavinia exilcauda), speckled dace (Rhinichthys osculus), Sacramento sucker (Catostomus occidentalis), Pacific lamprey (Entosphenus tridentatus), and perhaps three-spined stickleback (Gasterosteus aculeatus), Sacramento pikeminnow (Ptychocheilus grandis), Sacramento blackfish (Orthodon microlepidontus), and coho salmon (Oncorhynchus kisutch). They noted that the only native species observed with any regularity in the study area are Sacramento sucker and rainbow trout, and attributed the now depauperate native fish fauna to dislocation of hydrologic connectivity due to the dam, transformation of the habitat above the dam from lotic to lentic, and the fact that Searsville Reservoir harbors many non-native species of centrarchid fishes (sunfish, black bass, and crappie) which prey on virtually all historically native fishes. They noted that federally threatened California red-legged frogs (Rana draytonii) occur in the lotic portions of Corte Madera Creek below the dam but not above, likely due to depredation by non-native fish and American bullfrogs (Lithobates catesbeiana).

The extent by which Searsville Reservoir serves as a source for non-native species was illustrated when Stanford biologists studied the aquatic fauna found in the plunge pool below the Searsville dam spillway. The plunge pool was drained in 2013 to allow for a safety inspection of the base of the dam. Native species found when the plunge pool was pumped dry include two steelhead trout, 26 California roach and 22 Sacramento suckers. In contrast, more than 1,500 non-native fishes were encountered during the dewatering process, including over 500 sunfish including green sunfish (Lepomis cyanellus), bluegill (Lepomis macrochirus) and likely redear sunfish (Lepomis microlophus), two bullhead catfish (Ameiurus species) and over 1,000 mosquitofish (Gambusia affinis). Other non-native species in the plunge pool included 500 bullfrogs and 150 Louisiana red swamp crayfish.

In the spring of 1991, an adult steelhead (0.74m) was observed jumping at the base of Searsville Dam. In May 2002, the San Francisquito Watershed Council released a barrier survey including Corte Madera Creek. A private bridge apron adjacent to Willowbrook Drive and another downstream of the confluence with Damiani Creek were described as impassable barriers to upstream migrating steelhead. In 2014 a systematic study of 1,400 plus dams in California identified Searsville Dam as a high-priority candidate to improve environmental flows for native fish conservation.

Illegal fishing of rainbow trout (stream resident forms of O. m. irideus) has occurred in several places along Corte Madera Creek with significant damage to the surviving populations of native rainbows. In addition, there are also several private ponds stocked with warm water non-native species, such as Smallmouth Bass, Redear Sunfish and Bluegill that threaten the surviving native trout population fry and eggs. The most notable pond is on Iroquois Trail and empties into Corte Madera Creek through a single outlet which floods during El Niño, or a wet winter.

== Watershed ==
Corte Madera Creek has its origin just northeast of Borel Hill in the Coal Creek Open Space Preserve (part of the Midpeninsula Regional Open Space District), and follows Alpine Road northwesterly along the San Andreas Fault to pick up Coal Creek, Rengstorff Gulch, Damiani Creek, Jones Gulch, Hamms Gulch - all draining the northeastern slope of the Santa Cruz Mountains. It levels out upon reaching Portola Valley and crosses under Portola Road at Brookside Drive. Before reaching Searsville Reservoir it arrives in a large laguna or freshwater marsh formed by the nexus of several creeks, including Westbridge Creek, Sausal Creek, Dennis Martin Creek, and Alambique Creek.

Just south of the intersection of Mountain Home Road and Portola Road, Alambique Creek enters a historic wetland pond (Lloyd's Pond) which is currently impounded by the road-fill of Portola Road and a culvert. From there Alambique Creek flows under Portola Road into the upper Searsville Reservoir at its confluence with Sausal Creek. Dennis Martin Creek flows into Sausal Creek just upstream of the reservoir area at the Family Farm Road bridge. From there Sausal Creek joins enters Searsville Reservoir. Corte Madera Creek enters Searsville Reservoir further to the east. Old maps suggest that Dennis Martin Creek and Alambique Creek were historically tributary to Sausal Creek. This unique confluence of streams and natural wetlands was submerged and buried with sediment due to the construction of Searsville Dam and the siltation of the reservoir.

Below Searsville Dam Corte Madera Creek joins with Bear Creek to form San Francisquito Creek.

Photos of the Corte Madera Creek Watershed
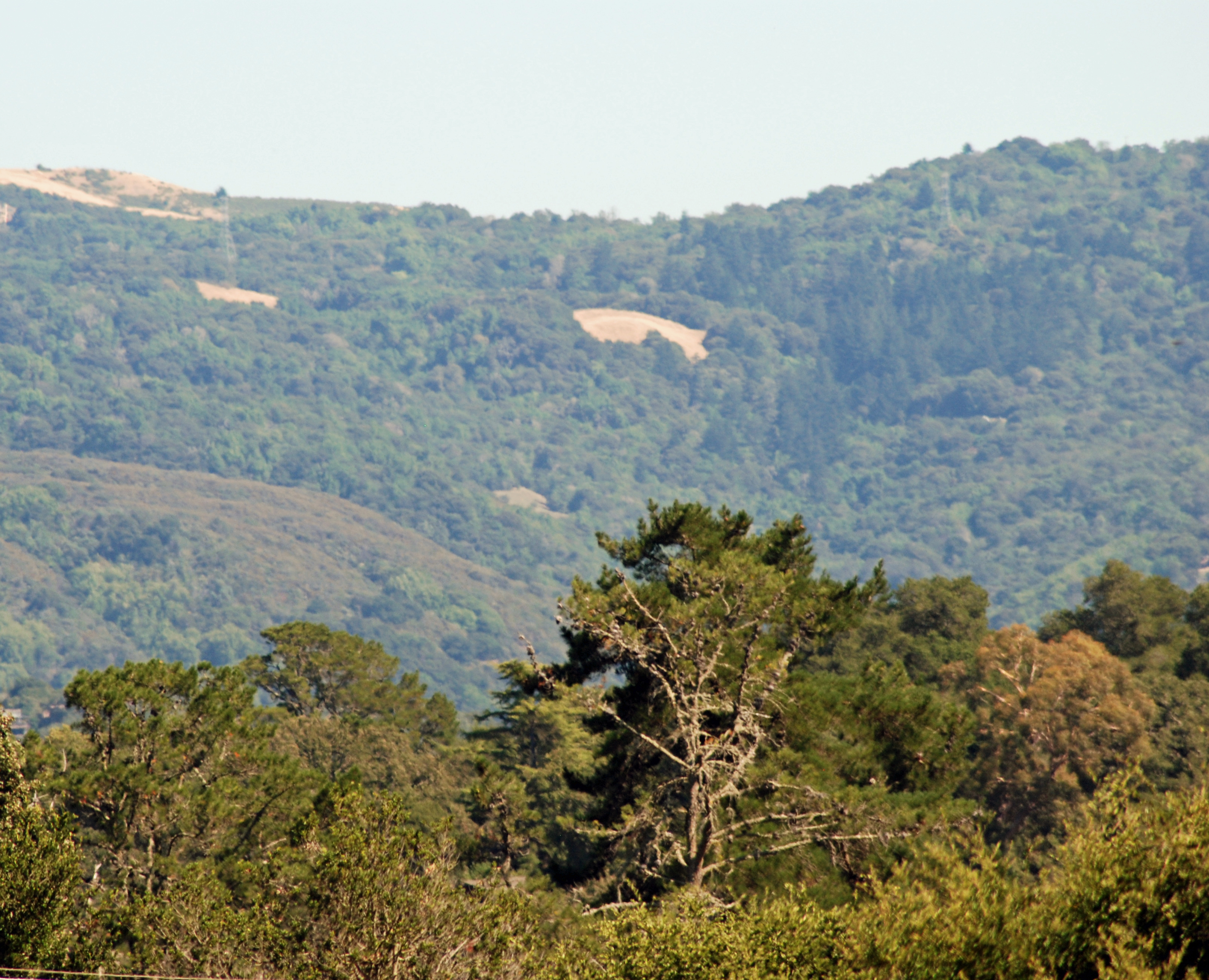
Shot looking southeast from Jasper Ridge's Sun Field Station up the Corte Madera Creek watershed with Russian Ridge on the right and Montebello Ridge on the left.

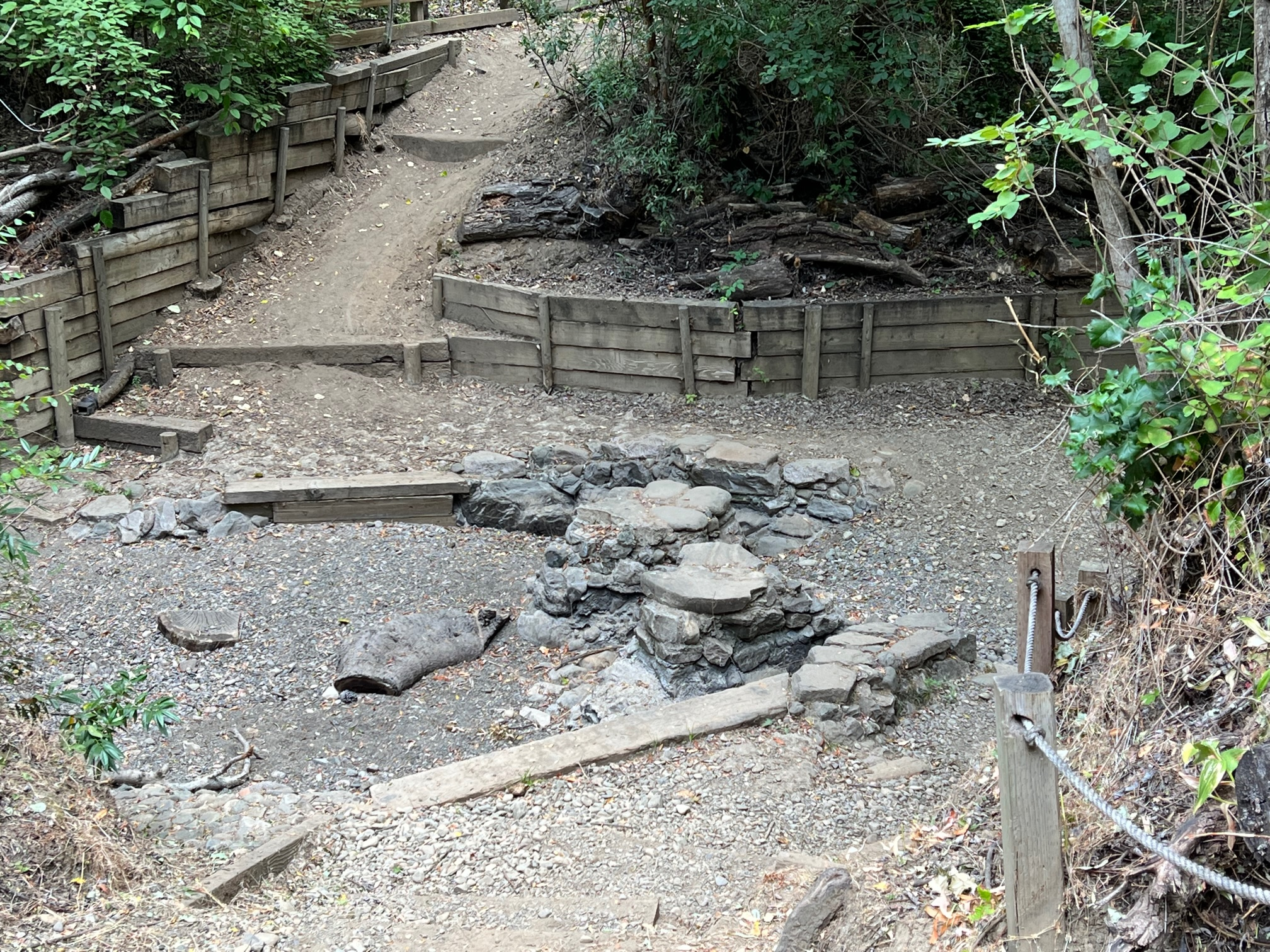
Stepping stones across dry Corte Madera Creek on trail from Trail Lane to Mapache Drive Trail, Portola Valley July 2021

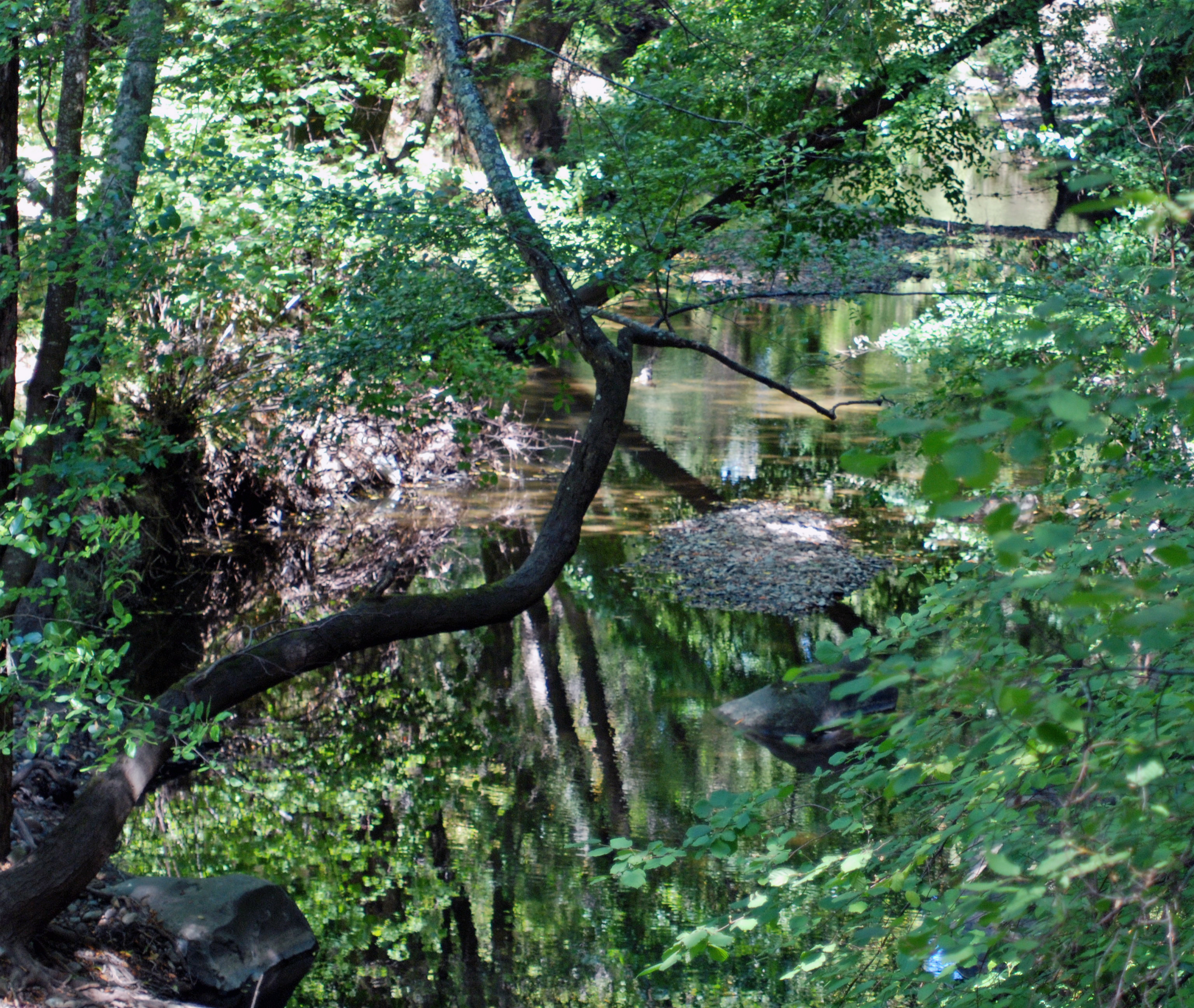
Corte Madera Creek just below Searsville Dam July 2011

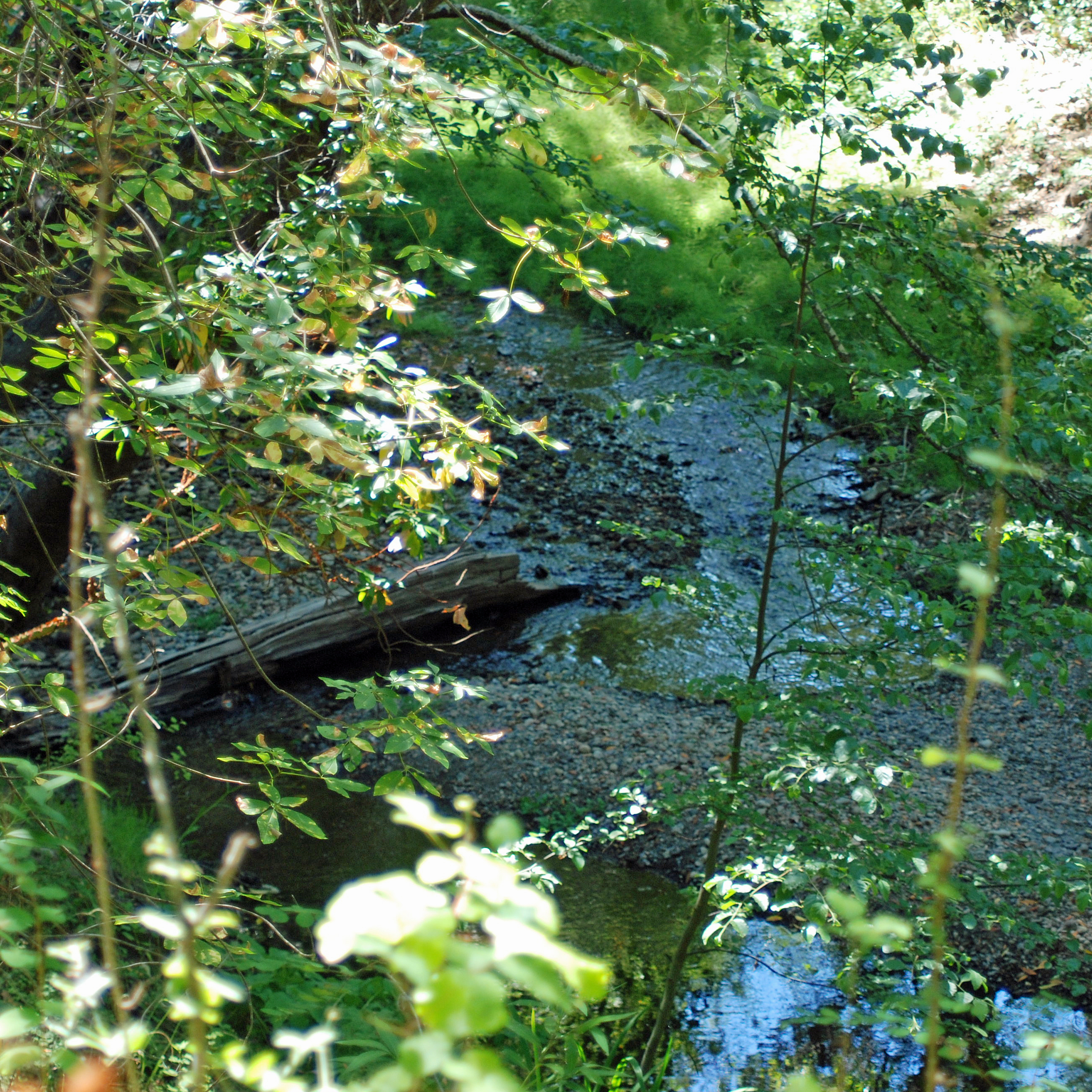
Mouth of Corte Madera Creek (left) at its confluence with Bear Creek (right) forming the San Francisquito Creek mainstem below Searsville Dam

== See also ==
- List of watercourses in the San Francisco Bay Area
- Searsville Dam
- San Francisquito Creek
