= Ladera, California =

Ladera
- census-designated place
- Location of Ladera in San Mateo County, California.

- Location within the state of California Ladera (the United States)
- Coordinates: 37°23′58″N 122°11′50″W
- Country: United States
- State: California
- County: San Mateo

Government
  - Type: Community Association

Area
  - Total: 0.43 sq mi (1.11 km^{2})
  - Land: 0.43 sq mi (1.11 km^{2})
  - Water: 0 sq mi (0 km^{2}) 0%
- Elevation: 315 ft (96 m)

Population (2020)
  - Total: 1,557
  - Density: 3,630/sq mi (1,400/km^{2})
- Time zone: UTC-8 (Pacific (PST))
  - Summer (DST): UTC-7 (PDT)
- ZIP codes: 94028
- Area code: 650
- FIPS code: 06-39094
- GNIS feature ID: 2628745

Ladera is a census-designated place (CDP) in southern San Mateo County, California, United States, adjacent to Portola Valley. Primarily a residential community, it comprises approximately 520 homes, governed by the Ladera Community Association. The ZIP Code is 94028 and the community is inside area code 650. The population was 1,557 at the 2020 census.

== Geography ==
Ladera is located at the bottom of the eastern slope of the Peninsula Range of the Santa Cruz Mountains. It is bordered on the west by the Jasper Ridge Biological Preserve operated by Stanford University, on the east by Alpine Road, and on the north by Webb Ranch.

According to the United States Census Bureau, the CDP covers an area of 0.4 square mile (1.1 km^{2}), all land.

== History ==
The Ramaytush Ohlone peoples occupied the land that is now the community of Ladera, prior to the settlement of California by the Spanish. Ladera is located on the Rancho Corte de Madera Mexican land grant.

The land was used for grazing and timber through 1927 when it was joined to the Ormondale Ranch, owned by the Macdonough family. The Macdonoughs raised cattle and sheep, and bred racehorses; their most famous stud, Ormonde, had raced in England and never lost a race. In the 1930s, the majority of the Ormondale Ranch land was developed and incorporated into Portola Valley.

In 1944, the Peninsula Housing Association (PHA) was formed with the goal of purchasing a tract of land and developing a housing cooperative. Several prominent members of the Stanford and Palo Alto communities joined to develop the fledgling PHA co-op. It began subscribing members in 1945 and its 150 members purchased the remaining 260 acres (1.1 km^{2}) of the former Ormondale ranch for $155,000 on July 31, 1946. The co-op selected noted landscape architect Garrett Eckbo to lay out the design for the new community. Architects Joseph Allen Stein and John Funk were chosen to design several of the earliest model homes.

The members chose the name Ladera (over alternatives Lark Hills and New Rochdale) to reflect the Spanish history of the land — ladera is Spanish for hillside. Streets are Spanish phrases or botanical names. Early members of the cooperative included author Wallace Stegner and Klystron tube inventor Sigurd Varian of Varian Associates. (Varian had grown up in Halcyon, another intentional community in southern California.)

The PHA refused to place restrictive covenants on title deeds. However, the Federal Housing Administration would not insure loans to co-ops that included African American members - an example of redlining. Banks would not finance loans or issue mortgages without government approval, so the PHA failed due to financial difficulties after only a few houses had been constructed. The co-op proposed the inclusion of a quota system, promising that the proportion of African American members would not exceed the proportion of African Americans in California's overall population. This stipulation was not sufficient for the government. The land was later sold to Hare, Brewer, and Kelley, who completed the development. Directly following completion, single family homes in the development were only sold to whites. Four non-white families were required to sell their land. These types of provisions were mostly legally unenforceable after Shelley v. Kraemer (1948) though they continued to be added and privately unenforceable after the Fair Housing Act of 1968 (see Housing discrimination in the United States).

In November 2021, following a two-and-a-half-month petition drive that achieved signatures from owners of 391 of the 534 properties in Ladera, the clause forbidding residency by people "other than those of the Caucasian or white race" was replaced by the statement: "By provisions outlined in this document the Ladera Community has formally acted to remove the Race Restriction that previously comprised this subsection, and by so doing asserts that the Ladera Community supports diversity, equity, and inclusion."

== Demographics ==
Historical population
Census	Pop.	Note	%±
2010	1,426		—
2020	1,557		9.2%
U.S. Decennial Census; 1850–1870 1880-1890; 1900 1910 1920; 1930 1940 1950; 1960 1970 1980; 1990 2000 2010

=== 2020 census ===
As of the 2020 census, Ladera had a population of 1,557. The population density was 3,620.9 inhabitants per square mile (1,398.0/km^{2}). 100.0% of residents lived in urban areas, while 0.0% lived in rural areas.

Racial composition as of the 2020 census
Race	Number	Percent
White	1,166	74.9%
Black or African American	4	0.3%
American Indian and Alaska Native	1	0.1%
Asian	169	10.9%
Native Hawaiian and Other Pacific Islander	0	0.0%
Some other race	17	1.1%
Two or more races	200	12.8%
Hispanic or Latino (of any race)	105	6.7%

The whole population lived in households. There were 538 households, out of which 194 (36.1%) had children under the age of 18 living in them, 400 (74.3%) were married-couple households, 24 (4.5%) were cohabiting couple households, 71 (13.2%) had a female householder with no spouse or partner present, and 43 (8.0%) had a male householder with no spouse or partner present. About 69 households (12.8%) were one person, and 40 (7.4%) were one person aged 65 or older. The average household size was 2.89. There were 440 families (81.8% of all households).

The age distribution was 395 people (25.4%) under the age of 18, 111 people (7.1%) aged 18 to 24, 248 people (15.9%) aged 25 to 44, 461 people (29.6%) aged 45 to 64, and 342 people (22.0%) who were 65 years of age or older. The median age was 45.8 years. For every 100 females, there were 98.9 males, and for every 100 females age 18 and over there were 95.6 males age 18 and over.

There were 551 housing units at an average density of 1,281.4 units per square mile (494.8 units/km^{2}), of which 538 (97.6%) were occupied. Of these, 477 (88.7%) were owner-occupied, and 61 (11.3%) were occupied by renters. Of all housing units, 2.4% were vacant. The homeowner vacancy rate was 0.2% and the rental vacancy rate was 4.7%.

=== 2010 census ===
Ladera first appeared as a census designated place in the 2010 U.S. census.

=== Education ===
According to Business Insider, as of December 2018 Ladera is the most educated town in the United States.

== Political and economic ==
As an unincorporated area, Ladera lies in the sphere of influence of Portola Valley. It draws its police services from the County of San Mateo and is a part of Woodside Fire District.

School districts that serve Ladera include the Las Lomitas Elementary School District for elementary and middle school and the Sequoia Union High School District for high school. The local school in the community is leased to the private Woodland School.

Along Alpine Road are two small commercial developments: a small shopping center to the north of La Mesa and an office complex south of La Mesa.
