= Rancho Corte de Madera =

Mexican land grant in California

Coordinates: 37.390°N 122.190°W

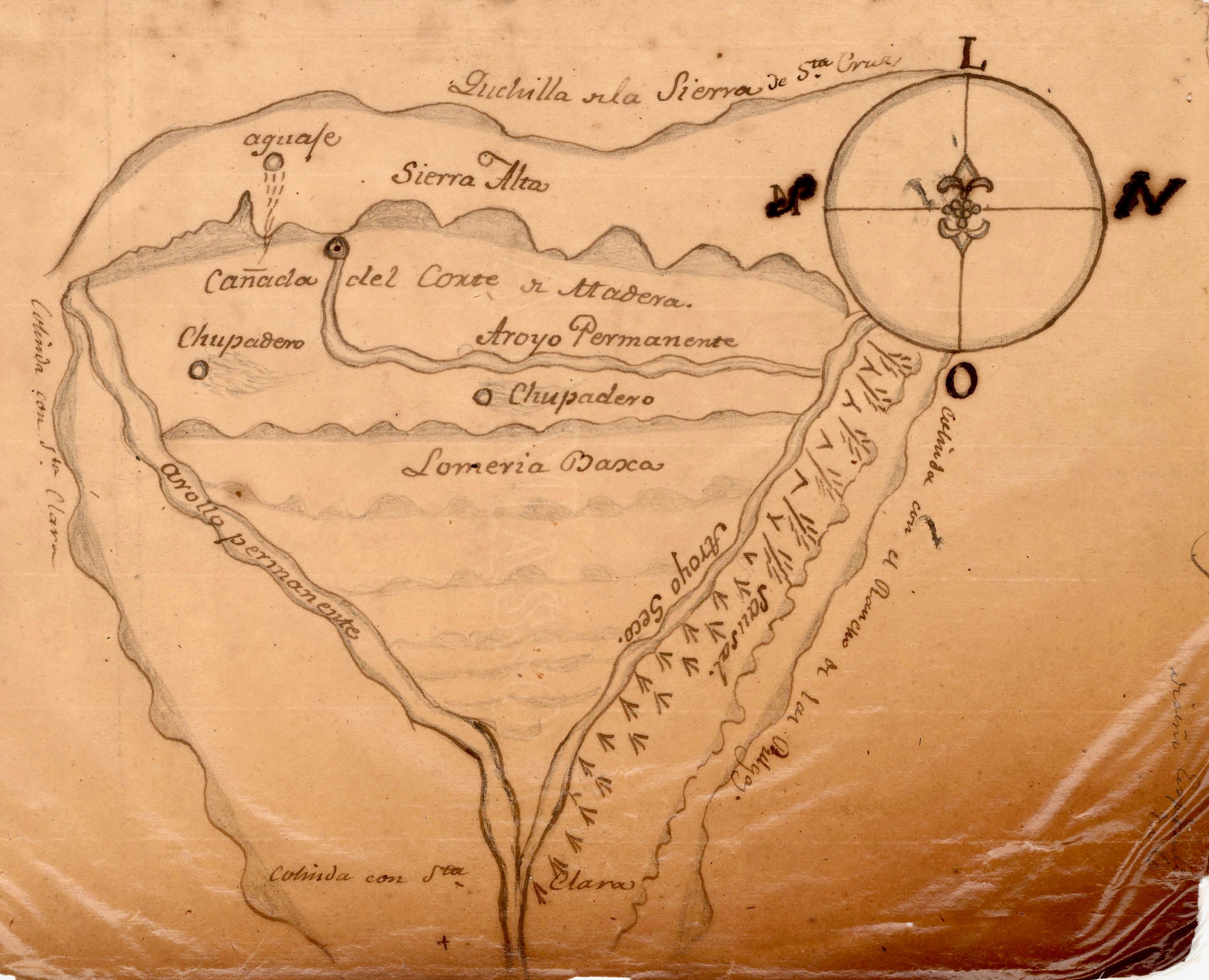
1833 diseño of land grant

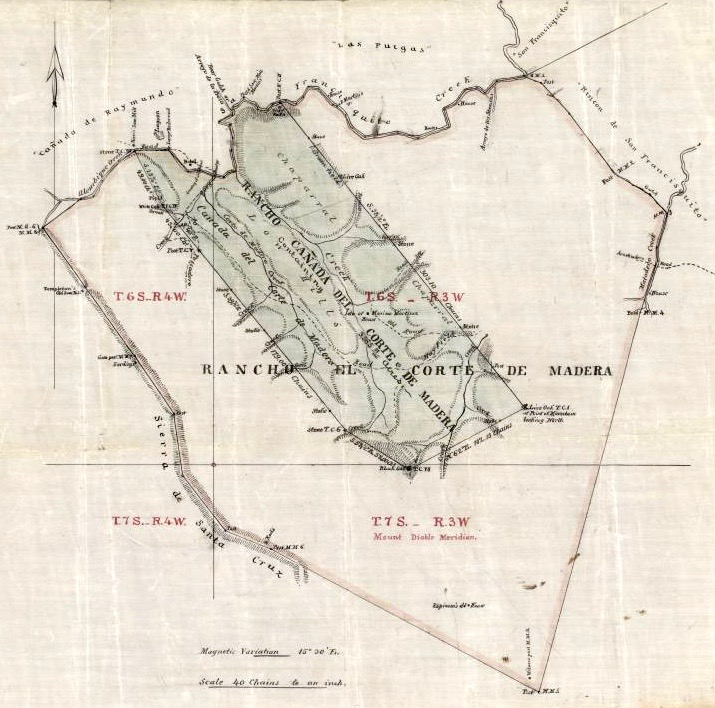
Surveyed map of 1857

Rancho el Corte de Madera was a 13,316-acre (53.89 km^{2}) Mexican land grant in present day Santa Clara County, California given in 1844 by Governor Manuel Micheltorena to Máximo Martínez. The name translates as "the place where lumber is cut". The roughly triangular shaped grant was west of today's I-280, and bounded on the north by Alambique Creek and San Francisquito Creek, on the south by Los Trancos Creek and Matadero Creek, and on the west by what is now Skyline Boulevard. The grant surrounded Rancho Cañada del Corte de Madera which extended along the Portola Valley. The land grant included parts of present day Woodside, Ladera and Stanford University.

== History ==
Máximo Martínez and José Domingo Peralta had been granted Rancho Cañada del Corte de Madera in 1833 by Governor José Figueroa. Peralta sold his share in the property to Martínez in 1835, and returned to Rancho San Antonio. In 1844 Máximo Martínez was granted the surrounding two square league Rancho Corte de Madera by Governor Micheltorena.

Máximo Martínez (1792 - 1863) had been a soldier in San Francisco from 1819 until 1827. He was regidor (councilman) in the Pueblo of San José in 1833. He married Damiana Padilla, and in 1834 the couple moved onto his Rancho Cañada del Corte de Madera, until his death in 1863.

With the cession of California to the United States following the Mexican-American War, the 1848 Treaty of Guadalupe Hidalgo provided that the land grants would be honored. As required by the Land Act of 1851, a claim for Rancho Corte de Madera was filed with the Public Land Commission in 1852, and the grant was patented to Máximo Martínez in 1858.
