= Rancho Cañada del Corte de Madera =

Mexican land grant in California

Coordinates: 37.390°N 122.190°W

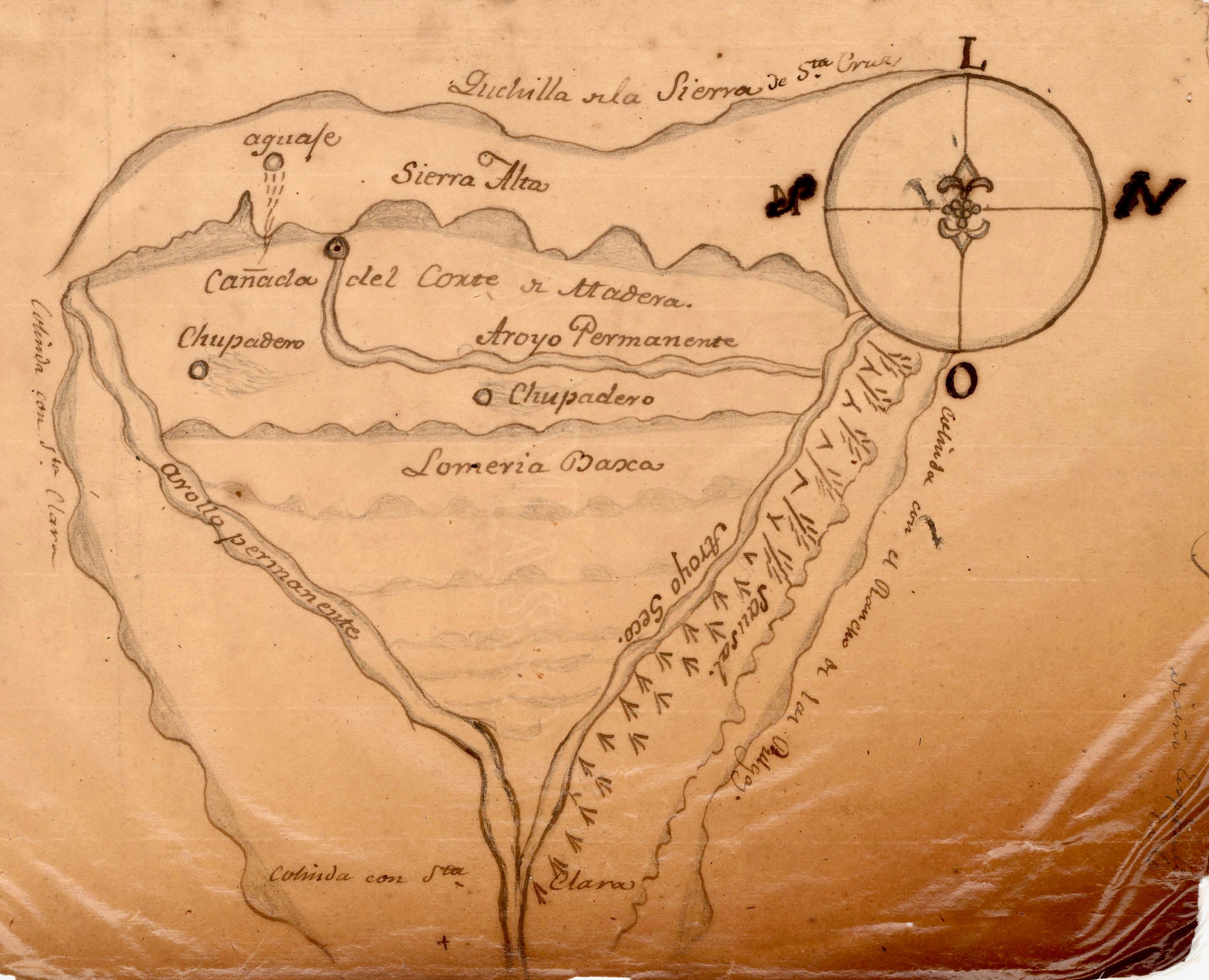
1833 diseño of land grant

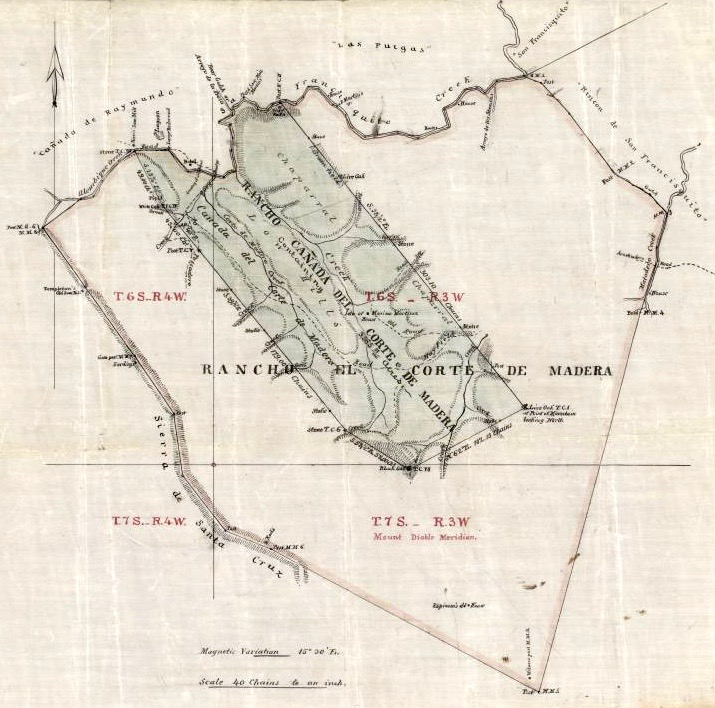
Surveyed map of 1857

Rancho Cañada del Corte de Madera was a 3,566-acre (14.43 km^{2}) Mexican land grant in present day Santa Clara County, California given in 1833 by Governor José Figueroa to José Domingo Peralta and Máximo Martínez. The name translates as "the valley where lumber is cut". The grant was located west of today's I-280, and south of San Francisquito Creek near Searsville Lake, and covered most of the Portola Valley.

== History ==
Mexican governor, José Figueroa, granted one square league to Máximo Martínez and José Domingo Peralta in 1833. José Domingo Peralta's father, Luís María Peralta, was the grantee of Rancho San Antonio. In 1821, José Domingo Peralta (1795–1865) married Paulina Antonio de Garcia Pacheco (d. 1833), whose father was the grantee of Rancho San Ramon. After the death of his wife, Domingo Peralta sold his share in the property to Martinez in 1834, and returned to Rancho San Antonio.

Máximo Martínez (1792–1863) had been a soldier in San Francisco from 1819 until 1827. He was regidor (councilman) in the Pueblo of San José in 1833. He married Damiana Padilla, and in 1834 the couple moved onto his rancho, until his death in 1863. In 1844 Máximo Martínez was granted the surrounding Rancho el Corte de Madera by Governor Manuel Micheltorena.

With the cession of California to the United States following the Mexican-American War, the 1848 Treaty of Guadalupe Hidalgo provided that the land grants would be honored. As required by the Land Act of 1851, a claim for Rancho Cañada del Corte de Madera was filed by Máximo Martínez with the Public Land Commission in 1852. The grant was patented to Máximo Martínez in 1858, for 13,316.05 acres.

A separate claim was filed by Domingo Peralta. In 1857, Cipriano Thurn and Horace Carpentier, Domingo Peralta's attorneys, claimed one-half of the rancho for Peralta, disputing the alleged sale in 1834 of one half of the rancho to Martínez. In 1882, Cipriano Thurn and Horace Carpentier were patented 3,565.91 acres.

Local historian Dorothy F. Regnery believes that this rancho was obtained in less than honest fashion. Appendix B of her book outlines a case that the survey was fraudulent and that the claims were denied in court in 1865 (Judgement Book E, p. 672).
