= Searsville, California =

Searsville
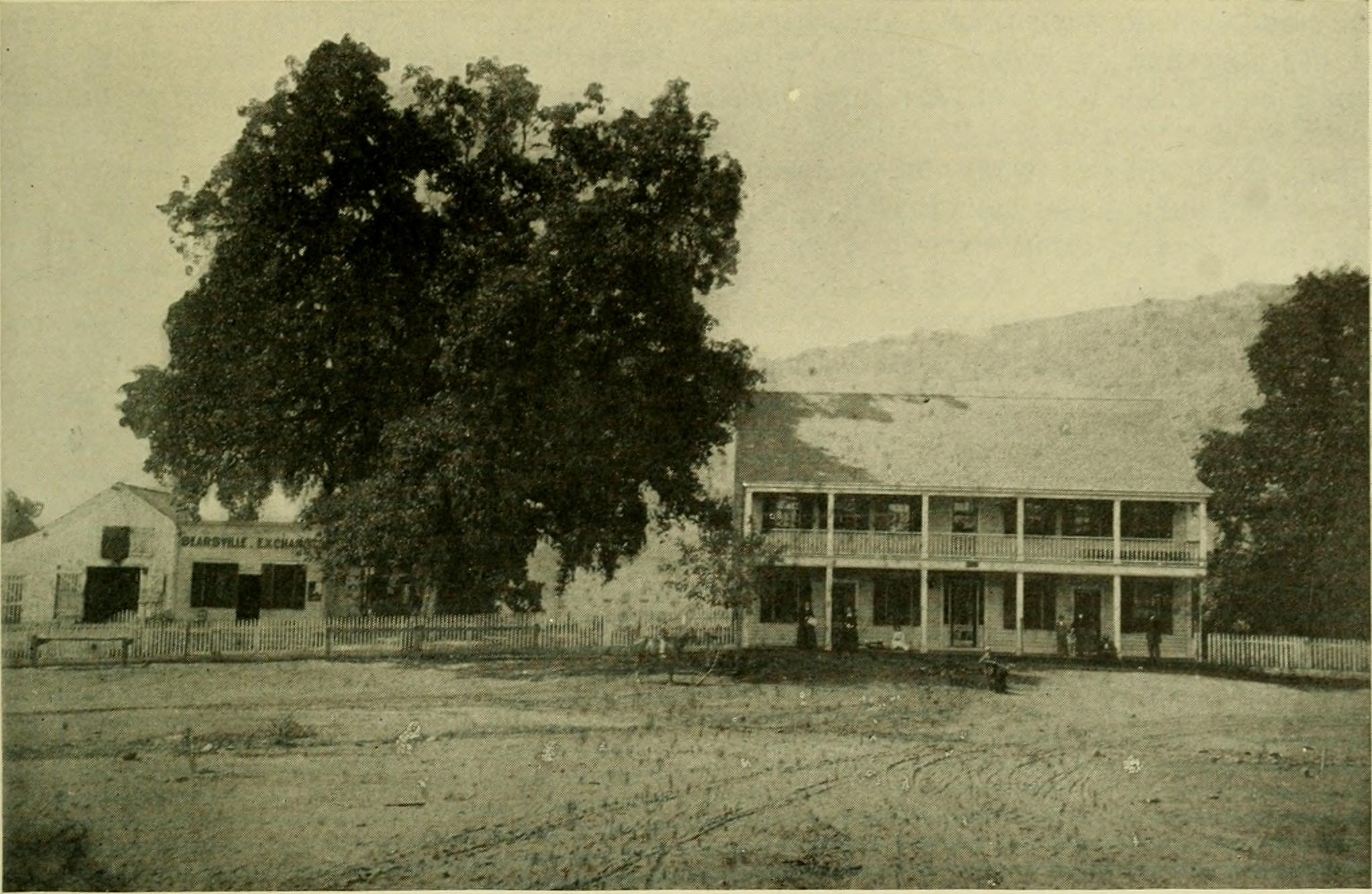
- Image of Eikerenkotters store and hotel, the center of Searsville activity

- Location within California Location within the United States
- 37°24′25″N 122°14′16″W
- Location: Searsville Lake, Woodside, California

History
- Built: c.1854

Site notes
- Governing body: California State Parks

California Historical Landmark
- Designated: 1950
- Reference no.: 474

Searsville (c.1854–1891) was a San Mateo County, California town located in what is now the Jasper Ridge Biological Preserve on Corte Madera Creek and adjacent to Woodside. At the northwest corner of Sandhill Road and Portola Road is a plaque, and this location has been a California Historical Landmark since 1950.

== History ==
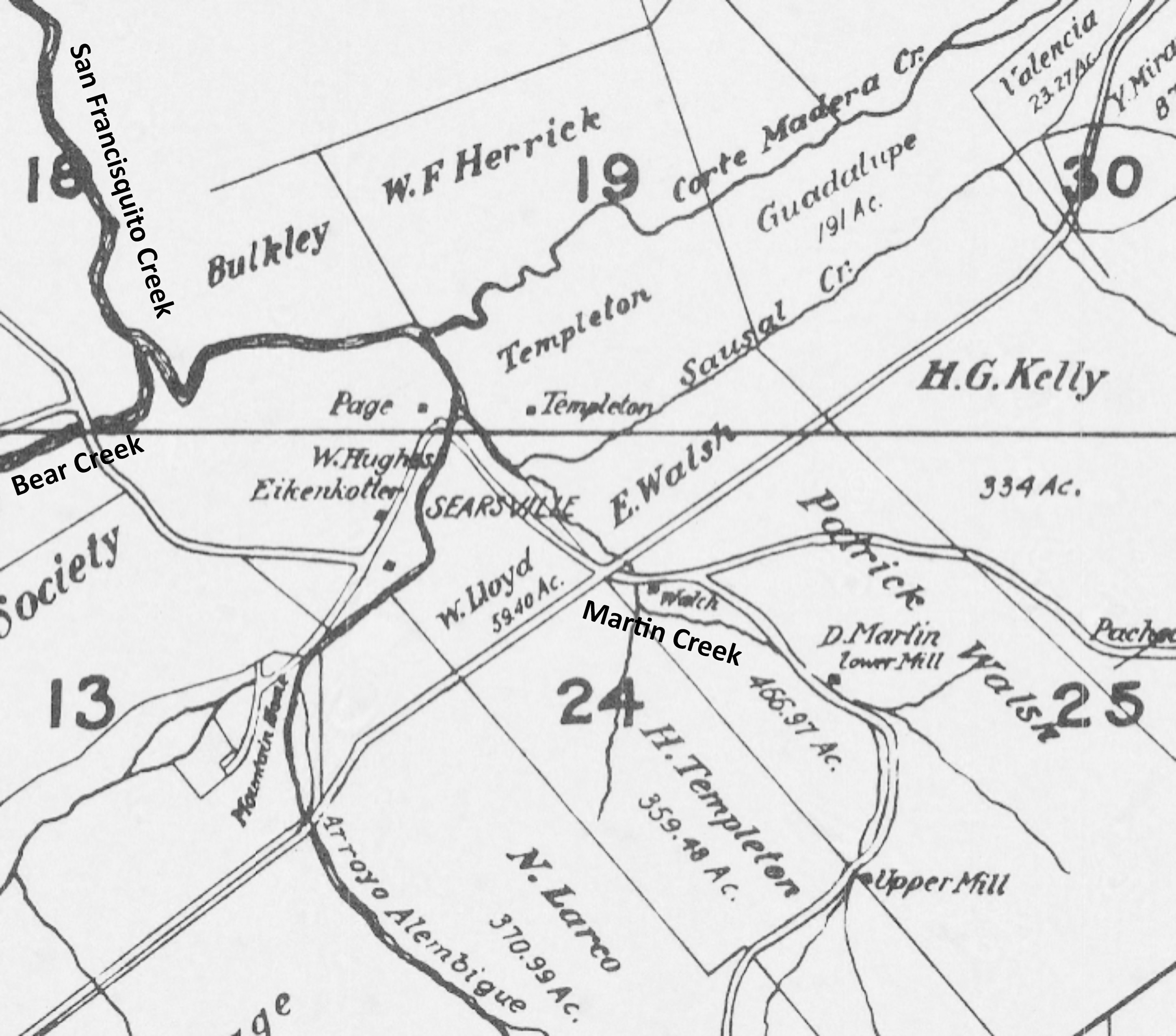
Snippet of Easton's 1868 Official San Mateo County Map showing the historical town of Searsville between Alambique Creek (Arroyo Alembique) and Sausal Creek (and its Martin Creek tributary). Searsville was inundated by Searsville Dam and Reservoir in 1891. Modified to also show Bear Creek and San Francisquito Creek.

Charles Brown, a former whaler from San Francisco, purchased a portion of the Rancho Cañada de Raymundo Mexican-era land grant of John Coppinger and settled there with his wife. The newly acquired property was named the Mountain Home Ranch and previously had an adobe house built in 1839 (still located at the intersection of present day Portola Road and La Honda Road) and a sawmill. In 1852 John Smith joined Charles Brown at the Searsville site, and the next year August Eikerenkotter arrived and started a store and hotel. By 1854 John Howell Sears moved to the site, for whom the town was named based on his postal contract.

Because of the Gold Rush, there was a strong demand for lumber in order to quickly build local towns. Searsville was a lumberjack settlement of a hundred or more people and the heart of a robust logging industry. This bustling town had the Eikerenkotter's Hotel, William Lloyd's blacksmith shop, post office, a school, saloons including Cutter’s Saloon, dwellings and a store called the Searsville Exchange. When the sawmills ran out of timber, the town died out. Because of the topography of Searsville being located in a floodplain, the town would never have survived long.

== Closure of the town ==
In 1887 the land, including the town, was sold to Spring Valley Water Works and they created the Searsville Dam, completed in 1892. There are conflicting stories on whether the existing Searsville buildings were all removed before the water filled the dam or not, or if the town's residents were vacated. The water in the dam had an issue with silt and was not drinkable, and starting in 1922 the lake was used as a local swimming hole.

For decades local families would swim and boat on the lake, but, in 1975, Stanford University closed the lake to the public when making it part of the Jasper Ridge Biological Preserve.

There are rumors of the "ghosts of Searsville” from the vanished town, living at the bottom of Searsville Lake.

== See also ==
- California Historical Landmarks in San Mateo County, California
- Searsville Dam
- Woodside, California
