= Alambique Creek =

River in San Mateo County, California, United States

- Location of the mouth in California
- Etymology: Spanish language

Location
- Country: United States
- State: California
- Region: Southeastern San Mateo County
- City: Woodside, California

Physical characteristics
- Source
  - location: Wunderlich County Park
  - coordinates: 37°24′06″N 122°14′38″W
  - elevation: 1,930 ft (590 m)
- Mouth: Sausal Creek
  - location: Middle Searsville Pond (Middle Searsville Marsh) just above Searsville Lake
  - coordinates: 37°24′12″N 122°14′52″W
  - elevation: 342 ft (104 m)

Alambique Creek, or Arroyo Alembique, is a 2.7-mile-long (4.3 km) stream located in San Mateo County, California, in the United States. It is a tributary to Corte Madera Creek and is part of the San Francisquito Creek watershed.

== History ==
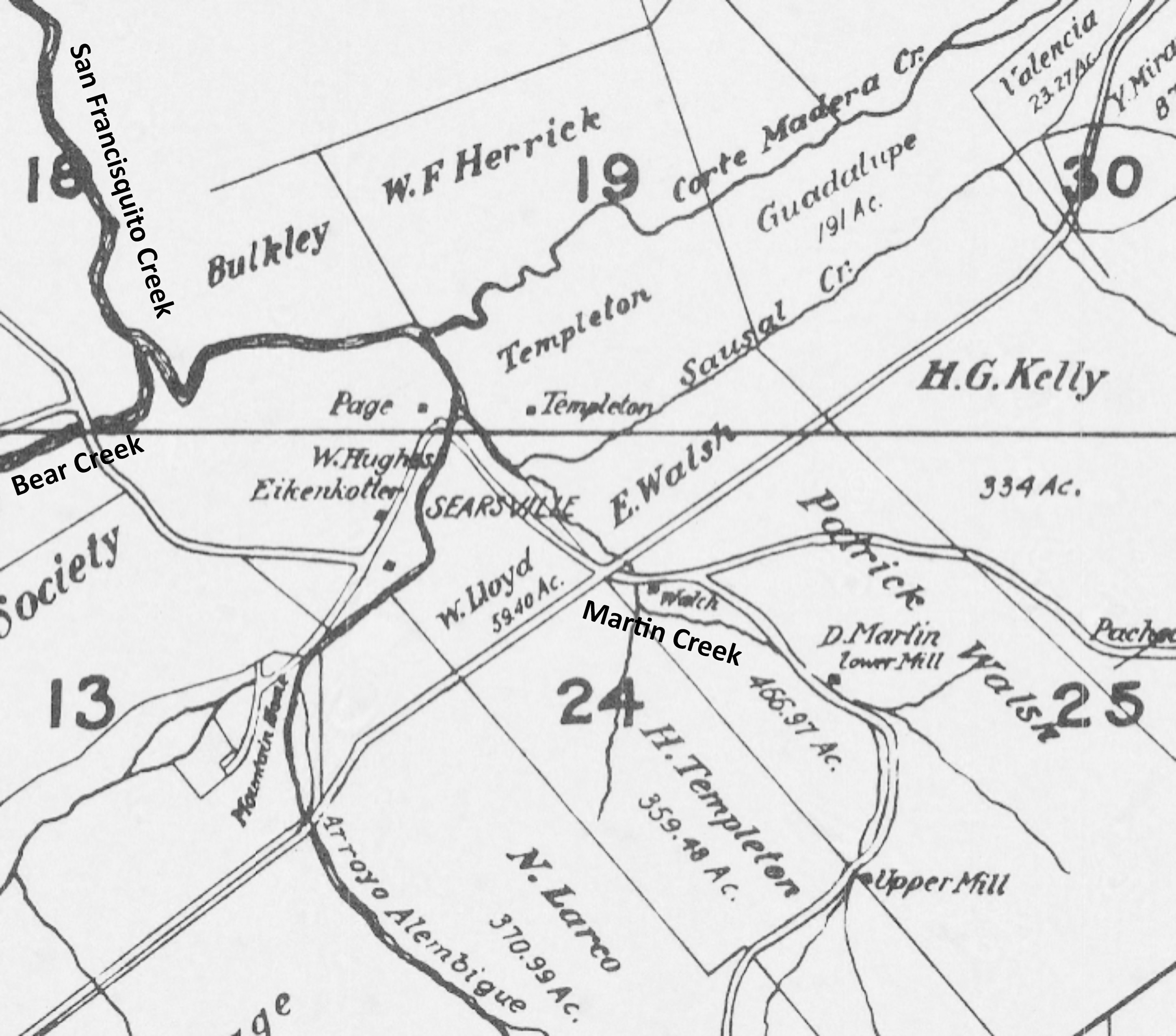
Snippet of Easton's 1868 Official San Mateo County Map showing the historical town of Searsville in between Alambique Creek (Arroyo Alembique) and Sausal Creek (and its Martin Creek tributary). Searsville was inundated by Searsville Dam and Reservoir in 1891. Modified to also show Bear Creek and San Francisquito Creek.

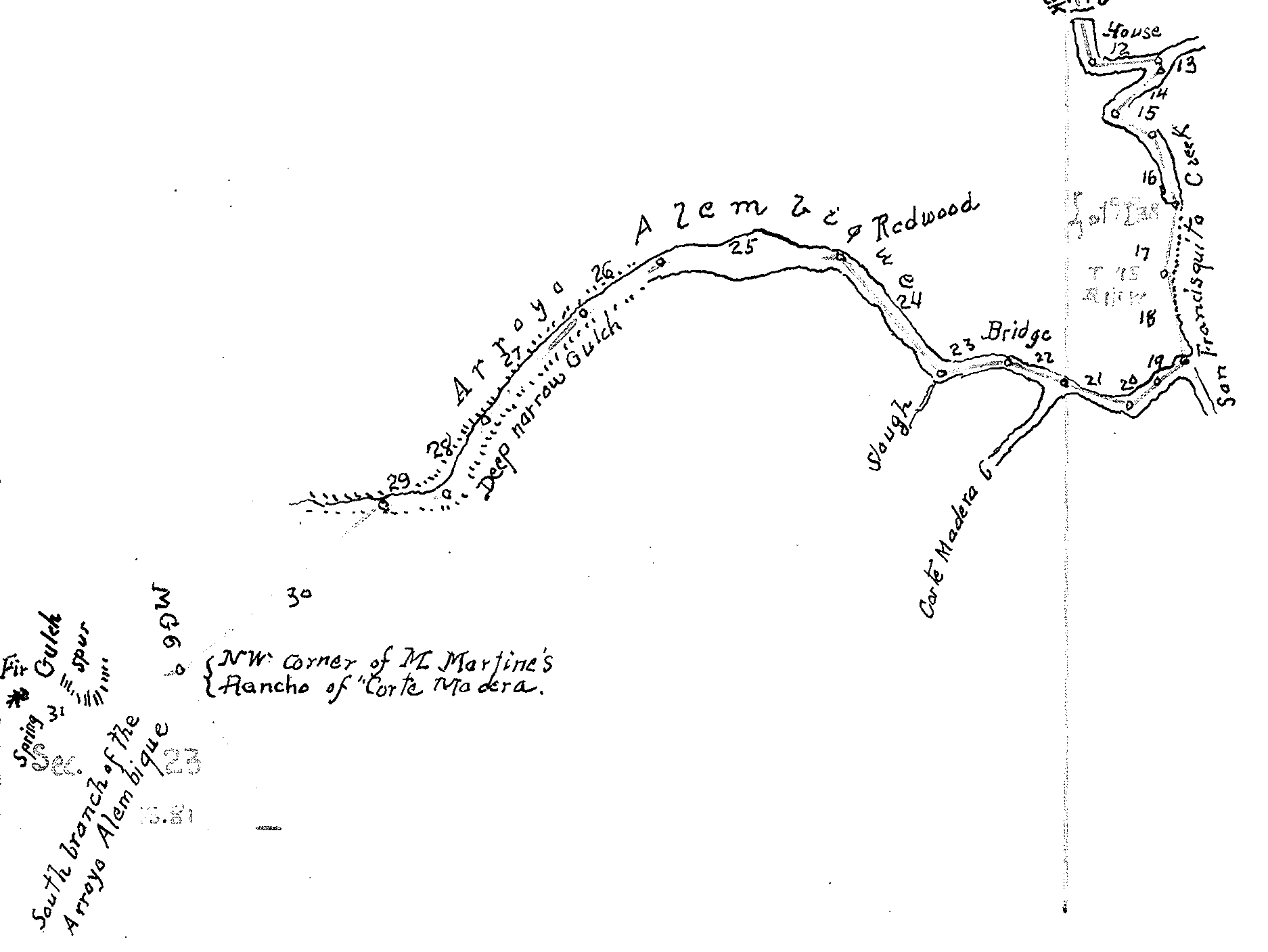
Detail from 1857 Plat of Rancho El Corte de Madera

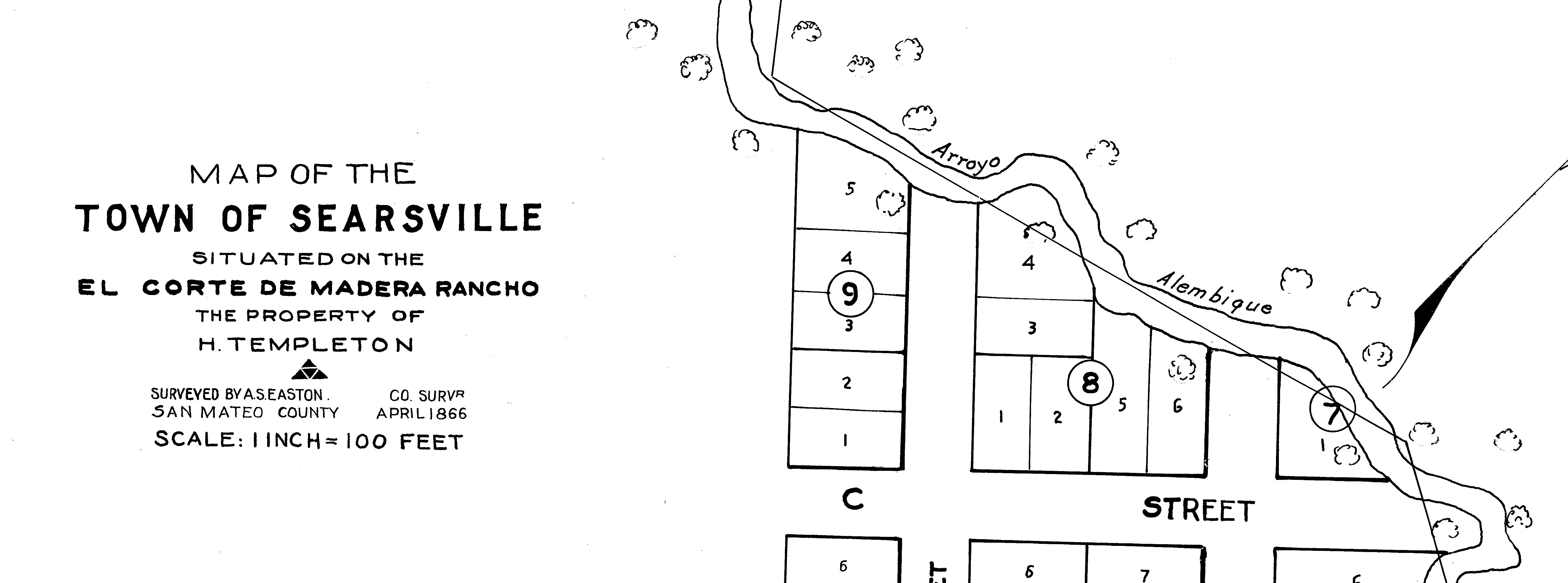
The creek flowed through the hamlet of Searsville

The creek's name is Spanish for "still," referring to a liquor distillery. Older Spanish spells it alembique with an "e". The English spelling is alembic, a type of still that is used today. The e spelling dominates in the 1800s and continued on most maps until the 1930s. The name refers to moonshiners Tom Bowen and Nicholas Dawson, English seaman deserters, who built an illegal still on the creek in 1842. The creek runs through Wunderlich Park in Woodside, California, where, in 1904, the creek was used by J. A. Folger for the first hydro-electrical power system in the region.

== Watershed ==
Alambique Creek begins below Skyline Boulevard on Bear Gulch Road near the intersection with Bear Glen Drive. After crossing La Honda Road, and just south of the intersection of Mountain Home Road and Portola Road, Alambique Creek enters Lloyd's Pond (Upper Searsville Pond) which is currently impounded by the road-fill of Portola Road and a culvert. Of note, Lloyd's Pond is likely named for William Lloyd (1823–1895), who operated a blacksmith shop in historic Searsville, and who partnered with other early pioneers Dr. Robert O. Tripp, James "Grizzly" Ryder, and Alvinza Hayward, a bullwhacker from Amador County, to harvest the redwoods. Next, Alambique Creek flows through a culvert under Portola Road into the Middle Searsville Pond (Middle Searsville Marsh) at its confluence with Sausal Creek.

== Ecology ==
Alambique Creek was once a historical steelhead trout (coastal rainbow trout) (Oncorhynchus mykiss irideus) spawning stream. In 1981, the creek was fish sampled and two stream resident rainbow trout which have been isolated from the Bay by Searsville Dam were collected where the creek crosses La Honda Road. In May 2002, the culvert beneath Highway 84 was identified as an impassable barrier to upstream migration.

== See also ==
- List of watercourses in the San Francisco Bay Area
