= Jasper Ridge Biological Preserve =

Nature reserve in Portola Valley, California, U.S.

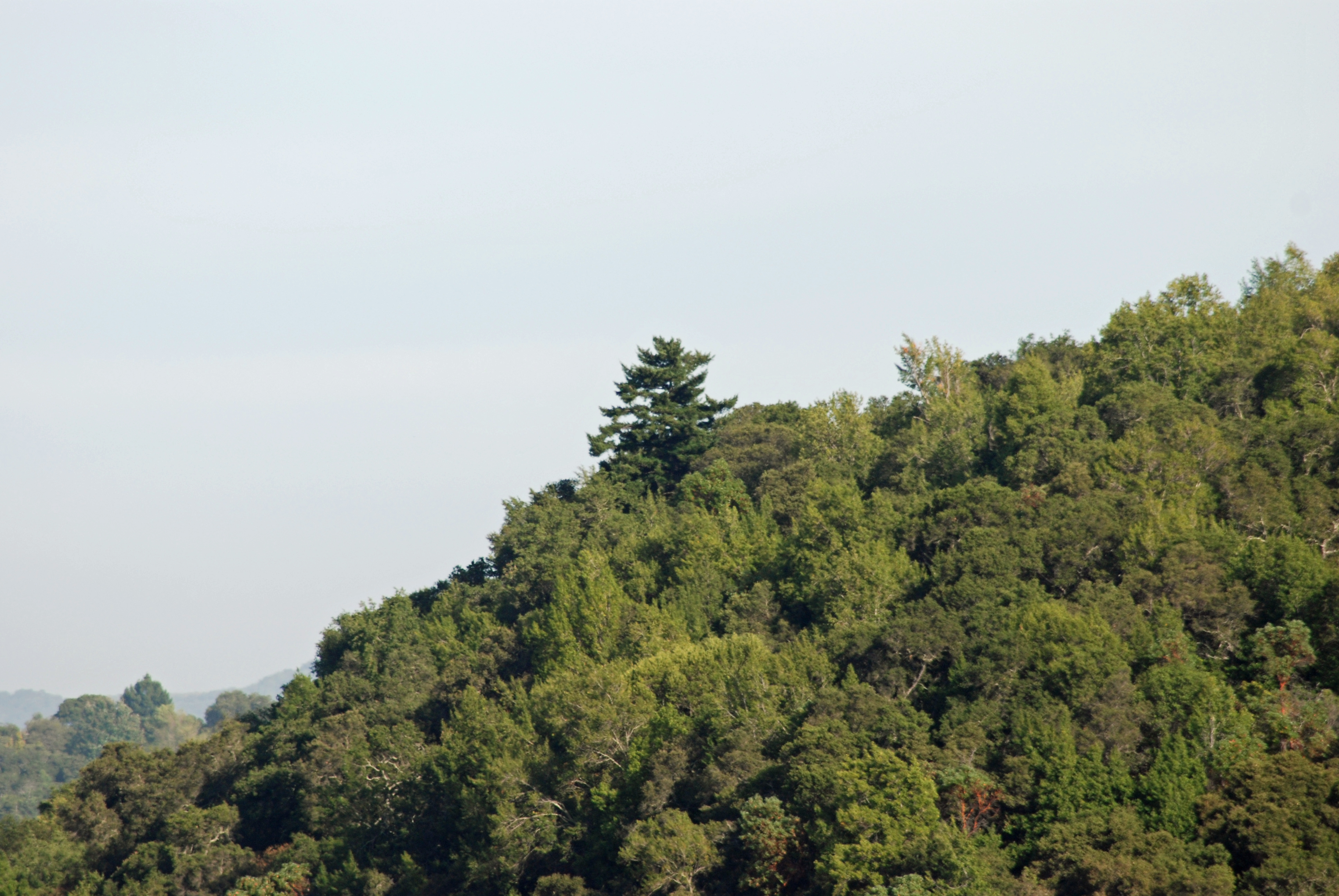
Douglas Fir rises above Coast Live Oak/Pacific Madrone forest on northeast peak of Jasper Ridge - viewed from Sandhill Road

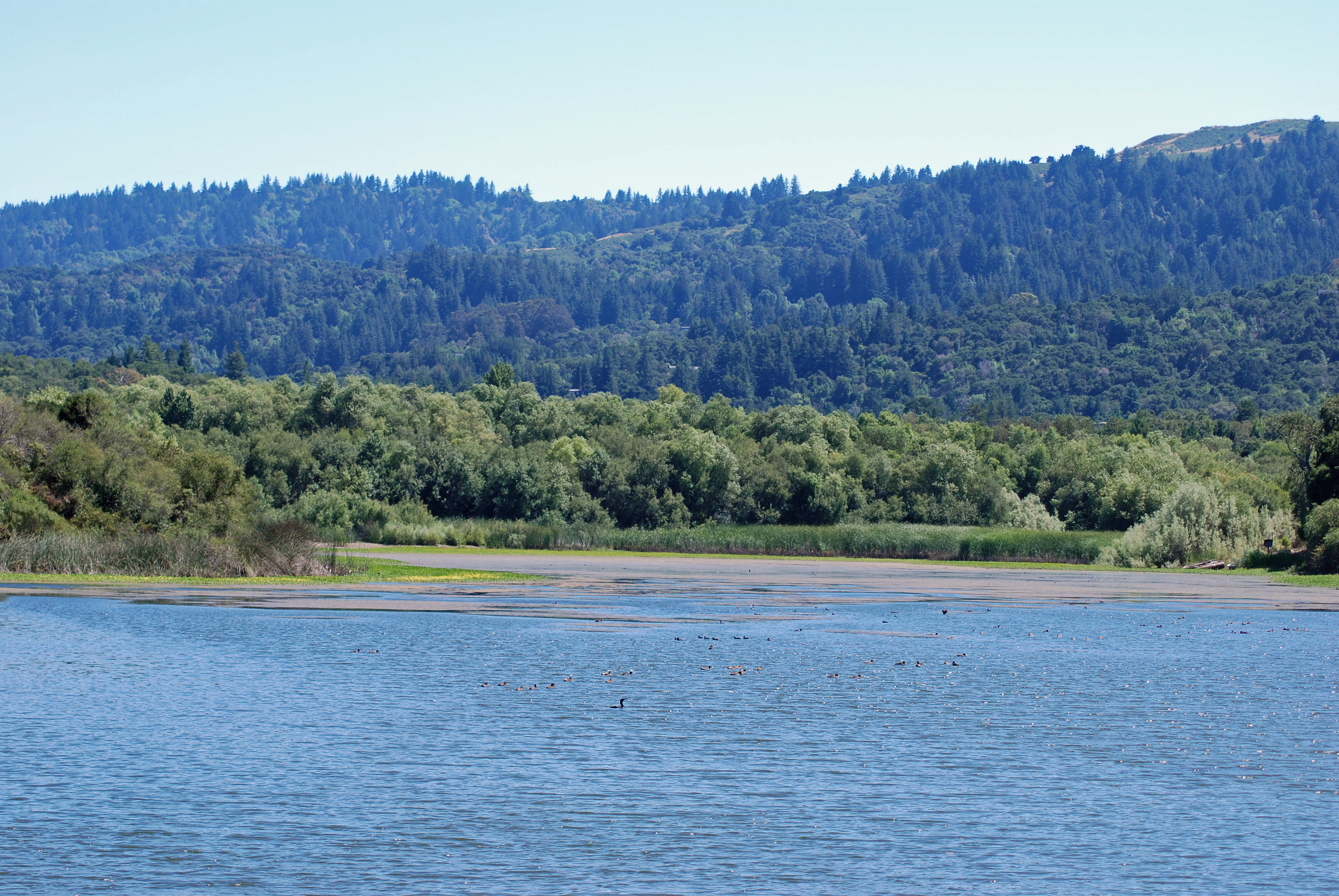
Looking south across Searsville Reservoir from the dam on Corte Madera Creek and on to Russian Ridge

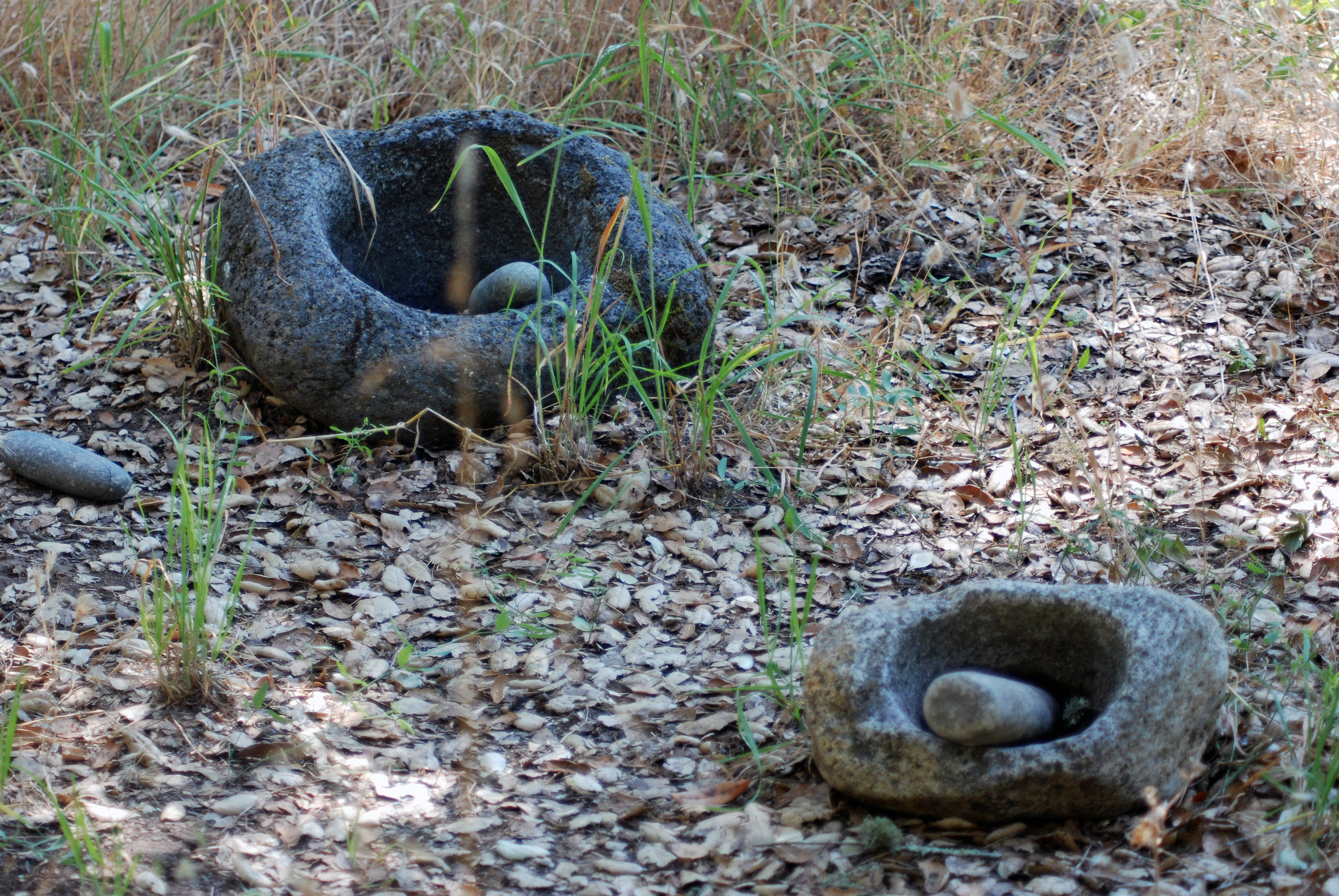
Ohlone mortars and pestles found at Jasper Ridge

The Jasper Ridge Biological Preserve is a 1,190 acres (483 ha) nature preserve and biological field station formally established as a reserve in 1973. The biological preserve is owned by Stanford University, and is part of the Stanford School of Humanities and Sciences. It is located at 37.408°N 122.2275°W south of Sand Hill Road and west of Interstate 280 in Portola Valley, San Mateo County, California. It is used by students, researchers, and docents to conduct biology research, and teach the community about the importance of that research. The preserve encompasses Jasper Ridge and Searsville Lake (actually a reservoir) and the upper reaches of San Francisquito Creek, along with the latter's Corte Madera Creek and Bear Creek tributaries.

== Geology ==
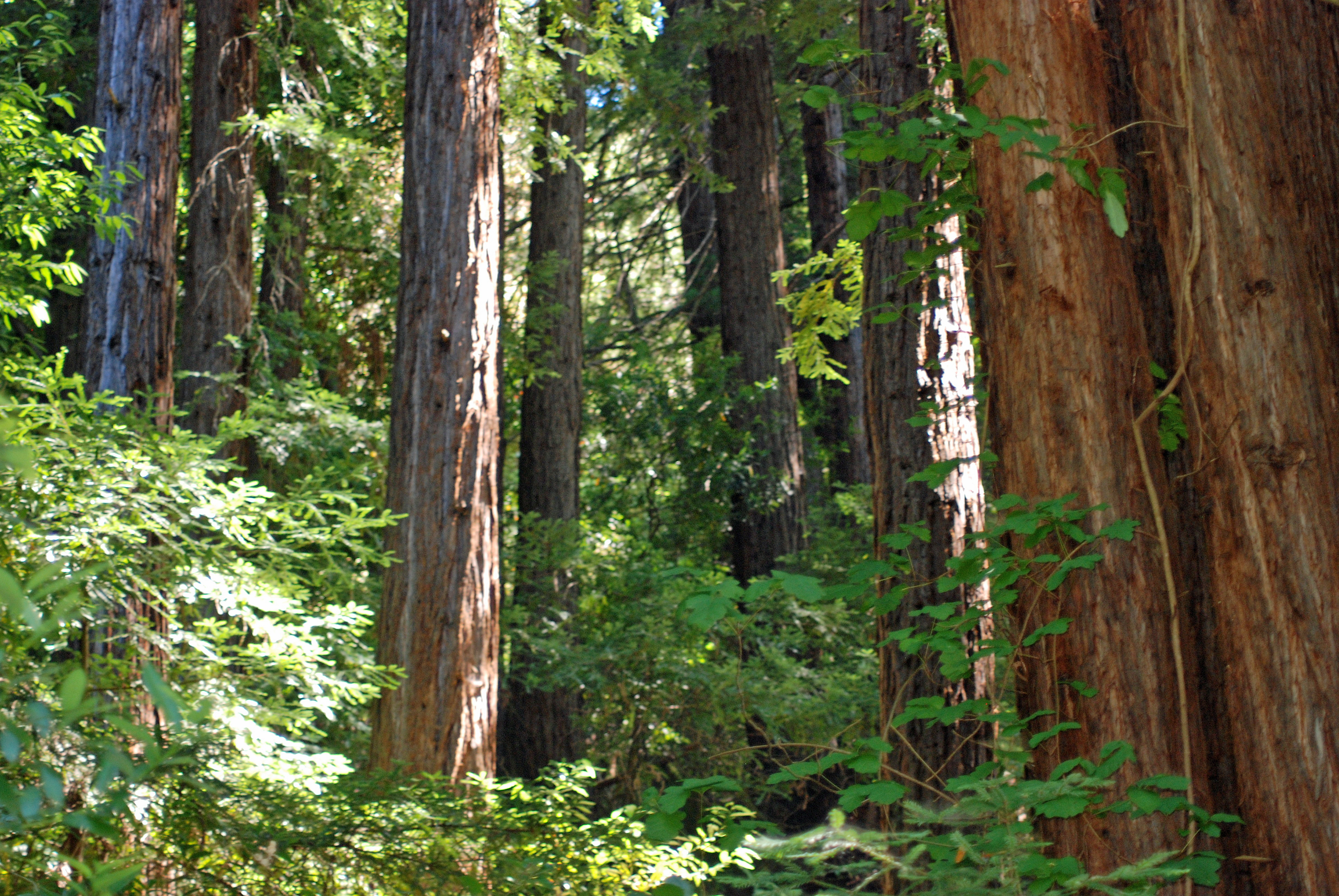
Coast Redwoods in San Francisquito Creek valley below Searsville Dam

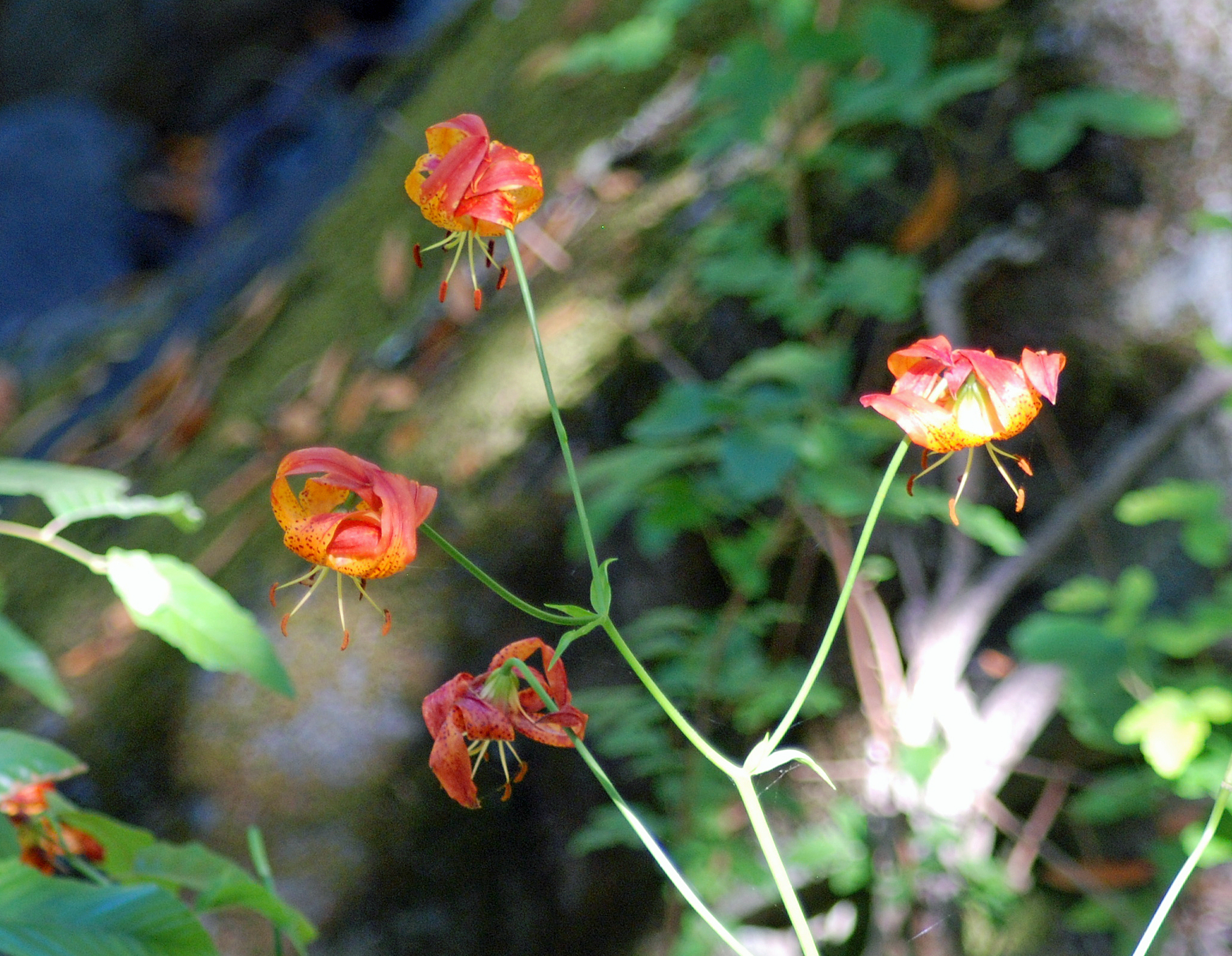
Columbia Tiger Lilies (Lilium columbianum) in San Francisquito Creek valley below Searsville Dam

Jasper Ridge is part of the foothills northeast of the Santa Cruz Mountains and is bounded by San Francisquito Creek, Corte Madera Creek and Los Trancos Creek, although the preserve occupies only the northwestern half of the ridge. The hilly mass runs about ten kilometers from northwest to southeast and about half that in width.

Serpentine (Serpentinite) is the California State Rock. It was formed from deep sea or mantle rocks. This rock was squeezed toward the surface by tectonic plate movement, and thus feels greasy, as it has been polished over millions of years. Graywacke Sandstone after crossing Leonard's Bridge. This sandstone was part of the Franciscan formation 138 million years ago. Some rocks found at the preserve include: Greenstone, Chert, Serpentinite, Sandstone.

== Ecology ==
In 1922, Cooper asserted that Jasper Ridge was historically chaparral, and cleared in the nineteenth century to open grasslands, primarily Eurasian wild oats (Avena fatua and Avena barbata). Much of the grassland has been replaced by various oaks, especially Coast Live Oak (Quercus agrifolia), and Pacific Madrone (Arbutus menziesii). More recently, the oak/madrone forest is being succeeded by specimens of large Douglas fir (Pseudotsuga menziesii) as in the image above. In addition there are several groves of second growth Coast Redwoods (Sequoia sempervirens) in the preserve, some in large "fairy rings" indicating that trees of immense girth were cut down in the nineteenth century.

== Academic studies ==
The Leslie Shao-ming Sun Field Station was built at Jasper Ridge in 2002. It is a 9,800 square feet (910 m^{2}) sustainable, energy efficient green building, with a solar heating system and a 22kW grid-connected photovoltaic system. It was the first green building built on campus and was designed for zero net carbon emissions. It is home to office space for staff, a laboratory for research, the Jean Lane Environmental Education Classrooms, a reference library, and the Oakmead Herbarium. Numerous academic studies and ecological experiments are conducted at Jasper Ridge.

=== Mountain lions ===
A 2026 study of the presence of mountain lions, which began in 2012, found evidence of trophic cascade.

=== Global change experiment ===
The Global Change Experiment studies the response of California annual grassland to global change, including elevated atmospheric CO_{2}, temperature, altered precipitation, and increased nitrogen deposition.

=== Argentine ant invasion ===
This project studies and tracks the Argentine ants, an invasive species.

=== Bat monitoring ===
A station near the lake monitors bats at night, by converting and recording bat sounds (ultrasonic echolocation).

== See also ==
- Organization of Biological Field Stations
