= Searsville Dam =

Dam in San Mateo County, California, US

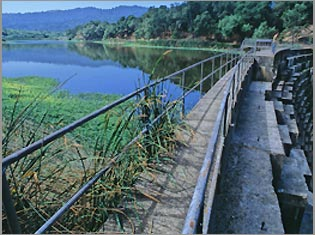
- Searsville Reservoir and dam around 2009 with heavy reservoir siltation visible

- Location within California
- Location: San Mateo County, California, US
- Coordinates: 37°24′25″N 122°14′16″W
- Construction began: 1890; 136 years ago
- Opening date: 1892; 134 years ago
- Owner: Stanford University

Dam and spillways
- Type of dam: Masonry
- Impounds: Corte Madera Creek in the San Francisquito Creek watershed
- Height: 65 ft (20 m)
- Width (base): 275 ft (84 m)
- Spillway type: Service, stepped

Reservoir
- Creates: Searsville Reservoir

Searsville Dam is a masonry dam in San Mateo County, California, that was completed in 1892, one year after the founding of Stanford University, and impounds Corte Madera Creek (in the San Francisquito Creek watershed) to form a reservoir known as Searsville Reservoir or Searsville Lake. Searsville Dam is located in the Jasper Ridge Biological Preserve and is owned and operated by Stanford University. Neighboring cities include Woodside and Portola Valley, California.

== History ==
The dam caused the partial inundation of the small and declining town of Searsville and the Searsville Hotel, which was founded by John H. Sears in 1854 to support the local logging industry. It was owned by the Spring Valley Water Company. In the 1906 San Francisco earthquake the dam suffered a "fingers-width" crack in the concrete at the east end; however, this was patched.

== Description ==
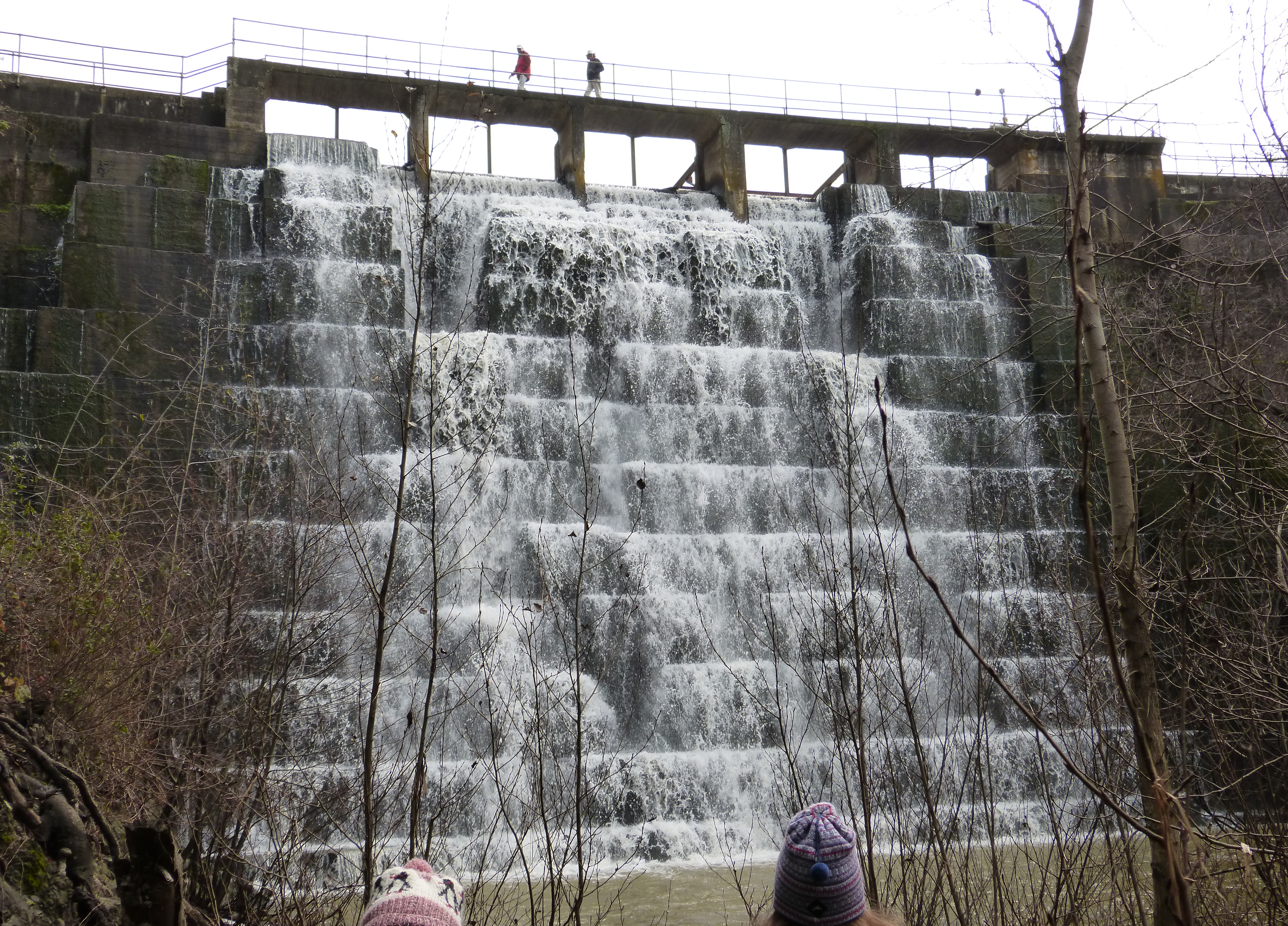
The front of the dam in 2013

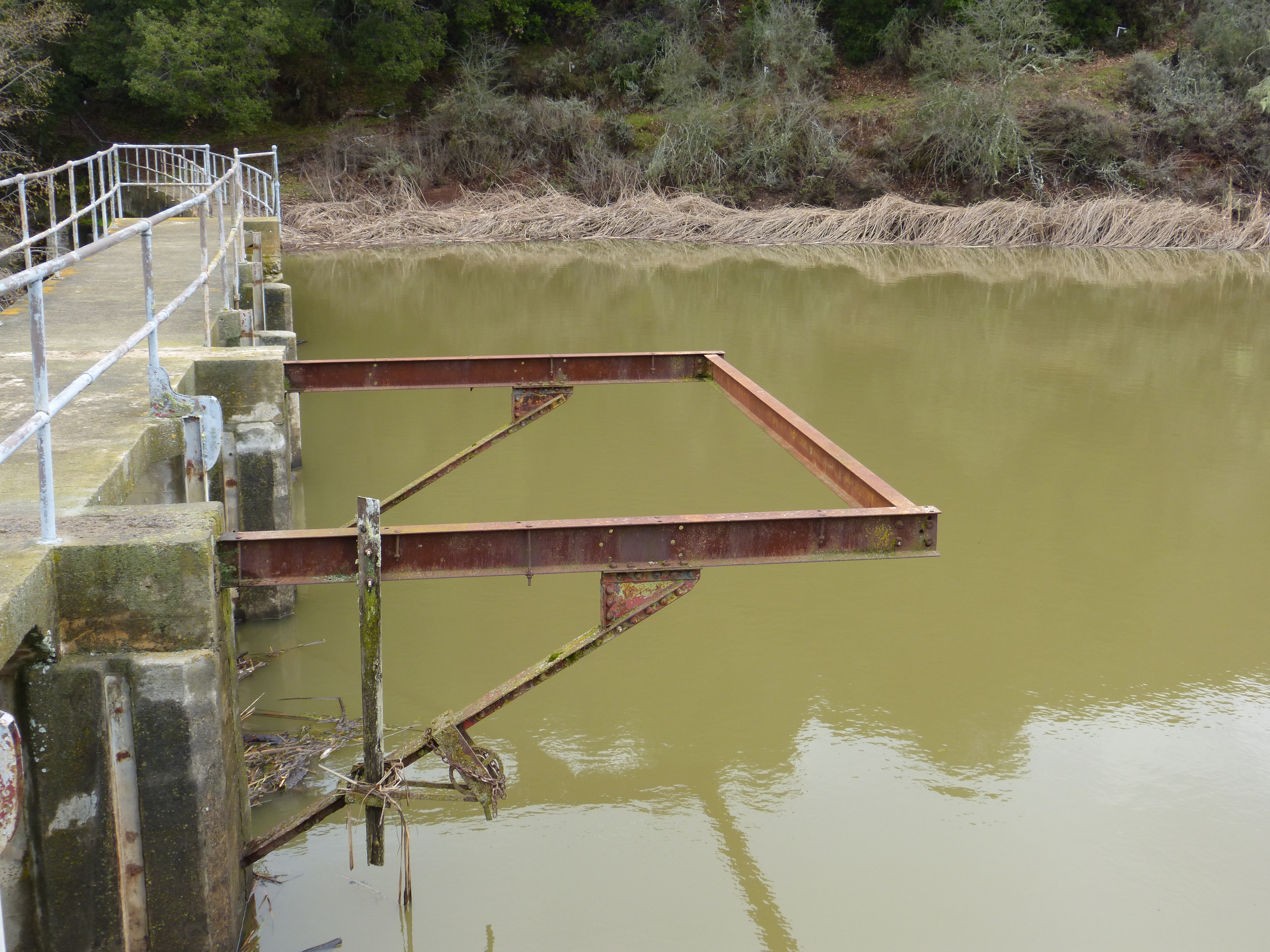
A frame on the dam which at one time supported a diving platform

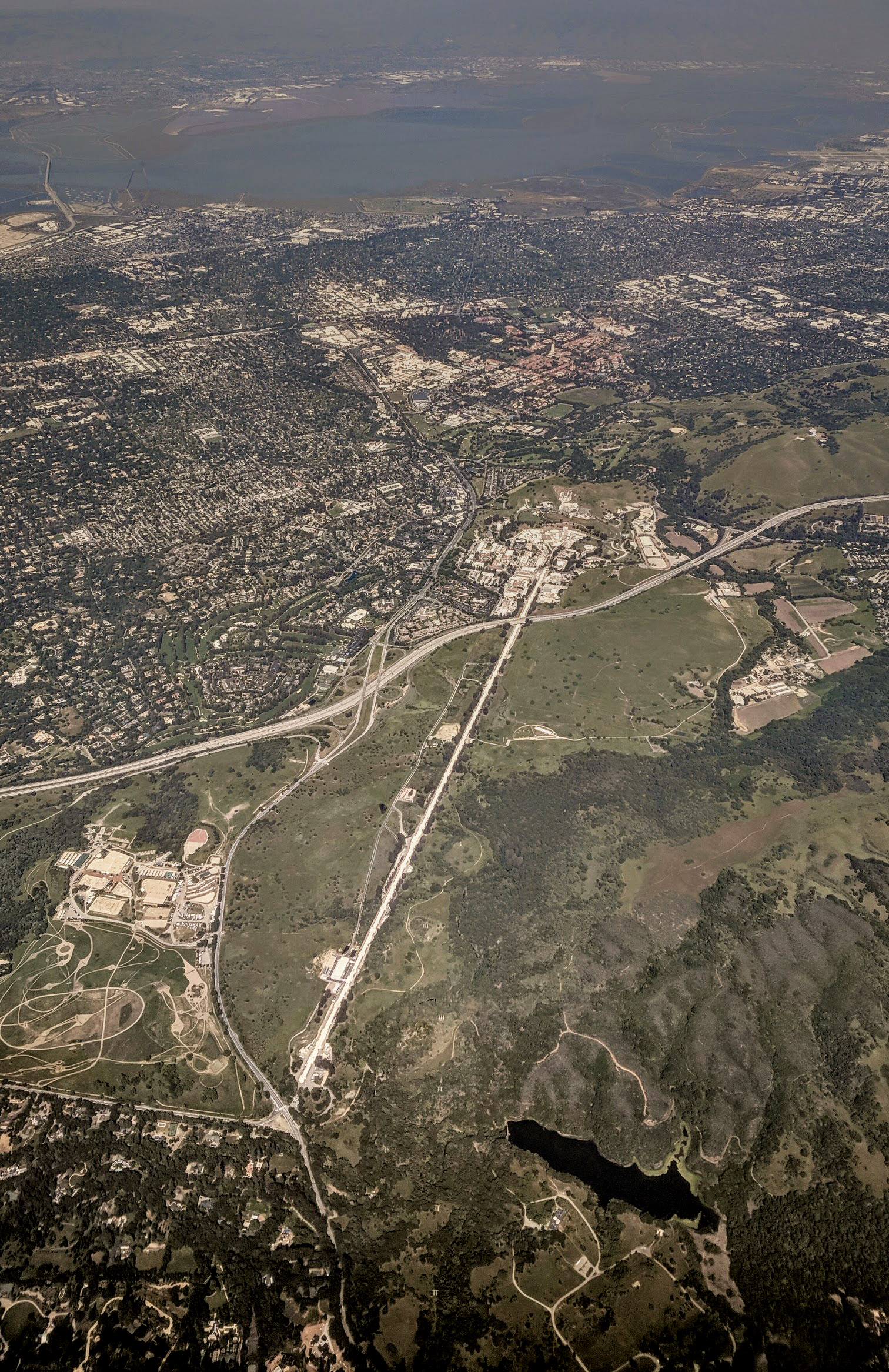
Aerial view of Searsville Reservoir with the Stanford Linear Accelerator Center and I-280, with San Francisco Bay in the distance

The 68-foot-tall (21 m) and 275-foot-wide (84 m) Searsville Dam consists of a series of interlocking concrete boulders that resemble a massively steep staircase. After leasing the reservoir for recreational use for 50 years, the Stanford Board of Trustees closed public access to Searsville Reservoir in 1975 in forming the Jasper Ridge Biological Preserve. The reservoir has lost over 90% of its original water storage capacity as roughly 2.7 million cubic yards of sediment has filled it in. Searsville Dam does not provide potable water, flood control, or hydropower. The elevation of the reservoir is 341 ft (104 m).

== Ecology ==
The dam poses an impassable barrier to migrating salmonids which is significant because the San Francisquito Creek watershed hosts the most viable remaining native steelhead trout (coastal rainbow trout) (Oncorhynchus mykiss irideus) population in the South San Francisco Bay. Although anadromous or seagoing steelhead trout still spawn below Searsville Dam, they can no longer run above Searsville Dam to spawn. Corte Madera Creek was described as an historic steelhead trout spawning stream by Skinner in 1962. However stream resident coastal rainbow trout, run up from Searsville Reservoir to spawn in upper Corte Madera Creek and its tributaries, enabling this native fish to survive above the dam as well. A May 2002 steelhead trout migration study reported Searsville Dam as the only complete barrier to migration on mainstem San Francisquito Creek (construction of a fishway in 1976 resolved passage at the Lake Lagunita diversion dam 3 miles below Searsville Dam, and the diversion dam was removed in 2019), and that elimination of the Searsville dam could restore ten miles of anadromous steelhead habitat.

The first President of Stanford University, David Starr Jordan, included a rendering of a San Francisquito Creek "sea-run rainbow trout", basically describing anadromous steelhead trout, in The Pacific Monthly in 1906. A genetics study of San Francisquito Creek steelhead in 1996 found that the fish are native and not of hatchery stock. In 2014 a systematic study of 1,400 plus dams in California identified Searsville Dam as a high-priority candidate to improve environmental flows for native fish conservation.

Several lines of evidence support the historical presence of coho salmon (Oncorhynchus kisutch) in San Francisquito Creek. Archaeological remains of unspecified salmonids ("possibly Coho") were reported by Gobalet in the creek. Leidy concluded that coho salmon were likely present and cited that the most suitable habitat for coho salmon was in perennial, well shaded reaches of mainstem San Francisquito Creek, and several small, perennial tributaries including Los Trancos, Corte Madera, Bear, and West Union creeks. In addition, three independent oral history sources indicate that coho salmon were abundant in the creek through the first half of the twentieth century. According to local historian Dorothy Regnery's notes from her 1966 interview with Edgar H. Batchelder, who was two years old when his father became caretaker of Searsville dam in 1897, "When the dam was 'wasting', or overflowing, in the winter salmon would swim upstream as far as the base of the dam. Using a pitchfork Mr. Batchelder could spear them to supplement the family's menu." His "favorite place to fish for trout was in the Dennis Martin Creek". A second source described catching "steelhead and silver (coho) salmon in San Francisquito Creek and the Guadalupe River System in the 1930s and 1940s. He said that the Guadalupe River also had runs of Chinook salmon (Oncorhyncus tshawytscha) that were very large in wet years." Thirdly, Dennis L. Bark, a senior fellow at the Hoover Institution, recalls playing on San Francisquito Creek around 1947: "Salmon swam up it, and in winter it was a dangerous place." The historical range of Coho salmon overlapped geographically with San Francisquito Creek. It is definitely established that Coho salmon were historically present in other San Francisco Bay streams such as San Mateo Creek and Alameda Creek. Also, the southern limit of Coho salmon in coastal California streams was recently confirmed to extend through Santa Cruz County based on both archaeological evidence and historically collected specimens.

In a 1996 biotic assessment of Searsville Reservoir and the lower floodplain of Corte Madera Creek, Stanford biologists wrote that the native species likely included coastal rainbow trout (Oncorhynchus mykiss irideus), sculpin, California roach (Hesperoleucas symmetricus), hitch (Lavinia exilcauda), speckled dace (Rhinichthys osculus), Sacramento sucker (Catostomus occidentalis), Pacific lamprey (Entosphenus tridentatus), and perhaps three-spined stickleback (Gasterosteus aculeatus), Sacramento pikeminnow (Ptychocheilus grandis), Sacramento blackfish (Orthodon microlepidontus), and coho salmon (Oncorhynchus kisutch). They noted that the only native species observed with any regularity in the study area are Sacramento sucker and rainbow trout, and attributed the now depauperate native fish fauna to dislocation of hydrologic connectivity due to the dam, transformation of the habitat above the dam from lotic to lentic, and the fact that Searsville Reservoir harbors many non-native species of centrarchid fishes (sunfish, black bass, and crappie) which prey on virtually all historically native fishes. They noted that federally threatened California red-legged frogs (Rana draytonii) occur in the lotic portions of Corte Madera Creek below the dam but not above, likely due to depredation by non-native fish and American bullfrogs (Lithobates catesbeianus).

The extent by which Searsville Reservoir serves as a source for non-native species was illustrated when Stanford biologists studied the aquatic fauna found in the plunge pool below the Searsville dam spillway. The plunge pool was drained in 2013 to allow for a safety inspection of the base of the dam. Native species found when the plunge pool was pumped dry include two steelhead trout, 26 California roach and 22 Sacramento suckers. In contrast, more than 1,500 non-native fishes were encountered during the dewatering process, including over 500 sunfish including green sunfish ((Lepomis cyanellus), bluegill (Lepomis macrochirus) and likely redear sunfish (Lepomis microlophus), two bullhead catfish (Ameiurus species) and over 1,000 mosquitofish (Gambusia affinis). Other non-native in the plunge pool included 500 bullfrogs and 150 Louisiana red swamp crayfish.

== Controversy ==
The future of the dam and reservoir is in question and has become politically heated. A 2007 study by the Jasper Ridge Advisory Committee describes five main options

1. Allow the reservoir to fill with sediments and transition to meadow habitat.
2. Remove the dam and restore Corte Madera Creek to steelhead trout habitat.
3. Alter the dam and dredge the reservoir to maintain open water in a smaller reservoir at lower water surface elevations.
4. Alter the dam to provide downstream flood mitigation.
5. Leave the dam but remove sediments to maintain open water.

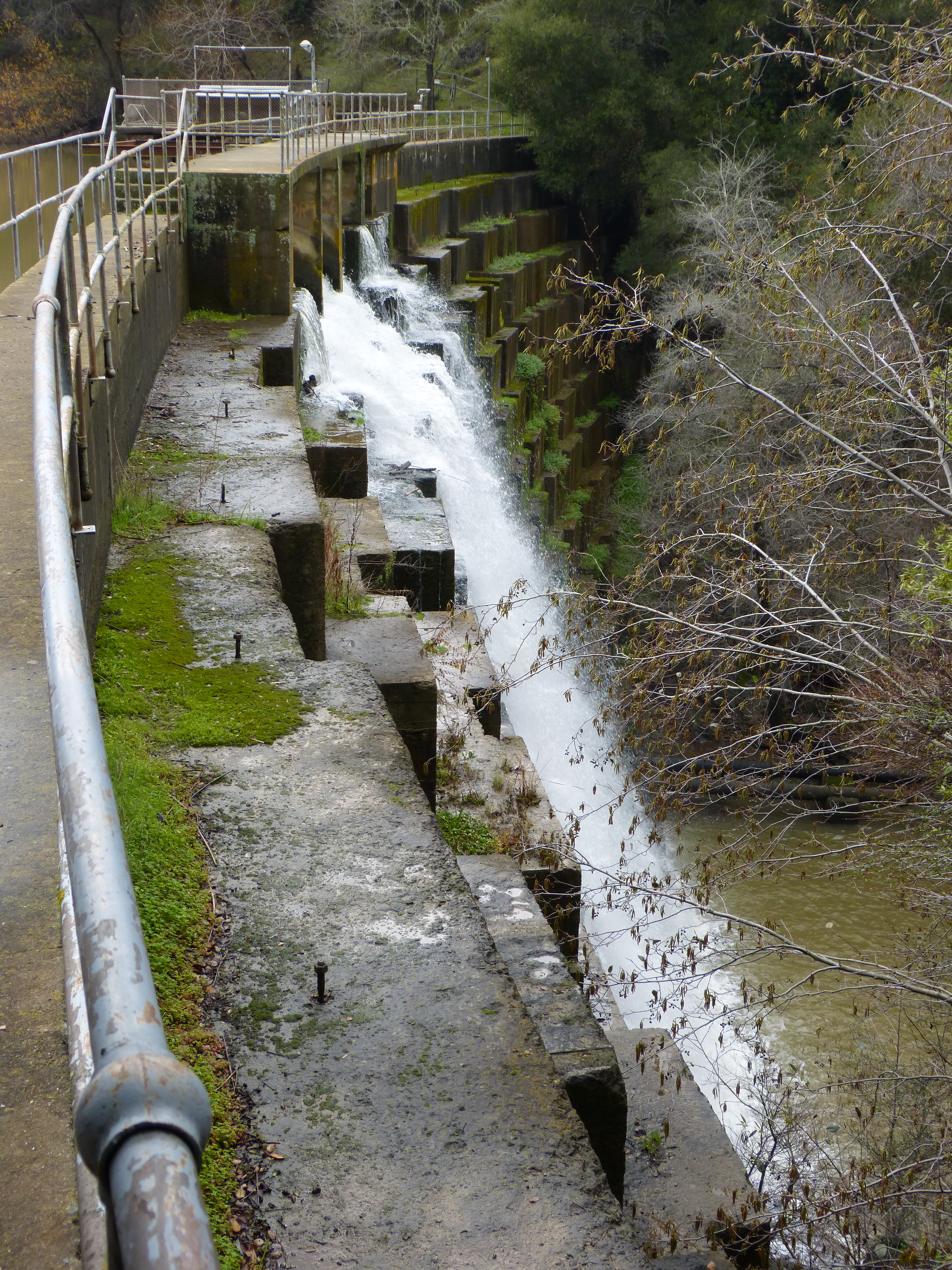
Looking across the top of the dam in 2013

The Center for Ecosystem Management and Restoration (CEMAR) has issued comments on Stanford University's April 2010 document, "Draft Environmental Impact Statement for Authorization for Incidental Take and Implementation of the Stanford University Habitat Conservation Plan" (HCP DEIS), finding that because the Searsville Dam project involves water diversion, bypass flows, and potentially major and ongoing dredging for 50 years, that the impacts of operating the diversion dam must be analyzed in the HCP EIS. CEMAR Certified Fisheries Professional, Gordon Becker, has requested that the impacts that the EIS should address include "blocking steelhead and other Covered Species access to habitat, altering downstream hydrology and water quality in San Francisquito Creek, introduction, perpetuation, and dispersal of exotic species, degrading downstream habitat, dewatering, and other direct and indirect take of Covered Species".

=== Pro-dam removal ===
A coalition of environmental and conservation groups, and fishermen, argue that the dam should be removed. In addition to concerns about access to upstream salmonid spawning grounds, Searsville Dam inundated former wetlands formed by the confluence of Corte Madera Creek, Sausal Creek, Dennis Martin Creek and Alambique Creek. These wetlands likely served a valuable historical function by removing sediment and pollutants from the San Francisquito Creek mainstem. Anti-dam proponents point to a growing trend in habitat restoration nationally with over 500 dams removed in recent years.

=== Anti-dam removal ===
The Jasper Ridge Advisory Committee feels that dam removal has many drawbacks. There is no guarantee that removing the dam would restore steelhead habitat and it would destroy habitat used by many birds and bats. In addition the removal of the dam and accumulated alluvial sediment would be complex especially given the downstream communities and environment. Stanford University uses water from the reservoir to irrigate its golf course and other athletic facilities on its campus.

=== Possible site of Anthropocene boundary marker ===
The dam and reservoir may be selected as the site of a marker indicating the boundary between Geologic Areas. In this case, the boundary between the Holocene and the current Anthropocene, or the time when human change on geology became so evident that it required its own geologic era. The Anthropocene Working Group (AWG), a task group of the Sub-commission on Quaternary Stratigraphy (SQS) of the International Commission on Stratigraphy (ICS) has selected Searsville dam and reservoir as a possible location of a golden spike indicating a Global Boundary Stratotype Section and Point, or GSSP. In May 2019, the AWG agreed to listing the Anthropocene as a "formal chrono-stratigraphic unit": that is, an official part of the geographic record. They recognized the start of the Anthropocene as the middle of the 20th Century. These GSSPs are markers that define the boundaries of geologic stages. They are noted in specific locations around the world by "golden spikes", which note which geologic era the site emerged.

== See also ==
- List of dams and reservoirs in California
- List of lakes in California
- San Francisquito Creek
- San Mateo Creek
