= Union Cemetery (Redwood City, California) =

- U.S. National Register of Historic Places
- California Historical Landmark
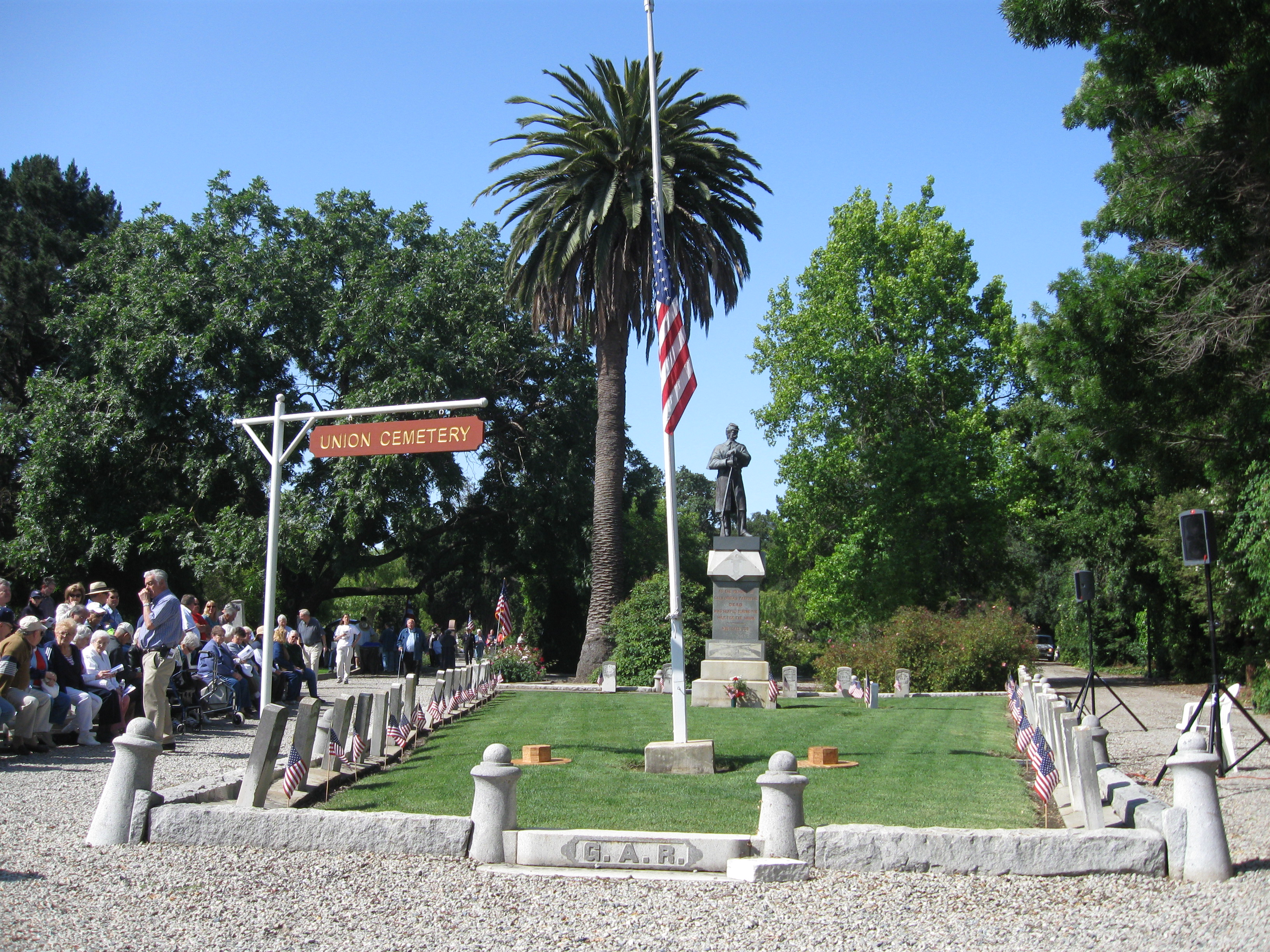
- Memorial Day ceremonies at the Civil War memorial.

- Location within San Francisco Bay Area Location within California Location within the United States
- Location: 316 Woodside Rd., Redwood City, California
- Coordinates: 37°28′26″N 122°13′24″W
- Area: 6.5 acres (2.6 ha)
- Built: 1859; 167 years ago
- NRHP reference No.: 83001237
- CHISL No.: 816

Significant dates
- Added to NRHP: August 25, 1983
- Designated CHISL: 1967

Union Cemetery is a historic cemetery on Woodside Road (CA 84) near El Camino Real in Redwood City, San Mateo County, California. The cemetery was named a California Historical Landmark #816 in 1967, then added to the National Register of Historic Places in 1983.

== History ==
Founded in 1859, this is the site of the first American burial ground in San Mateo County, and was originally located just outside the town limits of Redwood City. The cemetery officially closed in 1918, but it was used for many years after that for burial of the poor. There are special cemetery plots for the Masonic Order, members of the International Order of Odd Fellows and the California volunteers who fought during the Civil War.

=== Soldier statue ===
The life-sized metal sculpture of a civil war veteran was erected during 1889 for a Memorial Day celebration, the earliest such celebration on the Peninsula. The statue was paid for by Jane Lathrop Stanford. It was vandalized in 1958, 1959 and 1969, but was subsequently repaired, and in 1999 it was replaced with a replica constructed of more durable material.

== Notable graves ==
- Lester Phillip Cooley (1837–1882) was an early pioneer of East Palo Alto and Cooley Landing.
- John Howell Sears (1823–1907) was an early pioneer of Searsville and La Honda.
- Sarah Wallis (1825–1905) was an early Anglophone settler in California and first President of the California Woman Suffrage Educational Association.

== Gallery ==
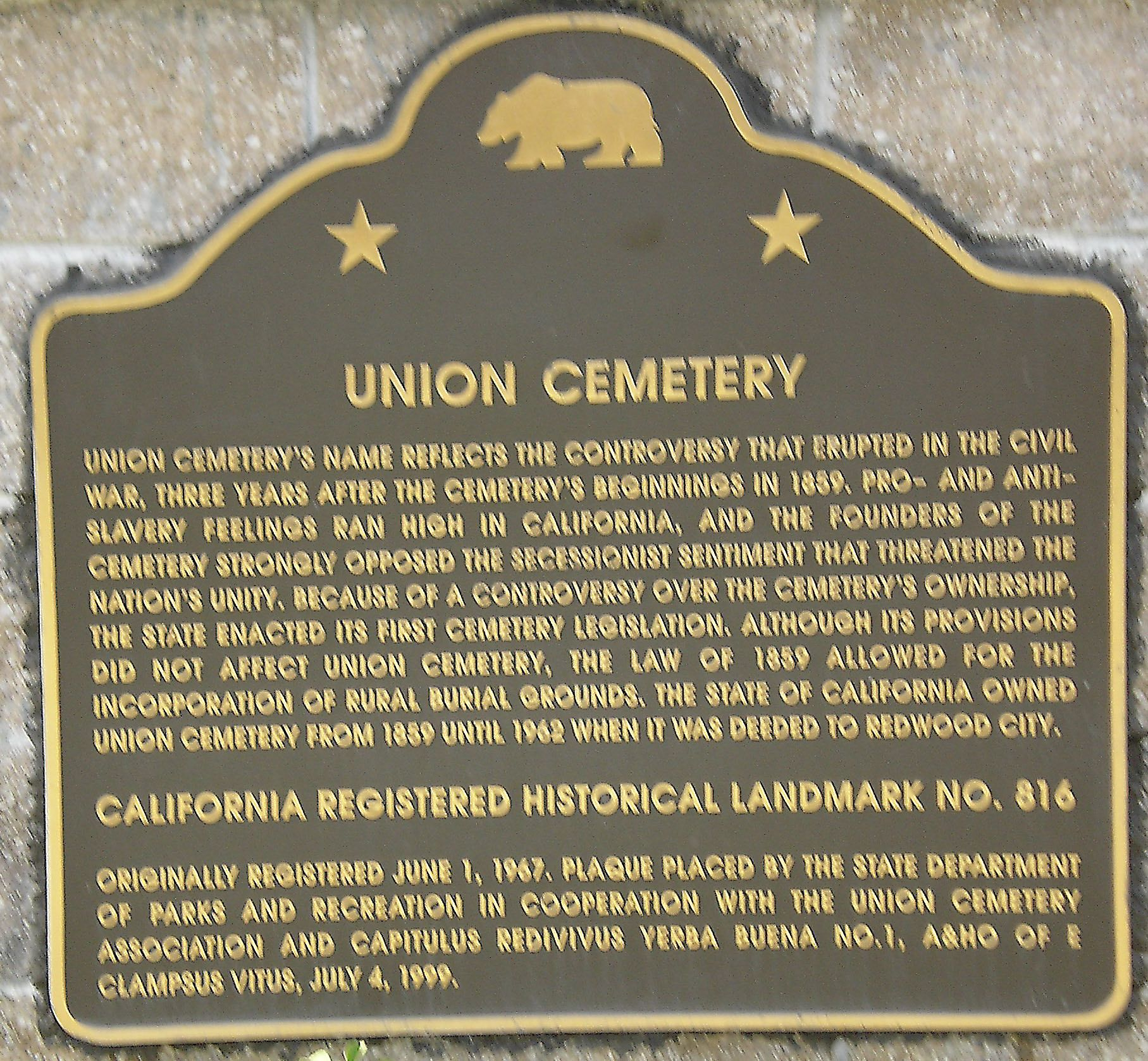
Historic marker

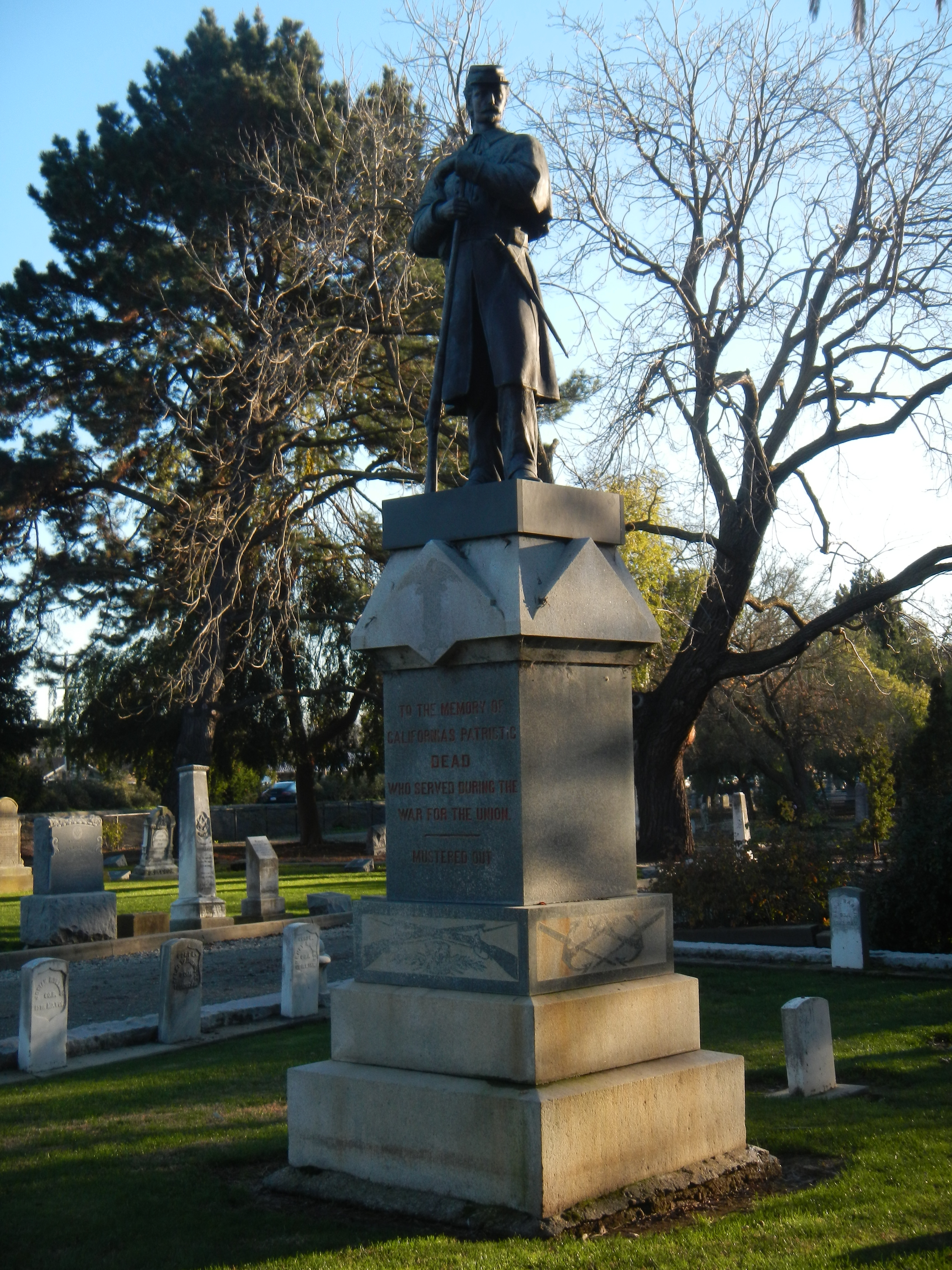
Memorial statue

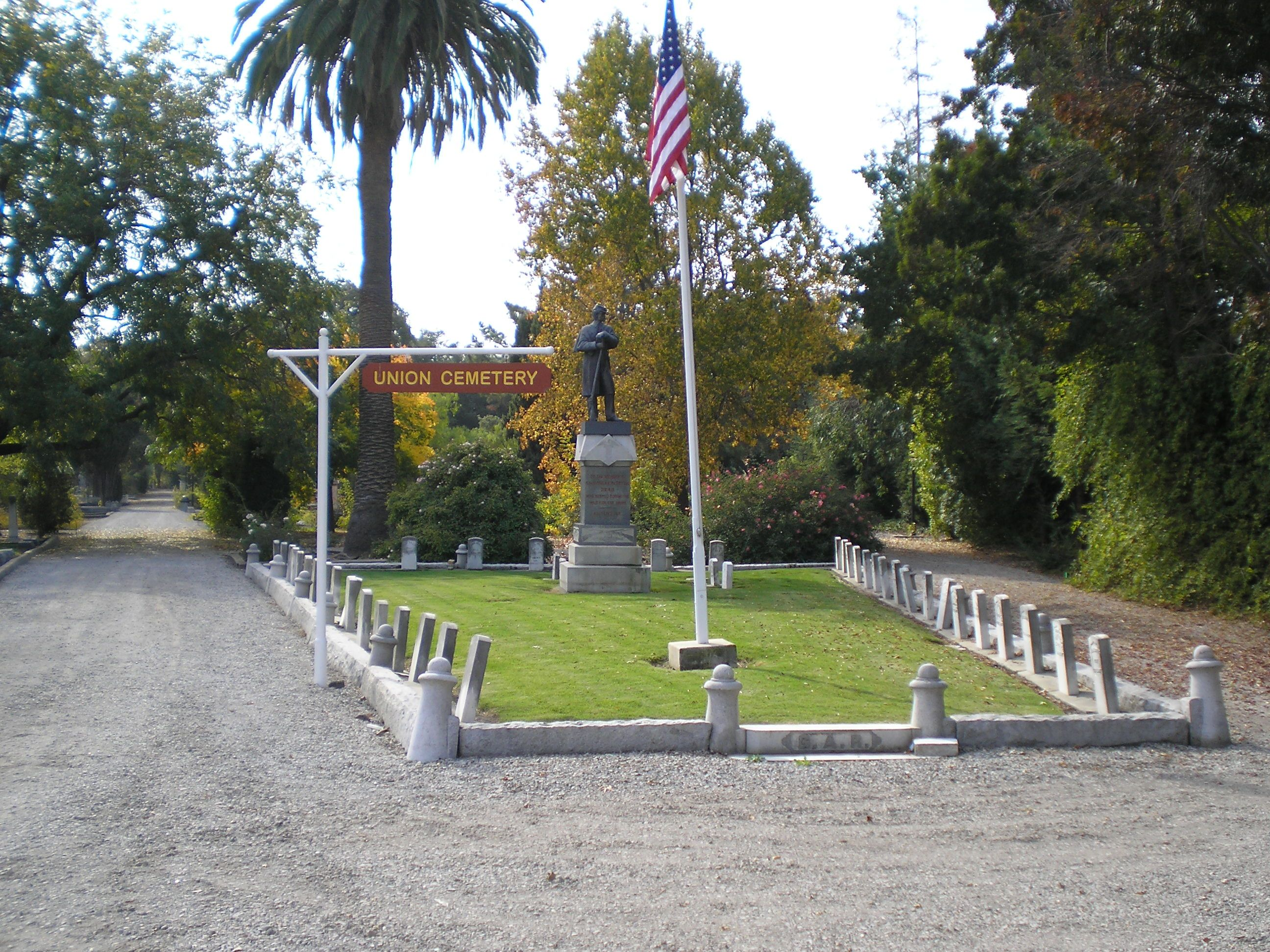
Grand Army of the Republic memorial

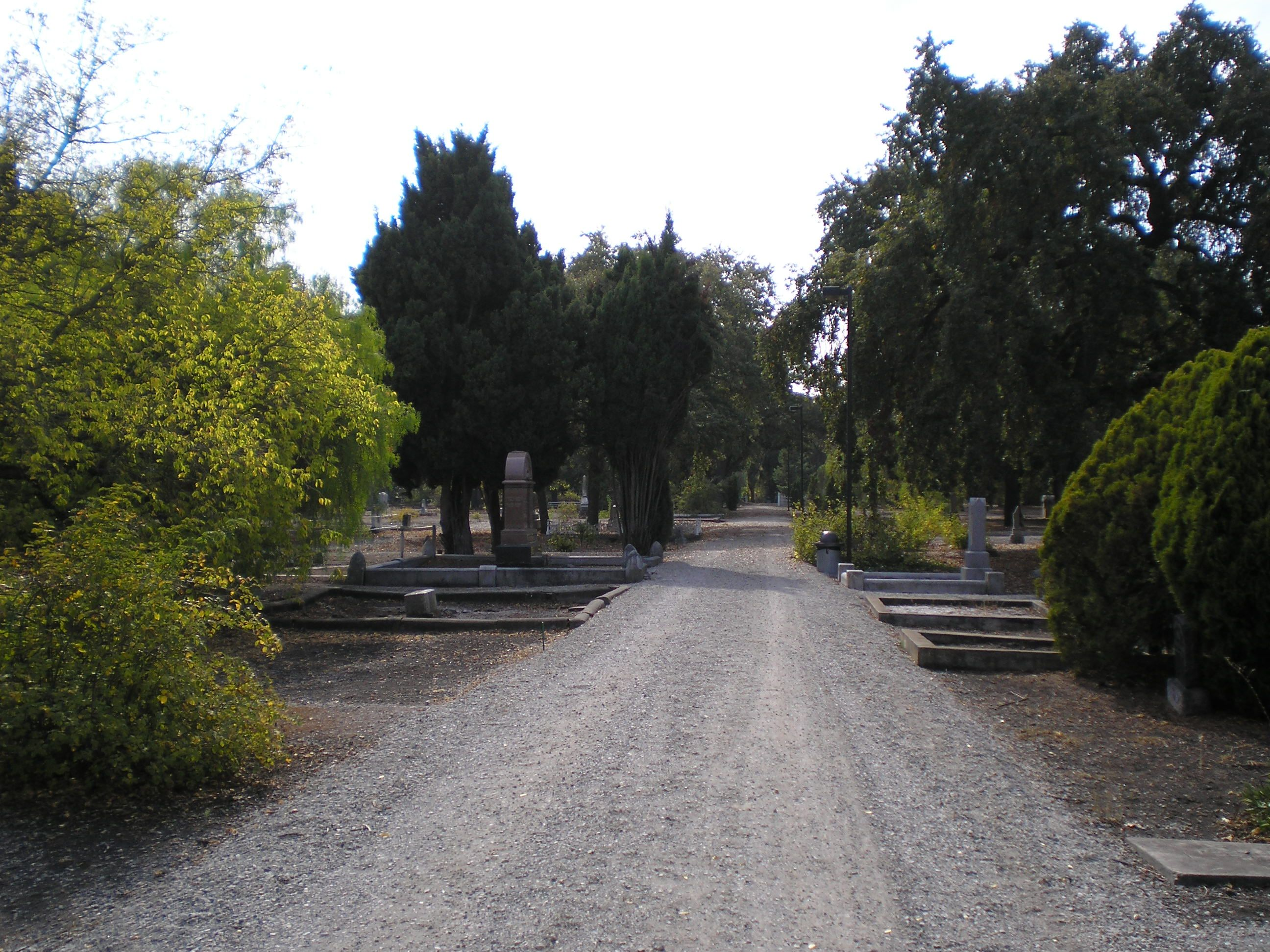
View west

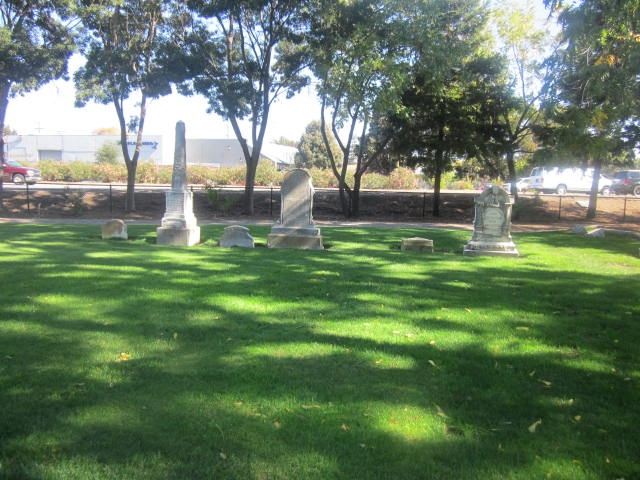
Headstones at cemetery

== See also ==
- California Historical Landmarks in San Mateo County, California
- National Register of Historic Places listings in San Mateo County, California
- Pioneer cemetery
- San Mateo County History Museum
- Union (American Civil War)
