= Old Store at La Honda =

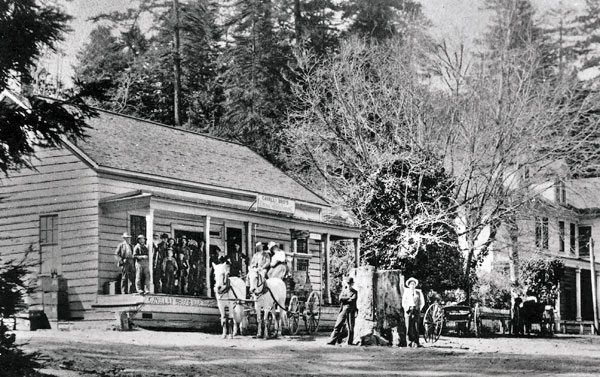
- Old Store at La Honda

- Location within California Location within the United States
- 37°19′10.9″N 122°16′28.8″W
- Location: 8865 La Honda Road, La Honda, San Mateo County, California

History
- Built: between 1862–1870
- Built for: John L. Sears

Site notes
- Governing body: California State Parks

California Historical Landmark
- Designated: 1939
- Reference no.: 343

Old Store at La Honda sat at the Northwest corner of CA Highway 84 at La Honda Road and Sears Ranch Road, this location is now listed as 8865 La Honda Road, La Honda, San Mateo County, California. This is a California Historical Landmarks in San Mateo County since 1939. A store is open and functions as a neighborhood market at this location, under a different name and ownership and nothing is left of the original store.

== History ==
When John Howell Sears had to leave Searsville because of the decline of the lumber industry in that area, he settled in the La Honda area in 1862, bought 400 acres of land, and built a store. The exact date of the building of the store is unknown but estimated between the 1860s to 1870s.

The store was nicknamed the "Bandit-Built Store" because it's rumored that Jim, Cole and Bob Younger (of the bank robbing James–Younger Gang) helped build the store and worked there too, while hiding out in La Honda and pretending to be lumberjacks. However in Bob Dougherty's 2007 book named La Honda, "...the story of the 'bandit built' Sears store is improbable because the Younger brothers were already in prison in the summer of 1876 for the Northfield Bank robbery before the store was built the following year."

== See also ==
- California Historical Landmarks in San Mateo County, California
