= Woodside Elementary School District =

School district in California, United States

Address
- 3195 Woodside Road Woodside, California, 94062; United States

District information
- Type: Public
- Grades: K–8
- NCES District ID: 0643140

Students and staff
- Students: 369 (2020–2021)
- Teachers: 33.1 (FTE)
- Staff: 30.28 (FTE)
- Student–teacher ratio: 11.15:1

Other information
- Website: www.woodsideschool.us

The Woodside Elementary School District is a single school K-8 public school district in the San Francisco Bay Area, serving incorporated Woodside. Students from this school district who continue on with public schooling matriculate to the Sequoia Union High School District.

It has Woodside Preschool, located on the elementary school campus; Woodside Elementary School (TK-5), which has about 300 students; and Woodside Middle School.
