= Woodside Store =

- U.S. National Register of Historic Places
- California Historical Landmark
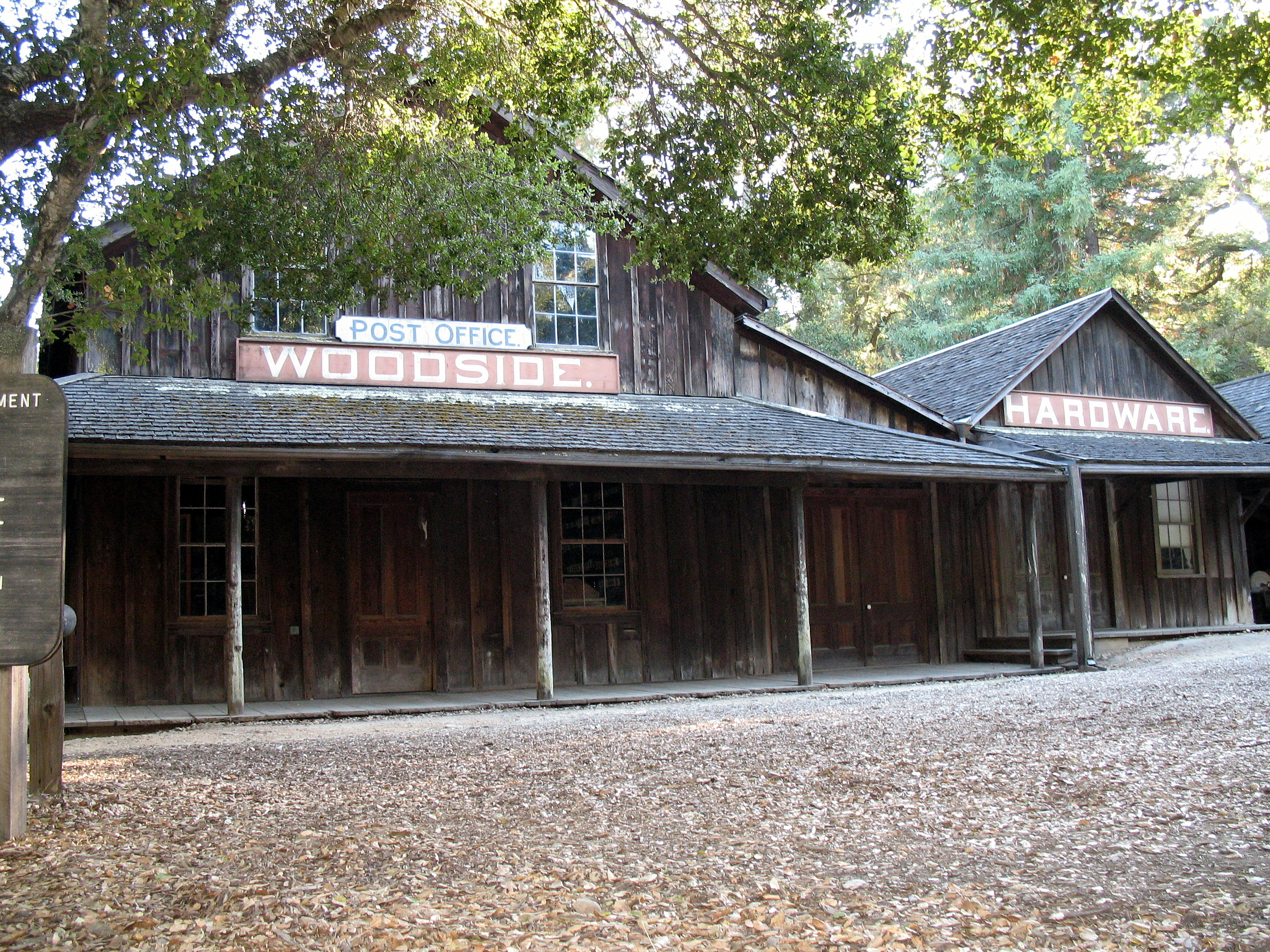

- Location within San Francisco Bay Area Location within California Location within the United States
- Location: 3300 Tripp Road, Woodside, California
- Coordinates: 37°25′50″N 122°16′38″W
- Area: 1.2 acres (0.49 ha)
- Built: 1854; 172 years ago
- Architects: Dr. Robert Orville Tripp, Mathias A. Parkhurst
- NRHP reference No.: 85001563
- CHISL No.: 93

Significant dates
- Added to NRHP: July 18, 1985
- Designated CHISL: March 29, 1993

The Woodside Store also called Tripp Store, sits at 3300 Tripp Road at Kings Mountain Road, Woodside, San Mateo County, California. This building has been listed on the National Register of Historic Places since 1985 and is listed as a California Historical Landmark in San Mateo County since 1949. It was preserved through the efforts of the San Mateo Historical Association in the 1940s. After being taken under the wing of the Association in 1979, it was subject to a substantial restoration during the mid-1980s, which was completed by 1994.

== History ==
The current Woodside Store was constructed in 1854 (after the 1851 version burned down) by two early pioneers named Robert Orville "Doc" Tripp and Mathias Parkhurst. Tripp was a dentist from Massachusetts that came to California during the Gold Rush. This redwood emporium sat in the middle of the San Francisco Peninsula's lumbering district; it was, for a time, the only general store and stagecoach stop between San Francisco and Santa Clara. The store sold everything from food to construction supplies and also served as a post office, bank, saloon and dentist office. After Parkhurst's death in 1863, the store was operated by Tripp until his death in 1909, at the age of 93.

Legend has it that Tripp had a very large dog that would follow him and they are photographed together. It has been rumored that there is a ghost of his dog, haunting the Woodside Store.

The store was acquired by the County in 1940, and opened in 1947 as a museum.

== Museum ==
Tours of the museum are arranged through the Woodside Store School Program and non-school groups can call the museum to schedule a tour.

The museum of the Woodside Store has been restored to its 1880s appearance, and you can see the types of goods available in that time period – "from canned fruit and frying pans to nails and sewing machines."

== Gallery ==
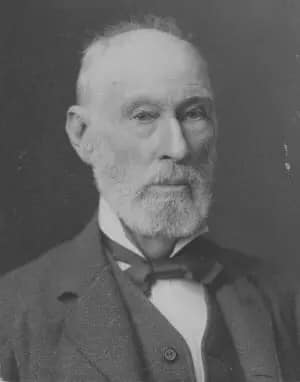
Robert Orville Tripp

Exterior of the Woodside Store with State of California plaque

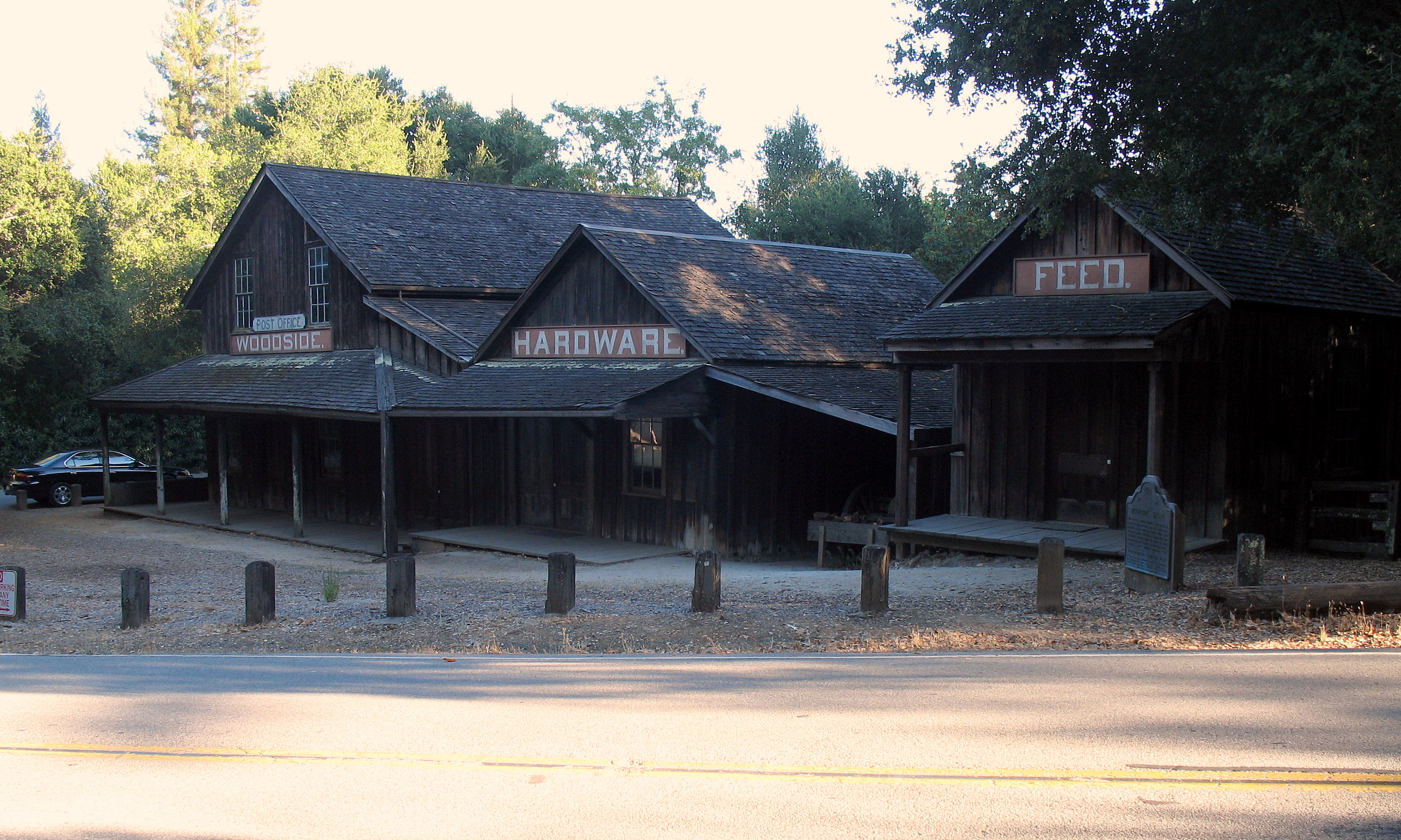
Exterior

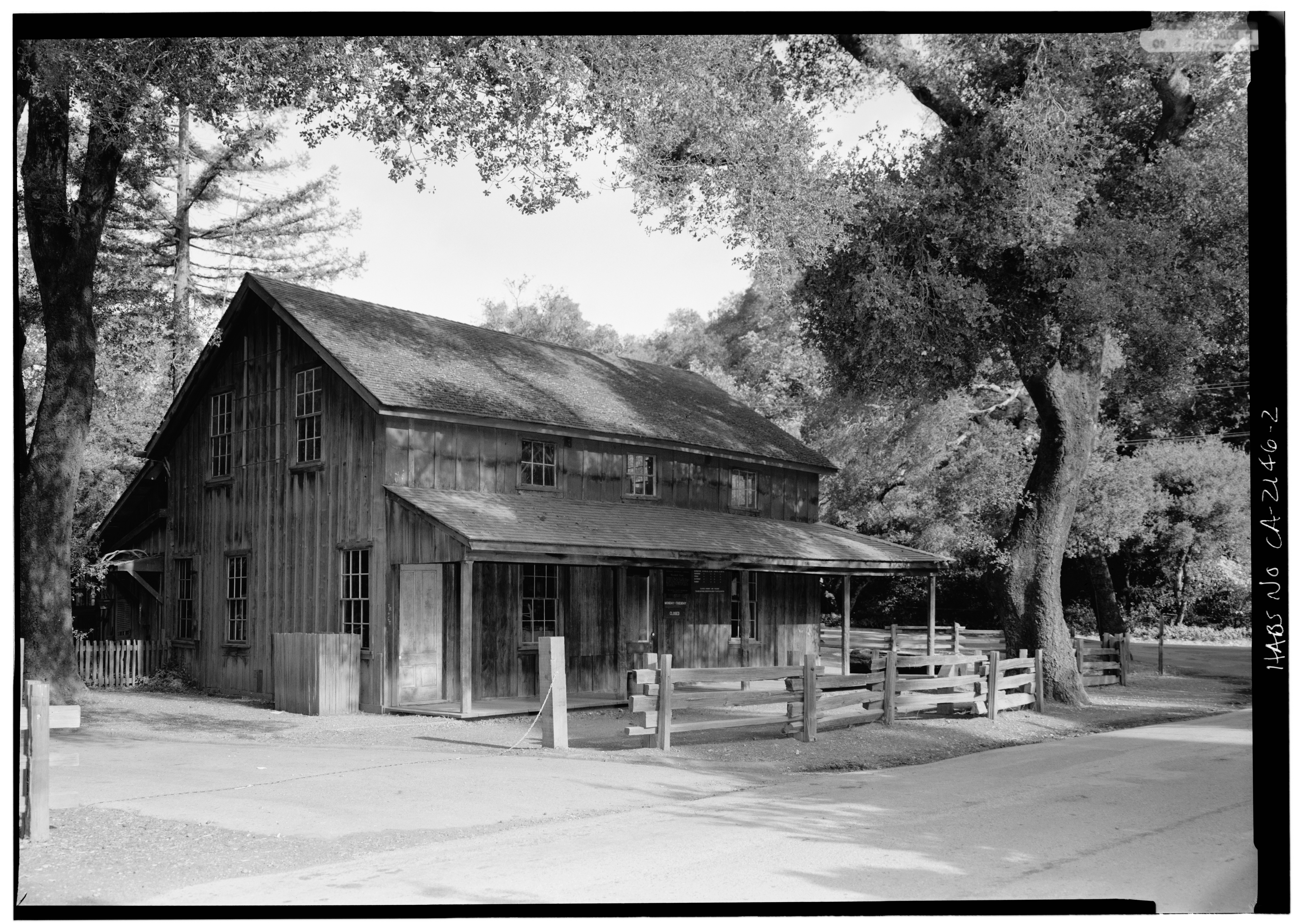
Exterior prior to restoration

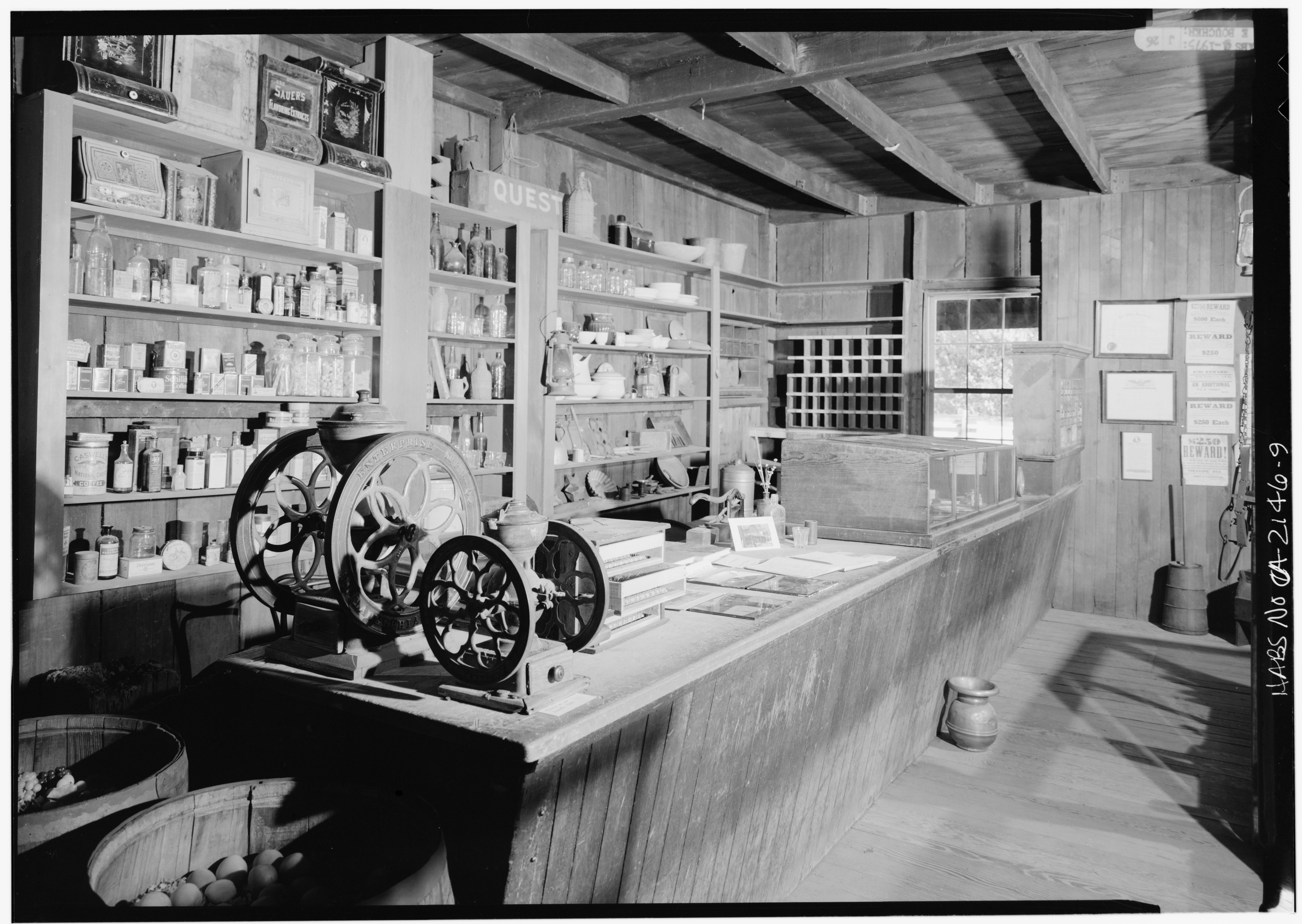
Interior of the Woodside Store

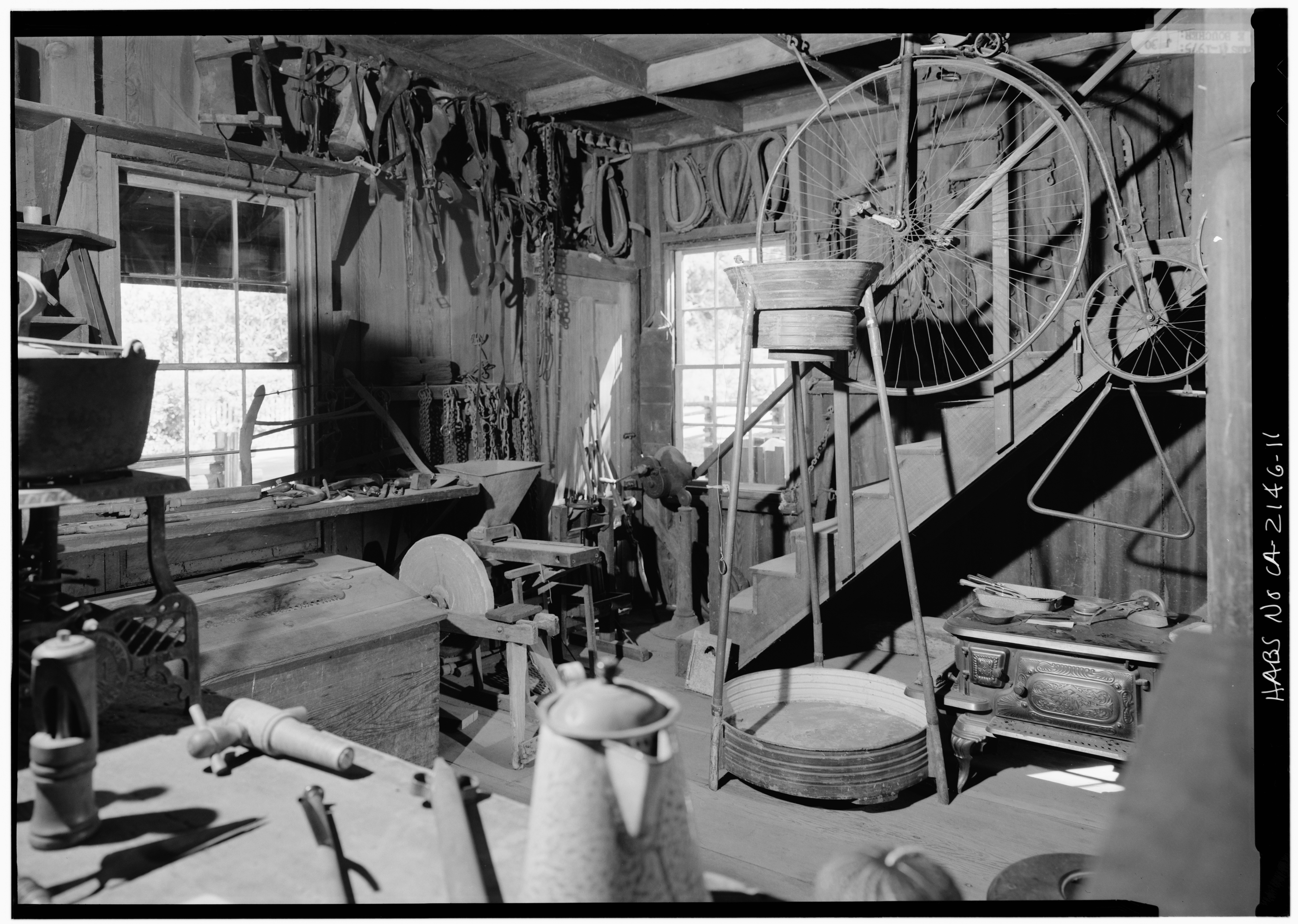
Interior of the Woodside Store, with staircase

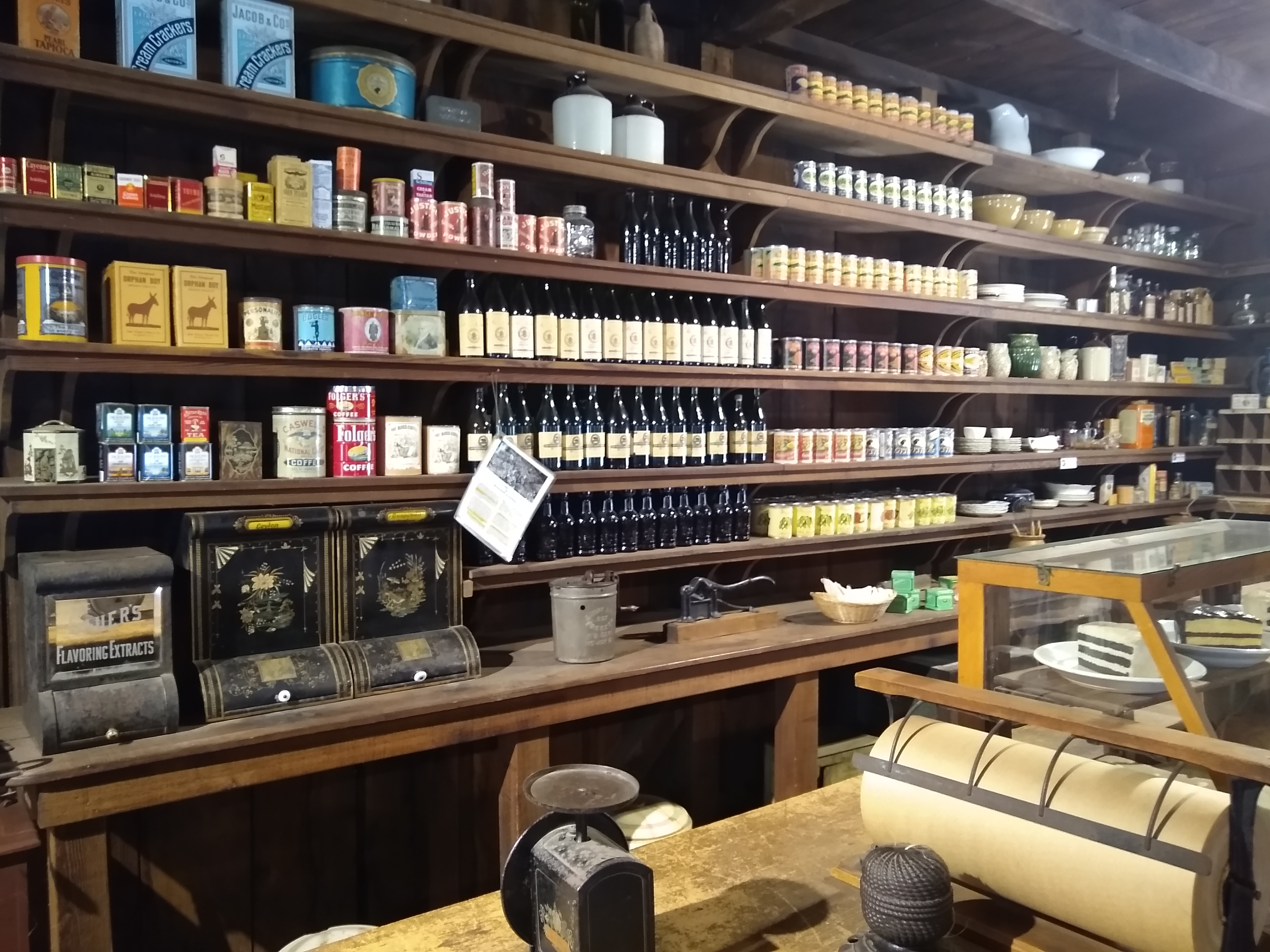
Interior of the store in 2021

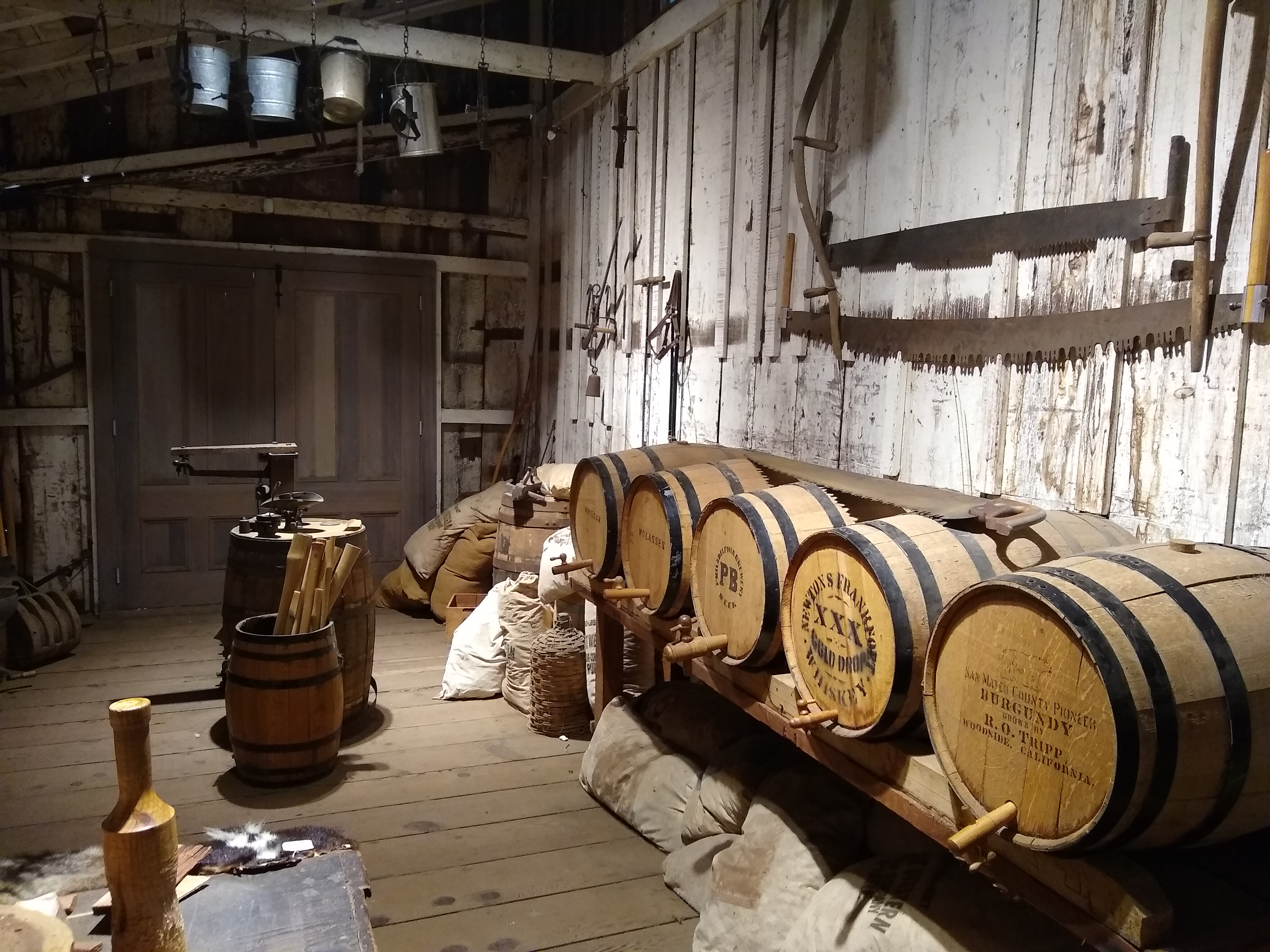
Interior storage room in 2021

== See also ==
- California Historical Landmarks in San Mateo County, California
- National Register of Historic Places listings in San Mateo County, California
- San Mateo County History Museum
