= John Howell Sears =

John Howell Sears (1823–1907) was an early pioneer of Searsville and La Honda, two cities in San Mateo County, California. He directly influenced the development of these cities.

== History ==
Born February 3, 1823 in Sullivan County, New York. He was living in Wayne County, Pennsylvania before arriving in San Francisco on August 1, 1850 by ship as a gold prospector during the Gold Rush. He traveled directly to the gold mines on initial arrival to the area and around Northern California to various mine locations before settling down.

By 1854 Sears lands in a lumber town later to be named Searsville, during the early days before the city was developed. He built his Sears hotel on Sand Hill Road near the entrance of the city and because of his postal contract, he may have had directly influenced the naming of the town.

Once the lumber industry had slowed down in Searsville, in 1862 he bought 400 acres of land in La Honda area and built the Old Store at La Honda and a hotel nearby. He had bought the Sausman Store in Old La Honda which had been the former center of town and he was responsible for moving the center of the town center to its current location. By 1880 Sears hires a blacksmith for the town, this blacksmith shop was owned by Sears later becomes Sear's grocery store and then "Apple Jack's Inn" which is a saloon currently in operation.

He was married to Nancy A. Mayhew (1829–1891) who preceded him in death and together they had three children; William, Ida and Anna. He died of pneumonia in 1907 at the age of 84 in La Honda and was buried in Union Cemetery in Redwood City, California with his family.
