= California Historical Landmarks in San Mateo County =

List table of the properties and districts listed as California Historical Landmarks within San Mateo County, California.

- Note: Click the "Map of all coordinates" link to the right to view a Google map of all properties and districts with latitude and longitude coordinates in the table below.

== Listings ==
Image		Landmark name	Location	City or town	Summary
Anza Expedition Camp	47	Anza Expedition Camp	Banks of San Mateo Creek; 37°33′44″N 122°19′44″W	San Mateo	March 29, 1776 camp
Anza Expedition Camp	48	Anza Expedition Camp	El Camino Real and Ralston; 37°34′33″N 122°20′52″W	Burlingame	March 26, 1776 camp
Broderick-Terry Dueling Place	19	Broderick-Terry Dueling Place	1100 Lake Merced Blvd. 37°42′29″N 122°29′03″W	Daly City	
Burlingame Station	846	Burlingame Station	290 California Dr. 37°34′48″N 122°20′42″W	Burlingame	Also on the NRHP list as NPS-78000769
Capidro	939.8	Capidro	262 Princeton Rd. 37°26′36″N 122°10′45″W	Menlo Park	Folk art ornamenting a Menlo Park home, no longer exists.
Carolands	886	Carolands	565 Remillard Rd. 37°33′20″N 122°22′15″W	Hillsborough	Also on the NRHP list as NPS-75000478
Casa de Tableta	825	Casa de Tableta	3915 Alpine Rd. 37°22′56″N 122°11′37″W	Portola Valley	Also called Alpine Inn, on the NRHP list as NPS-73000447
Filoli	907	Filoli	Filoli Center, Canada Rd. 37°28′13″N 122°18′39″W	Woodside	
First Congregational Church of Pescadero	949	First Congregational Church of Pescadero	San Gregorio St. 37°15′16″N 122°23′00″W	Pescadero	
Menlo Park Station	955	Menlo Park Station	1120 Merrill St. 37°27′17″N 122°10′51″W	Menlo Park	Also on the NRHP list as NPS-74000556
Mission Hospice	393	Mission Hospice	Baywood and El Camino Real; 37°33′55″N 122°19′41″W	San Mateo	Mission San Mateo, an outpost for Mission San Francisco de Asis (Dolores), was repurposed as an inn. Buildings no longer exist.
Old Store at La Honda	343	Old Store at La Honda	Northwest corner, La Honda Road and Sears Ranch Road; 37°19′10″N 122°16′29″W	La Honda	Building no longer exists.
Our Lady of the Wayside Church	909	Our Lady of the Wayside Church	930 Portola Rd. 37°23′02″N 122°14′02″W	Portola Valley	
Pigeon Point Lighthouse	930	Pigeon Point Lighthouse	37°10′54″N 122°23′38″W	Davenport	
Ohlone-Portolá Heritage Trail, Purisíma Creek	22	Ohlone-Portolá Heritage Trail, Purisíma Creek	Mouth of Purisíma Creek; 37°24′16″N 122°25′29″W	Half Moon Bay	October 27, 1769 camp
Ohlone-Portolá Heritage Trail at Gazos Creek	23	Ohlone-Portolá Heritage Trail at Gazos Creek	Mouth of Gazos Creek; 37°09′55″N 122°21′42″W	Pescadero	October 23, 1769 camp
Portolá Expedition Camp	24	Portolá Expedition Camp	Mouth of San Pedro Creek; 37°35′58″N 122°30′00″W	Pacifica	October 31, 1769 to November 3, 1769 camp
Ohlone-Portolá Heritage Trail at Montara Mountain	25	Ohlone-Portolá Heritage Trail at Montara Mountain	Foot of Montara Mountain; 37°33′15″N 122°30′36″W	Montara	October 30, 1769 camp
Portolá Expedition Camp	26	Portolá Expedition Camp	San Gregorio State Beach; 37°19′23″N 122°24′07″W	San Gregorio	October 24 to 26, 1769 camp
Portolá Expedition Camp	27	Portolá Expedition Camp	San Andreas Lake; 37°35′20″N 122°24′47″W	Millbrae	November 12, 1769 camp
Ohlone-Portolá Heritage Trail at Cañada de Reymundo	92	Ohlone-Portolá Heritage Trail at Cañada de Reymundo	Woodside Road and Cañada Road, Pulgas Water Temple; 37°28′59″N 122°18′56″W	Woodside	November 11, 1769 camp
Ohlone-Portolá Heritage Trail at Laguna Grande	94	Ohlone-Portolá Heritage Trail at Laguna Grande	North of Pulgas Water Temple, now Upper Crystal Springs Reservoir; 37°31′50″N 122°21′49″W	Woodside	November 5, 1769 camp
Portolá Journey's End	2	Portolá Journey's End	E. Creek Dr. and Alma St. 37°26′52″N 122°10′15″W	Menlo Park	November 1–3, 1769
Ralston Hall	856	Ralston Hall	College of Notre Dame, 1500 Ralston Ave; 37°31′03″N 122°17′10″W	Belmont	Also on the NRHP list as NPS-66000234.
Sánchez Adobe	391	Sánchez Adobe	Sánchez Adobe Park; 37°35′15″N 122°29′33″W	Pacifica	Also on the NRHP list as NPS-76000525. On the Ohlone-Portolá Heritage Trail.
San Francisco Bay Discovery Site	394	San Francisco Bay Discovery Site	Sweeney Ridge; 37°36′16″N 122°27′28″W	Pacifica	Also on the NRHP list as NPS-68000022. On the Ohlone-Portolá Heritage Trail.
San Mateo County's first sawmill - Charles Brown's sawmill	478	San Mateo County's first sawmill - Charles Brown's sawmill	Portola Rd. 37°24′18″N 122°15′19″W	Woodside	
Searsville	474	Searsville	Sandhill and Portola Rds. 37°24′10″N 122°14′43″W	Woodside	The site of the former village is located within Jasper Ridge Biological Preserve
Steele Brothers Dairy Ranches	906	Steele Brothers Dairy Ranches	Año Nuevo State Reserve; 37°07′09″N 122°18′26″W	Pescadero	
Tanforan Assembly Center	934	Tanforan Assembly Center	Tanforan Shopping Center; 37°38′10″N 122°25′09″W	San Bruno	
Ohlone-Portolá Heritage Trail at Tunitas Beach	375	Ohlone-Portolá Heritage Trail at Tunitas Beach	Mouth of Tunitas Creek at Tunitas Beach; 37°21′24″N 122°23′58″W	Half Moon Bay	In 1769 expedition discovered village on Tunitas Creek.
Union Cemetery	816	Union Cemetery	El Camino Real and Woodside Rd. 37°28′26″N 122°13′23″W	Redwood City	Also on the NRHP list as NPS-83001237
Woodside Store	93	Woodside Store	471 Kings Mountain Rd. 37°25′50″N 122°16′38″W	Woodside	
Ohlone-Portolá Heritage Trail at Año Nuevo	1058	Ohlone-Portolá Heritage Trail at Año Nuevo	At Año Nuevo State Park; 37°06′41″N 122°17′57″W	Pescadero	November 19, 1769 camp
Ohlone-Portolá Heritage Trail at Bean Hollow	1059	Ohlone-Portolá Heritage Trail at Bean Hollow	At Bean Hollow State Beach; 37°13′33″N 122°24′32″W	Pescadero	November 18, 1769 Camp
Ohlone-Portolá Heritage Trail at Pilarcitos Creek	21	Ohlone-Portolá Heritage Trail at Pilarcitos Creek	Near the mouth of Pilarcitos Creek at Half Moon Bay State Beach; 37°28′23″N 122°26′49″W	Half Moon Bay	October 28–29, 1769 Camp

== See also ==
- List of California Historical Landmarks
- National Register of Historic Places listings in San Mateo County, California
