= Charles Brown's saw mill =

Historical place in San Mateo County, United States

San Mateo County's First Sawmill Charles Brown's saw mill
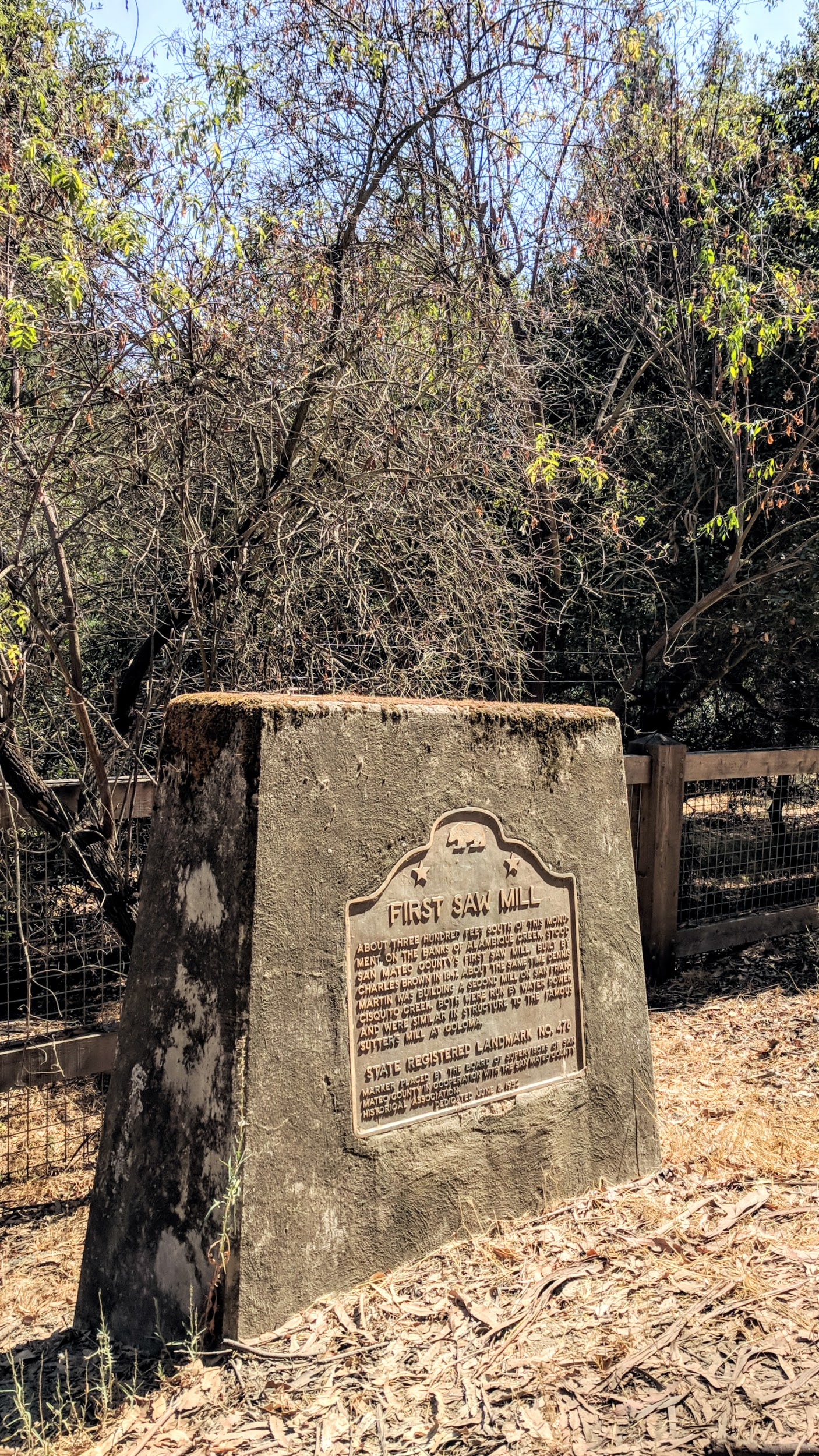
- Charles Brown's saw mill marker

- Location within California Location within the United States
- 37.4050°N 122.2554°W
- Location: Portola Road, near La Honda Road, Woodside, California

History
- Built: 1847

Site notes
- Architect: Charles Brown

California Historical Landmark
- Designated: November 9, 1950
- Reference no.: 478

Charles Brown's saw mill was the first saw mill in Woodside, California in San Mateo County, California. MCharles Brown's saw mill site is a California Historical Landmark No. 478 listed on November 9, 1950. San Mateo County's First Sawmill was built on the banks of Alambique Creek in 1847. San Mateo County's First Sawmill powered by the creek was built by Charles Brown. Also in 1847, a second mill was built on San Francisquito Creek by Dennis Martin. The sawmill design was similar to the famous sawmill at Sutter's Mill at Coloma. Sutter's Mill became famous when James W. Marshall found gold in 1848 at the mill. The find stated the California Gold Rush. Brown's adobe house, built in 1839, still stands today.

== See also ==
- California Historical Landmarks in San Mateo County
