= Capidro Folk Art =

Historical site in Menlo Park, California, US

- Location within California Location within the United States
- 37.443254°N 122.179274°W
- Location: 262 Princeton Road, Menlo Park, California

History
- Built: 1932

Site notes
- Architect: John Guidici
- Architectural style: Folk art

California Historical Landmark
- Reference no.: 939.8

Capidro is a historical site in Menlo Park, California, in San Mateo County. Capidro site is a California Historical Landmark No. 939.8. Capidro is number 8 in a part of group of California Historical Landmark on folk art, Twentieth Century Folk Art Environments (Thematic). Capidro was built by retired gardener, John Guidici (1887–1976). In 1932 Guidici began landscaping his Menlo Park house with cement, local sand, and the sea shells. There is no marker at the current site. Folk art ornamenting at the Menlo Park home, no longer exists, removed by new owners. Guidici's grandchildren saved some art pieces and there was an exhibit at San Jose State University in 1987 called Documenting Capedro. Capidro is Italian for "rock garden. Capidro was the gardener for President Herbert Hoover's garden in Stanford.

== See also ==
- California Historical Landmarks in San Mateo County
