= San Mateo County History Museum =

Museum in Redwood City, California

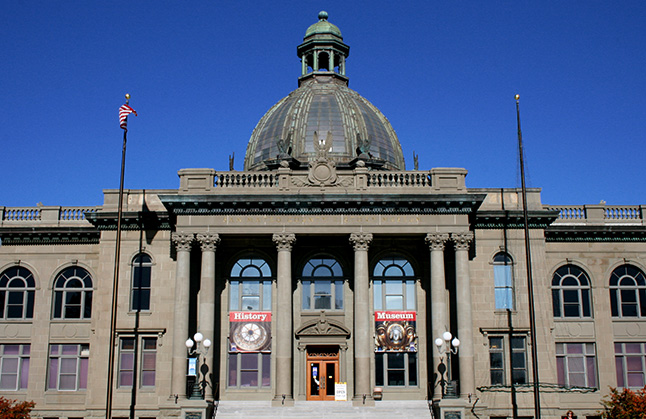
- The San Mateo County History Museum, located in the Old Courthouse

- Location within San Francisco Bay Area Location within California Location within the United States
- Former name: San Mateo County Historical Museum
- Established: 1935; Relocated in 1999
- Location: 2200 Broadway, Redwood City, CA
- Coordinates: 37°29′13″N 122°13′47″W
- Type: History
- Accreditation: AAM
- Visitors: 53,000+ annually
- Director: Mitch Postel
- Public transit access: Walking distance from the Redwood City Caltrain station
- Website: www.historysmc.org
- San Mateo County Courthouse
- U.S. National Register of Historic Places
- Area: 1.4 acres (0.57 ha)
- Built: 1910; 116 years ago
- Architectural style: Italian Renaissance Revival
- NRHP reference No.: 77000340
- Added to NRHP: December 13, 1977

The San Mateo County History Museum is located in downtown Redwood City, California. Housed inside the former courthouse built in 1910 for the San Mateo County Superior Court, the museum showcases the rich history of San Mateo County and the surrounding area. Operations and funding for the museum are by the San Mateo County Historical Association (SMCHA).

The current location of this museum opened on February 6, 1999; prior to that, from 1963 until 1998 the museum was located at the College of San Mateo. The former courthouse building is a product of the City Beautiful Movement (1893-1920) and has a stained-glass dome thought to be the largest of its kind on the West Coast.

The SMCHA also operates two other museums: the Woodside Store and the Sánchez Adobe Park.

== History ==
The San Mateo County Historical Association was founded in 1935. One of its early members was Dr. Frank Stanger, a history professor at San Mateo Junior College, now the College of San Mateo. Through his efforts, the San Mateo County Historical Museum (now the San Mateo County History Museum) was founded in a college classroom in 1963. As the college grew, so did the Museum. Then in 1998, seeking larger and more publicly accessible quarters, the Historical Association's board of directors decided to move the Museum into the old courthouse in downtown Redwood City. The Museum expanded from its 6,000 square-foot original location to 40,000 square feet. Between 1998 and 2006, more than $20 million was spent on the restoration and renovation of the exterior and interior of the museum.

== Programs ==
The San Mateo County Historical Association is known principally for the operation of its San Mateo County History Museum and two historic sites, the Woodside Store and Sánchez Adobe. In 2016, it conducted school programs for nearly 20,000 children at its three locations, plus Folger Stable in Woodside. It provides public access to its archives through its research library at the History Museum. Its collections compose about 420,000 two- and three-dimensional items. It organizes special educational programs for adults and children on a monthly basis. It maintains a creative schedule of changing exhibits at the San Mateo County History Museum. It publishes a journal, La Peninsula. Finally, it acts as a clearinghouse for matters of historic preservation throughout San Mateo County.

== Exhibits ==
=== Permanent exhibitions ===
- Nature's Bounty explores how the early people of the Peninsula used natural resources to support daily life and how those resources were used to help build San Francisco.
- Journey to Work: Pioneering Patterns of Growth tells the story of how transportation transformed San Mateo County from frontier to suburb.
- Living the California Dream uses an "object theater" to trace the evolution of the California Dream of suburban life using lighting effects on artifacts and video projection to add movement and drama.
- Land of Opportunity: The Immigrant Experience in San Mateo County tells the story of immigrants in the county, including arrivals, discrimination experiences, and maintaining previous cultural traditions.
- Maverick's features the history of the San Mateo County coast, the science of the 40' Maverick's wave, surfing videos, and a "waverider" where visitors can simulate surfing the waves of Maverick's.
- San Mateo County History Makers: Entrepreneurs Who Changed the World features local business minds who have invented, revolutionized and developed unique enterprises that have impacted the lives of people around the world.

=== Select temporary exhibitions ===
- 2019 – Our Story (February 18 - October 27, 2019), a two-part exhibit. Transformation of a Courthouse highlights the changes to the "Old Courthouse" location over 160 years, including images of the four courthouse buildings. 20 Years in Redwood City highlights activities at the History Museum in the 20 years since it opened at the “Old Courthouse” in 1999.
- 2016 – Experience the West: Sunset Cover Art, highlighting the history of Sunset magazine covers
- 2016 – Fight the Bite, history of 100 years of fighting mosquitoes on the San Francisco Bay Area Peninsula
- 2016 – Highlights the Charles Parsons' Ships of the World exhibition, 24 model ships hand-crafted and presentation about the history of maritime activities in San Mateo County like boat building in South San Francisco and shipping in Redwood City
- 2016 – Let's Play Ball, rare baseball memorabilia from San Mateo County
- 1999 – Grizzlies: The California King, about San Mateo County's grizzly bear history

== Other Historic Sites ==
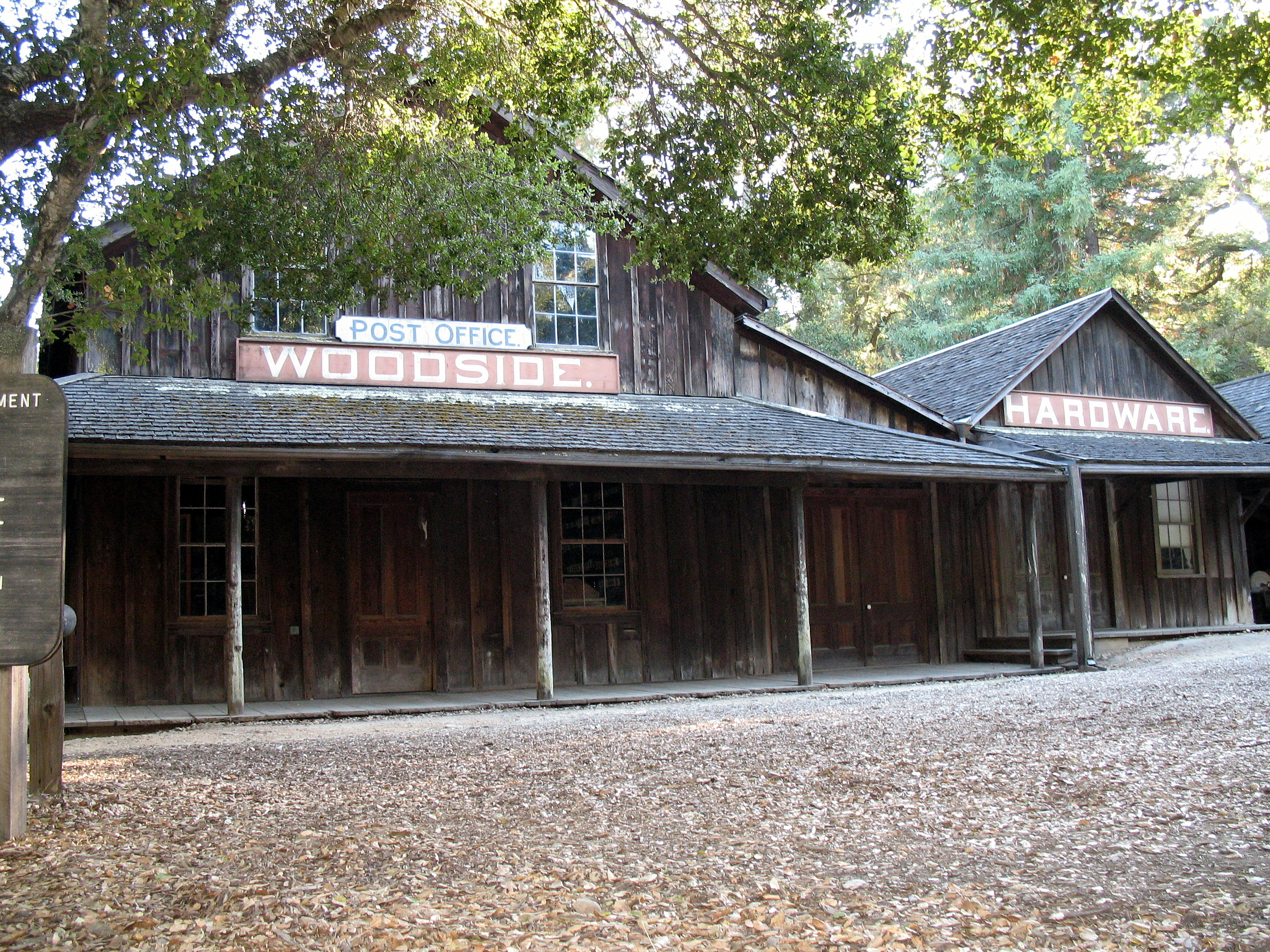
Woodside Store

The association began managing its other two historic sites in 1979. The Woodside Store and Sánchez Adobe were, and still are, San Mateo County Parks, but after the passage of Proposition 13, which resulted in severe cuts to the parks' budget, the Historical Association was enlisted to keep them open to the public. Since that time, the Historical Association has developed outdoor education programs for school groups at the sites.

=== Woodside Store ===
The Woodside Store was constructed in 1854 by pioneer dentist Robert Orville Tripp and Mathias Parkhurst. This redwood emporium sat in the middle of the San Francisco Peninsula's lumbering district; it was, for a time, the only general store between San Francisco and Santa Clara. It was preserved through the efforts of the Historical Association in the 1940s. After being taken under the wing of the association in 1979, it was subject to a substantial restoration during the mid-1980s and completed by 1994.

=== Sánchez Adobe ===
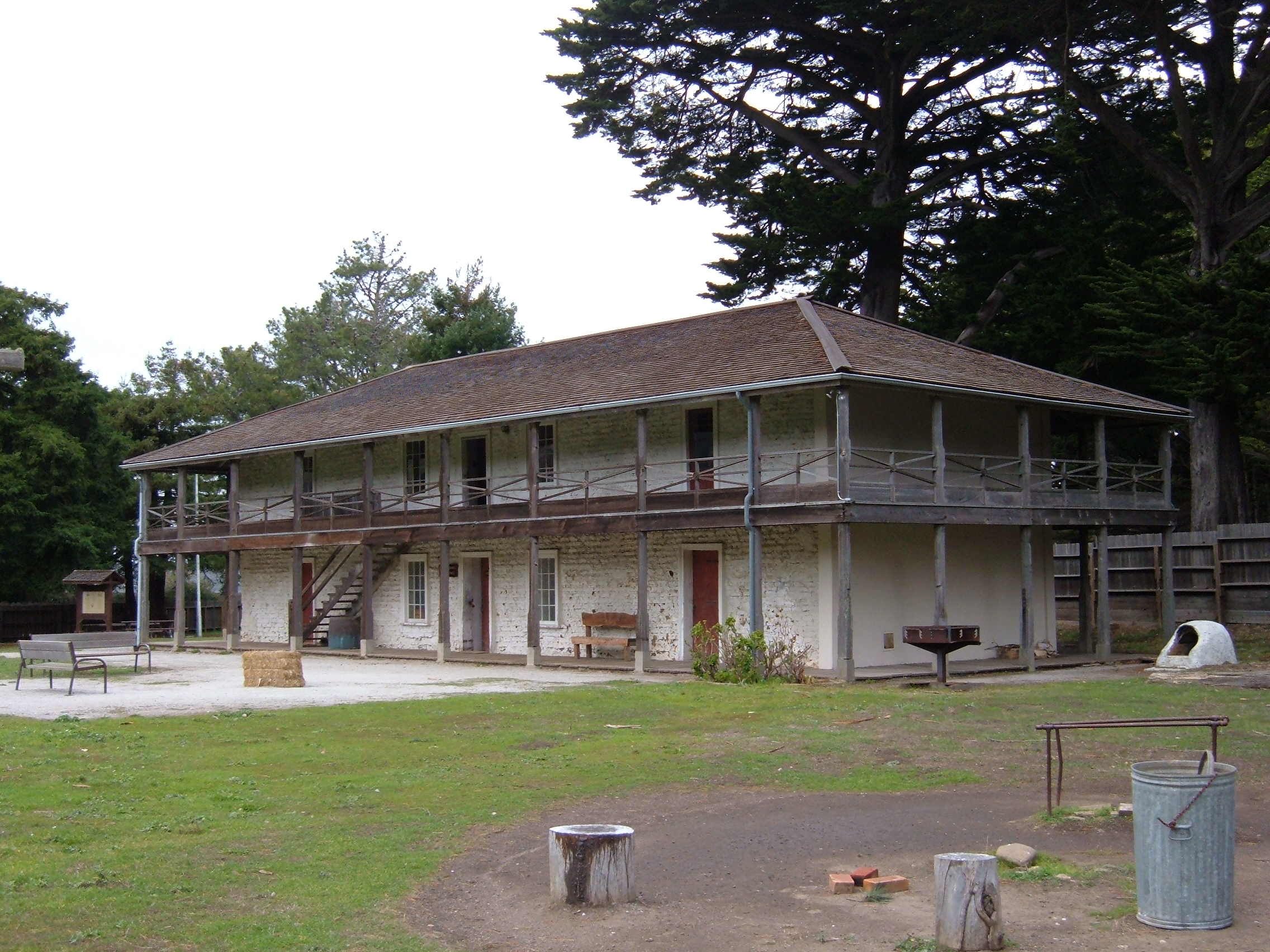
Sánchez Adobe

The Sánchez Adobe is the site of important regional history during the first three periods of California History. During Native California times the Aramai people established the village of Pruristac here. During the Spanish colonial period, it was an important agricultural outpost. During Mexican times, Francisco Sánchez, one-time Alcalde of Yerba Buena (later San Francisco), built his substantial adobe house at this site, which was completed in 1846. Lobbying efforts of the Historical Association inspired the county to obtain the five-acre site for a park in the 1940s. Since 1978, extensive archaeological investigations have been accomplished. Today, the County and the Historical Association are working on a master plan to improve the interpretive value of this unique location.

== See also ==
- California Historical Landmarks in San Mateo County, California
- List of museums in the San Francisco Bay Area
- National Register of Historic Places listings in San Mateo County, California
- San Mateo County, California
