= Woodside, California =

Town in California, United States

- Town
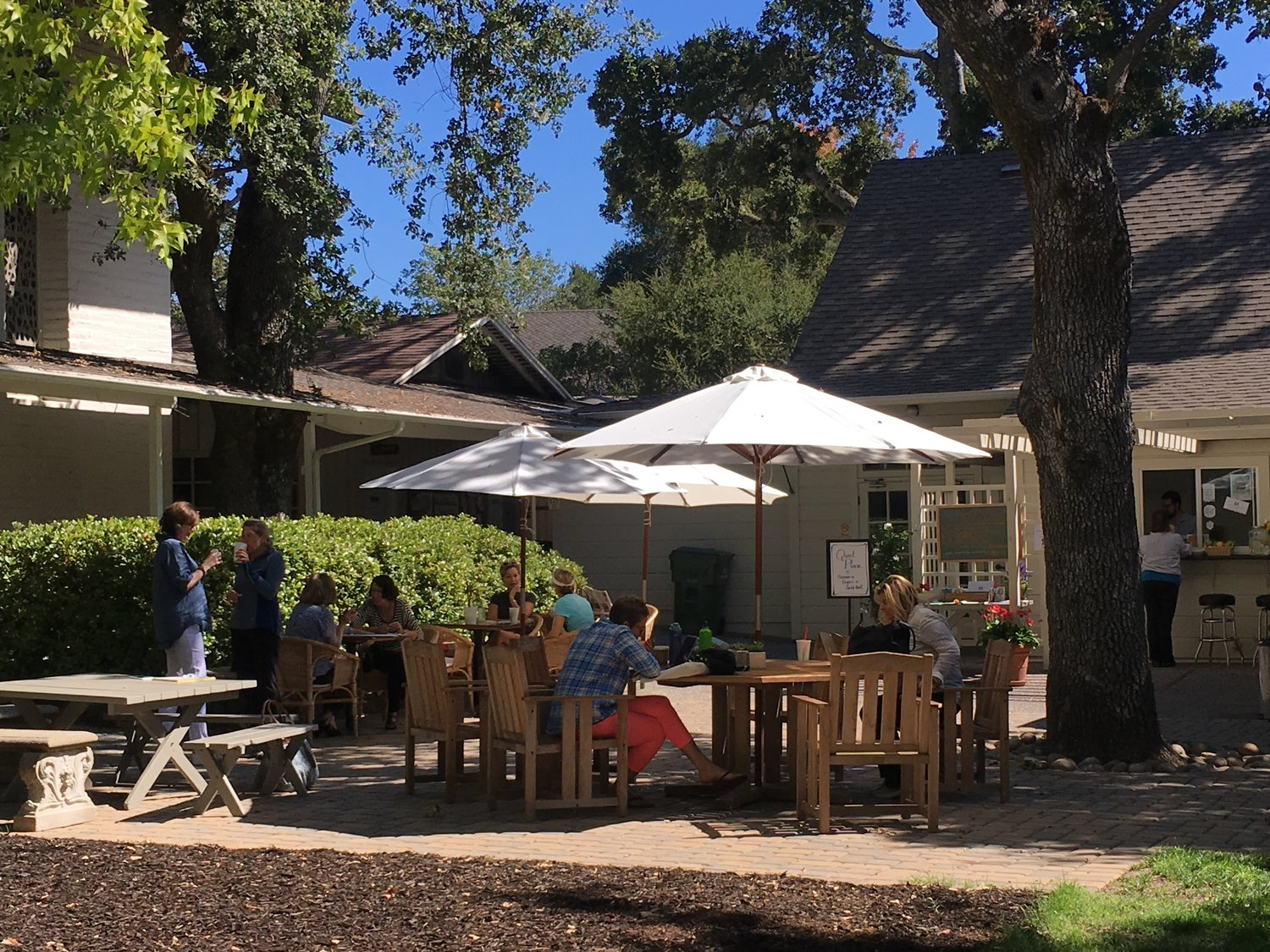
- The Village Hub in Woodside

- Seal
- Interactive map of Woodside, California
- Location in the United States Woodside (the United States)
- Coordinates: 37°25′47″N 122°15′15″W
- Country: United States
- State: California
- County: San Mateo
- Incorporated: November 16, 1956

Government
  - Type: Town Council

Area
  - Total: 11.47 sq mi (29.70 km^{2})
  - Land: 11.47 sq mi (29.70 km^{2})
  - Water: 0 sq mi (0.00 km^{2}) 0%
- Elevation: 387 ft (118 m)

Population (2020)
  - Total: 5,309
  - Density: 463.0/sq mi (178.8/km^{2})
- Time zone: UTC−8 (Pacific)
  - Summer (DST): UTC−7 (PDT)
- ZIP codes: 94061–94062
- Area code: 650
- FIPS code: 06-86440
- GNIS feature IDs: 1660202, 2413509
- Website: www.woodsideca.gov

Woodside is an incorporated town in San Mateo County, California, United States, on the San Francisco Peninsula. It has a council–manager system of government.

The population of the town was 5,309 at the 2020 census. The town's population has a median household income above $250,000 and median home price above $5 million. The town is known for its quaint and small town feel despite being close to Silicon Valley, and is home to many venture capital and investment firms.

== History ==
The Woodside area was originally home to the Ohlone tribe. In 1769, led by Gaspar de Portolá, Spanish explorers searching for San Francisco Bay camped at a site near Woodside. In 1840, the land that was to be the future Woodside became part of a Mexican land grant, Rancho Cañada de Raymundo, which in 1841 was granted to an Englishman, John Coppinger.

Woodside is said to be the oldest English-speaking settlement in the southern part of the San Francisco Peninsula. The first English-speaking settlers arrived in the early 19th century to log the rich stands of redwoods. Charles Brown constructed the first sawmill in Woodside on his Mountain Home Ranch around 1847. Brown's adobe house still stands today. By mid-century, the Woodside area had a dozen mills producing building materials for a booming San Francisco.

In 1849, during the California Gold Rush, 20-year-old Mathias Alfred Parkhurst purchased 127 acres (0.5 km^{2}) of timberland and named it "Woodside". By the late 19th century, Woodside was home to country estates. The Sequoia Redwood trees in Woodside are currently 3rd generation growth; the first generation of which were used to build San Francisco's original homes. After the 1906 San Francisco earthquake, the loggers returned to Woodside to cut the second growth of redwood so it could be used for the rebuilding of San Francisco.

In 1909, the Family, a private club in San Francisco, set up camp facilities and rustic buildings in Woodside at the Family Farm, a rural retreat used by club members for recreation. Gatherings at the Family Farm include an annual Farm Play, written and performed by members. In 1912, the Family pooled funds to build Our Lady of the Wayside Church in Portola Valley, designed by 19-year-old Timothy L. Pflueger, his first commission. The historic building was repaired at a cost of $600,000 after the 1989 Loma Prieta earthquake.

Woodside was incorporated in 1956 and it retains a rural residential character even though it is only a short commute to Silicon Valley and Stanford University.

In early 2022, the town initially declared itself a mountain lion habitat to circumvent state affordable housing requirements and then subsequently retracted that position. It backed down after California Attorney General Rob Bonta denied this claim writing, "[t]here is no valid basis to claim that the entire town of Woodside is a habitat for mountain lions."

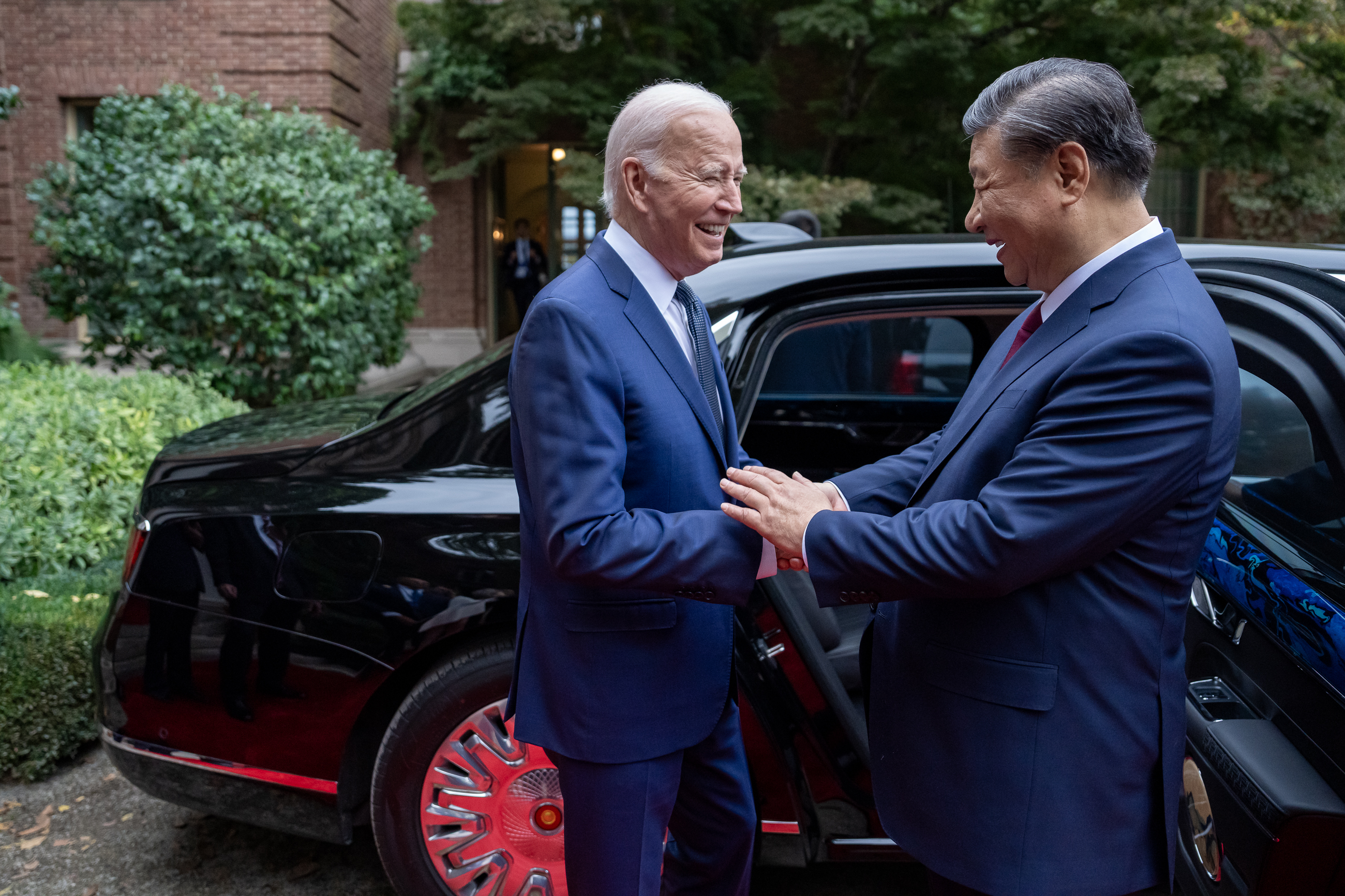
Biden bids farewell to Xi Jinping after the APEC 2023 meeting at Filoli near the town of Woodside, California.

On November 15, 2023, a meeting was held at the Filoli estate in Unincorporated San Mateo County near the town of Woodside, between President Biden and General Secretary of the Chinese Communist Party Xi Jinping amid the 2023 Asia-Pacific Economic Cooperation summit taking place in San Francisco. After meeting with Chinese leader Xi Jinping that day, Biden announced the two made progress on a common understanding to crack down on chemicals trafficked from China that are used to make fentanyl, improve military communications in the Indo-Pacific, and address risks associated with artificial intelligence.

== Geography ==
Woodside is located on the San Francisco Peninsula in San Mateo County. The town is on the eastern slopes of the Santa Cruz Mountains and its south-western boundary reaches California State Route 35 which runs along the ridge of those mountains. Redwood City to the north with Atherton and Menlo Park to the east lie between Woodside and the San Francisco Bay. To the south is Portola Valley.

Much of Woodside is wooded, with redwoods and Douglas fir dominating in the western hills and more oaks and eucalyptus in the lower areas. West Union Creek joins Bear Creek in Woodside. Woodside has a variety of habitat types including California oak woodland and riparian zones. There is considerable biodiversity present, Woodside being within the California Floristic Province. Notable species present include the rare and endangered species Acanthomintha duttonii, the San Mateo Thornmint. The San Andreas Fault runs through portions of Woodside.

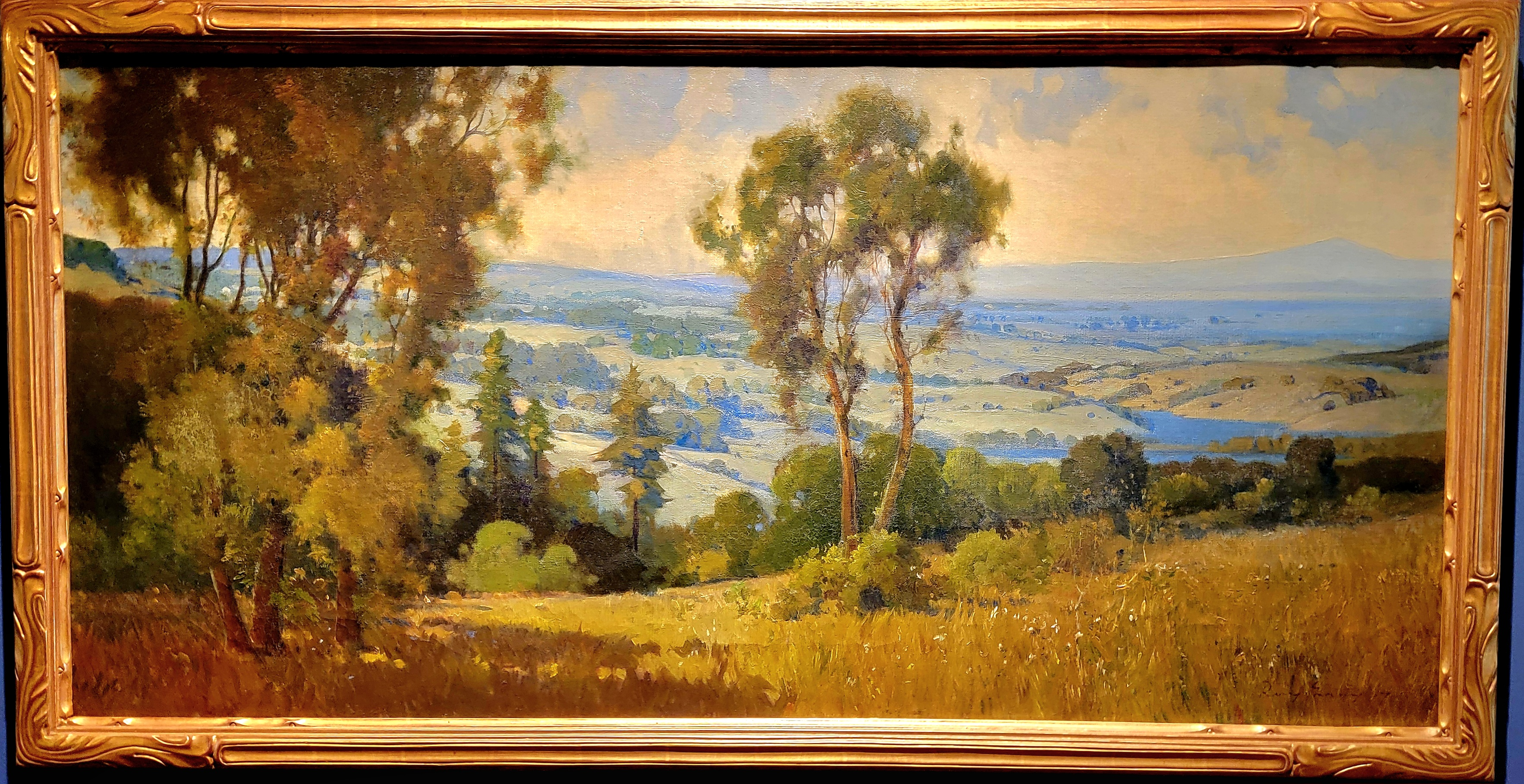
View Across the Valley, a 1917 painting of Woodside

=== Climate ===
As is true of most of the California coastal areas, weather in Woodside is usually mild during most of the year. Summers are dry and can be hot; winter temperatures rarely dip much below freezing. Average January temperatures are a maximum of 60 °F (16 °C) and a minimum of 36 °F (2 °C). Average July temperatures are a maximum of 88 °F (31 °C) and a minimum of 51 °F (11 °C). Snowfall is extremely rare except in the nearby Santa Cruz Mountains, where several inches falls every several years. Annual precipitation averages 30.9 in (780 mm) and falls on an average of 61 days annually.

The record maximum temperature was 114 °F (46 °C) on July 22, 2006, and the record minimum temperature was 17 °F (−8 °C) on February 6, 1989. Temperatures reach 90 °F (32 °C) or higher on an average of 48.4 days annually. Temperatures drop to freezing on an average of 10.0 days annually. The maximum rainfall in one year was 59.86 in (1,520 mm) in 1983. The maximum rainfall in one month was 20.50 in (521 mm) in December 2002 and the maximum in 24 hours was 4.64 in (118 mm) on December 1, 2002. On February 5, 1976, 3.0 in (7.6 cm) of snow fell at the fire station.

Hills and mountains between Woodside and the Pacific coast make fog much less prevalent than in nearby San Francisco. As well, during the summer, Woodside's climate is hotter than that of San Francisco.

Climate data for Woodside, California
Month	Jan	Feb	Mar	Apr	May	Jun	Jul	Aug	Sep	Oct	Nov	Dec	Year
Record high °F (°C)	75 (24)	84 (29)	88 (31)	99 (37)	104 (40)	108 (42)	111 (44)	114 (46)	108 (42)	106 (41)	90 (32)	76 (24)	114 (46)
Mean maximum °F (°C)	70 (21)	76 (24)	79 (26)	88 (31)	95 (35)	100 (38)	102 (39)	102 (39)	99 (37)	94 (34)	79 (26)	69 (21)	102 (39)
Mean daily maximum °F (°C)	61.2 (16.2)	64.3 (17.9)	68.5 (20.3)	73.0 (22.8)	78.7 (25.9)	84.1 (28.9)	88.1 (31.2)	88.4 (31.3)	86.1 (30.1)	79.8 (26.6)	67.6 (19.8)	60.9 (16.1)	75.1 (23.9)
Daily mean °F (°C)	49.0 (9.4)	51.7 (10.9)	54.8 (12.7)	57.8 (14.3)	62.3 (16.8)	66.5 (19.2)	69.9 (21.1)	69.8 (21.0)	68.0 (20.0)	62.7 (17.1)	54.0 (12.2)	48.9 (9.4)	59.6 (15.3)
Mean daily minimum °F (°C)	36.8 (2.7)	39.1 (3.9)	41.2 (5.1)	42.6 (5.9)	46.1 (7.8)	48.9 (9.4)	51.8 (11.0)	51.3 (10.7)	49.9 (9.9)	49.8 (9.9)	40.5 (4.7)	37.0 (2.8)	44.6 (7.0)
Mean minimum °F (°C)	28 (−2)	29 (−2)	32 (0)	34 (1)	39 (4)	42 (6)	43 (6)	44 (7)	42 (6)	36 (2)	30 (−1)	27 (−3)	26 (−3)
Record low °F (°C)	19 (−7)	17 (−8)	28 (−2)	30 (−1)	29 (−2)	36 (2)	35 (2)	28 (−2)	38 (3)	25 (−4)	23 (−5)	20 (−7)	17 (−8)
Average precipitation inches (mm)	5.56 (141)	5.49 (139)	4.26 (108)	1.89 (48)	0.65 (17)	0.14 (3.6)	0.01 (0.25)	0.04 (1.0)	0.19 (4.8)	1.25 (32)	3.57 (91)	5.42 (138)	28.47 (723.65)
Average snowfall inches (cm)	0.0 (0.0)	0.1 (0.25)	0.0 (0.0)	0.5 (1.3)	0.0 (0.0)	0.0 (0.0)	0.0 (0.0)	0.0 (0.0)	0.0 (0.0)	0.0 (0.0)	0.0 (0.0)	0.1 (0.25)	0.7 (1.8)
Source: NOAA

== Demographics ==
Historical population
Census	Pop.	Note	%±
1960	3,592		—
1970	4,734		31.8%
1980	5,291		11.8%
1990	5,035		−4.8%
2000	5,352		6.3%
2010	5,287		−1.2%
2020	5,309		0.4%
U.S. Decennial Census; 1860–1870 1880-1890; 1900 1910 1920; 1930 1940 1950; 1960 1970 1980; 1990 2000 2010; 2020

=== Racial and ethnic composition ===
Woodside town, California – Racial and ethnic composition Note: the US Census treats Hispanic/Latino as an ethnic category. This table excludes Latinos from the racial categories and assigns them to a separate category. Hispanics/Latinos may be of any race.
Race / Ethnicity (NH = Non-Hispanic)	Pop 2000	Pop 2010	Pop 2020	% 2000	% 2010	% 2020
White alone (NH)	4,686	4,552	4,080	87.56%	86.10%	76.85%
Black or African American alone (NH)	20	23	34	0.37%	0.44%	0.64%
Native American or Alaska Native alone (NH)	7	4	3	0.13%	0.08%	0.06%
Asian alone (NH)	263	331	438	4.91%	6.26%	8.25%
Native Hawaiian or Pacific Islander alone (NH)	6	3	3	0.11%	0.06%	0.06%
Other race alone (NH)	10	9	29	0.19%	0.17%	0.55%
Mixed race or Multiracial (NH)	128	122	318	2.39%	2.31%	5.99%
Hispanic or Latino (any race)	232	243	404	4.33%	4.60%	7.61%
Total	5,352	5,287	5,309	100.00%	100.00%	100.00%

=== 2020 census ===
As of the 2020 census, Woodside had a population of 5,309. The median age was 50.4 years. 20.4% of residents were under the age of 18 and 24.3% of residents were 65 years of age or older. For every 100 females there were 94.1 males, and for every 100 females age 18 and over there were 93.1 males age 18 and over.

61.3% of residents lived in urban areas, while 38.7% lived in rural areas.

There were 1,923 households in Woodside, of which 30.7% had children under the age of 18 living in them. Of all households, 66.6% were married-couple households, 11.5% were households with a male householder and no spouse or partner present, and 17.8% were households with a female householder and no spouse or partner present. About 17.4% of all households were made up of individuals and 9.9% had someone living alone who was 65 years of age or older.

There were 2,167 housing units, of which 11.3% were vacant. The homeowner vacancy rate was 1.2% and the rental vacancy rate was 5.8%.

Racial composition as of the 2020 census
Race	Number	Percent
White	4,138	77.9%
Black or African American	34	0.6%
American Indian and Alaska Native	10	0.2%
Asian	446	8.4%
Native Hawaiian and Other Pacific Islander	5	0.1%
Some other race	106	2.0%
Two or more races	570	10.7%

=== 2010 census ===
At the 2010 census Woodside had a population of 5,287. The population density was 450.6 inhabitants per square mile (174.0/km^{2}). ' There were 1,977 households. The average household size was 2.67. There were 1,487 families (75.2% of households); the average family size was 3.01. The median age was 48.8 years. The homeowner vacancy rate was 0.9%; the rental vacancy rate was 3.7%.

=== Income and poverty ===
In 2023, the US Census Bureau estimated that the median household income was more than $250,000, and the per capita income was $152,475. About 2.2% of families and 4.2% of the population were below the poverty line.

== Parks and recreation ==
Numerous residents keep horses, and the town government maintains a network of horse trails. Some residents live on farmland used for business. The town is also popular among local cyclists and draws them in large numbers on weekends. The most popular road cycling routes include Old La Honda Road, King's Mountain Road, Cañada Road, Skyline Boulevard and Highway 84. The Tour of California bicycle race includes several roads along and adjacent to CA-84 and Skyline Boulevard.

Woodside is home to a number of open space preserves, including the Purisima Open Space (part of the Midpeninsula Regional Open Space), where both horseback riding and bicycling are allowed. For mountain biking, the famous Skeggs Point is located in Woodside along Skyline Boulevard. It is also home to Huddart County Park, which is accessible by authorized motor vehicles, pedestrians, and horses on Kings Mountain Road.

Wunderlich Park is extremely popular with both hiking and horse enthusiasts. The trails in this park are shared by those on foot and on horse and span almost 1000 acres.

== Arts and culture ==
=== Djerassi Resident Artists Program ===
Dr. Carl Djerassi founded an artists' colony south of Woodside in memory of his late daughter Pamela. The Djerassi Artists Residency is one of several Bay Area programs that houses artists.

=== Filoli Historic House & Gardens ===
Filoli Gardens is a historic estate in Woodside, featuring a 54,000-square-foot Georgian Revival mansion and 16 acres of formal gardens on a 654-acre property. Built between 1915 and 1917 for mining magnate William Bowers Bourn II, the site is managed by the National Trust for Historic Preservation. Filoli is open to the public and is known for its horticultural collections, seasonal displays, and use as a venue for cultural and educational programs.

== Politics ==
In the California State Legislature, Woodside is in the 13th senatorial district, represented by Democrat Josh Becker, and in the 23rd Assembly district, represented by Democrat Marc Berman.

Federally, Woodside is in California's 16th congressional district, represented by Democrat Sam Liccardo.

== Schools ==
The Woodside Elementary School District operates public elementary and middle schools. The Sequoia Union High School District operates Woodside High School.

Funding for public schools in Woodside are supplemented by grants from private foundations set up for that purpose and funded by local residents that enables Woodside to have one of the highest per pupil funding rates for elementary school and middle school students in the Bay Area.

== Points of interest ==
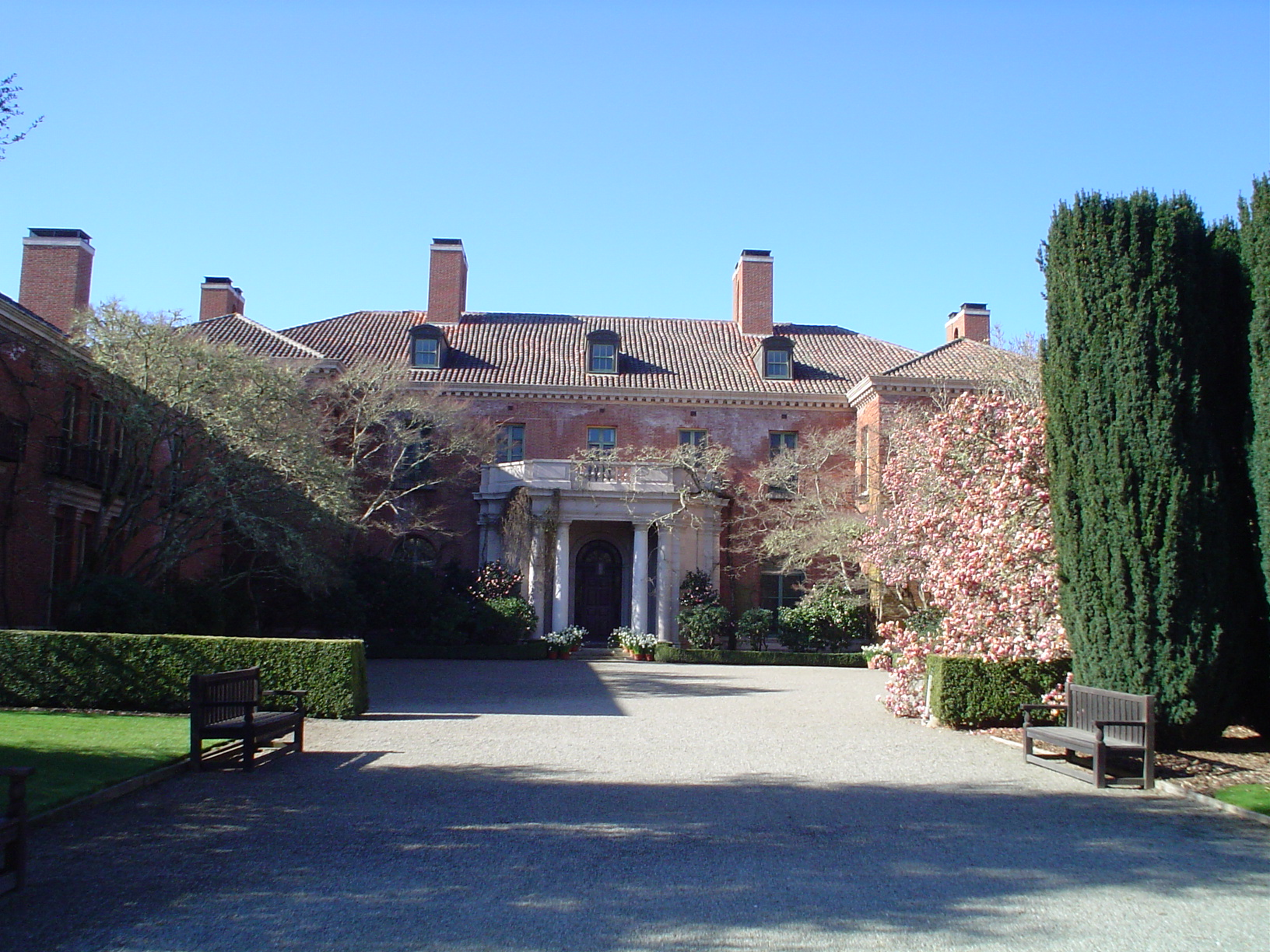
Filoli Estate

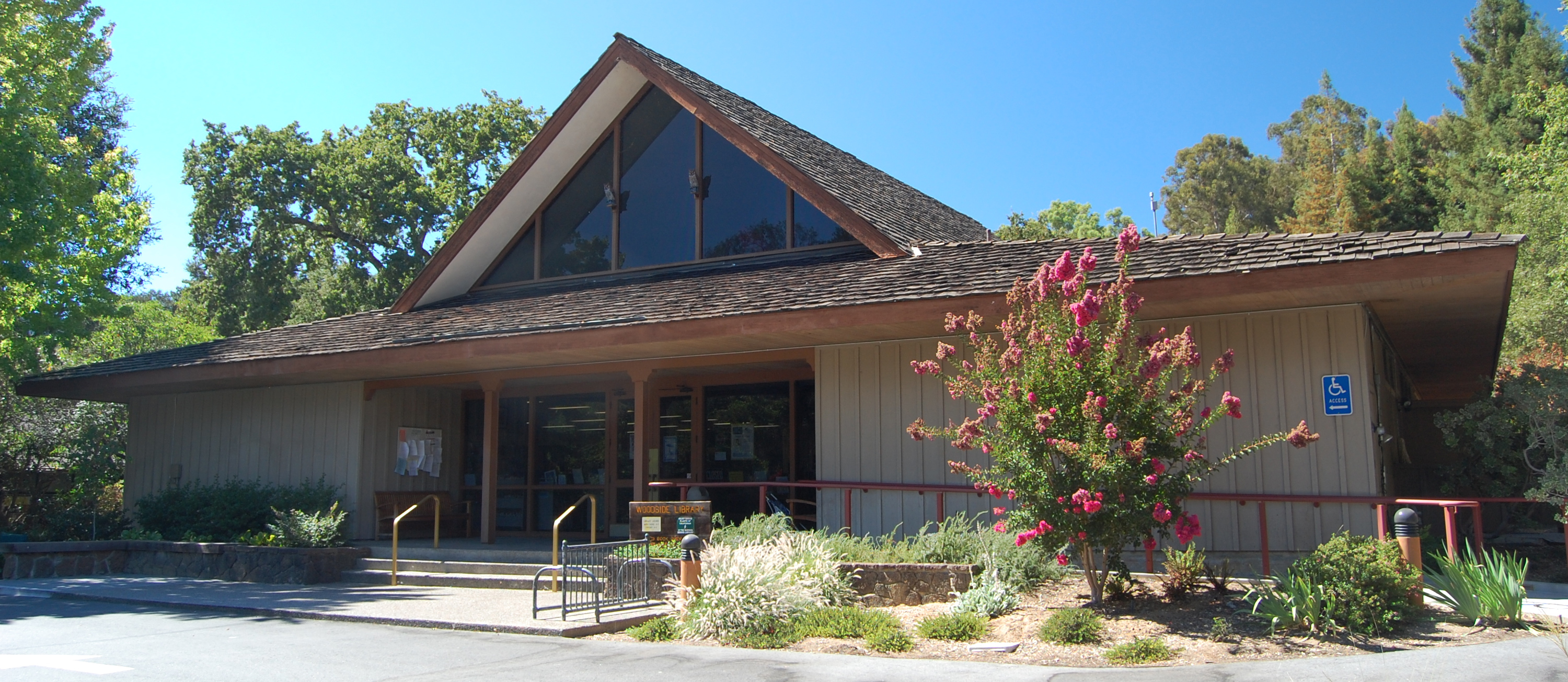
Woodside Public Library

The Woodside Store, a local park includes a preserved historic hardware store.

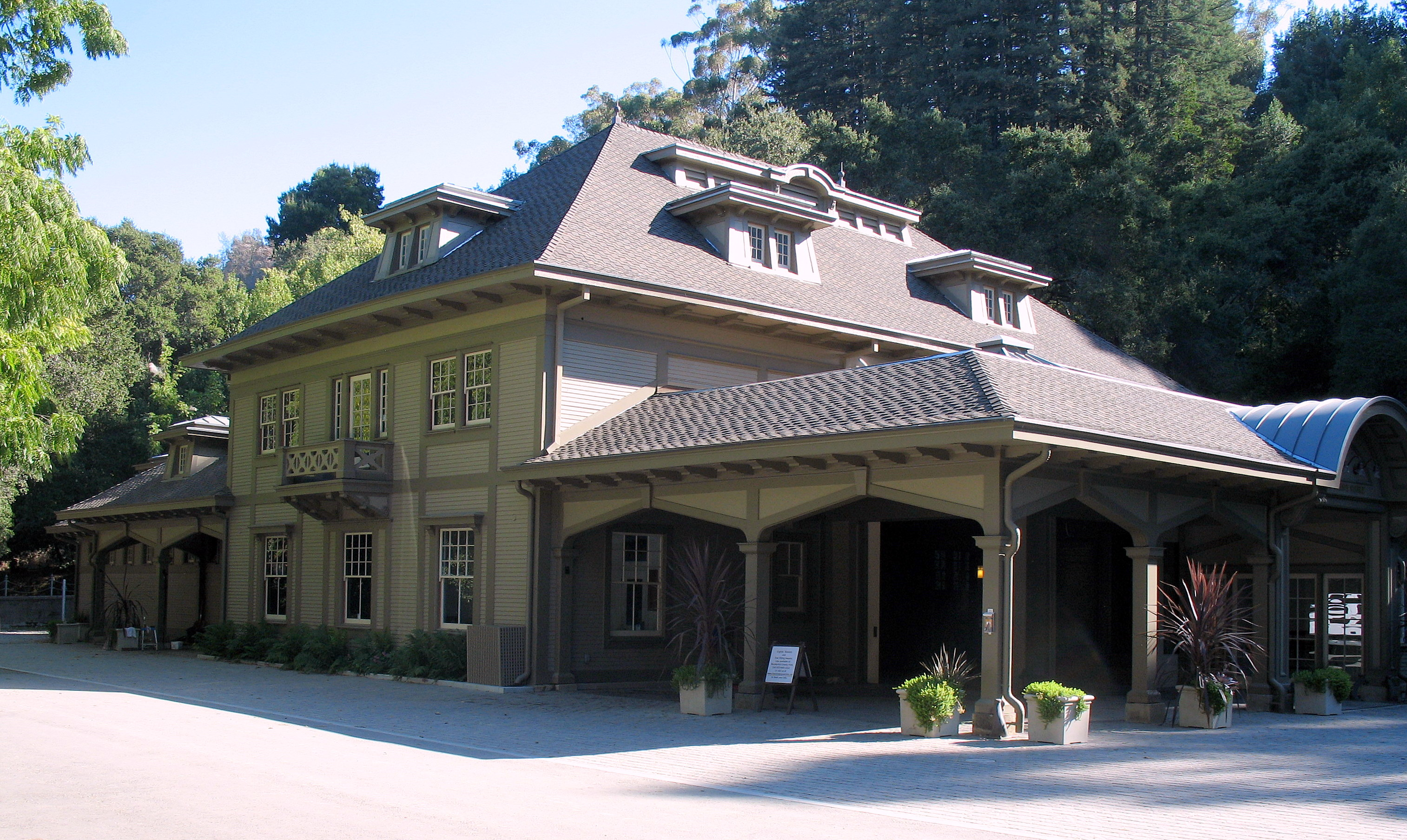
Folger Estate Stable Historic District, within Wunderlich Park.

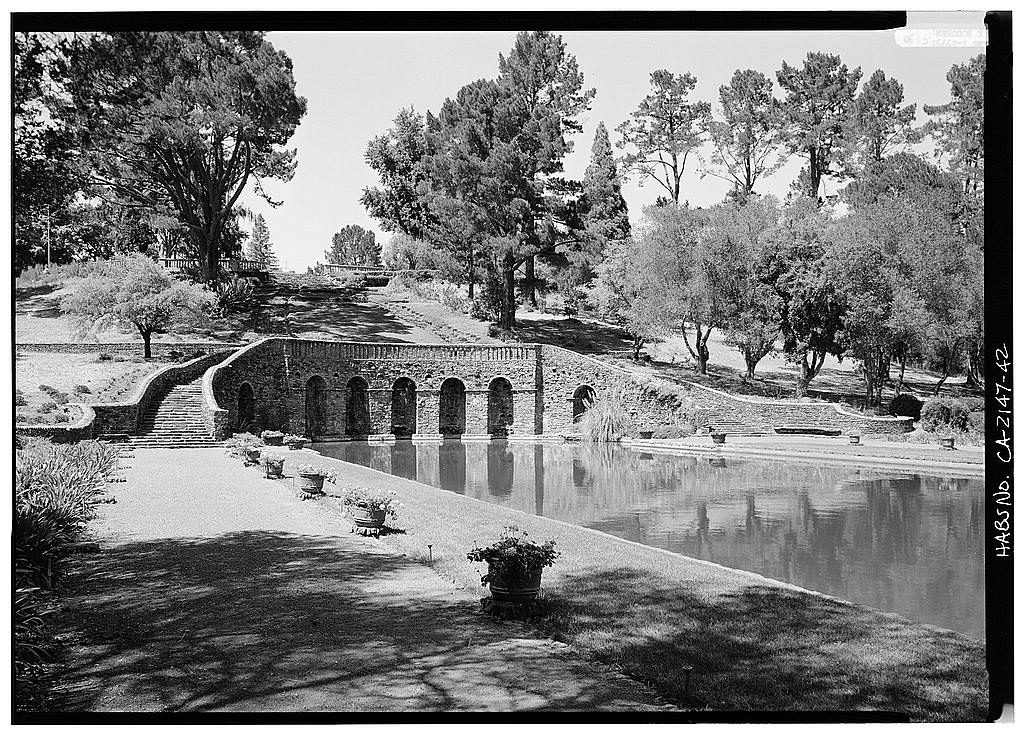
Mortimer Fleishhacker House and Estate

The city is served by the Woodside Public Library of the San Mateo County Libraries, a member of the Peninsula Library System.

== In popular culture ==
The Mortimer Fleishhacker House was filmed as the Martin family house in the Robin Williams movie Bicentennial Man. Dynasty was filmed at the Filoli Estate (not the interior of the mansion, but the exterior), as were the films The Wedding Planner, The Game, Lolita, George of the Jungle, Heaven Can Wait, and Harold and Maude. The musical Rent also has a scene filmed inside the Filoli Estate.

== Notable people ==
Several notable people who live or have lived in Woodside, California, include:

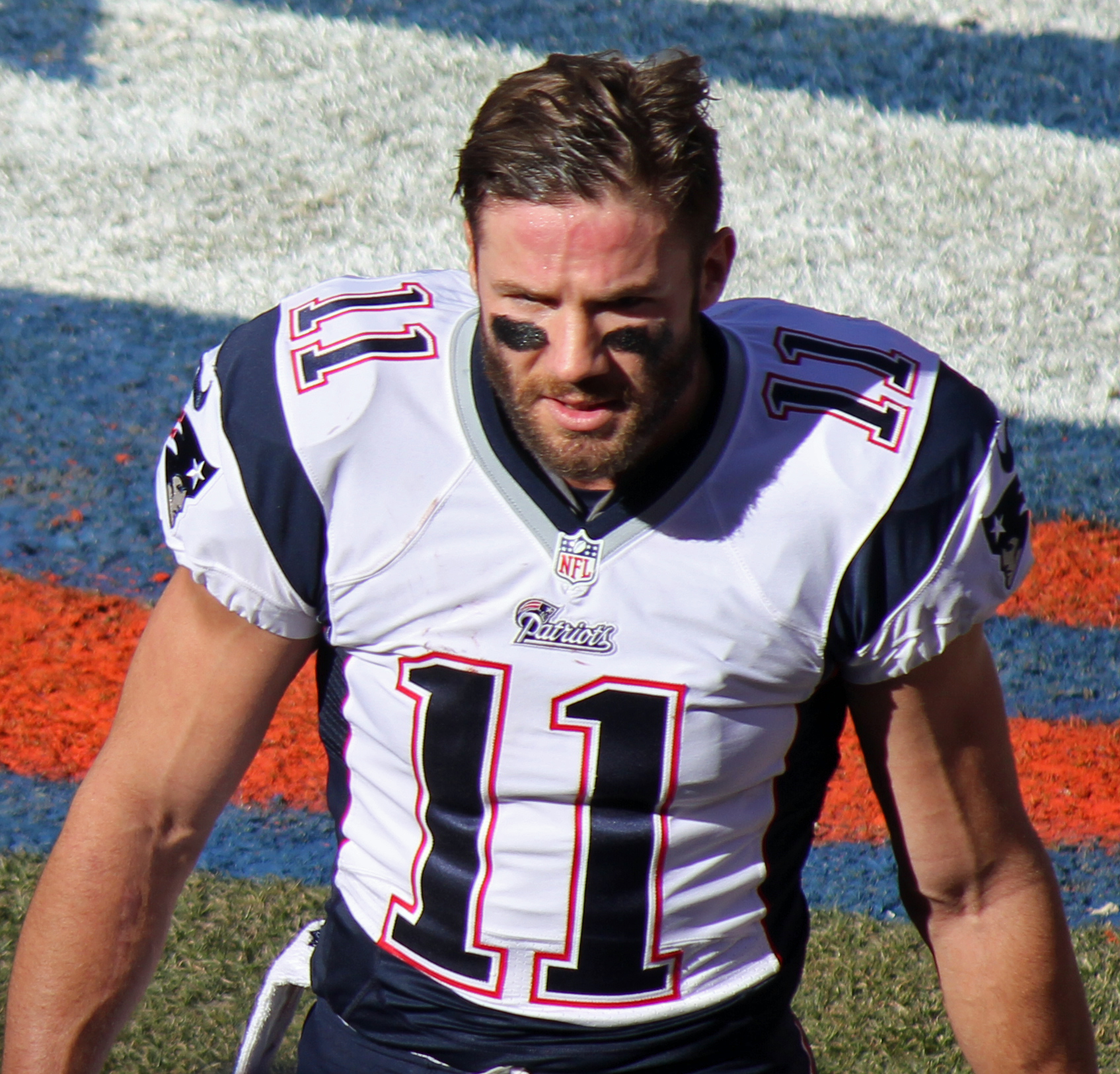
Julian Edelman

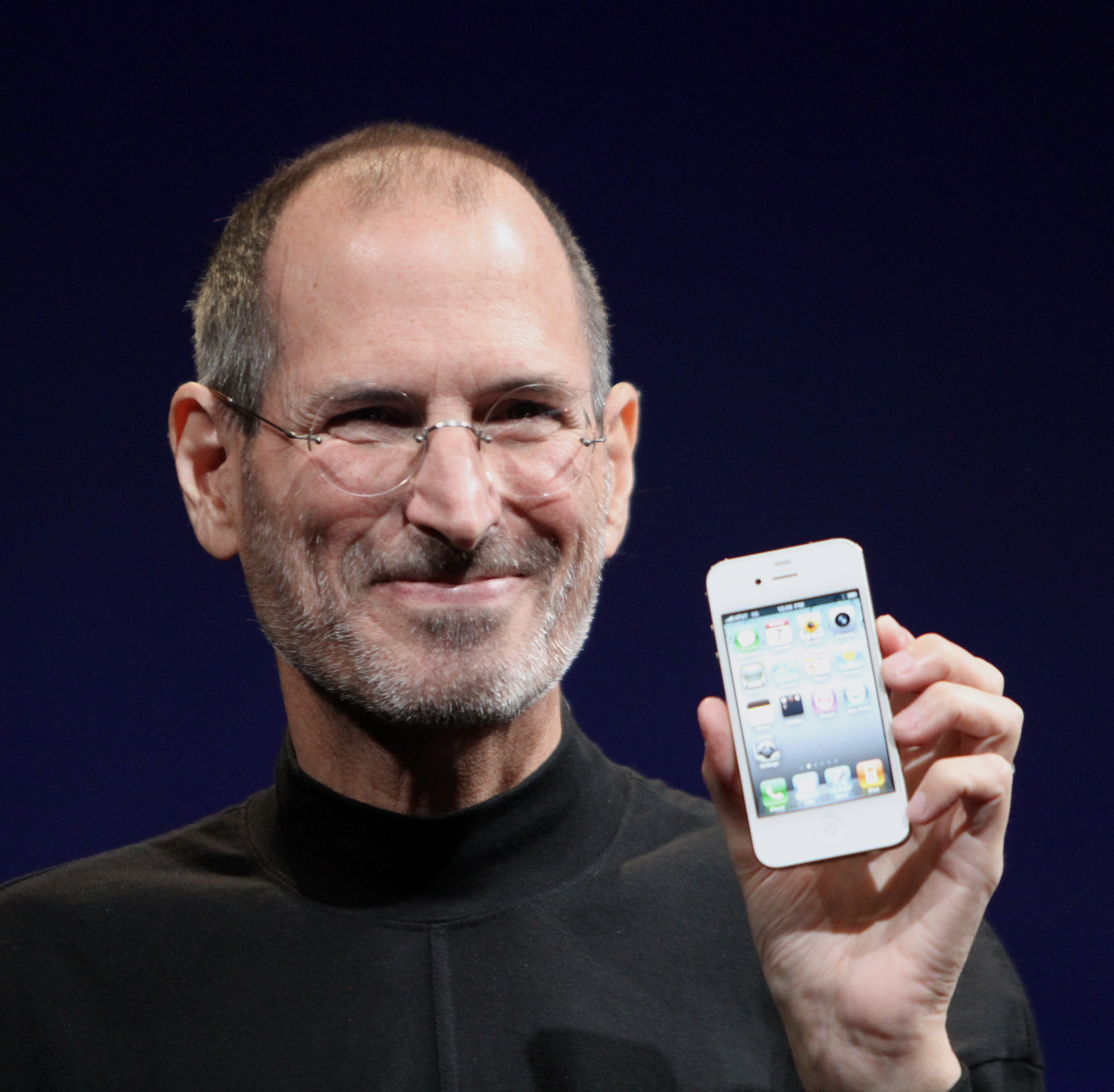
Steve Jobs

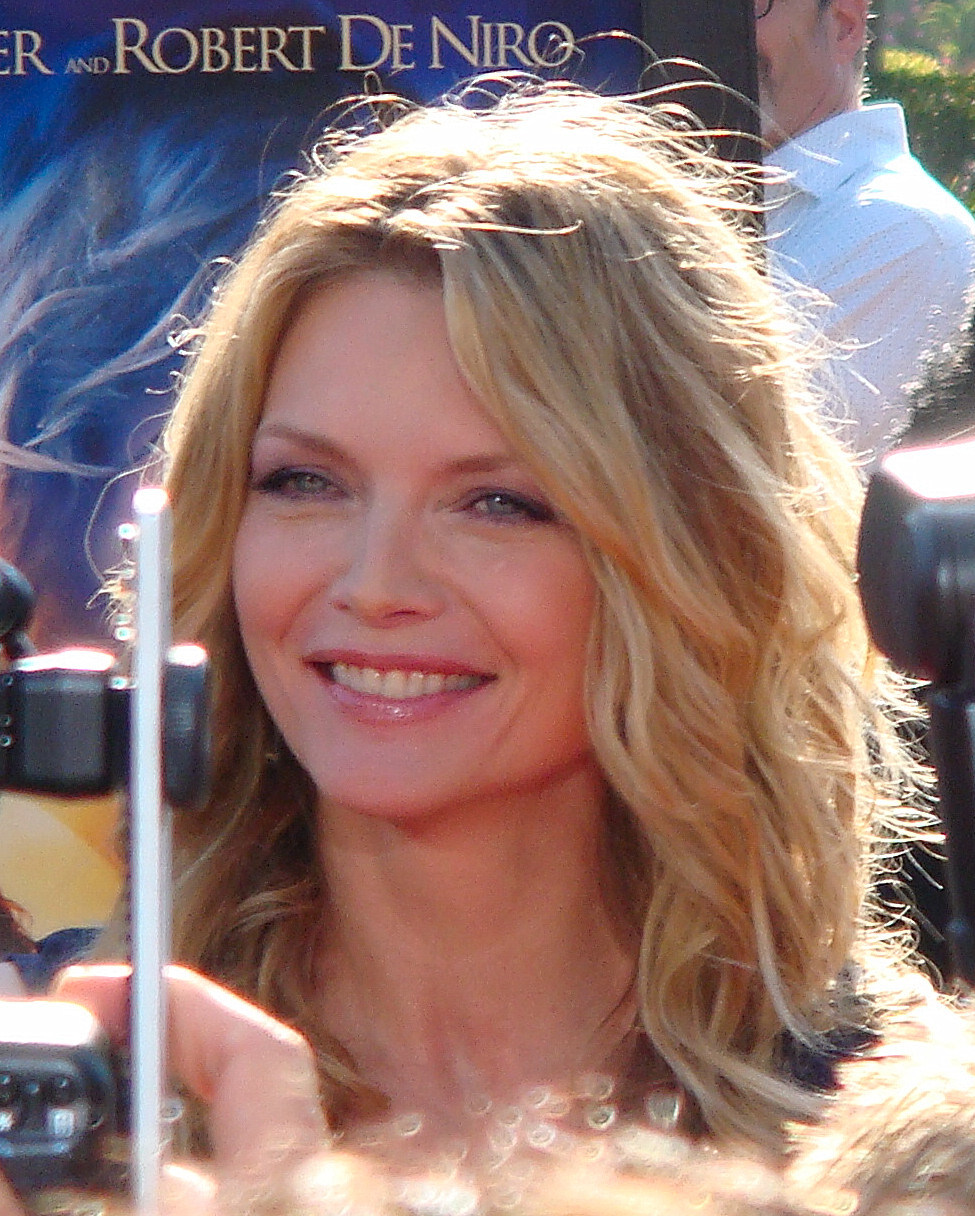
Michelle Pfeiffer

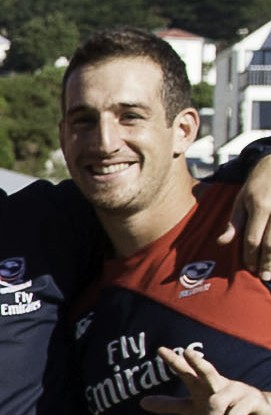
Zack Test

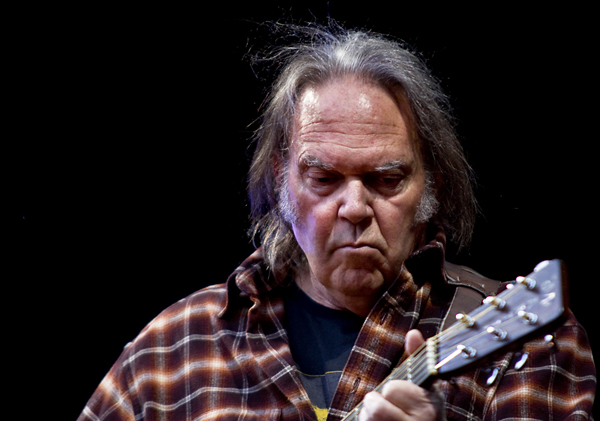
Neil Young

=== Actors and entertainment ===
- Michelle Pfeiffer, actress, and her husband David E. Kelley, television producer
- Shirley Temple Black, child movie star

=== Artists and designers ===
- Frances Baldwin, artist and painter
- Margaret Keane, artist who produced popular paintings of "big eye" waifs, and Walter Keane, her husband, who falsely claimed he had painted them.

=== Business and entrepreneurs ===
- Nolan Bushnell, founder of Atari and Chuck E. Cheese's Pizza-Time Theater
- Scott Cook, co-founder of Intuit, Inc.
- John Doerr, venture capitalist
- Masayoshi Son, founder and CEO of Softbank
- Larry Ellison, CEO of Oracle Corporation, who spent nine years building an architecturally authentic, $200+ million Japanese feudal castle and man-made lake in Woodside;
- Kenneth Fisher, founder of Fisher Investments, Forbes columnist, author, and local historian
- James Folger, coffee magnate
- Kazuo Hirai, CEO of Sony Corporation
- Steve Jobs, co-founder of Apple Inc. owned the Jackling House in Woodside, but had it demolished and was in the process of replacing it with a modern home on the same parcel before his death.
- Mike Markkula, second CEO of Apple Inc.
- Gordon E. Moore, co-founder of Intel and originator of Moore's Law
- Charles R. Schwab, American investor and founder of Charles Schwab Corporation
- Thomas Siebel, founder of Siebel Systems
- Jeffrey Skoll, Canadian internet entrepreneur
- John Thompson, CEO of Symantec
- Nick Woodman, founder and CEO of GoPro

=== Musicians ===
- Joan Baez, folk singer
- Neil Young, rock musician and songwriter, who owns a 1,500 acres (6.1 km^{2}) ranch and recording studio.

=== Scientists ===
- Carl Djerassi, novelist, Stanford professor, and member of team that developed the birth control pill
- Koko, the gorilla who was taught in American Sign Language

=== Sports ===
- Julian Edelman, football player, attended Woodside High School
- Willie McCovey, played nineteen seasons for the San Francisco Giants. McCovey Cove at AT&T Park, and Willie McCovey Field at Woodside Elementary School are named after him.
- Lia Smith, diver, grew up in Woodside
- Zack Test, rugby union player
- Bill Walsh, former San Francisco 49ers head coach and Pro Football Hall of Fame, who died on July 30, 2007.
- Ricky Watters, Former NFL running back
- Joe Lacob, principal owner of the Golden State Warriors of the National Basketball Association (NBA) and the Golden State Valkyries of the Women's National Basketball Association (WNBA).

=== Other ===
- Prince Vasili Alexandrovich of Russia, Russian royalty, nephew of Tsar Nicholas II

== See also ==
- Skeggs Point, California
