= San Carlos High School =

Defunct high school in California, United States

Coordinates: 37.4942°N 122.2733°W

- 2600 Melendy Drive, San Carlos, California 94070; United States

Information
- Type: Public high school
- Opened: 1960
- Closed: 1982
- School district: Sequoia Union High School District
- Grades: 9th-12th grade
- Age range: 13-19
- Enrollment: 1,015 (at founding, September 1960), to 2,500 (at peak, in the late 1960s)
- Colors: Red and White
- Team name: Dons
- Rival: Carlmont High School, Sequoia High School
- Yearbook: El Don

San Carlos High School was a high school operated by the Sequoia Union High School District in San Carlos, California, United States, from 1960 until 1982. Originally founded due to increasing enrollment across Belmont, San Carlos, and Redwood City, by 1982, the high school suffered from low enrollment due to racial protests between local students and students bused in from East Palo Alto, which led the district to close the site. The campus was demolished in 1988, and is today the site of Highlands Park and a subdivision of luxury homes in the San Carlos hills.

== History ==
In the late 1950s, Carlmont High School and Sequoia High School were nearing capacity, even with the recent construction of Woodside High School and Ravenswood High School. To accommodate increasing student numbers in San Carlos and Redwood City, the Sequoia Union High School District developed plans to build a 41-acre campus in the western hills of San Carlos, on lands that formerly belonged to the John Brittan Estate. Geographically, the school drew students from subdivisions in western Redwood City, along with neighborhoods in San Carlos east of Devonshire Boulevard and south of San Carlos Avenue in San Carlos. It was the fourth high school built by the Sequoia Union High School District within a decade.

The acreage for the site cost the district $353,629 and the preparation of the land, mainly grading, cost $699,825. Construction of the first phase of the school was $1,754,000 for a total of $2,483,000. Buildings were designed by San Carlos resident and architect Delp Johnson, who pioneered a radial design of the school, with wings spreading out from a central assembly court that was capable of hosting up to 3,500 people. Johnson also designed several pod-like buildings at Central Middle School, also in San Carlos, with a similar design by the end of the decade. The general contractor for the San Carlos High School project were Williams & Burrows, of Belmont. The school featured a baseball diamond, football field, hockey field, five tennis courts located at the end of Heather Drive, basketball courts, a 40' x 75' swimming pool open to the public during the summer, and a gymnasium. Mr. Philip Maslin was the first principal.

As more and more students grew up with a separation between Carlmont High School, which had formerly enrolled nearly all San Carlos students, and San Carlos High School, a sports rivalry developed between the schools, especially in basketball and track and field. Within the first semester, the student body was tasked with voting for a team name. Among the choices accepted by the faculty, including the Hurricanes, Comets, Falcons, Cardinals, and Dons, the Dons won by eight votes. A Don is a Spanish landowner from the 19th century.

== Student Tension ==
Particularly due to San Carlos' proximity to San Francisco, which had prompted social activism stemming from the Summer of Love, San Carlos High School experienced changes in the early 1970s. In the 1969–1970 school year, students participated in moratoriums, electing to stay home from school every 15th of the month, allegedly in protest of the Vietnam War. Several years later, the Supreme Court ruled on the use of busing to achieve racial integration at schools, bringing change to the student makeup at San Carlos High School, which, due to the composition of San Carlos residents, had been significantly white. Beginning in 1970, 125 African-American students from East Palo Alto were bused into San Carlos, a number that increased each year.

By the mid-1970s, the district was facing declining enrollment, forcing it to close one of its schools. After the district decided to close Ravenswood High School in East Palo Alto, which was heavily African American, 300 students were bused from various neighborhoods in East Palo Alto. Often, bus routes departed these neighborhoods at 6 a.m. to arrive in San Carlos before the start of school. Despite training for teachers on how to accommodate new students, the integration contributed to tension among students and sent shock waves throughout the San Carlos community. In 1976 and 1977, this tension escalated into continual fights between students, leading to police presence on campus and frequent intervention:

"I have vivid memories of the riots. The school was built like a big wagon wheel, like a half circle with a big area in the middle where people could hang out and do activities. One of the activities in the school was called a 'Slave Auction.' Well, we should have thought ahead of time that this term might not be a very polite way to put it, as far as getting along with new people from East Palo Alto. A fight broke out. And eventually, there were a lot of policemen on campus with guns and dogs, and riot gear, and tear gas. But I never saw anyone get shot. I can recall grabbing some kid in a bear huge and hauling him off to the office. There were no real serious injuries, but it was pretty obvious that what we were doing wasn't working real well." — Bill Hayes, teacher at San Carlos High School from 1965 to 1982, as narrated in Linda Wickert Garvey's San Carlos Stories: An Oral History of the City of Good Living

In response, parents and community members began serving as volunteer patrols during the school day, intending to reduce violence and create an environment where students could learn once again. The administration created an annual Diversity Fair with dancers and singers from various cultures, intending to create understanding across different student groups. In succeeding years, the racial tension decreased, allowing space for schoolwide traditions such as the Nude Relay Races. Newspaper articles reported attendance of up to 1,500 students at the annual events, held in the undeveloped hills of San Carlos, the Baylands, and Redwood Shores.

== Closure ==
Despite the closure of Ravenswood High School in 1976, the Sequoia Union High School District, like many other high school districts across the Bay Area, continued to suffer from declining enrollment. San Carlos High School's enrollment, specifically, decreased from its peak of 2,500 in the late 1960s to 1,500 by 1982. After several months of planning and research, on December 15, 1981, District Superintendent Harry Reynolds announced his recommendation to close San Carlos High School. Expectations for which school closure had been mixed in the community, although most expected nearby Sequoia High School or Woodside High School because the centrally located lands were likely more valuable. Reynolds later explained that the considerable distance between East Palo Alto and San Carlos; the school's location on the top of a steep hill that made access difficult; and the less-frequent usage of school grounds by the community compared to other schools contributed to the decision. Other school trustees at the time also noted that the city of Belmont, home to Carlmont High School, had placed a moratorium that prevented the district from putting the land on the market, and that Sequoia, as the founding school of the district, was too historic to close.

The closure of the school was met with significant disapproval from residents and community members, who argued that it was shortsighted to close a 22-year-old school, especially with historic fluctuations in student enrollment. Local newspaper reports from the time described it as one of the "most negative events of the decade," alongside the City of San Carlos' approval of development along Crestview Drive for the first time.

Following the closure of the high school, school boundaries were redrawn, sending approximately 60 percent of San Carlos students to Sequoia High School, and the remaining 40 percent to Carlmont High School. At the time, Sequoia suffered from a negative public perception, particularly due to a significant majority of low-income minority students at the school, historically low test scores, and the appearance of poverty, gangs, and violence. As a result, a local survey documented that, annually, upwards of 40 percent of graduating eighth graders in San Carlos enrolled in private high schools rather than attending Sequoia. Although some realtors and neighborhood listings note that this perception still lingers today, since the early 2000s, Sequoia has undergone efforts to revitalize its image. This was largely due to redistricting that brought more higher-income families to Sequoia and the introduction of the advanced IB curriculum to the school. Today, most students at Central Middle School in San Carlos attend Sequoia, and students at Tierra Linda Middle School attend Carlmont.

== Sale of land and demolition ==
Following the decision to close the school, the Sequoia Union High School District began negotiations with the City of San Carlos for the sale of the land. The district initially offered the land for $11 million, a value that the city quickly dismissed. However, the district realized that, if it could not negotiate with the city, the decision would be put to a vote by San Carlos residents, who were upset with the district and would likely force the land to be sold for very little. Negotiations continued between the district, the city, and property developers for six years. In 1988, the district lowered its price to $5 million, a figure to which the City Council agreed. Within several weeks, the high school was demolished, replaced with 86 homes, currently valued at about $2 million each, and Highlands Park, an 18.9-acre park with large playing fields for soccer, three baseball fields, and lighted tennis courts.

In July 2013, in honor of their 51st anniversary, the Class of 1962 unveiled a bronze plaque adjacent to Highlands Park to honor the former school. Beyond this plaque, the only remnant of the high school is a set of concrete bleachers atop the upper Stadium field at Highlands Park. In 2014, the Sequoia Union High School District, now facing increasing enrollment, began exploring plans to develop San Carlos' Laureola Park into a small magnet high school. Residents and the community rallied around a campaign to save the park from development, which led the district to move on from the site. Ultimately, the district selected a site in Menlo Park for the specialized, technology-focused school, which opened in 2019 as TIDE Academy.

== Notable alumni ==
- Kathryn Bigelow (attended but did not graduate), Academy Award-winning director and writer of The Hurt Locker (2010)
- Keith Comstock (graduated 1973), former MLB player and professional baseball coach
- Jennifer Granholm (graduated 1977); politician, governor of Michigan, 16th United States Secretary of Energy
- James Lay (graduated 1982),: Writer Director, Sound Designer for Brad Pitt.

web|url=https://www.imdb.com/name/nm0493468/

- Mike McCurry (attended 1969–1971); former press secretary in Bill Clinton's administration
- James Oseland (attended 1977–1979); author, editor and television personality
- Greg Proops (graduated 1977), comedian
- Mark Ulriksen (graduated 1976), painter and magazine illustrator
- Rex J. Walheim (graduated 1980); NASA astronaut on three Space Shuttle missions, STS-110, STS-122 and the final one, STS-135

== See also ==
- List of closed secondary schools in California
- Sequoia Union High School District
