= SCOOT (bus service) =

San Carlos Optimum Operational Transit

Overview
- Owner: City of San Carlos
- Locale: San Carlos
- Transit type: Bus
- Number of lines: 9
- Daily ridership: 600 (monthly ridership: 19,000 in 2004)
- Headquarters: San Carlos City Hall, 600 Elm Street, San Carlos

Operation
- Began operation: 2002
- Ended operation: June 17, 2005
- Operator: Standard Parking

San Carlos Optimum Operational Transit, frequently abbreviated as SCOOT and stylized as S.C.O.O.T., was a free, On-Demand, shuttle bus service that operated in San Carlos, California, between 2002 and 2005. It was intended to assist local residents, especially those living in the San Carlos hills, with errands, commutes to school and work, and access to other sites in the city. In addition to 9 fixed bus routes, SCOOT operated a service in which passengers could request a pick-up and drop-off site anywhere in the city, operating almost as a shared taxi. Although the service was popular for 3 years, with monthly ridership reaching 19,000 passengers, San Carlos voters rejected a parcel tax that placed the entire financial burden of the service on property owners. With insufficient funding, the program was dismantled on June 17, 2005.

== Operations ==
In mid-2002, the City of San Carlos introduced a pilot program for residents with two shuttle buses. In addition to providing service to neighborhoods in the San Carlos hills, which were geographically isolated from most of the city's services, the buses were intended to be used by local schoolchildren. Two years earlier, in September 2000, San Carlos reopened Tierra Linda Middle School without a traditional school bus service, and SCOOT was thought to fill a local need. Rides were free for passengers.

By 2003, the program had increased its popularity, and the city agreed to fund a longer pilot of the program, through 2005. Additional routes were added to provide service to other local schools, in addition to services like the San Carlos Youth Center, the city's Caltrain station, and downtown San Carlos. In 2004, City Council members agreed to a $616,000 contract with Standard Parking to provide additional buses within the city, bringing SCOOT's fleet to 9 buses. Monthly ridership averaged 19,000 passengers. The routes were seen as too small for SamTrans to consider, but too big for the City of San Carlos to ignore. (Notably, in this time period, SamTrans continued to operate two fixed bus routes, including route 261 through the San Carlos hills and route 63 in the flatlands of San Carlos for local students.)

=== Name ===
SCOOT stood for San Carlos Optimum Operational Transit, although most buses and schedules printed the service's name as SCOOT or S.C.O.O.T. alone. According to local news reports, staff at the San Carlos Youth Center developed the name prior to its pilot. They knew they wanted to include "San Carlos" and "transit" in the name, and liked the sound of "SCOOT," so used a dictionary to come up with the remaining two words.

== Routes ==
=== Fixed Bus Routes ===
As SCOOT became more popular, various routes were added to the service, operating during morning and afternoon commute hours. Local residents could petition the city for routes to provide service to schools. During special events, SCOOT also added special weekend services, such as trips to farmers' markets in downtown San Carlos, local festivals, and events at the Hiller Aviation Museum. Each ride was free. By the program's end, there were 9 routes:

Route	Terminals		Route/Locations served	Links
1 (Red)	Tierra Linda Middle School	Chestnut Street and Magnolia Avenue	Arguello Park, Arundel Elementary School, Hillcrest Park	Route Map (PDF)
2 (Yellow)	Shelford Avenue and Williams Lane	Arundel Elementary School	Arundel Elementary School, Arguello Park, Tierra Linda Middle School, City Hall, Library	Route Map (PDF)
3 (Purple)	Arundel Elementary School	Highlands Park (Melendy Drive and Hewitt Drive)	Arundel Elementary School, Tierra Linda Middle School, Devonshire/Windsor neighborhoods, Heather Elementary School, Highlands Park	Route Map (PDF)
4 (Green)	Arundel Elementary School	Arroyo Avenue and Orange Avenue	Arundel Elementary School, Tierra Linda Middle School, Heather Elementary School, Brittan Avenue, Brittan Acres Elementary School	Route Map (PDF)
5 (Gray)	Tierra Linda Middle School	Alameda de las Pulgas and Hill Way	Tierra Linda Middle School, Arundel Elementary School, Central Middle School, Burton Park, Brittan Park neighborhood, White Oaks Elementary School, White Oaks neighborhood	Route Map (PDF)
6 (Orange)	Tierra Linda Middle School	Old County Road and Inverness Drive	Tierra Linda Middle School, St. Charles Church and School, Brittan Acres Elementary School, Brittan Park neighborhood, Central Middle School, San Carlos station, East San Carlos	Route Map (PDF)
7 (Pink)	Crestview Drive and Club Drive	Loma Road and Whitman Court	Club Drive, Tierra Linda Middle School, San Carlos Avenue, Alameda de las Pulgas, Melendy Drive, Heather Elementary School, Crestview neighborhood	Route Map (PDF)
8 (Black)	Brittan Acres Elementary School	El Camino Real and Arroyo Avenue	Brittan Acres Elementary School, Central Middle School, Burton Park, Brittan Park neighborhood, White Oaks Elementary School, White Oaks neighborhood, El Camino Real	Route Map (PDF)
9 (Blue)	Brittan Acres Elementary School	Baytree Road and Woodland Avenue	Brittan Acres Elementary School, Central Middle School, Burton Park, Brittan Park neighborhood, Belmont Avenue	Route Map (PDF)

=== On-Demand Shuttle Routes ===
In early months, SCOOT acted as a taxi service, where passengers could call and get picked up in a few minutes. Due to SCOOT's increasing popularity, however, it became necessary for residents to make reservations at least a day in advance. The City employed Kimberly Harbert as a part-time Outreach Coordinator, who was required worked to group reservations and plan out routes for drivers, increasing the service's efficiency. Some riders set up regular pick-up and drop-off times, such as those who used the service to reach the local Caltrain station from their home.

The on-demand service operated from 6 a.m. to 7 p.m. on weekdays, and was noted for its punctuality. SCOOT received two state awards during its operations.

== Funding ==
Throughout its operation, SCOOT struggled to find a stable source of funding. Ultimately, the program cost the city about $700,000 a year, which was supported by grants and money raised from Measure A that otherwise would have gone to street repairs. City officials considered options such as charging for rides and using sales tax money set aside for transportation issues. The city also collected fees from developers, which was added to a general transportation fund. On weekends and at other times when SCOOT was not in regular service, buses could be rented by local groups, the profit from which would be put back into the service.

In 2004, a task force made up of community members was established, to explore proposed changes to the service and potential sources of funding. In general, the city looked to sign new contracts for the program's operations, hoping to reduce the cost, but also considered the possibility of reducing routes. In general, community members seemed willing to pay for a nominal fee to use the service.

As the three-year-long pilot program was nearing its end, and deferrals from Measure A funds to street repairs could not be put off forever, the city placed a bond measure on a special election in March 2005. The bond was listed as Measure T, which would have added a $59 parcel tax to support the program through 2010, placing 100 percent of the financial burden on property owners. Opponents argued that the ridership, which by February 2005 was noted as 15,000 passengers, was far lower in reality, and that the program was far too expensive.

Measure T needed two-thirds support to pass, yet received only 3,199 "yes" votes, compared to 3,948 "no" votes. A week later, San Carlos Mayor Inge Tiegel Doherty passed $450,000 worth of mid-year budget cuts, including cuts to SCOOT. The city continued to fund the service through the end of the 2004–2005 school year as a transition period to give parents, commuters, and other residents time to find alternative modes of transportation.

== End of service ==
In 2010, then-San Carlos Vice Mayor Bob Grassili announced his intention to investigate bringing back SCOOT, especially to bring transportation access to residents and to ease congestion around Carlmont High School and Tierra Linda. At the time, however, the town faced a serious budget shortfall, independent of SCOOT, so the project gained little traction.

In January 2015, the city opened a formal discussion of an independent shuttle service in the town. In an online survey of 29 residents, approximately 76 percent said that a city-wide shuttle service would be "valuable" to San Carlos, and most respondents were willing to pay for the service, either in a revenue measure, pay-per-ride, or both. In contrast to original SCOOT routes, most respondents expected to use the service to reach downtown from home, rather than local schools.

However, despite the survey results and other attempts, since SCOOT, there has been no San Carlos-specific bus service. In recent years, however, SamTrans has added two school-day only routes in San Carlos, primarily in the western hills and serving Tierra Linda Middle School, much like several of SCOOT's original routes. An estimated 100 students use these SamTrans routes each school day.

== See also ==
- San Carlos, California
- SamTrans
