= Central Middle School (San Carlos, California) =

Location
- 757 Cedar Street, San Carlos, California 94070 United States (formerly 826 and 828 Chestnut Street, San Carlos)
- 37°30′03″N 122°15′42″W

Information
- Type: Public middle school
- Established: 1930
- School district: San Carlos School District
- Superintendent: Jennifer Frentress
- NCES School ID: 063429005402
- Principal: Thomas Domer (2015–present)
- Faculty: Colyn Fischer, Tom Petithomme (former)
- Key people: Heidi Mickelsen (Assistant Principal, 2022–present), Steven Kaufman (former Principal, 2011–2016), Lynette Hovland (former Principal, 2006–2011)
- Grades: 6th-8th grade
- Age range: 11-14
- Enrollment: 416 (2021–22)
- Student to teacher ratio: 20:1
- Colors: Green and White
- Mascot: Mustangs
- Rival: Tierra Linda Middle School
- Yearbook: Hoofprints
- Website: Official website

Central Middle School is a middle school in San Carlos, California, United States, established in 1930. It was originally founded as the city's first school, with grades K–8, although since August 2016, it has served students in grades 6–8 only. The campus underwent a major remodel in 2015, yet still includes an auditorium designed by the Works Progress Administration in 1939, which is home to the biennial Chickens' Ball variety show, the longest-running PTA fundraiser in the United States.

== About ==
Central Middle School, locally referred to as "CMS," is part of the San Carlos Elementary School District, and today serves students in grades 6–8. Most students attend elementary school at Brittan Acres Elementary or White Oaks Elementary in San Carlos, both of which feed into Arroyo Upper Elementary School, a school for grades 4–5 that feeds directly into Central. After graduation, most students are geographically slotted to attend Sequoia High School, although some students choose to attend other schools within the Sequoia Union High School District or a nearby private school. The school maintains several after-school sports teams and an award-winning Band and Orchestra program, in addition to a Yearbook team and student government team.

Most Central students pursue courses in six main subject areas: Language Arts, Social Studies, Mathematics, Science, Physical Education, and an Elective. Families have a choice in the student's math and elective course, but classes are otherwise pre-determined. The school has operated a modified block schedule since the 2016–2017 school year, under which students attend half their classes on Wednesday and the other half on Thursday. Like at other San Carlos schools, Wednesdays are early-dismissal days.

== History ==
=== 1916–1930s: Beginnings ===
After the creation of the San Carlos School District in 1916, classes for local students was held at a house, and then a one-building school, at the corner of San Carlos Avenue and Elm Street, where City Hall is located today. As the local population grew, a school bond was issued, allowing for the construction of a new school, named Central School, at 826 Chestnut Street. The concrete school building featured six classrooms and two classrooms used as an auditorium and cost $37,000 to construct. It was designed by San Francisco architect Col. E. L. Norberg, who also developed the nearby Burlingame Library and San Mateo High School.

In 1939, through funding from the Federal Emergency Administration, local school trustees added an additional auditorium at the north end of the school building, which today is known as Mustang Hall. Architects Thomas M. Edwards and Harry A. Schary developed the auditorium, which included a stage and dressing rooms, two classrooms, a kindergarten, and a clinic. To accommodate more students, seven grammar school classrooms were constructed at the south end of the building in 1941 by architects Birge Clark and David Clark. One year later, on a block of land on the east side of Chestnut Street, which then ran continuously through the property, six primary school classrooms were developed.

Beyond the 1939 auditorium, this set of classrooms, officially referred to as "Unit B," are the oldest remaining buildings on the site, although the interiors were remodeled in 2015 when the classrooms began to be used by Arroyo Upper Elementary School. The exterior walls of these classrooms became known among San Carlos residents for their Beatles-themed murals, painted by students in the early 2000s under the supervision of former Art teacher Joan Purcell.

=== 1940s–1970s: Growth as a Middle School ===
Between 1944 and 1956, the District responded to increasing student populations by constructing several elementary schools, plus Tierra Linda Middle School, and the now-closed San Carlos High School. As a result, Central became a junior high school serving students in grades 5–8. Several renovations to the campus were completed during this time, including a row of classrooms with courtyards on the campus' east side in the 1940s.

In 1959, in preparation for the construction of a third school building, the District and the City of San Carlos collaborated to close a portion of Chestnut Street, which still today remains closed between School Street and Arroyo Avenue. In addition to the campus now encompassing the 1942 buildings formerly across Chestnut Street, local architect Delp W. Johnson designed an 8-room building in the center of campus and the library. He also renovated a portion of Mustang Hall to house the District office, and expanded the Mustang Hall building to include boys and girls locker rooms. These "Unit C" additions, completed in 1960, are still in use in their original locations today, although the District offices have now been repurposed to house a youth community theater organization and the eight rooms now make up Arroyo Upper Elementary School, which shares Central's original campus. Harrod and Williams of Sunnyvale served as the project contractors. In 1970, Johnson's firm, Delp W. Johnson, Poole, and Storm, designed four octagonal "pod" buildings with exterior doors leading to open-air hallways and interior doors connecting to a study and storage room. This style was also seen at San Carlos High School, developed by Johnson in the previous decade. Among these, only two pods still remain today; one houses the school's Band, Orchestra, and Library rooms ("Unit D"), and the other is used as the offices of a community tutoring organization and the local education foundation ("Unit F"). Units E and G were used as a set of classrooms and the teacher's lounge, respectively, between 1970 and the school's reconstruction in 2015. At the same time, the original school building of 1930 and the 1941 south-end addition were both demolished, as they were found to be seismically unsafe. De Narde Construction Company of San Francisco served as the project contractors. During this renovation, the school's offices were moved to a pod building along Chestnut Street, and the school's address was officially signed as 828 Chestnut Street.

=== 1980s–2000s: Carrying On Traditions ===
As Central celebrated its 50th anniversary in 1980, traditions such as the annual Chickens' Ball variety show and the gathering of students in downtown San Carlos had become commonplace among Central students. Local newspapers reported that students could be found at the Burton Park amphitheater, now home to the San Carlos Youth Center, or along the Postman's Path, a now-closed easement between Cedar Street and Carmelita Drive.

Elsewhere in the city and county, schools were experiencing decreased enrollment, which led to the closure of Tierra Linda Middle School in 1982. Elementary schools were once again home to K–6 students, and all seventh and eighth grade San Carlos students were slotted to attend Central. With decreased funding, cuts were made to Central's academic offerings, including reduced music and art classes. In 1984, Chickens' Ball ticket sales allowed for the purchase of $12,500 worth of personal computers and computer-related programs for Central students.

By 1985, school consultants predicted increased enrollment in San Carlos schools, causing school trustees to move sixth graders back to Central and open six portable classrooms on the west side of campus. In 1988, San Carlos resident Monica MacLean, known for her roles in Demon Seed and The Paper Chase, co-founded the San Carlos Children's Theater, a performing arts group, which brought acting classes to Central Middle School's range of electives. Since the opening of the San Carlos Youth Center at Burton Park in the late 1990s, many students have trekked across Arroyo Avenue to the Youth Center after school for sports, homework help, and arts and crafts.

By the 1990s, the San Carlos School District proposed reopening Tierra Linda and reorganizing both Central and Tierra Linda as plants for students in grades 5–8. In June 1997, a bond measure was passed to allow the funding of a new gym and library on both campuses, in addition to upgrades classrooms for art, the performing arts, and science. This led to the construction of a 8,598-square-foot gymnasium on the north end of Central's campus, completed in 1998, which replaced an existing one-story wood frame building on the site. On September 5, 2000, Tierra Linda officially reopened as San Carlos' second middle school. The portables constructed on campus in 1985 soon came to be used primarily as fifth grade classrooms, in addition to a design lab and a Shakespeare-themed elective. Several years later, the historic North Hall, today known as Mustang Hall, underwent renovations, including new boys and girls locker rooms, a kitchen, and a multi-purpose room.

=== 2014–present: Renovation and Restructuring ===
In the early 2010s, the San Carlos School District experienced an influx of students, leading the School Board to adopt a policy to divide its two school levels (grades K–4 and grades 5–8) into three levels: grades K–3 elementary schools, grades 4–5 upper elementary "bridge" schools, and grades 6–8 middle schools. The District split Central's campus into two schools: Central's current 6-8 school and Arroyo Upper Elementary School. The project was valued at $37.5 million total and financed through the Measure H Facility Bond Program, passed in November 2012 by San Carlos voters.

Over the course of 14 months, San Carlos construction company Blach Construction and Santa Rosa-based Quattrocchi Kwok Architects built a 2-story, 40,000-square-foot addition to Central's campus, comprising academic classrooms, a staff lounge, and a new office. Lower-level atriums were fitted with movable furniture to enable rearrangeable groupings. The 22 new classrooms were named "Learning Suites" in construction plans, referring to the fact that classrooms were built in pairs, with a moveable whiteboard partition in between each and shared breakout spaces. Four modernized science labs, an art room, and a "Tinker Lab," currently used by Central's Maker Space elective, were added to the campus, in addition to large Apple TV screens used for projection in each classroom.

The construction was completed in August 2015. Beginning with the 2015–2016 school year, the majority of Central's academic classes were held in the renovated buildings, ending the use of existing portables and octagonal pods. However, the school's library, media production room, and Band and Orchestra rooms still remain in the older wing of the school. During the renovation, the Orchestra room was modernized and the Band room was modernized and expanded, incorporating a former computer lab. No changes were made to Mustang Hall.

Today, much of Arroyo Upper Elementary School, which opened in August 2016, consists of Central Middle School's former classrooms. The district office, which once sat on the north end of Central's campus, moved to its present-day location on Industrial Road in San Carlos during the construction. The current entrance to Central is located on Cedar Street, adjacent to a parking lot constructed during the renovation. The school's gymnasium was sanded and refinished in advance of the 2022–2023 school year.

== Mustang Hall ==
In addition to being used as an indoor space for P.E. and theater classes, Central's historic auditorium, Mustang Hall, is used for community events including theater performances and the biennial Chickens' Ball variety show. Central and Arroyo Band and Orchestra concerts are also held annually in Mustang Hall. The building was constructed in 1939 with workers from the Works Progress Administration, and the architecture exemplifies characteristics of the Art Deco style, with influences from the Mission Revival period. In particular, the auditorium is known for its terra cotta tile roof, stucco wall finish, gable roofs, and chevron-patterned tiles. The auditorium was officially named Mustang Hall in 2007.

The same year that the auditorium was created, San Carlos teacher Howard Demeke, recognizing the need to raise "milk money" for local students, developed a plan to create a friendly skit competition amongst community members. He developed the skits into a two-hour-long variety show, known as the Chickens' Ball, which has run every other year since. The cast of volunteers dress in clothing from the 1890s period, and skit themes are known to be raucous and risqué, such as the 2012 performance's theme of Barbary Coast, a historic red-light district of San Francisco. In March 2020, the show was conducted online for the first time due to the COVID-19 pandemic. Due to low funding, particularly in the San Carlos School District, 75 percent of the district's funding comes from local sources, such as the Chickens' Ball. Funds raised from ticket sales support music, theater, and performing arts programs at all the local San Carlos schools; in previous years, a mural, a ceramics class, art supplies, and new instrument purchases have been funded from proceeds of the event.

== Electives and Programs ==
=== Academic Offerings ===
Academically, Central has experienced changes to its electives and schedule in recent years. Students can choose between electives including Band and Orchestra, Spanish, Art, Video Media, and more. In some years, a rotating wheel of electives are offered to sixth graders, which in the past included Spanish, Music Appreciation, and Shakespeare. Through the 2013–2014 school year, Yearbook was offered as an elective; it was switched to an after-school club through June 2021, after which production has been done by students in a combined video production and Yearbook elective, Multimedia.

Beginning in the 2016–2017 school year, on Tuesday afternoons students participate in "Quest" classes, enabling them to choose between programs including socio-emotional support, student government, advanced math challenges, reading clubs, and more. In August 2022, the program was renamed "Advisory" and fills a 45-minute space on Thursday mornings. For several years, Jazz Band, Art, and P.E. were offered during zero period and as of the 2023-2024 school year symphony orchestra was added, which began at 7:30 a.m., 7:40 a.m., and today 7:45 a.m.

Through the 2014–2015 school year, a cohort of Central students were enrolled annually in a College and Career Readiness (CCR) class, helping to encourage students to develop skills to attend a university after graduation. Students enrolled in the program were often the first in their families to attend college, or came from backgrounds underrepresented in higher education, and curriculum was provided by the Advancement Via Individual Determination (AVID) program. Due to low enrollment, the program ended in June 2015.

=== Sports and Extracurricular Activities ===
Sports are organized by the San Carlos School District, and include school-specific teams including basketball, volleyball, tennis, and more. Golf, cross country, track and field, and flag football are offered to all San Carlos middle school students, who play together on the same team. Central's campus includes a gymnasium which is used for basketball and volleyball games. Other events are held offsite, including tennis matches and soccer games at Crestveiw Park in San Carlos. Each January, middle school students can participate in the annual Swing Off, a swing dancing competition hosted by either Central or Tierra Linda. Central is part of the Art David Athletic League.

Alongside students at Tierra Linda Middle School and San Carlos Charter Learning Center, Central students have the opportunity to participate in an annual Tri-School Musical, directed by the San Carlos Children's Theater, which takes place over two weekends each fall inside Mustang Hall. Additionally, seventh grade students travel to Crane Flat and Curry Village inside Yosemite National Park for a week each May for an environmental education field trip organized by NatureBridge. As part of the San Carlos School District's project-based learning curriculum, sixth and eighth graders at Central are encouraged to complete an independent enrichment project, as part of an annual ROPES (Rite Of Passage ExperienceS program) experience. All Central students can also develop an individual or group project for the district's Science Fair, from which several students regularly advance to the county level Science Fair.

=== Newscast ===
In August 2015, Central debuted a weekly news broadcast show developed by Nicolas Lamb, featuring regular student anchors, interviews with other students and community members, and weekly segments such as a weather report, "5 Seconds of Fame" starring students, a teacher lip sync, and "Selfies of the Week." Students developed skills in video production and photography as part of the club, which met weekly after school. As the program was one of the first of its kind for middle schools in the Bay Area, several students involved in the program were featured on KRON-4 News in December 2016 for their work. The newscast is now done several times throughout the school year, in contrast to the original program, which featured episodes each Monday that would be broadcast to TV screens in each classroom. Over the past 6 years, the broadcast has changed names, including CMSTV, CMS News, CMS Central, Mustang Todays, and, most recently, Mustang Mornings.

== Statistics ==
=== Demographics ===
Population by grade level:
	2017–2018	2018–2019	2019–2020	2020–2021	2021–2022
Grade 6 (%)	176 (31.8%)	169 (32.6%)	153 (30.5%)	131 (29.2%)	138 (33.2%)
Grade 7 (%)	175 (31.6%)	179 (34.6%)	172 (34.3%)	151 (33.7%)	128 (30.8%)
Grade 8 (%)	202 (36.5%)	170 (32.8%)	176 (35.1%)	166 (37.1%)	150 (36.1%)
Total	553	518	501	448	416

Population of racial identities by number of students:
	2017–2018	2018–2019	2019–2020	2020–2021	2021–2022
White	364	347	322	275	257
Hispanic	79	69	81	74	67
Asian	49	45	46	44	48
African American	3	5	4	3	0
Pacific Islander	1	0	0	1	1
American Indian	1	0	0	0	0
Two or More Races	56	52	48	51	43
Total	553	518	501	448	416

Population of racial identities by percent of enrollment:
	2017–2018	2018–2019	2019–2020	2020–2021	2021–2022
White	65.8%	67.0%	64.3%	61.4%	61.8%
Hispanic	14.3%	13.3%	16.2%	16.5%	16.1%
Asian	8.9%	8.7%	9.2%	9.8%	11.5%
African American	0.5%	1.0%	0.8%	0.7%	0.0%
Pacific Islander	0.2%	0.0%	0.0%	0.2%	0.2%
American Indian	0.2%	0.0%	0.0%	0.0%	0.0%
Two or More Races	10.1%	10.0%	9.6%	11.4%	10.3%

Other data:
	2017–2018	2018–2019	2019–2020	2020–2021	2021–2022
English language learners	17 (3.1%)	24 (4.6%)	12 (2.4%)	11 (2.5%)	11 (2.6%)
Foster youth	0 (0.0%)	0 (0.0%)	0 (0.0%)	<1.0%	0 (0.0%)
Receive special education services	57 (10.3%)	50 (9.7%)	No Data	46 (9.2%)	39 (8.7%)
Eligible for free and reduced-price lunch	31 (5.6%)	26 (5.0%)	0.8%	25 (5.0%)	33 (7.4%)

== Notable faculty ==
- Colyn Fischer (2009–present) – Orchestra
- Tom Petithomme (2013–2017) – P.E.

== Notable alumni ==
- Emma Chamberlain (2012–2015)

== External links section ==
- Official website
