= San Carlos School District =

School district in California, United States

San Carlos Elementary School District

Address
- 1200 Industrial Road, Unit 9 San Carlos, San Mateo County, California; United States

District information
- Type: Public school district
- Grades: K-8
- Established: 1916; 109 years ago
- Superintendent: Jennifer Frentress
- NCES District ID: 0634290

Students and staff
- Students: 2,626 (as of 2021–2022 school year)
- Staff: 152.36
- Student–teacher ratio: 20.08

Other information
- Website: https://scsdk8.org

San Carlos School District is a K-8 elementary school district in San Carlos, California. It consists of 2 middle schools, 4 lower elementary schools, 2 upper elementary schools, and 1 K-8 charter school, which holds the distinction of being the first charter school in California and the second in the nation. The District currently serves more than 2,600 students. After graduating from 8th grade, students typically go on to the Sequoia Union High School District, and most often to Sequoia High School or Carlmont High School.

== Schools ==
Middle Schools (grades 6–8):

- Central Middle School, founded in 1930
- Tierra Linda Middle School, founded in 1953

Lower Elementary Schools (grades K–3):

- Arundel School, founded in 1949
- Brittan Acres School, founded in 1952
- Heather School, founded in 1963
- White Oaks School, founded in 1945
- Laureola School, founded in 1951 and closed in 1978 due to low enrollment (today the site of Laureola Park)

Upper Elementary Schools (grades 4–5):

- Arroyo School, founded in 2016
- Mariposa School, founded in 2018

Charter Schools (grades K–8):

- San Carlos Charter Learning Center, founded in 1994

In addition, the school district runs a Transitional Kindergarten program and preschool program at many of its sites.

Facing increasing enrollment in the early 2010s, the District laid plans to develop two upper elementary "bridge" schools on its middle school campuses. Former Central Middle School classrooms were renovated to be used at Arroyo School, and Tierra Linda's classrooms were converted into Mariposa School.

== History ==
As San Carlos experienced growth after the 1906 San Francisco earthquake, residents petitioned the County Supervisors for a new school. The San Carlos School District was established in 1916, geographically carved from the Belmont School District, Redwood City School District, and now-defunct West Union School District. For two years, classes were held in a house at the corner of San Carlos Avenue and Elm Street, where City Hall is located today. Gertrude Hind, a graduate of San Francisco Teacher's College, taught twenty students in eight grades.

San Carlos voters narrowly approved a District plan to construct a new, $11,000 school at the site, allowing space for four classrooms. The school's auditorium housed social events for the community, organized by town founder and real estate developer Fred Drake. In the late 1920s, the City of San Carlos purchased the lot for $26,000 to be used for City Hall. Although the rooms were repurposed, the building remained mostly unchanged until its demolition (and new construction) in 1967.

The school was moved to 826 Chestnut Street, renamed Central Elementary School, and opened on September 20, 1930, serving students from kindergarten to eighth grade. Although the address of the school changed to 828 Chestnut Street and 757 Cedar Street, the present-day Central Middle School remains on the same campus.

Gradually, as the number of families in San Carlos increased following the end of World War II, more classrooms were needed. Enrollment grew from 394 in 1940 to 2,249 by 1949, gradually climbing to more than 3,000 in the fall of 1960. Several schools were developed, the first of which was White Oaks Elementary School, constructed in 1945 to serve students grades K–4. The District appointed a Superintendent to oversee the growth, a role first held by Clark Robinson, then Ruth Melendy and Albert Beardsley. Eleanor Thronson, a registered nurse, served San Carlos schools from December 1926 to June 1965.

Curriculum in early years was "traditional," with a heavy emphasis on reading, writing, and mathematics. With growing populations in the western hills, geographic boundaries shifted to reduce overcrowding. In the 1950s and 1960s, the District developed a reputation for well-educated teachers, a feature advertised in home sales. The District office remained on the Central Elementary School (today, Central Middle School) campus until 2014, when campus renovation and expansion led to the office being transferred to its current-day location on Industrial Road in San Carlos.

In recent years, the District has suffered from declining enrollment, a statistic that has been attributed to the rising cost of living locally and some San Carlos families opting for private schools instead of public schools. Before the COVID-19 pandemic, the District predicted that its population would stabilize, estimating 2,970 students in the 2020–2021 school year and 2,918 students in the 2021–2022 school year. Instead, as the COVID-19 pandemic accelerated families' transitions outside of San Carlos and outside of public schools, enrollment came in short by nearly 300 students in the 2021–2022 school year.

== Governance ==
Superintendent

- Jennifer Frentress (2021–)
  - Formerly Michelle Harmeier (2018–2021, 3 school years)
  - Formerly Mary Jude Doerpinghaus as Interim Superintendent (2017–2018, 1 school year)
  - Formerly Craig Baker (2009–2017, 8 school years)
  - Formerly Steven Mitrovich (2007–2009, 2 school years)
  - Formerly Patricia Wool (2000–2007, 7 school years)
  - Formerly Don Shalvey (1992–1998, 6 school years)

School Board

- Sarah Cassanego
- Eirene Chen
- Wendy Dougherty
- Carol Elliott
- Neil Layton

== See also ==
- San Carlos, California
- Sequoia Union High School District
