= Folau =

Folau is a Tongan surname. People with that name include:

- Israel Folau (born 1989), Australian professional rugby footballer
- Maria Folau (nee Tuta'ia ) (born 1987) wife of Israel Folau
- Spencer Folau (born 1973), Tongan American football player
- Folau Fainga'a (born 1995), Australian rugby union player
