= Episcopal Church of the Epiphany of San Carlos, California =

Coordinates: 37.498°N 122.260°W

The Episcopal Church of the Epiphany of San Carlos, California, is a parish in the Episcopal Diocese of California, and part of the Episcopal Church in the United States of America (ECUSA). Within its community, the parish is normally referred to as simply The Church of the Epiphany.

== Location ==
The church building and parish hall are located at 1839 Arroyo Avenue, San Carlos, California, at the corner of Cedar Street and Arroyo Avenue. This is a residential area, across from a large city park, Burton Park. On some Sundays, such as Palm Sunday, the 10 am service may start in the park and proceed into the church.

== Outreach and service ==
The Church of the Epiphany has active outreach and service activities within its own parish, within the San Francisco Bay Area, the United States, and internationally. There are too many such activities, and they change too frequently, to be listed here: a complete list is found at the church web site. But an example of each of these includes:

Local parish work: Lay Eucharist ministers bring communion to homebound or hospitalized parishioners.

Bay area work: The Interfaith Hospitality Network (IHN) at program brings shelter, meals and support services to families without homes. Churches of several different faiths participate in this program. The families in the program are housed at Epiphany for a one to two week stay, in rotation with other churches.

National Outreach: Each year the Church of the Epiphany sends its youth on a mission trip to grow spiritually and engage in service. Before 2006 these trips went to Mexico, but since then missions have involved been coordinated with the Group Workcamps Foundation, and have involved home-repair projects such as roofing and painting, for low-income people living in U.S.

International service: Epiphany supports human rights by signing and mailing letters supporting prisoners of conscience and victims of torture. Information for the letters is obtained through human rights organizations such as Amnesty International and Human Rights Watch.

== Education ==
The Church of the Epiphany has served the education of young people with nursery, church school and multiple youth activities since it was founded in 1947. The staff includes a full-time youth minister and many volunteers.

== Music ==
The Church of the Epiphany has a professional Director of Music, an organist, and frequently adds other professional musicians to augment its services. The Chapel Choir, made up of parish volunteers, performs each Sunday at the 10 am sung service, and youth choir also performs on special occasions. Musical facilities include a Praeludium III Galanti digital organ and a historic, 1927 Stretch A3 Steinway grand piano.

== Facilities ==
The church building, parish hall, classrooms, business offices, and play yard occupy approximately two-thirds of an acre and are surrounded by mature trees and landscaped grounds.

The Gothic-style church has a nave and sanctuary arranged in a miniature cathedral fashion. The nave seats 325. Forty-two stained glass windows located on all four walls of the sanctuary depict the four Gospel Evangelists and various Biblical themes. The chapel, which opens off the nave, is used for special services and for post-communion healing prayer. It seats approximately 25. Eight brightly colored tapestries, woven by a parishioner, hang on the rear wall of the church and behind the altars in the sanctuary and the chapel.

The parish hall, Eastburn Hall, seats approximately 175 for meetings. The building also houses classrooms, a library, a nursery, a nursery school, and staff offices. Several community groups, such as the Interfaith Hospitality Network, Alcoholics Anonymous, and the Girl Scouts, use Eastburn Hall on a regular basis.

The Church of the Epiphany has a long-term relationship with Sequoia Parents' Nursery School , a pre-school program for children ages 3 through 5 and their parents sponsored by the Sequoia Union High School District.

== Clergy ==
The Church of the Epiphany installed the Rev. Melanie Donahoe as its eighth rector in 2009. The Rt. Rev. Marc Handley Andrus was elected and installed as eighth bishop of the Episcopal Diocese of California in 2006. The Most Rev. Dr. Katharine Jefferts Schori elected as the twenty-sixth Presiding Bishop of the Episcopal Church in the United States of America (ECUSA) in 2006. A complete historical listing of all of Epiphany's rectors is available at the church web site.

== Epiphany's web site ==
The church's first site was www.quercus.org/~epiphany in 1996. Around 1999 it briefly took the name www.blessthelord.org, but that did not prove to be very popular, so after a few months it moved to www.churchoftheepiphany.org where it has been ever since. Since August 2001, each Sunday's sermon has been recorded. Sermons were first just posted on the site, but in 2007 this was complemented with a podcast.

== All are welcome ==
The philosophy and policy of the Church of the Epiphany is "All are welcome." No person is denied entrance to church services, Holy Communion, or membership in the parish.

== Brief history of the Beginning of the Church of the Epiphany ==
(This section is adapted from The First Fifty Years, a history of the Church of the Epiphany, by Sandra Burnett, with the permission of the author. The complete text of this book is available on line at the church web site.)

In the fall of 1946, Bishop Block and the Rev. Egbert B. Clark, rector of St. Peter's, Redwood City, California, agreed to call a new associate rector who would live in San Carlos and begin preparations to establish a mission church there. Subsequently, St. Peter's invited the Rev. Fordyce E. Eastburn, then on the staff of a cathedral in Texas, to come to California for an exploratory visit. The exploratory visit must have gone well, because Bishop Block immediately hired Eastburn as associate rector at St. Peter's. On June 18, the Bishop and Eastburn started shopping for a church site and recommended that the Diocesan Council buy property in the 1800 block of Arroyo Avenue.
On Sunday, Oct. 5, 1947, Rev. Eastburn celebrated Holy Communion in the Community Church with forty people attending. This is considered the beginning of the Church of the Epiphany. That week, the new mission congregation moved to Laurel Hall, at the time the only public meeting hall in San Carlos. It was located over a bar across from the firehouse on Laurel Street between Holly Street and San Carlos Avenue. The Bishop approved the selection of "Epiphany" as the new mission's name, and the name was subsequently endorsed by the Bishop's Committee. Several reasons have been suggested for the name. One is that Epiphany Sunday is the day the Eastburns arrived on the Peninsula. A second reason, provided by Lelia Eastburn, is that it was the date her husband was ordained a deacon. Or it may have been that there wasn't another Epiphany in the diocese at the time.
The Bishop's Committee (vestry) held their first official meeting Oct. 28, 1947, after the beginning of the Women's Auxiliary, which had held their first celebration on Oct. 19. The Altar Guild held its first meeting Oct. 30. During this time, Rev. Eastburn resigned as associate at St. Peter's and was appointed vicar to Epiphany by the Bishop.
The first building on the site was a combination Parish Hall and chapel, which served both as a place of worship and gathering. Volunteer work on the building site started June 24, 1948 under the leadership of Arnold M. Teza, a professional building contractor and a member of the congregation. By March 7, 1949, the average number of workers was listed as thirteen on Saturdays and four on Sundays, but sometimes as many as 24 men were on the job. Work proceeded slowly, but by Sunday, May 20, 1951, fifteen people were confirmed by Bishop Block in a windowless Parish Hall in the face of a chilly breeze.
In 1951, the church gave up its mission status to become a parish. A parish is generally a self-supporting entity which also supports the Diocese through an annual assessment. A mission generally receives support from the Diocese, but otherwise operates the same although some of the titles are different. A mission has a "vicar" who serves "vicariously" for the Bishop, the official rector of the mission, and forms a Bishop's Committee instead of a vestry.
As the congregation grew during the 1950s, it was decided to build a separate building to serve as the chapel, and leave the parish hall to serve only non-worship functions. Construction on the chapel started in July, 1958. Stained glass window designs based on the cycle of the church year in the 1928 Book of Common Prayer were developed in both modern and traditional styles, but the traditional design was selected. The chapel was dedicated in March, 1959, by Bishop James A. Pike. Ever since then facilities work has continued with various projects and improvements. For example, in 2007, a large bricked courtyard and entrance area was added in front of the parish hall.
In 1974, the parish hall was named Fordyce Eastburn Hall in honor of the first rector. Even though Rev. Eastburn left Epiphany officially in 1957, he continued his personal relationships with many of the parishioners and the parish until his death on Aug. 24, 1980.
