= KCEA =

Radio station in Atherton, California

- Atherton, California; United States
- Broadcast area: San Francisco Peninsula
- Frequency: 89.1 MHz

Programming
- Format: Big band

Ownership
- Owner: Sequoia Union High School District

History
- First air date: June 2, 1979
- Former call signs: KMAH (1979–1983); KWAP (1983–1983)
- Call sign meaning: Play on the word "sea"

Technical information
- Licensing authority: FCC
- Facility ID: 41168
- Class: A
- Power: 100 watts
- HAAT: 39 meters (128 ft)
- Transmitter coordinates: 37°29′31.7″N 122°16′31.8″W

Links
- Public license information: Public file; LMS
- Webcast: Listen live
- Website: kcea.org

KCEA (89.1 FM) is a radio station licensed to Atherton, California, United States, serving the San Francisco Peninsula. The station broadcasts a music format featuring big band, swing and adult standards in addition to local high school sports. KCEA is owned by the Sequoia Union High School District.

== History ==
In 1979, Menlo-Atherton High School founded radio station KMAH, which broadcast local music and student programming. During off hours, the station broadcast a live audio feed of the Pacific Ocean from Fort Point, San Francisco. KMAH became KCEA (named after "sea") in 1983 and switched to its present big band music format in order to attract a wider audience and financial support.

KCEA first broadcast local high school sports on January 8, 1999, when the station broadcast a Menlo-Atherton home basketball game. The October 11, 2013, broadcast of a football game between Sequoia and Terra Nova high schools was KCEA's 500th high school sports broadcast.

Frank Spinetta, a manager of the KCEA-FM and a Sequoia Union High School District employee from the 1970s through 1995, pleaded no contest in 1997 to embezzling $92,000 from the high school district, was replaced by Mike Isaacs, a College of San Mateo broadcasting instructor.

Late in October 2018, the Sequoia Union High School District Board of Trustees discussed converting KCEA into a student run station in order to align the station closer to the district's educational mission.

The NAMM Oral History Program music historian, Daniel Del Fiorentino, conducted his first interview when he worked for the KCEA radio station in 1983 to 1994. He has since then interviewed thousands of people of who have made an impact on the history of music.
