= Keith Comstock =

American baseball player (born 1955)

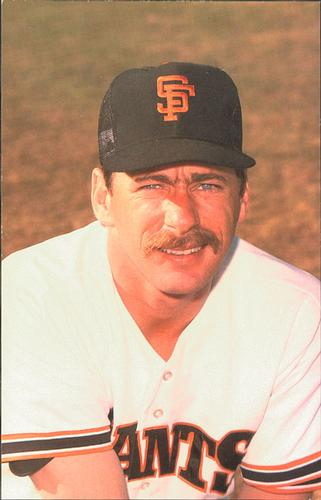
- Comstock with the San Francisco Giants in 1987
- Pitcher
- Born: December 23, 1955 (age 70); San Francisco, California, U.S.
- Batted: Left Threw: Left

Professional debut
- MLB: April 3, 1984, for the Minnesota Twins
- NPB: April 18, 1985, for the Yomiuri Giants

Last appearance
- NPB: August 16, 1986, for the Yomiuri Giants
- MLB: August 5, 1991, for the Seattle Mariners

MLB statistics
- Win–loss record: 10–7
- Earned run average: 4.06
- Strikeouts: 142

NPB statistics
- Win–loss record: 8–10
- Earned run average: 4.47
- Strikeouts: 94
- Stats at Baseball Reference

Teams
- Minnesota Twins (1984); Yomiuri Giants (1985–1986); San Francisco Giants (1987); San Diego Padres (1987–1988); Seattle Mariners (1989–1991)

Keith Martin Comstock (born December 23, 1955) is an American former professional baseball relief pitcher and coach. He played in Major League Baseball (MLB) for parts of six seasons with the Minnesota Twins, San Francisco Giants, San Diego Padres, and Seattle Mariners. He also played for the Yomiuri Giants of Nippon Professional Baseball (NPB) and several Minor League Baseball teams before his tenure in MLB.

Comstock served as a minor league and organizational pitching coach after his career.

== Career ==
Comstock was drafted by the California Angels in 1976 and played for their minor league affiliate, the Idaho Falls Angels. He spent the next eight years in the minor leagues. According to a 1990 Sports Illustrated article, in 1983 the Oakland Athletics organization sold him to the Detroit Tigers for $100 and a bag of balls, which he had to deliver himself. In 1984, he was called up to the majors by the Minnesota Twins. From 1985 to 1986, he played in Japan for Nippon Professional Baseball's Yomiuri Giants, and from 1987 to 1991 he played for the San Francisco Giants, San Diego Padres, and Seattle Mariners as well as minor league teams.

In 1989, while playing for the Las Vegas Stars Triple-A team, Comstock appeared on a memorable baseball card pretending to be hit in the crotch by a ball. ESPN called it "the funniest baseball card ever made." He was part of a seven-player trade going from the Giants to the Padres in July 1987 that sent Kevin Mitchell to the Giants. By the end of his career, Comstock had played in teams across the United States, Canada, Mexico, Venezuela, Japan, and Puerto Rico.

Comstock subsequently went into coaching. He was a minor league pitching coach for several seasons and was the rehab pitching coordinator for the Texas Rangers in 2008.

== Personal life ==
Comstock was born in San Francisco, California and attended San Carlos High School in San Carlos, California.

Comstock is the great-grandson of the former United States Postal Inspector and politician Anthony Comstock. He lives in Arizona with his wife. He has three children and six grandchildren. Comstock's younger brother pitched in the minors in 1987 and 1988.
