= Tierra Linda Middle School =

Location
- 750 Dartmouth Avenue, San Carlos, California 94070 United States; 37°30′34″N 122°17′02″W

Information
- Type: Public middle school
- Established: September 5, 2000 (originally open from 1953–1982)
- School district: San Carlos School District
- Superintendent: Jennifer Frentress
- NCES School ID: 063429008627
- Principal: Charu Gulati (2023 - Present)
- Grades: 6th-8th grade
- Age range: 11-14
- Enrollment: 458 (2022-2023)
- Colors: Maroon and Silver
- Mascot: Timberwolves
- Rival: Central Middle School
- Newspaper: TL Times Newspaper
- Website: Official website

Tierra Linda Middle School is a middle school in San Carlos, California, United States, founded in 1953. It is one of two middle schools within the San Carlos Elementary School District, and since 2018, has served students in grades 6–8. Due to changing enrollment, the school was closed in 1982, but reopened in 2000. It shares a campus with Mariposa Upper Elementary School and San Carlos Charter Learning Center.

== About ==
Tierra Linda Middle School serves students in grades 6–8, and as of the 2019–2020 school year, is home to 500 students. Most students come from Mariposa Upper Elementary School, a bridge school for grades 4–5 that shares Tierra Linda's campus. After graduation from the San Carlos Elementary School District, most students are geographically slotted to attend Carlmont High School, although some students choose to attend other schools within the Sequoia Union High School District or a nearby private school.

== History ==
=== Early years ===
The first wave of baby boomers, born after World War II, entered school in the 1950s. In San Carlos, local class sizes jumped to more than forty students; district-wide, enrollment increased from 340 students in 1940 to 2,249 students by 1949, and 3,388 in 1965. To accommodate this growth, the San Carlos School District opened several elementary schools to serve students in grades K–6. When the city's only middle school, Central Middle School, reached capacity, local School Board members studied potential locations for a second middle school. In particular, due to recent growth on the city's west side, locations near Carlmont High School in Belmont were considered.

In March 1951, the district purchased a 20-acre site at a cost of $68,750 which is the present-day site of Tierra Linda. Devonshire Boulevard, which lies east of Tierra Linda's campus, was the original western boundary of San Carlos, meaning Tierra Linda was originally located within Belmont's boundaries. The site was transferred to the City of San Carlos in October 1956, several years after the school's opening. The school was constructed in 1952 and 1953 at a cost of $441,042. It opened in the 1953–1954 school year for grades 7 and 8 and later expanded to grades K–8. From the 1960s to his retirement in 1980, Ralph Howitt served as the school's principal, following his tenure at local elementary school Brittan Acres.

Enrollment at local schools increased through the end of the 1960s, but by the late 1970s, all San Carlos schools experienced declining enrollment. In 1982, with too few students to justify the opening of the school, the district closed Tierra Linda. Elementary schools served K–6 students, and all seventh and eighth grade students in San Carlos attended Central Middle School.

By the 1990s, enrollment was predicted to increase in San Carlos schools. Elementary schools were reorganized to house students in grades K–4, and Tierra Linda officially reopened on September 5, 2000, to grades 5–8. Prior to the reopening, several new buildings were constructed on the site, including locker rooms, a gym, a music room, a library, a computer room, and the science wing. The school's office was remodeled in 2005, and a band room and art room were also built. Most classrooms were modernized in 2007, including the installation of several portable buildings to be used as classrooms.

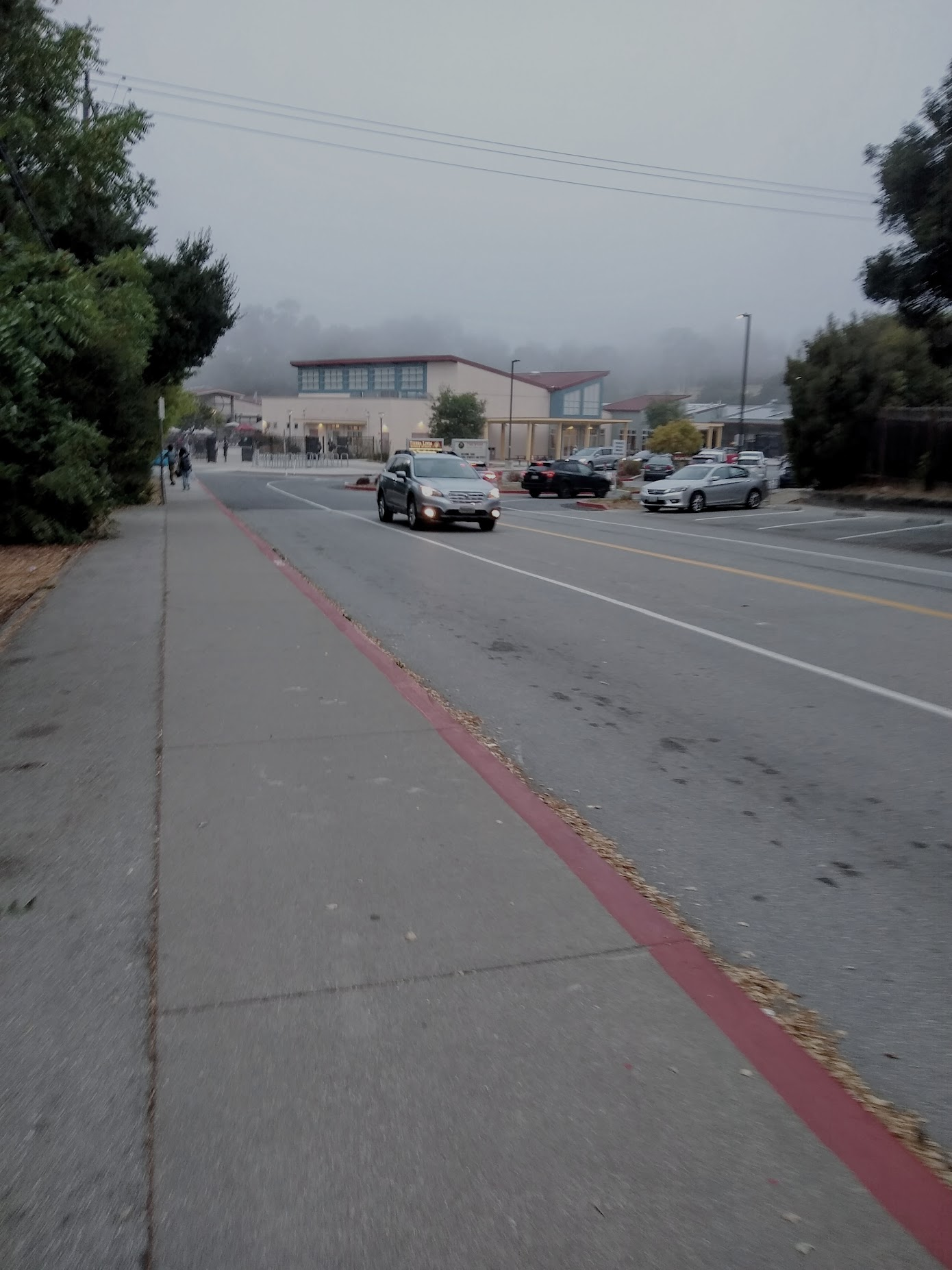
Tierra Linda Middle School in 2023 on a foggy morning.

=== 2015–2018 Renovation and Restructuring ===
Throughout San Carlos, school enrolment was predicted to increase which required the construction of new classrooms. As most elementary schools were already nearing capacity, the San Carlos School District opted instead to bring fourth grade students, previously at elementary schools, to its two middle schools. Schools were restructured into three levels: grades K–3 elementary schools, grades 4–5 upper elementary schools, and grades 6–8 middle schools. Between 2016 and 2017, the school office was remodeled.

Construction was delayed significantly and the project cost about $5 million more than the district initially budgeted. A year after the expected completion date, Mariposa opened to fifth grade students in August 2018, and fourth and fifth grade students in August 2019.

== Statistics ==
=== Demographics ===
2022-2023, based on Tierra Linda's 2023 School Accountability Report Card:

- 458 students: Male (52%), Female (47.8%)

	Hispanic	White	Asian	African American	Pacific Islander	Two or More Races	Total
Students	14.4%	45.6%	23.8%	1.1%	0.7%	12.4%	458

Among the student body:

- 2.4% of students are English language learners
- 13.1% of students receive special education services
- 0.7% of students are homeless

== Speech and Debate ==
Since 2021, Tierra Linda Middle School has also had an active speech and debate team, competing at both local, national, and international tournaments. Notably, they won the NSDA Middle School National Tournament in 2024 and the Stanford Invitational in 2025, and championed the CHSSA Middle School State Championships in 2023 and 2024. The club's coach, math teacher Marty De, competed in Lincoln-Douglas Debate, U.S. Extemp, and Prose during high school and was a District Champion and National Qualifier.
