= Tom Petithomme =

American football player (born 1972)

Profile
- Position: Fullback / Linebacker

Personal information
- Born: October 17, 1972 (age 54); Modesto, California, U.S.
- Listed height: 6 ft 1 in (1.85 m)
- Listed weight: 240 lb (109 kg)

Career information
- College: Modesto Junior College San Jose State

Career history
- San Jose SaberCats (1995–1996); New Jersey Red Dogs (1997–1998); Iowa Barnstormers (1998); San Jose SaberCats (1999)

Career AFL statistics
- Rush attempts: 110
- Rushing yards: 420
- Rushing TDs: 19
- Tackles: 53
- Interceptions: 1
- Stats at ArenaFan.com

Tom Petithomme is a former star for the Arena Football League's San Jose SaberCats and currently holds the fourth highest rushing total in the Arena League's history. Petithomme currently teaches Physical Education at Central Middle School in San Carlos, California, United States.
