= Portola Valley Elementary School District =

School district in California

Address
- 4575 Alpine Road Portola Valley, California, 94028; United States

District information
- Type: Public
- Grades: K–8
- NCES District ID: 0631470

Students and staff
- Students: 491 (2020–2021)
- Teachers: 38.02 (FTE)
- Staff: 32.96 (FTE)
- Student–teacher ratio: 12.91:1

Other information
- Website: www.pvsd.net

The Portola Valley Elementary School District is a top-ranked public elementary school district in the San Francisco Bay Area, USA, serving the communities of Portola Valley and Woodside. The district, code 4168981, serves over 700 students. About half of the students from this district matriculate to the Sequoia Union High School District and half to a number of independent high schools in the area.

== Schools ==
- Corte Madera School (Grades 4-8).
- Ormondale School (Grades K-3)

== Awards ==
- Corte Madera was named a national Blue Ribbon School in 2008.
- Corte Madera won the California Distinguished School award in 2011.
