= San Carlos, California =

City in California, United States

- City
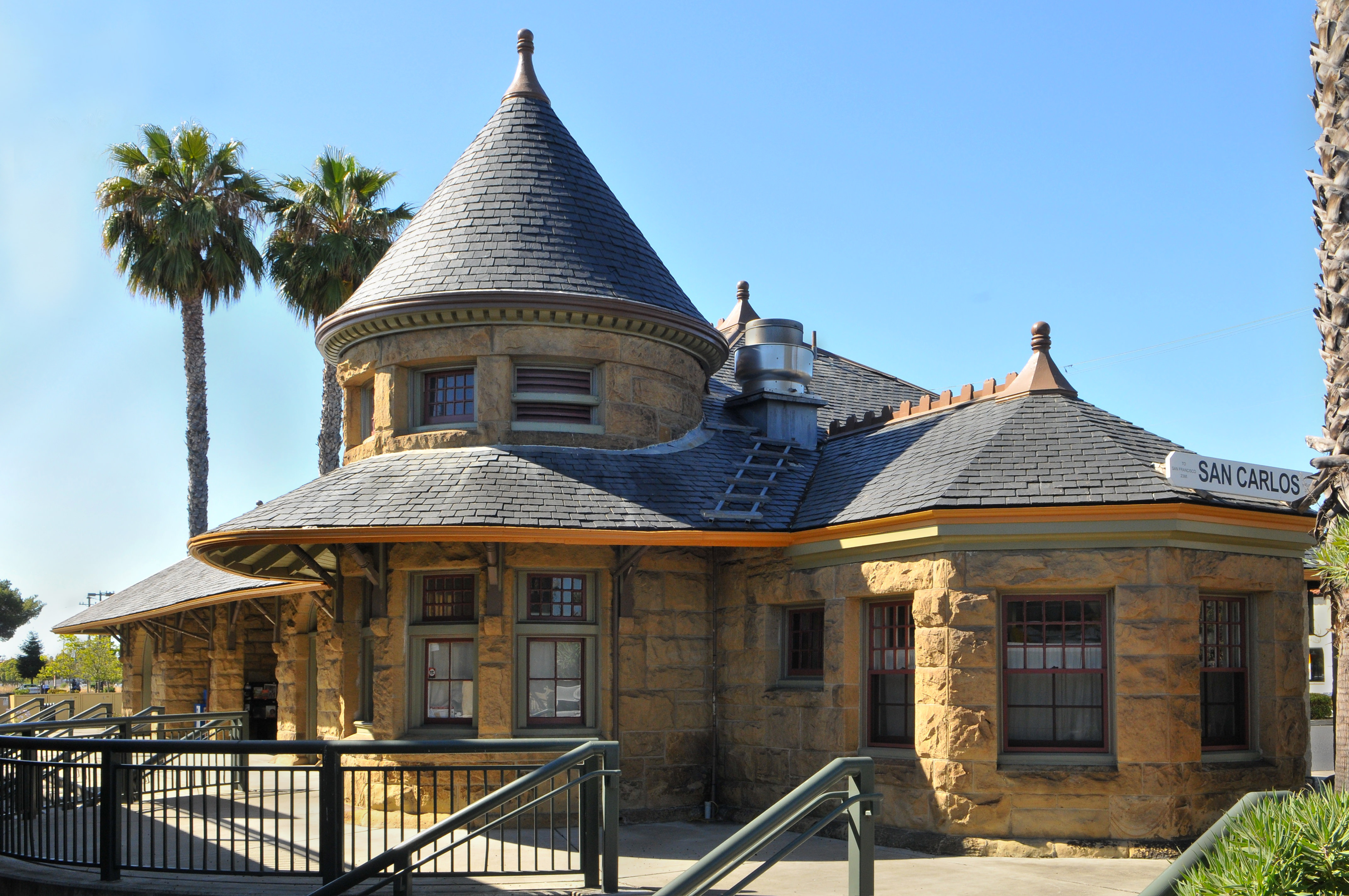
- San Carlos Train Station

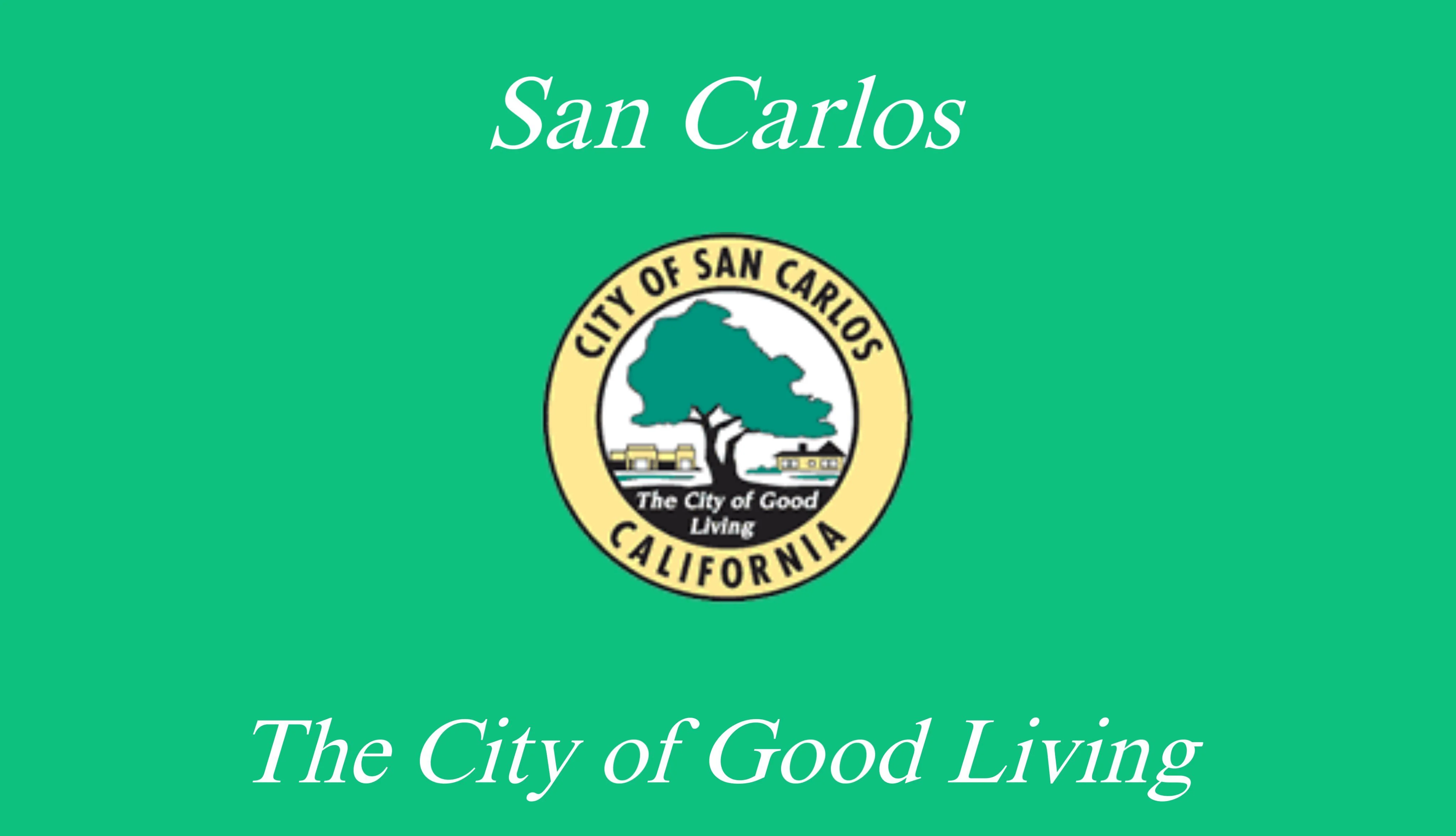
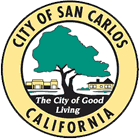
- Flag Seal
- Motto: "City Of Good Living"
- Interactive map of San Carlos, California
- Location in the contiguous United States of America
- Coordinates: 37°29′44″N 122°16′00″W
- Country: United States
- State: California
- County: San Mateo
- Incorporated: July 8, 1925
- Named for: Unknown (suggested to be San Carlos, King Charles III, Feast of St. Charles)

Government
  - Type: Council–manager
  - City council: Sara McDowell, Mayor; Pranita Venkatesh, Vice Mayor; John Dugan; Neil Layton; Adam Rak
  - City treasurer: Inge Tiegel
  - City manager: Jeff Maltbie
  - State senator: Josh Becker (D)
  - Assemblymember: Diane Papan (D)

Area
  - Total: 5.41 sq mi (14.02 km^{2})
  - Land: 5.41 sq mi (14.02 km^{2})
  - Water: 0 sq mi (0.00 km^{2}) 0.01%
- Elevation: 33 ft (10 m)

Population (2020)
  - Total: 30,722
  - Density: 5,578.2/sq mi (2,153.76/km^{2})
- Demonym: San Carlan
- Time zone: UTC−8 (Pacific)
  - Summer (DST): UTC−7 (PDT)
- ZIP codes: 94070, 94071
- Area code: 650
- FIPS code: 06-65070
- GNIS feature IDs: 277592, 2411780
- Website: cityofsancarlos.org

San Carlos (Spanish for "St. Charles") is a city in San Mateo County, California, United States. San Carlos is a part of Silicon Valley. The population is 30,722 per the 2020 census.

== History ==
=== Native Americans ===
Prior to the Spanish arrival in 1769, the land of San Carlos was occupied by a group of Native Americans who called themselves the Lamchins. While they considered themselves to have a separate identity from other local tribes, modern scholars consider them to be a part of the Ohlone or Costanoan tribes that inhabited the Bay Area.

The Lamchins referred to the area of their primary residence—probably on the north bank of Pulgas creek—as "Cachanihtac", which included their word for vermin. When the Spanish arrived, they translated this as "the fleas", or "las Pulgas", giving many places and roads their modern names.

The Native American life was one of traditional hunting and gathering. There was plentiful game and fowl available, and fish could be caught in the San Francisco Bay. There were also grasses, plants and oak trees (for acorns), and archaeological finds of mortars and pestles indicate that these source were processed for food. No doubt they also participated in the regional trading networks for goods that could not be gathered or grown locally.

The Lamchin permanent village is thought to have been between the modern streets of Alameda de las Pulgas and Cordilleras Avenue, near San Carlos Avenue.

=== Spanish colonial era ===
In 1769, Gaspar de Portolá was the first westerner to reach the San Francisco Bay. While early historians placed his approach to the Bay from the Pacific Ocean as coming over the San Carlos hills, present researchers believe this "discovery" actually occurred in present-day Belmont.

The Spanish, with overwhelming military and economic advantages over the native population, quickly dominated the Bay Area. Initially, the missionaries invited local people to join them at Mission San Francisco de Asís (Mission Dolores) and convert to Christianity. Facing the end of their way of life, the local population had little choice but to seek assistance from the missions and convert to Christianity. Traditional trade routes and alliances fell apart. The Lamchin were one of the first local peoples to move to the mission. The first Lamchin were baptized at the mission in 1777 and last 1794. A total of 139 Lamchin people appear in the mission's baptismal records.

Afterward, the land was deeded in large "ranchos", or ranches, to prominent and wealthy Spaniards, with no concern for the native populations that lived on them. The new ranch owners raised cattle on the lands, displacing the native game populations and disrupting the food supply of the indigenous population. As well, the Spanish strongly discouraged the Native Americans from their periodic controlled burns, which helped maintain the grasslands.

The land now occupied by the city of San Carlos was deeded as a single large rancho to Don José Darío Argüello. He and his family did not live there, but rather raised cattle and crops for money on "Rancho Cachinetac" (a Spanish derivation of "Cachanihtac"). José's son Luis Argüello was the first California-born governor of the state, and after his death in 1830 the remaining family moved to the ranch, now known as Rancho de las Pulgas. The family abode was located at the present-day intersection of Magnolia and Cedar streets.

=== Late 19th century ===
While the California Gold Rush of 1849 found no gold nearby, disappointed Sierra Nevada prospectors made their way to the region, bringing the first non-Spanish western settlers. The Argüello family retained deed to their ranch through the transfer of governments to the United States, and, in the 1850s, began selling parcels of it through their agent S. M. Mezes.

While the port of Redwood City, to the south, and the town of Belmont, to the north, both grew quickly in the late 19th century, San Carlos' growth was much slower. Major portions were purchased by the Brittan Family, the Hull Family, the Ralston family and Timothy Guy Phelps.

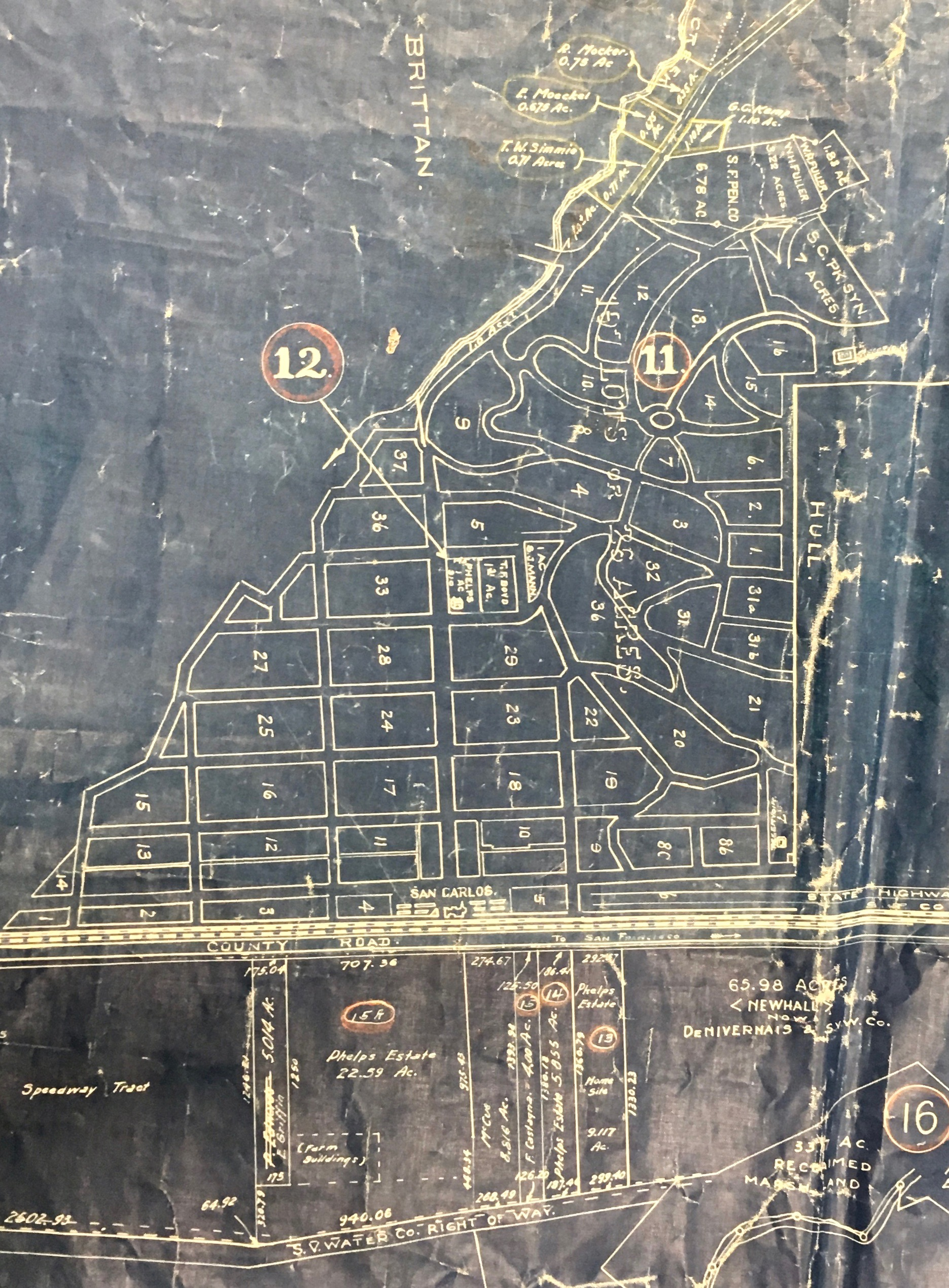
Parcel divide of the Phelps Estate as of 1917

Timothy Phelps, a wealthy politician, made an early attempt to further develop the San Carlos area. He paid for significant improvements such as sewer lines and street grading, and began to promote lot sales in what he immodestly called "The Town of Phelps".

Phelps' sales were largely unsuccessful, and he eventually sold much of his land to Nicholas T. Smith's San Carlos Land Development Company. Other developers were not overly fond of Phelps' eponymous efforts, and decided to rename the town. Some maps are existent referring to the area as "Lomitas" ("little hills" in Spanish) but eventually due to historical legend, the name "San Carlos" was chosen. As noted previously, it was believed that Portolá had first seen the San Francisco Bay on November 4 from the San Carlos hills. November 4 is the feast day of St. Charles. As well, the Spanish king at the time was Carlos III, and the first ship to sail into San Francisco bay was the San Carlos.

The newly named region—not yet incorporated—received a boost with the construction of the Peninsula Railroad Corridor in 1863, and the addition, of a station at San Carlos in 1888.

Growth remained slow through the turn of the 20th century, with most residents enjoying the short 35-minute train ride to San Francisco while living in a rural setting. The Hull family operated a dairy located at the modern intersection of Hull and Laurel. Many of the other residents which were not involved in agriculture were wealthy business and professional men who worked with the railroad or in San Francisco.

Despite the efforts of the developers, growth was very slow in this period, and San Carlos ended the 19th century with fewer than one hundred houses and families.

=== 1900–1941 ===
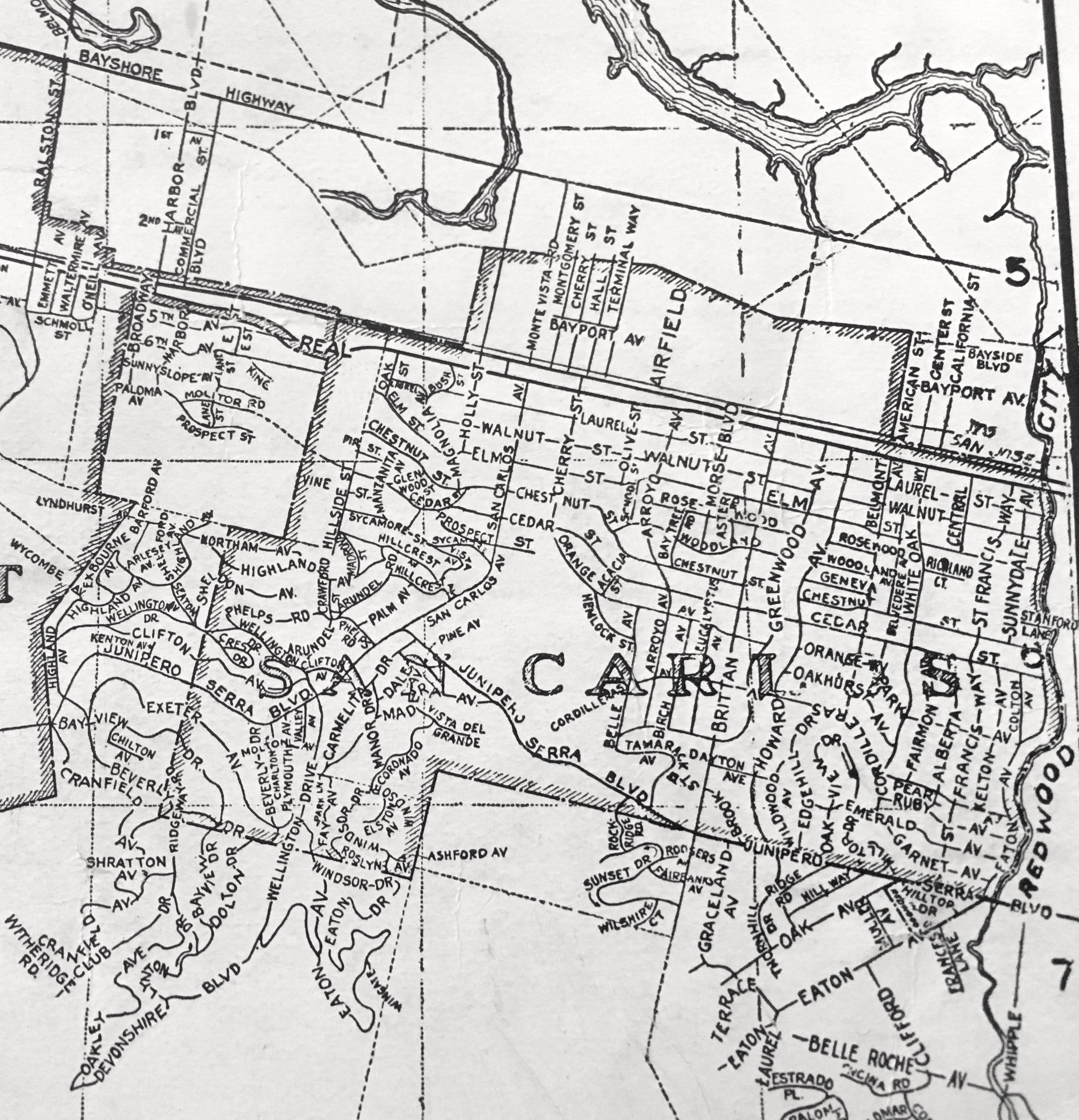
City limits and streets in 1937

The turn of the 20th century saw the layout of the initial town streets. While "Old County Road" east of the railroad track had been in use as a stage line since at least 1850, the present-day layout west of the railroad track was constructed in the first years of the 20th century. Cedar, Elm, Laurel, Magnolia, Maple (renamed El Camino Real) and Walnut were put down in this time.

Growth remained slow through the first fifteen years of the new century, but in 1918 the town had grown enough to build a school at 600 Elm Street. One year previously Frederick Drake ("The Father of San Carlos") had purchased 130 acres (53 hectares) of real estate in San Carlos in foreclosure, and began marketing it. Growth came quickly, and the early 1920s saw Drake build an office at the southwest corner of Cypress (now San Carlos Ave) and El Camino Real, which is still existent, and as of May 2023 is home to Drake's Restaurant, dedicated to Frederick Drake. In the early 1920s, the cypresses along Cypress Ave. were removed, and the street widened and renamed San Carlos Ave. In 1923 the growing municipality founded a fire station, and on July 8, 1925, the founders voted to incorporate.

The Great Depression affected families in San Carlos, as it did everywhere, but growth continued, and population grew from approximately 600 at incorporation in 1925 to 5,000 in 1941.

In 1932, Charles Litton Sr. founded Litton Engineering Laboratories in San Carlos, revolutionizing vacuum tube production with his invention of the glass-blowing lathe. This innovation laid the groundwork for advancements in electronics and communications, making the company a key precursor to Litton Industries in 1953.

While services such as stores increased in this period, by the beginning of World War II San Carlos was still known in the Bay Area as a rural community. Most of the land in the municipality was still used for agricultural purposes, and photographs of the time show a landscape with few houses separated by large fields.

=== 1941–1945 ===
==== War Dogs ====
During World War II, not long after the attack on Pearl Harbor, the American Kennel Club and a new group calling itself "Dogs for Defense" mobilized dog owners across the country to donate quality animals to the Quartermaster Corps. Dogs donated by a patriotic public to the Army saved the lives of a number of soldiers in combat.

In October 1942, the US Army and “Dogs for Defense” came to San Carlos. The 178-acre (72 ha) site, at the top of today's Club and Crestview Drives, which was locally known as the H and H Ranch, was selected to become the US Army War Dog Reception and Training Center (also known as Western Remount Area Reception and Training Center). It was established between October 15 and November 7, 1942.

The first enlisted men for the army post were temporarily housed in the San Carlos Fire Station (located on Laurel Street between San Carlos Ave. and Holly St.) from December 15 to 28, 1942. Each dog handler was given four dogs to train, and at the end of the course, the trainer selected the best one and shipped out. Dogs were trained for sentry, attack, scout, and messenger roles, and later to detect mines. The facility could accommodate 1,200 dogs at any one time.

The first army dog platoon to go overseas in the Pacific was the 25th Quartermaster Corps War Dog Platoon, under the command of 1st Lt. Bruce D. Walker. When they left San Carlos on May 11, 1944, none of the handlers knew what their final destination would be. They left via San Francisco aboard the Liberty ship SS John Isaacson for assignments in the Pacific Theatre.

The facility closed in October 1944, with approximately 4,500 dogs going through the facility during the war.

=== 1945 to the end of the 20th century ===
In 1944, Dalmo Victor established the city's first large electronics plant, followed soon after by Eitel McCullough, Varian Associates (Later occupied by Tesla Motors and currently by Devil's Canyon Brewing Company), and Lenkurt Electric Company.

Establishment of these two firms was a factor in the quadrupling of San Carlos population in the decade after 1940. In 1950, when the population was 14,371, the city boasted a total of 89 industries: wholesalers, manufacturers and distributors, producing a variety of commodities from electronics to cosmetic. By 1958, the electronic industry comprised a substantial segment of the city's industrial area.

In the late 1940s when Bayshore was a two-lane road, the San Carlos Airport was moved from its former location between Brittan and San Carlos Avenues to its present site. The airport was bought by the county from Cal West Yacht Harbor in 1964 for $990,000.

In 2022, the city received national attention after a woman was beheaded with a sword.

In 2025, San Carlos is set to celebrate its Centennial Year.

== Geography ==
San Carlos is located on the San Francisco Peninsula.

According to the United States Census Bureau, the city has a total area of 5.41 square miles (14.0 km^{2}), of which 5.41 square miles (14.0 km^{2}) is land and 0.01% is water.

=== Climate ===
Climate data for San Carlos, California
Month	Jan	Feb	Mar	Apr	May	Jun	Jul	Aug	Sep	Oct	Nov	Dec	Year
Record high °F (°C)	78 (26)	80 (27)	89 (32)	97 (36)	102 (39)	109 (43)	110 (43)	105 (41)	110 (43)	104 (40)	87 (31)	77 (25)	110 (43)
Mean daily maximum °F (°C)	58.5 (14.7)	62.3 (16.8)	65.5 (18.6)	70.2 (21.2)	74.4 (23.6)	79.2 (26.2)	82.4 (28.0)	82.1 (27.8)	80.2 (26.8)	74.4 (23.6)	65.3 (18.5)	58.2 (14.6)	71.1 (21.7)
Mean daily minimum °F (°C)	40.3 (4.6)	43.8 (6.6)	45.2 (7.3)	46.5 (8.1)	50.7 (10.4)	54.3 (12.4)	56.3 (13.5)	56.5 (13.6)	54.4 (12.4)	50.5 (10.3)	44.3 (6.8)	40.1 (4.5)	48.6 (9.2)
Record low °F (°C)	16 (−9)	25 (−4)	29 (−2)	33 (1)	36 (2)	39 (4)	40 (4)	43 (6)	38 (3)	33 (1)	29 (−2)	19 (−7)	16 (−9)
Average precipitation inches (mm)	4.02 (102)	4.09 (104)	3.13 (80)	1.16 (29)	0.47 (12)	0.1 (2.5)	0.01 (0.25)	0.05 (1.3)	0.16 (4.1)	1.06 (27)	2.37 (60)	3.84 (98)	20.46 (520.15)
Source: "The Weather Channel

== Demographics ==
Historical population
Census	Pop.	Note	%±
1930	1,132		—
1940	3,520		211.0%
1950	14,371		308.3%
1960	21,370		48.7%
1970	26,053		21.9%
1980	24,710		−5.2%
1990	26,167		5.9%
2000	27,718		5.9%
2010	28,406		2.5%
2020	30,722		8.2%
U.S. Decennial Census; 1860–1870 1880-1890; 1900 1910 1920; 1930 1940 1950; 1960 1970 1980; 1990 2000 2010

=== Racial and ethnic composition ===
San Carlos city, California – Racial and ethnic composition Note: the US Census treats Hispanic/Latino as an ethnic category. This table excludes Latinos from the racial categories and assigns them to a separate category. Hispanics/Latinos may be of any race.
Race / Ethnicity (NH = Non-Hispanic)	Pop 2000	Pop 2010	Pop 2020	% 2000	% 2010	% 2020
White alone (NH)	22,234	20,786	18,722	80.22%	73.17%	60.94%
Black or African American alone (NH)	193	214	259	0.70%	0.75%	0.84%
Native American or Alaska Native alone (NH)	37	32	43	0.13%	0.11%	0.14%
Asian alone (NH)	2,155	3,234	5,821	7.77%	11.38%	18.95%
Native Hawaiian or Pacific Islander alone (NH)	105	67	81	0.38%	0.24%	0.26%
Other race alone (NH)	56	108	213	0.20%	0.38%	0.69%
Mixed race or Multiracial (NH)	805	1,110	2,167	2.90%	3.91%	7.05%
Hispanic or Latino (any race)	2,133	2,855	3,416	7.70%	10.05%	11.12%
Total	27,718	28,406	30,722	100.00%	100.00%	100.00%

=== 2020 census ===
As of the 2020 census, San Carlos had a population of 30,722. The population density was 5,676.6 inhabitants per square mile (2,191.7/km^{2}). The median age was 42.3 years. 23.4% of residents were under the age of 18 and 16.6% of residents were 65 years of age or older. For every 100 females there were 94.3 males, and for every 100 females age 18 and over there were 92.1 males age 18 and over.

100.0% of residents lived in urban areas, while 0.0% lived in rural areas.

There were 11,791 households in San Carlos, of which 36.0% had children under the age of 18 living in them. Of all households, 61.1% were married-couple households, 12.3% were households with a male householder and no spouse or partner present, and 21.6% were households with a female householder and no spouse or partner present. About 22.4% of all households were made up of individuals and 10.6% had someone living alone who was 65 years of age or older.

There were 12,244 housing units, of which 3.7% were vacant. The homeowner vacancy rate was 0.5% and the rental vacancy rate was 5.2%.

Racial composition as of the 2020 census
Race	Number	Percent
White	19,476	63.4%
Black or African American	268	0.9%
American Indian and Alaska Native	99	0.3%
Asian	5,876	19.1%
Native Hawaiian and Other Pacific Islander	82	0.3%
Some other race	1,090	3.5%
Two or more races	3,831	12.5%

=== 2010 census ===
The 2010 United States census reported that San Carlos had a population of 28,406. The population density was 5,126.9 inhabitants per square mile (1,979.5/km^{2}). The racial makeup of San Carlos was 22,497 (79.2%) White, 233 (0.8%) African American, 65 (0.2%) Native American, 3,267 (11.5%) Asian, 70 (0.2%) Pacific Islander, 827 (2.9%) from other races, and 1,447 (5.1%) from two or more races. Hispanic or Latino of any race were 2,855 persons (10.1%).

The Census reported that 28,315 people (99.7% of the population) lived in households, 79 (0.3%) lived in non-institutionalized group quarters, and 12 (0%) were institutionalized.

There were 11,524 households, out of which 3,854 (33.4%) had children under the age of 18 living in them, 6,645 (57.7%) were opposite-sex married couples living together, 830 (7.2%) had a female householder with no husband present, 352 (3.1%) had a male householder with no wife present. There were 481 (4.2%) unmarried opposite-sex partnerships, and 112 (1.0%) same-sex married couples or partnerships. 2,972 households (25.8%) were made up of individuals, and 1,109 (9.6%) had someone living alone who was 65 years of age or older. The average household size was 2.46. There were 7,827 families (67.9% of all households); the average family size was 2.99.

The population was spread out, with 6,699 people (23.6%) under the age of 18, 1,176 people (4.1%) aged 18 to 24, 7,657 people (27.0%) aged 25 to 44, 8,827 people (31.1%) aged 45 to 64, and 4,047 people (14.2%) who were 65 years of age or older. The median age was 42.6 years. For every 100 females, there were 93.6 males. For every 100 females age 18 and over, there were 90.7 males.

There were 12,018 housing units at an average density of 2,169.1 units per square mile (837.5 units/km^{2}), of which 8,282 (71.9%) were owner-occupied, and 3,242 (28.1%) were occupied by renters. The homeowner vacancy rate was 1.4%; the rental vacancy rate was 5.3%. 21,635 people (76.2% of the population) lived in owner-occupied housing units and 6,680 people (23.5%) lived in rental housing units.

=== 2000 census ===
As of the 2000 census, there were 27,238 people, 11,455 households, and 7,606 families residing in the city. The population density was 4,685.1 inhabitants per square mile (1,808.9/km^{2}). There were 11,691 housing units at an average density of 1,976.1 units per square mile (763.0 units/km^{2}).

There were 11,455 households, out of which 29.7% had children under the age of 18 living with them, 56.5% were married couples living together, 7.2% had a female householder with no husband present, and 33.6% were non-families. 25.7% of all households were made up of individuals, and 9.6% had someone living alone who was 65 years of age or older. The average household size was 2.40 and the average family size was 2.93.

In the city, the population was spread out, with 22.1% under the age of 18, 4.3% from 18 to 24, 33.0% from 25 to 44, 26.2% from 45 to 64, and 14.3% who were 65 years of age or older. The median age was 40 years. For every 100 females, there were 92.6 males. For every 100 females age 18 and over, there were 88.6 males.

According to a 2007 estimate, the median income for a household in the city was $99,110, and the median income for a family was $137,325. Males had a median income of $70,554 versus $51,760 for females. The per capita income for the city was $46,628. 2.7% of the population and 1.4% of families were below the poverty line. Out of the total people living in poverty, 2.3% were under the age of 18 and 3.7% were 65 or older.

== Economy ==
Companies based in San Carlos include Check Point, MarkLogic, Helix, and Natera.

=== Top employers ===
According to the city's 2022 Annual Comprehensive Financial Report, the top employers in the city are:

#	Employer	# of Employees
1	Natera	934
2	Pacific Gas and Electric	323
3	The Home Depot	291
4	Check Point Software Technologies	225
5	Delta Star	214
6	ChemoCentryx Inc.	182
7	Joby Aero Inc.	170
8	Allakos Inc.	163
9	Atreca Inc.	140
10	Thought Stream	132

L-3 Communications manufactured gas-filled and vacuum tubes used among others in radar system and TV-emitters at their San Carlos plant. In 2016, the company announced they would be moving their operations to South California and Pennsylvania.

== Arts and culture ==
The San Carlos History Museum is dedicated to the display of the history of the town from early Native American history to the space age. This museum is open every Saturday from 1:00 PM to 4:00 PM. The Hiller Aviation Museum, a museum specializing in helicopter and aviation history, offers interactive exhibits and more than forty aircraft including a replica of the first aircraft to fly, a spy drone with a 200-foot wingspan, and the nose section of a Boeing 747.

San Carlos was also once home of the Circle Star Theater where performers such as Big Brother & the Holding Company, Richard Marx and Richard Pryor performed. It was torn down and replaced with office buildings.

Every May, the town hosts the "Hometown Days" carnival in Burton Park, the city's largest park. In October, the Chamber of Commerce hosts the San Carlos "Art & Wine Faire". October 2015 marked the 25th year it has been held. Sunday mornings during the summer Laurel street is home to a weekly farmer's market. San Carlos is home to a sculpture titled "Balancing Act" by artist James Moore, in front of Frank D. Harrington park on Laurel Street, which is often decorated for various holidays and local events.

The city is served by the San Carlos Public Library of the San Mateo County Libraries, a member of the Peninsula Library System.

== Government ==
=== Municipal government ===
The current mayor of San Carlos is Sara McDowell. The current vice mayor is Pranita Venkatesh. The three city council members are John Dugan, Neil Layton, and Adam Rak.

Brad Lewis, a producer of films including Ratatouille, served as mayor in 2008.

According to the California Secretary of State, as of February 10, 2019, San Carlos has 19,706 registered voters. Of those, 9,590 (48.7%) are registered Democrats, 3,657 (18.6%) are registered Republicans, and 5,699 (28.9%) have declined to state a political party.

=== State and federal representation ===
In the California State Legislature, San Carlos is in the 13th senatorial district, represented by Democrat Josh Becker, and in the 21st Assembly district, represented by Democrat Diane Papan.

In the United States House of Representatives, San Carlos is in California's 15th congressional district, represented by Democrat Kevin Mullin.

== Education ==
=== Public schools ===
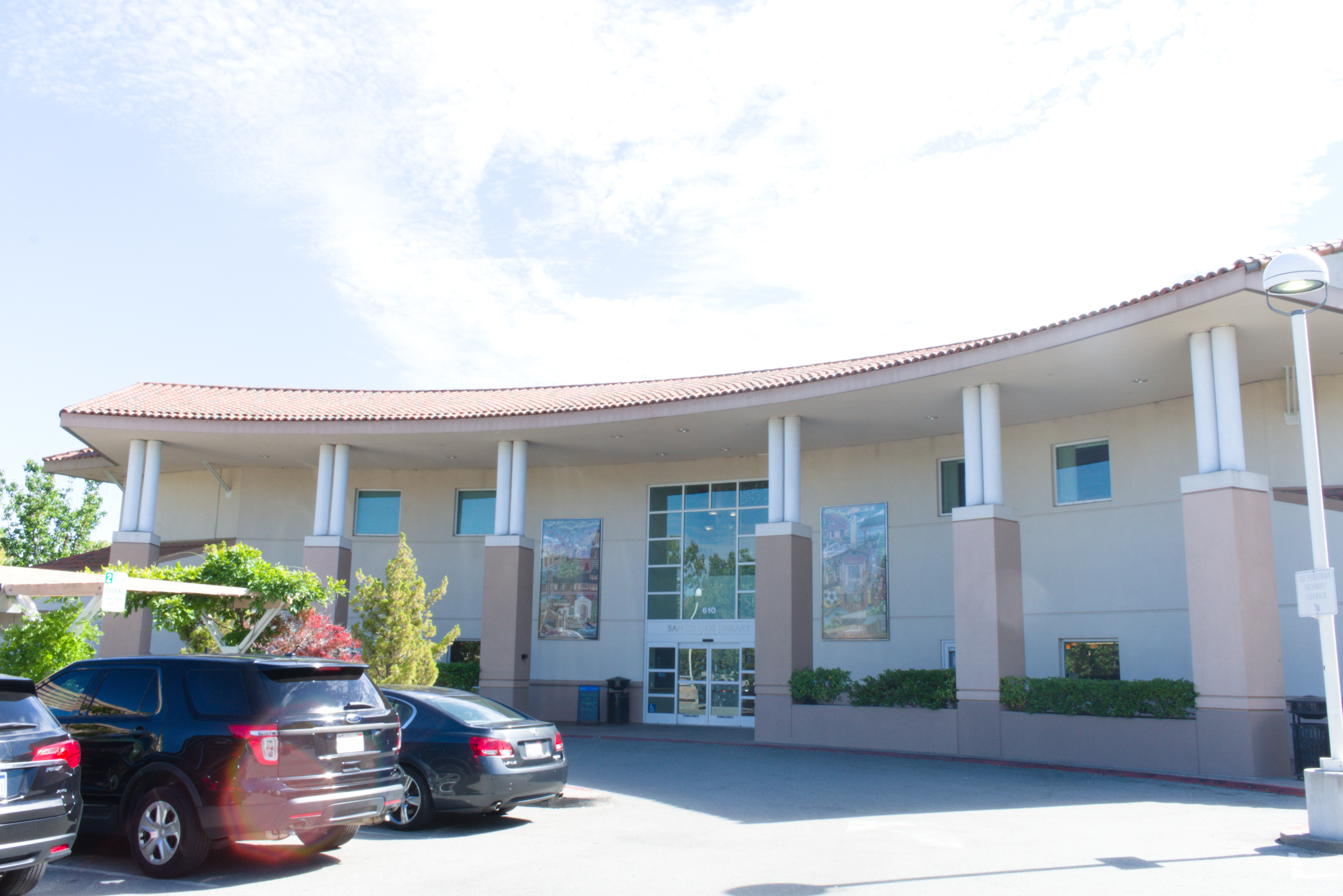
San Carlos Library

The public schools in San Carlos are run by the San Carlos School District, although the school district boundaries do not cover the entire city of San Carlos. Within the city, there are several elementary schools (grades K–3), two upper elementary schools (grades 4–5), and two middle schools (grades 6–8). Since the 1982 closure of San Carlos High School, local students have attended Sequoia High School in Redwood City and Carlmont High School in Belmont.

In 1996, Vice President Al Gore came to speak at Arundel Elementary School in regards to Net Day 1996. Former president Bill Clinton came to Charter Learning Center in 1997 to recognize the site as the second charter school in the nation.

==== Elementary schools ====
- Arundel
- Brittan Acres
- Heather
- White Oaks

==== Upper elementary schools ====
- Arroyo
- Mariposa

==== Middle schools ====
- Central Middle School
- Tierra Linda Middle School
- Charter Learning Center (Kindergarten through 8th grade)

==== High schools ====
Up until 1982 San Carlos had its own public high school, San Carlos High School. It was closed due to a decline in student enrollment from an overall aging of San Carlos residents, with the students of San Carlos middle schools divided up among the nearby Carlmont High School in Belmont and Sequoia High School in Redwood City. The playing fields were kept and converted into Highlands Park, which now hosts many local youth sporting groups, while the school was replaced with new housing. By the late 1990s and early first decade of the 21st century, city demographics changed again to a new generation of younger families with children, with the concurrent growth in student populations a new challenge for local schools.

In December 2014, the Sequoia Union High School District proposed development of a small high school in east San Carlos. Due to community opposition, the District instead selected a location in Menlo Park, which opened in 2019 as TIDE Academy.

=== Parochial schools ===
- St. Charles School

=== Private, non-parochial schools ===
- Arbor Bay School

== Infrastructure ==
=== Transportation ===
==== Bus ====
Bus service is provided by SamTrans, which is headquartered in downtown San Carlos. In 2002, the city began experimenting with a free shuttle bus service named SCOOT, short for San Carlos Optimum Operational Transit, to help with transportation difficulties for those living in the hills of the town, and especially to make up for a lack of school buses. However, voters rejected a parcel tax that placed 100% of the financial burden on property owners and the SCOOT program was dismantled on June 17, 2005.

==== Rail ====
Caltrain, also headquartered in downtown San Carlos, provides regional commuter rail service between San Francisco and San Jose, stopping at San Carlos station. Since the completion of the Peninsula Corridor Electrification Project in 2024, the station has been served by electric multiple units.

The station's original 1888 depot is a Richardsonian Romanesque structure built of Almaden sandstone; it was added to the National Register of Historic Places in 1984. The station serves as a transit hub, with connections to several SamTrans bus lines and employer-sponsored shuttles.

==== Airport ====
San Carlos Airport is located in San Carlos. It is a private airport, but will soon open the Mineta bus terminal, to allow easy transport to major airports in the area.

== Notable people ==
- Luís Antonio Argüello, first governor of Alta California
- Kathryn Bigelow, film producer, director, first woman to win the Academy Award for Best Director
- Bryan Bishop, podcast personality
- Hunter Bishop (born 1998), baseball player
- Barry Bonds, former MLB player
- Bobby Bonds, former MLB player
- Sorcha Boru, pottery maker
- Steve Capps, former Apple Fellow
- Dana Carvey, actor and comedian; raised in San Carlos
- Emma Chamberlain, internet personality and YouTuber; attended middle school in San Carlos
- Keith Comstock, former MLB player and professional baseball coach
- Jim Davenport, former MLB player/coach/manager
- Daniel Descalso, MLB player
- Jennifer Granholm, former governor of Michigan, political commentator on CNN, graduated from San Carlos High School
- Randy Gomez, former Major League Baseball catcher.
- James Kilburg, former mayor and inventor of the Geochron
- Brad Lewis, producer of Pixar film Ratatouille and former city mayor
- Kevin McCarthy, director of American Television game show, Jeopardy!
- Paul McClellan, American Major League Baseball player for the San Francisco Giants
- Mike McCurry, former United States press secretary
- Timothy Guy Phelps, president of Southern Pacific Railroad
- Greg Proops, actor and stand-up comedian
- Dick Stuart, former MLB player (born in San Francisco, raised in San Carlos)
- Tom Tennant, baseball player
- Mark Ulriksen, painter and magazine illustrator
- Rex J. Walheim, NASA astronaut, flying on three Space Shuttle missions, STS-110, STS-122 and the final Space Shuttle mission, STS-135
- Bob Wasserman, former San Carlos police chief (1969–1972) and Mayor of Fremont, California (2004–2011)

== Sister cities ==
=== Former ===
- Maroondah, Australia
- San Carlos, Río San Juan, Nicaragua
- Okotoks, Alberta, Canada

=== Current ===
- Omura, Japan
- Metepec, Mexico

== See also ==
- Episcopal Church of the Epiphany
