= TIDE Academy =

Location
- 150 Jefferson Drive; Menlo Park, California 94025; USA
- 37°28′56″N 122°10′27″W

Information
- Established: August 14, 2019
- Closed: June 30, 2026
- School district: Sequoia Union High School District
- Superintendent: Crystal Leach
- NCES School ID: 063639014381
- Principal: Simone Rick-Kennel
- Grades: 9th-12th grade
- Age range: 13-18
- Enrollment: 192 (2019–21)
  - Grade 9: 52
  - Grade 10: 40
  - Grade 11: 46
  - Grade 12: 83
- Colors: Yellow and Grey
- Mascot: Astronaut
- Newspaper: The TIDE Newspaper
- Yearbook: TIDE Academy Year Book

TIDE Academy, commonly shortened to TIDE, was a small public high school located in eastern Menlo Park, California, United States and the newest school within the Sequoia Union High School District. Founded in 2019 with a freshman class of 102 students, the school featured specialized curriculum intended to prepare students for STEM careers. Despite drawing students from across the district's borders for its unique curricular emphasis, the school was officially neither a magnet school, nor a charter school. TIDE was a comprehensive ("traditional") high school with the full range of curriculum, clubs, sports, and administrative support as the larger high schools.

== About ==
TIDE Academy, similar to nearby Design Tech High School (D-Tech), featured curriculum centered around design thinking and project-based learning. The acronym, selected with the help of a branding consultant, stands for Technology, Innovation, Design, and Engineering, indicating the school's curricular focus and its proximity to the San Francisco Bay. Students were selected by random lottery into TIDE, allowing families to come from anywhere within the district's boundaries, including Belmont, San Carlos, Redwood City, Woodside, Menlo Park, Portola Valley, and East Palo Alto. Among these 100 students, per district policy, approximately 60 percent of each grade will derive from the North Fair Oaks community and feeder neighborhoods of Menlo-Atherton High School, while the remaining 40 percent can come from any geographic region.

Students learned in small class sizes and participated in electives including hands-on research and computer science. As part of its emphasis on STEM careers, all students were required to take math for four years and enroll in local community college courses offered on campus, as a replacement for other advanced curriculum like AP and IB classes, which were not offered. Through this arrangement with Foothill College, according to the district, graduating seniors will have had the opportunity to finish up to two years of college by the time they earn their high school diploma.

In addition to academic subjects, all TIDE students participated in a Nucleus Advisory class, intended to develop interpersonal skills among students, and work-based learning experiences outside the classroom. A very limited number of sports and extracurricular activities were offered at TIDE, which included a video production class, a coding club, and a school newspaper.

Starting in 2022, TIDE students were allowed to play for Menlo-Atherton High School's sports teams.

The third freshman class only had about 65 students.

A Menlo Park shuttle served the site, although as of the 2020–2021 school year, no SamTrans buses provide access. Within the first weeks of school in 2019, a reported 60 percent of students took the bus to campus, along with several students who bike regularly.

== History ==
In the early 2010s, demographic studies suggested that student enrollment within the Sequoia Union High School District would grow beginning in the 2014–2015 school year, reaching more than 10,000 students by 2020. (Indeed, by fall 2019, the district provided education to 10,238 students.) Recognizing the significant challenge of finding enough undeveloped acreage in the Peninsula region to build a traditional, full-sized high school, the district established plans to create multiple smaller specialty schools to address the expected growth. To further reduce the physical footprint, the district announced the schools would not require additional space for athletic facilities. In 2014, the district officially proposed the creation of these schools as part of a $265 million bond measure in June 2014.

The bond measure passed with 65.6 percent support, surpassing the 55 percent requirement. In July 2015, the district proposed two locations for the schools, at 153 Jefferson Avenue in east Menlo Park, home to an office park, and 535 Old County Road in east San Carlos, home to Laureola Park and the former site of Laureola School. San Carlos residents and community members rallied to save Laureola Park from any development, noting the added congestion a high school would bring, while also noting the irony of the district closing San Carlos High School several decades earlier.

By 2016, the district agreed to withdraw plans for a high school in San Carlos, focusing instead on the Menlo Park site, which ultimately was signed as 150 Jefferson Avenue. District Superintendent James Lianides announced the school would feature a "focus on engineering, computer science, design, and project-based learning" in official plans after polling parents, teachers, and staff in the district. This focus also resembled the curriculum of Design Tech High School, a smaller, specialty high school in nearby Redwood Shores founded by the San Mateo Union High School District in 2014.

Initial opposition to the school came in the form of complaints about the Menlo Park site, from groups including the city of Menlo Park and the Bohannon Development Company. Maps prepared by the Menlo Park Fire Protection District showed that a significant majority of sites located adjacent to the site had permits to use hazardous materials, which posed a potential health hazard to students. The industrial site, while potentially enabling connections to technology firms in the area, also was noted to lack pedestrian and bicycle access, thereby forcing the use of cars and buses.

Arntz Builders of Petaluma, California, were awarded a bid for $36 million for the campus, designed to accommodate 400 students total. Construction began on the 45,000-square-foot, 3-story campus with a groundbreaking ceremony at the site on May 17, 2017. In addition to 15 classrooms, the campus includes a makerspace shop and design lab, a coding lab, and a green roof. The project's architects, sustainable design firm LPA Design Studios, created plans to maximize exposure to daylight, while also creating an L-shaped configuration to enable direct access to an outdoor learning area from every interior space.

The school opened in August 2019 with a freshman class of 106 students selected via lottery. Each year, TIDE expects to add a new freshmen class of about 115, so that by the fall of 2022, approximately 450 students are on campus. Further construction delays ultimately resulted in construction continuing after the first day of school, through mid-September, when the 2-acre campus was officially complete.

In April 2020, an anonymous letter circulated calling for the removal of Principal Dr. Allison Silvestri. It claimed major issues with TIDE stemmed from her poor leadership and an unwelcoming staff environment. Silvestri resigned as a result and was replaced for the 2021-22 school year with Simone Kennel, Menlo Atherton High School's principal.

=== Closure ===
In November 2025, Sequoia Union High School District Board Members Mary Beth Thompson and Richard Ginn, on behalf of a committee reviewing enrollment, program offerings and the district’s long-term fiscal health, asked Superintendent Crystal Leach to prepare a report on the potential closure of TIDE. On January 4, 2026, the board came to a unanimous decision to close TIDE Academy, with a phase-out planned to happen at Woodside High School, where the offerings present at TIDE will be transferred.

The last day of instruction at the Menlo Park TIDE site was June 4, 2026. As of June 30, 2026, the building is vacant.

== Statistics ==
=== Demographics ===
2019–2020, based on the WASC Accreditation Report

- 102 students: 66 male (64.7%), 36 female (35.3%)

	Hispanic	White	Asian	African American	Pacific Islander	American Indian	Two or More Races	Undefined	Total
Male	35	13	5	2	1	0	4	6	66
Female	15	8	0	3	0	0	3	7	36
Total %	49.0%	20.5%	4.9%	4.9%	0.9%	0.0%	6.8%	12.7%	100%

Among the student body:

- 49% of students are English-only speakers, in addition to 29% classified as Reclassified as Fluent English Proficient (RFEP)
- 16% of students are English language learners
- 12.5% of students receive special education services
- 33% of students are eligible for free and reduced-price lunch

== See also ==
- Sequoia Union High School District
- San Mateo County high schools
