= Spencer Folau =

Tongan gridiron football player (born 1973)

No. 71, 60
- Position: Guard

Personal information
- Born: April 5, 1973 (age 53); Nukuʻalofa, Tonga
- Listed height: 6 ft 5 in (1.96 m)
- Listed weight: 310 lb (141 kg)

Career information
- High school: Sequoia (Redwood City, California, U.S.)
- College: Idaho
- NFL draft: 1996: undrafted

Career history
- Baltimore Ravens (1996–2000); → Rhein Fire (1997); Miami Dolphins (2001); New Orleans Saints (2002–2004); Washington Redskins (2006)*
- * Offseason or practice squad member only

Awards and highlights
- Super Bowl champion (XXXV)

Career NFL statistics
- Games played: 91
- Games started: 43
- Stats at Pro Football Reference

Spencer Sione Folau (born April 5, 1973) is a former American football guard who played in the National Football League (NFL) for the Baltimore Ravens 1997-2000, Miami Dolphins 2001, New Orleans Saints 2002-2004, and Washington Redskins 2005. He was a member of the 2000 Ravens team that won Super Bowl XXXV. He is currently the offensive line and strength and conditioning coach at McDonogh (High) School, in Owings Mills, Maryland.

== Early life ==
Folau was born in Tonga but grew up in Redwood City, California.

He attended Sequoia High School in Redwood City, California.

== College career ==
Folau attended the University of Idaho and as a senior in 1995, was an honorable mention All-Big Sky Conference selection at offensive tackle. Started all 23 games of his senior and junior years at defensive tackle and recorded 70 tackles, seven for losses, a forced fumble, three pass deflections, and three sacks as a sophomore in 1993. Started three games at defensive tackle as a freshman in 1992 and Redshirted in 1991 due to a fractured ankle suffered in all-star game during the summer of 1991. Majored in General Studies.

== Professional career ==
Folau joined the Baltimore Ravens in 1996 and spent three seasons with them, winning a Super Bowl in his final season with the team. Folau had to learn all positions on the offensive line due to players like Jonathan Ogden and Orlando Brown ahead of him at his natural positions. Folau then moved on and played one season for the Miami Dolphins, he would get released by the team in early 2002.

In 2002, Folau signed with the New Orleans Saints where he played three seasons before retiring.

Folau was signed by the Washington Redskins in 2005 but he was released due to injury.

== Personal life ==
Folau is married to his wife Heather, and together they have three children.
