= San Carlos Charter Learning Center =

Charter school in San Carlos, California, U.S.

Coordinates: 37.5096°N 122.2857°W

San Carlos Charter Learning Center (SCCLC) is a public charter school in San Carlos, California, serving students in kindergarten through eighth grade. The school opened on August 29, 1994, and was the first charter school to open in California under the state's charter-school law. As of the 2025–26 school year, the school enrolled 367 students and was led by executive director Francis Dickinson.

== History ==
California's Charter Schools Act was enacted in 1992, and San Carlos Charter Learning Center opened two years later as the first charter school in the state. Early coverage described it as a school created from scratch rather than a conversion of an existing campus. It opened with about 85 students and initially operated in leased commercial space before moving to a site leased from the San Carlos Elementary School District.

The school drew statewide and national attention during the early growth of California's charter-school movement. In September 1997, President Bill Clinton and First Lady Hillary Clinton visited the campus during a roundtable on charter schools, where the president promoted expanded federal support for charter-school start-up grants. Education Week later identified Susan J. Bragato, a leading figure in California's charter-school movement, as one of the school's founders.

== Educational approach ==
A 1996 survey of early California charter schools described San Carlos Charter Learning Center as a research-and-development site for its sponsor district, with an instructional program emphasizing science, arts and humanities, technology, thematic units, and multi-age learning experiences. In 2013, Education Week reported that the school used project-based learning, multi-age classes, and teacher-developed curriculum rather than standard textbooks, which staff said gave the school flexibility in adapting to the Common Core standards.

The California Department of Education lists the school as an active direct-funded charter with charter number 0001, serving grades K through 8 at 750 Dartmouth Avenue in San Carlos.
