= Sequoia Union High School District =

School district in California, United States

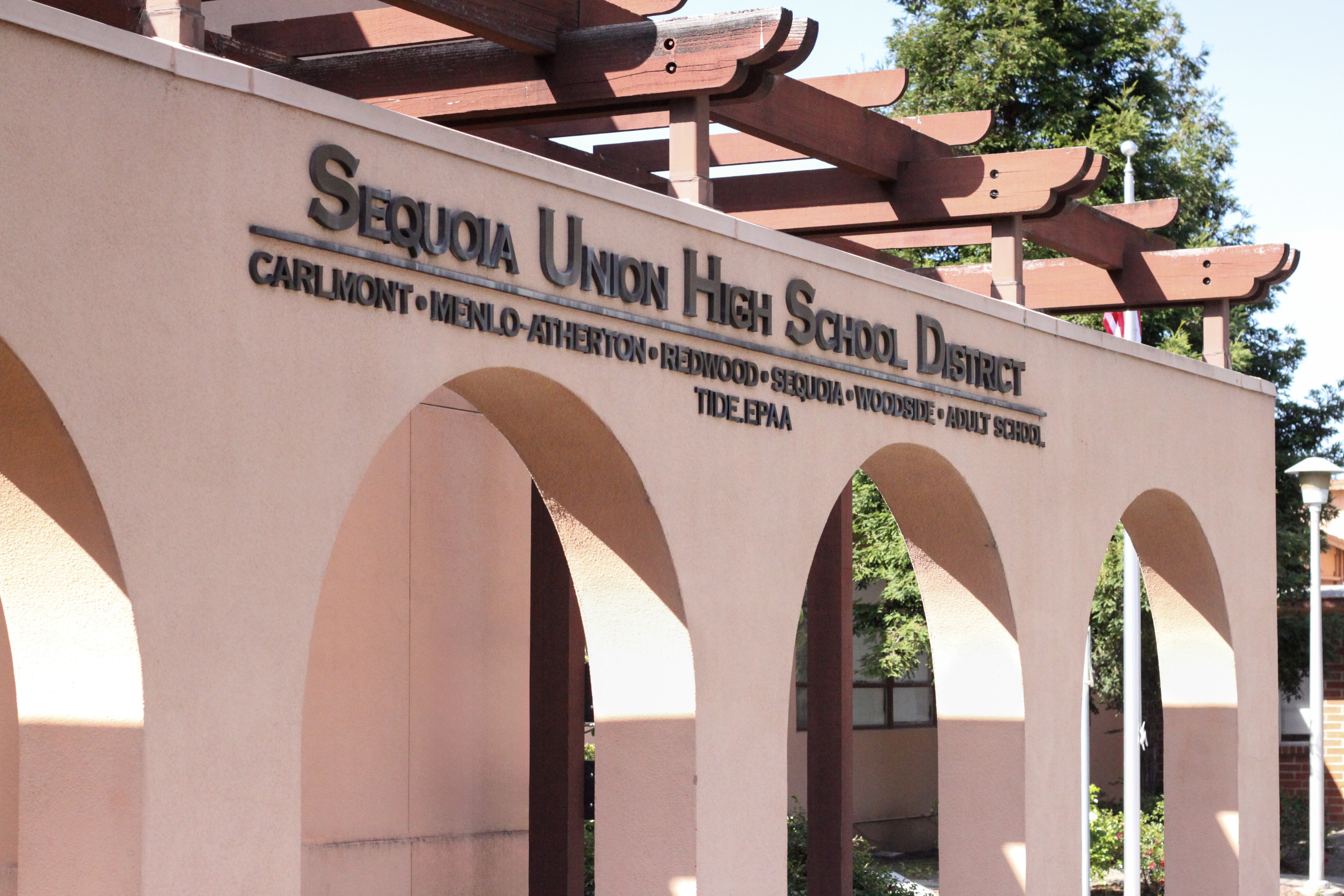
- District Headquarters

Location
- San Mateo County, California; United States
- Coordinates: 37°28′56″N 122°14′12″W

District information
- Type: Public high school district
- Grades: 9-12
- Established: 1895; 131 years ago
- Superintendent: Crystal Leach
- NCES District ID: 0636390

Students and staff
- Students: 8,743 (as of 2021–2022 school year)

Other information
- Website: www.seq.org

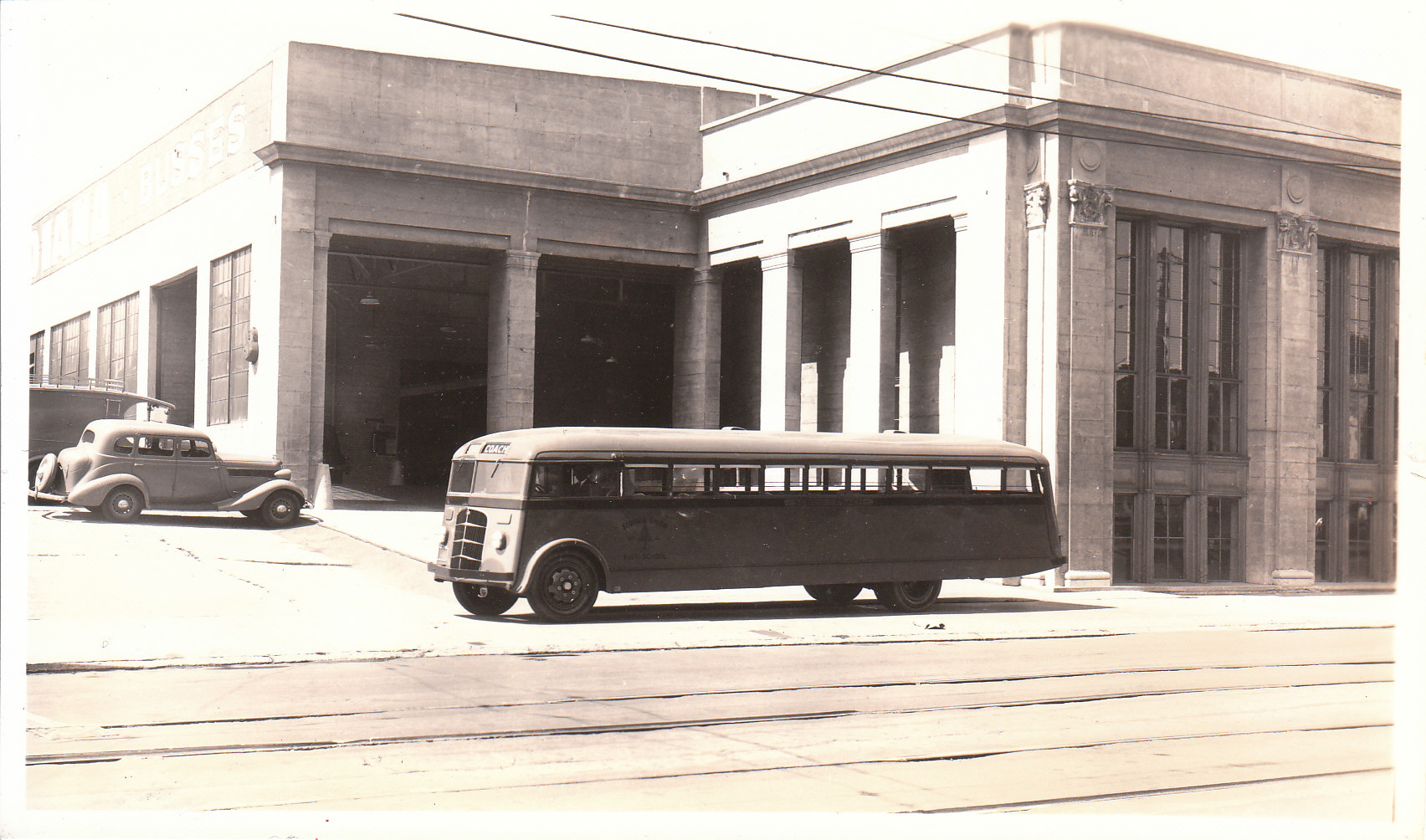
A photo of a school bus operated by Sequoia Union High School. The photo dates from the 1930s.

The Sequoia Union High School District is a public union school district in the San Francisco Bay Area, primarily serving the southern San Mateo County communities of Atherton, Belmont, East Palo Alto, Ladera, San Carlos, Menlo Park, Portola Valley, Redwood City, and Woodside. The District currently serves more than 9,000 students, and also owns the radio station KCEA.

== Schools ==
High Schools:

- Sequoia High School, founded in 1895 in Redwood City
- Menlo-Atherton High School, founded in 1951 in Atherton
- Carlmont High School, founded in 1952 in Belmont
- Woodside High School, founded in 1958 in Woodside
- East Palo Alto Academy, founded in 2001 in East Palo Alto
- Ravenswood High School, founded in 1958 and closed in 1976 due to low enrollment and racial tension (today the site of the Gateway 101 Shopping Center)
- San Carlos High School, founded in 1960 and closed in 1982 due to low enrollment (today the site of Highlands Park)

Charter Schools:

- Summit Preparatory Charter High School, founded in 2003 in Redwood City
- Everest Public High School, founded in 2009 in Redwood City

Other Schools:

- Redwood Continuation High School, in Redwood City
- Cañada Middle College, in Redwood City
- Sequoia Adult School, in Menlo Park

== Governance ==
=== Superintendent ===
- Crystal Leach (December 15, 2022–present)

=== Board of Trustees ===
The SUHSD Board of Trustees are elected by 5 districts, each representing a different geographic area served by the district. The trustees include:

- Amy Koo, Area A
- Mary Beth Thompson, Area B
- Richard Ginn, Area C
- Sathvik Nori, Area D
- Dr. Maria E. Cruz, Area E

== Controversy ==
Former Vice Principal Jennifer Cho of Carlmont High School was investigated by the district for inappropriate relationships with male students. During the investigation, Cho was placed on administrative leave before being reassigned to the district office. A police investigation in 2020 "had not found any evidence" that she committed any crime against students.

In 2020, the Sequoia District Teachers Association held a vote of no confidence against the district's then-superintendent, Mary Streshly. The teachers' union said that Streshly mishandled the district's COVID-19 response and that she struggled to make decisions and communicate a vision for the schools. Streshly resigned soon after.

On Friday, December 9, 2022, the Sequoia Union High School District called a special meeting and swore in two board members so they could participate in the private meeting that immediately followed. In that meeting they voted to hire attorney Eugene Whitlock as their legal representative. This exacerbated rumors that the new board was planning to fire Superintendent Dr. Darnise Williams. On Monday, December 12, 2022, the board heard public comment on the matter. They faced criticism from Sequoia District Teachers Association president Edith Salvatore for violating community trust. No community member expressed support for the board's actions. On Wednesday, December 14, 2022, the board announced Williams' resignation, confirming rumors. Many expressed their anger and frustration for the lack of communication about Williams' resignation. Williams received a $299,000 severance package—the same package she would have received under her contract had she been fired. Following the board's actions, the student newspaper at Menlo Atherton High School published an editorial criticizing the board's secrecy on their website and as a guest opinion on the Almanac.

== See also ==
- Belmont–Redwood Shores School District
- San Carlos School District
- Redwood City School District
- Menlo Park City School District
- Woodside Elementary School District
- Las Lomitas Elementary School District
- Portola Valley Elementary School District
- Ravenswood City School District
