= Carlmont High School =

Public high school in Belmont, California

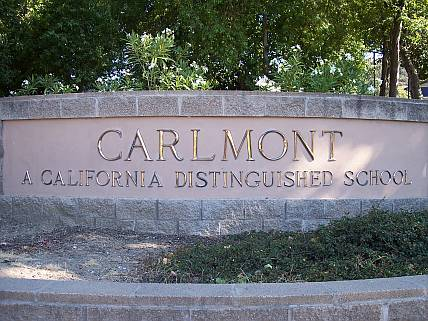
- Entrance sign to the high school

Location
- 1400 Alameda De Las Pulgas; Belmont, California 94002; United States
- 37.5063°N 122.2901°W

Information
- Type: Public high school
- Established: 1952; 74 years ago
- School district: Sequoia Union High
- NCES District ID: 0636390
- NCES School ID: 063639006194
- Principal: Gay Buckland-Murray
- Teaching staff: 114.48 (on an FTE basis)
- Grades: 9–12
- Gender: Coeducational
- Enrollment: 2,360 (2023–2024)
- Student to teacher ratio: 20.46
- Campus size: 42 acres (17 ha)
- Campus type: Suburban
- Colors: Blue and Grey
- Mascot: Monty
- Accreditation: Western Association of Schools and Colleges
- Publication: Scot Scoop
- Newspaper: The Highlander
- Yearbook: Vistas
- Website: www.carlmonths.org

Carlmont High School is a public high school in Belmont, California, United States, serving grades 9–12 as part of the Sequoia Union High School District. Carlmont is a California Distinguished School.

Carlmont was founded in 1952 as "a school within a school" at Sequoia High School, with four hundred fifty freshman and sophomore students.

== History ==
The school's name is derives from the campus straddling the two adjacent cities of San Carlos and Belmont (thus the portmanteau of San Carlos + Belmont). Because this hilly area is referred to as "the highlands", the school team was named "The Scots", and the mascot is a kilted Scottish highland warrior, named Carl Monty. The Carlmont campus was built on 42 acres (17 ha) at a cost of about $2.5 million. Carlmont students come from Belmont, San Carlos, Redwood City, Redwood Shores, and East Palo Alto.

With the closure of Ravenswood High School in East Palo Alto in the late 1970s, instead of the school district complying with the Brown v. Board of Education (1954) and Mendez v. Westminster (1947), 2 US Supreme Court rulings that a student is legally required to attend the closest school to their home, the predominantly African-American, Hispanic and Pacific Islander students were forced by the District to be bused to other high schools in the Sequoia High School District, including Carlmont, which had a predominantly white population at the time.

=== Dangerous Minds ===
The novel My Posse Don't Do Homework by LouAnne Johnson and subsequent movie adaptation Dangerous Minds (1995) were based upon her experience as a teacher at Carlmont in the 1990s. In the film, the school was named Parkmont. Most of her students were African-Americans and Hispanics bused in to Carlmont from East Palo Alto, a town at the opposite end of the school district from Carlmont.

== Clubs and extracurriculars ==
=== Student newspaper ===
The school's student newspaper, Scot Scoop, publishes news, opinion articles, casual games, and editorial cartoons for the campus and surrounding community. In addition to Scot Scoop, a second news-magazine called Highlander publishes less frequent, longer articles. Scot Scoop has won the High School Online Pacemaker Award, a national journalism honor, seven times: in 2014, 2017, 2018, 2020, 2023, 2024, and 2025. It was also recognized as an SNO (Student News Online) "Distinguished Site" in 2025.

== Controversies ==
In May 2020, a Change.org petition was started by a Carlmont student, claiming Vice Principal Jennifer Cho had been involved in inappropriate relationships with male students at the school for the past decade, and demanding action. As a result of the petition an investigation started, and Cho was relieved from the school later that month and reassigned to work at the Sequoia Union High School District office, where she was placed on administrative leave pending the investigation's outcome. After the petition reached 5,400 signatures, the school district met on the matter on September 2, 2020 and recommended Cho be fired. Later in September, district superintendent Mary Streshly stepped down from her position, with improper handling of this case cited as one of the main reasons for this decision in a vote of no confidence against her.

== Demographics ==
As of the 2024–2025 school year, the campus housed a total of 2,360 students: 1,195 males (50.6%) and 1,165 females (49.4%). The same year, 220 (9.3%) of students were eligible for free or reduced-price lunch. Additionally, the student-teacher ratio was about one teacher for every twenty students.

Carlmont High School demographics (2024–25)
Demographic	Students	Percentage
White	960	40.7%
Asian	782	33.1%
Hispanic	360	15.3%
Two or more races	204	8.6%
Black	26	1.1%
Native American	17	0.7%
Pacific Islander	11	0.5%

== See also ==
- San Mateo County high schools
- Tierra Linda Middle School (located across the street from Carlmont High)
