= Belmont – Redwood Shores School District =

School district in California, United States

Location
- 2960 Hallmark Dr Belmont, CA, 94002; United States

District information
- Grades: KG–8
- Superintendent: Dan Deguara
- NCES District ID: 0604530

Students and staff
- Students: 4,314 (2019–20)

Other information
- Website: www.brssd.org

Belmont–Redwood Shores School District (BRSSD) is a K–8 school district in California that serves the Belmont and Redwood Shores areas.

The district's schools and their principals include:

- Central Elementary School – Charles Donovan
- Cipriani Elementary School – Sheila Walters
- Fox Elementary School – Taliah Carter
- Redwood Shores Elementary School – Kiara Herrera
- Sandpiper School – Gloria Higgins
- Nesbit Elementary-Middle School – Ryan Hansen-Vera
- Ralston Middle School – Sabrina Adler
