= Sequoia High School (Redwood City, California) =

Public school in Redwood City, California, US

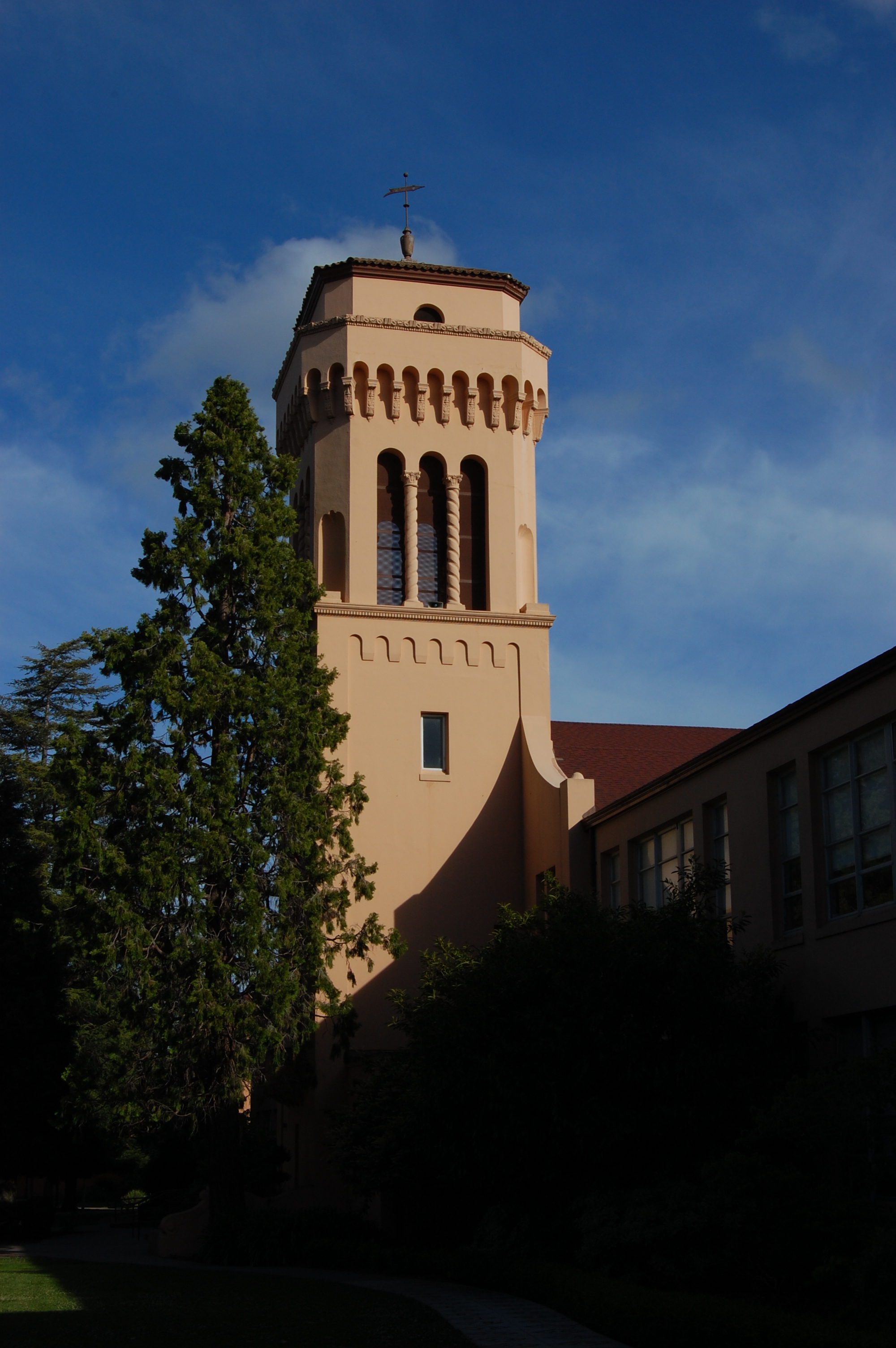

Location
- 1201 Brewster Avenue; Redwood City, California 94062; USA; 37°29′04″N 122°14′15″W

Information
- School type: Public high school
- Established: 1895
- School district: Sequoia Union High School District
- Superintendent: James Lianides
- NCES School ID: 063639006198
- Principal: Sean Priest (2014—present)
- Teaching staff: 105.09 (FTE)
- Grades: 9th-12th grade
- Age range: 13-19
- Enrollment: 1,862 (2024–25)
- Student to teacher ratio: 18.11
- Colors: Purple and White
- Slogan: UNALIYI: Place of Friends
- Fight song: Go Get 'em Cherokees
- Sports: Yes
- Mascot: Raven
- Team name: Ravens
- Rival: Woodside High School
- Newspaper: The Raven Report
- Yearbook: Unaliyi
- Website: www.sequoiahs.org
- Sequoia Union High School
- U.S. National Register of Historic Places
- U.S. Historic district
- Location within San Francisco Bay Area Location within California Location within the United States
- Area: 35 acres (14 ha)
- Built: 1923; 103 years ago
- Architectural style: Mission/Spanish Revival
- NRHP reference No.: 95000389
- Added to NRHP: April 7, 1995

Sequoia High School (established in 1895) is a public high school in downtown Redwood City, California, United States. Today, it is one of the few schools to offer the International Baccalaureate (IB) Diploma Programme within the San Francisco Bay Area.

== About ==
Sequoia High School is part of the Sequoia Union High School District. Most students attend middle school at Clifford School, Kennedy Middle School, McKinley Institute of Technology, or North Star Academy in Redwood City, or Central Middle School in San Carlos. The school maintains a vast array of clubs, extracurricular activities, and sports teams, in addition to a student newspaper, Yearbook team, and student government program.

The school grounds, located on 35 acres, include a Japanese Tea Garden which was built in 1929 by students, the performing arts venue Carrington Hall, and a number of historical trees, including the Giant Sequoia, Monkey-puzzle tree, Australian Tea tree, Ginkgo biloba trees, Cork Oak tree and many others. Classrooms are spread out among five main wings, including the newest "M" (music) wing, completed in 2018.

== History ==
Established in 1895, Sequoia is the oldest high school in San Mateo County, and was founded as a preparatory school for Stanford University. When the school was founded, it was the only high school on the Peninsula between San Francisco and Santa Clara. Initially when opening, the school occupied the third floor of the Redwood City Grammar School, with the two lower floors of the building for elementary and middle school students.

The present-day campus is located on the grounds of the former estate of Horace Hawes, author of the legislative bill that created San Mateo County. The present day campus, purchased for $80,000, was constructed in the 1920s and opened in 1924, in a Spanish Colonial Revival architecture style. The original campus buildings were designed by architects Coffey and Werner. The Argo Bell Tower campanile was built in 1923, and named after the former principal (from 1921 to 1948) Clarence Argo. Carrington Hall , the school auditorium, was named after a former music and art teacher at the school, Otis M. Carrington.

Remnants of the site's earlier owners, from over 115 years ago, are still visible on campus today, including an original set of concrete benches and walls on the eastern expanse of the school, built prior to 1905. The gazebo in the Japanese Tea Garden has been recently renovated, but remains in an identical location to a similar structure placed in the "rock garden" (today, the Tea Garden) in 1905.

The school was added to the National Register of Historic Places as a historic district in 1995, under its former name Sequoia Union High School. The campus is home to 128 classrooms, three gyms, a dance studio, a pool, a combined library–media center, and a woodshop.

On September 13, 2007, Governor Arnold Schwarzenegger visited Sequoia High School to sign bill SB 35, which prohibits persons who are under the age of 18 years from using a wireless telephone or other mobile service device while operating a motor vehicle.

On September 12, 2012, U.S. Secretary of Education Arne Duncan began a back-to-school tour on Sequoia's campus, praising the school as an example of a "model school" for its commitment to student success and Title I Academic Achievement award. Among other panelists at the discussion was Salman Khan, founder of Khan Academy.

== Team name and mascot ==
In the fall of 1925, Sequoia's mascot and athletic team names were selected as the Cherokees, in honor of the creator of the written Cherokee language, Sequoyah. The foreword of Sequoia's 1926 annual referenced the change, noting it was intended to "honor. . .the Cherokees, both past and present." In 2001, following presentations from students, teachers, and the school's Alumni Association, the board of trustees voted to change the mascot, while still retaining the Cherokees team name. The student body voted on the new mascot, with Ravens capturing the most votes, and the Scorpions second.

Beginning in 2018, several students, along with a faculty member and a few Sequoia parents, formed the "Ready for Ravens" initiative, arguing that continuing to use the Cherokee team name was hurtful to Native American tribes and perpetuated stereotypes about native people. Although many students and community members supported the change, others argued that the Cherokee name was, in fact, honoring the Cherokee tribe. The student group organized surveys, presented to the Board of Trustees, met with the Alumni Association, and produced an informative video capturing both sides of the issue. In early April 2019, after collecting survey responses from over 1,200 students, parents, faculty, and community members, the students presented to the Board of Trustees, who voted in favor of switching the team name to the Ravens.

In the months after, the administration painted new Ravens murals around campus. The 2020 Yearbook, commemorating Sequoia's 125th year, officially acknowledged the change and paid homage to the 1926 annual with an updated foreword reflecting the changes to the team name and mascot.

== Specialized programs ==
=== Advancement Via Individual Determination (AVID) ===
Sequoia provides classes, in partnership with the nationwide Advancement Via Individual Organization, to offer support for students related to taking advanced classes, time management, college applications, and more. The class is taught for one period every day, typically 7th period, as Sequoia operates on a schedule where only 0 and 7th period classes meet daily, a requirement for the AVID program. Students involved in AVID remain with the same teacher and classmates all four years of high school, and are expected to take notes in class daily, complete all college-preparatory classes with a "C" or higher, and meet with their teachers for progress reports. As the program is designed for students "in the middle" who could benefit from extra support, most students come from backgrounds that are historically underrepresented in post-secondary education, or who are the first in their family to attend college.

=== BUILD ===
Designed to prepare students for careers in business and entrepreneurship, since the 2008–2009 school year, Sequoia has offered a BUILD elective to 9th grade students, typically taken as a seventh class. With support from the BUILD organization, students learn business techniques and apply them to a small product that their team has engineered. In some years, the student teams sell their products to Sequoia students at lunch, and learn social media marketing strategies as they publicize their products digitally. (The school formerly offered a business/information technology program, with classes in computer repair, computer-aided design, and IB Information Technology in a Global Society, but due to low enrollment, the program ended after the 2017–2018 school year.)

=== Digital Arts Academy (DAA) ===
Offered as a small school-within-a-school to students, the Digital Arts Academy provides students the opportunity to explore careers within technology. It is the oldest continuous partnership academy in California, originally named the Electronic Arts Academy until its rebranding in 2015. Students apply in the spring of their 9th grade year and enroll in the program for their 10th through 12th grade years. The program is funded through a grant from the State of California that is matched by the District and industry partners, allowing classes to be capped at 25 students and providing teachers with resources that can be used to infuse the curriculum with technology and provide extra support to students. Within the Academy, students take four classes per year: English, Science, Social Studies, and a technology elective (Digital Filmmaking, Multimedia I, and Multimedia II). Besides gaining experience with professional software, students are also paired with a mentor that works in Silicon Valley, allowing them to learn job skills and business etiquette through one-on-one activities, workshops, job shadows, and mock interviews.

=== Health Careers Academy (HCA) ===
Similar to the Digital Arts Academy, the Health Careers Academy is a small learning community for 10th through 12th grade students at Sequoia, focused on preparing students for college-level education in health care fields or a career in the health care industry following graduation. Teachers "loop" with students and move with them through their years in the program within a specific subject area, such as English, Science, Social Studies, and Career Technical Education. The program provides students real-world experiences in health care fields through professional mentors, certification programs, and internships at local companies. In the 2019–2020 school year, students attended a field trip to the Redwood City Fire Department, where they practiced Community Emergency Response Team (CERT) skills and performed mock emergency situations. Through partnerships with local organizations, students in the academy also host various events on campus, including an annual Health Fair and a youth heart screening. On March 4, 2019, the HCA was recognized by the California Department of Education at a conference in Sacramento, where it was selected as one of seven distinguished academies in the state, out of nearly 400 other programs.

=== International Baccalaureate Programme (IB) ===
Sequoia High School began offering the International Baccalaureate Programme in February 2002, under Principal Morgan Marchbanks. Although the official IB curriculum does not begin until junior year, students can take ICAP ("International College Advancement Program") classes in freshman and sophomore year. Sequoia High School offers a wide range of IB classes for students in English, history, math, science, electives, and languages. Students can choose to take one or several IB classes to pursue an IB certificate, or they can choose to partake in the full IB Diploma, which includes taking an IB class in each of the six main subject areas, taking an additional Theory of Knowledge (TOK) class, writing a 4,000-word Extended Essay (EE) research paper, and completing Creativity, Activity, and Service (CAS) hours. The International Baccalaureate Programme allows the students a wide range of opportunities because the course material is worldwide. It prepares them for college as the course is rigorous, but helps each student adapt to the work load. At the end of the last year, similar to the AP test, the students take IB tests which go on throughout the month of May. As of the 2025–2026 school year, Sequoia offers 18 unique IB classes.

Between 2014 and 2017, Sequoia High School was one of five high schools in the U.S. selected to participate in an educational improvement project funded by the Michael and Susan Dell Foundation, with the goal of increasing the number of low-income students participating and succeeding in Sequoia's IB program.

== Statistics ==
=== Demographics ===
Population of racial identities by percent of enrollment:
	2015–2016	2020–2021	2021–2022	2022–2023	2023–2024	2024–2025
White	29.4%	31.4%	--	32.3%	31.7%	29.3%
Hispanic	59.4%	55.9%	--	57.4%	58.6%	61.1%
Asian	4.6%	5.5%	--	5.4%	5.0%	4.5%
African American	1.3%	1.3%	--	0.9%	0.9%	0.8%
Pacific Islander	2.2%	1.3%	--	0.8%	0.9%	0.8%
American Indian	0.2%	0.2%	--	0.4%	0.5%	0.8%
Two or More Races	2.9%	4.3%	--	2.8%	2.4%	2.9%

Other data:
	2020–2021	2021–2022	2022–2023	2023–2024
English language learners	16.8%	--	20.2%	18.5%
Foster youth	0.3%	--	0.1%	0.1%
Receive special education services	15.7%	--	14.4%	15.3%
Socioeconomically disadvantaged	46.2%	--	45.1%	45.1%

=== Population and graduation rates ===
Population by Grade Level
	2014–2015	2015–2016	2016–2017	2017–2018	2018–2019	2019–2020	2020–2021	2021–2022	2022–2023	2023–2024
Grade 9	536	511	546	546	525	483	515	428	452	463
Grade 10	551	552	553	550	541	548	483	507	459	457
Grade 11	490	540	548	541	515	528	529	481	512	466
Grade 12	558	540	535	496	486	482	492	529	486	517
Total	2,135	2,143	2,182	2,133	2,067	2,041	2,019	1,945	1,909	1,903
Graduation Rate	--	--	83.4%	86.6%	84.3%	89.9%	88.9%	88.2%	88.5%	86.4%

=== Standardized testing ===
SAT Scores by Year
	2018–2019		2019–2020		2020–2021	
	Evidence-Based Reading and Writing Average	Math Average	Evidence-Based Reading and Writing Average	Math Average	Evidence-Based Reading and Writing Average	Math Average
Sequoia High	572	584	575	588	636	660
Statewide	534	531	531	524	527	530

2013 Academic Performance Index
2009 Base API	2013 Growth API	Growth in the API from 2009 to 2013
740	801	61

== Notable alumni ==
=== Athletes ===
- Gary Beban (class of 1964), Heisman Trophy winner in 1967, briefly played professional football for the Washington Redskins
- Spencer Folau (class of 1991), 2000 Super Bowl championship with the Baltimore Ravens
- James Gaughran (class of 1950), Olympic water polo athlete, Melbourne 1956, member of the United States Water Polo Hall of Fame and Stanford University water polo and swimming coach
- John Harlin II (class of 1953), American mountaineer, famous for Harlin's Route, north face of the Eiger
- Will "Powerhouse Hobbs" Hobson, professional wrestler signed with WWE
- Charles Johnson, professional basketball player for the Golden State Warriors
- Paul McClellan, Major League Baseball (MLB) player for the San Francisco Giants
- Paul Noce, former MLB player with the Chicago Cubs
- Dick Sharon (class of 1968), former MLB player
- Kaito Streets (class of 2012), Olympic fencer for the Japanese Olympic Team.
- Dick Stuart (class of 1951), former MLB player with the Pittsburgh Pirates
- Bob Svihus (class of 1961), played with the Oakland Raiders and the New York Jets from 1965–1973
- Tim Twietmeyer, ultramarathon runner, best known for completing the Western States Endurance Run more than 25 times in under 24 hours.
- Daniel Aguirre, professional soccer player. Former La Galaxy (2021-2024) player. Currently playing for CD Guadalajara Chivas (2025-Present).

=== Arts and entertainment ===
- Eric Dane (in school as Eric Feldman 1987–1990), actor on Grey's Anatomy and Marley & Me
- Tim Genis (class of 1984), Boston Symphony lead timpanist
- Kenny Ortega (class of 1968), director and choreographer for the High School Musical franchise
- Lydia Pense (class of 1966), musician and singer in the band Cold Blood; was in a Sequoia High School band called The Dimensions (in 1963)
- Ronnie Day (class of 2006, graduated early to focus on his music career), musician
- Joyce MacKenzie (class of 1943), actress

=== Business ===
- Ray Dolby (class of 1951), founder of Dolby Laboratories
- Gordon Moore (class of 1946), co-founder of Intel Corporation, best known for Moore's Law
- Jeffrey Wold (Class of 1986), CEO of WIWA LLC

=== Politics ===
- William Royer (class of 1938), member of the U.S. House of Representatives

=== Scholar and education ===
- Donna Boutelle (class of 1950), historian, professor at Cal State Long Beach
- Roger "Denny" Hansen (class of 1953), international relations scholar and subject of Calvin Trillin's Remembering Denny
- Steven G. Krantz (class of 1967), scholar, mathematician and author of more than 50 books

== See also ==
- Redwood City School District (RCSD)
- San Mateo County high schools
