= San Mateo County Community College District =

School district in California

- Established: 1922; 104 years ago
- Budget: $527.9 million (2023–24)
- Chancellor: Melissa Moreno
- Students: 45,000
- Location: San Mateo, California, United States; 37.531243°N 122.337648°W
- Campus: Cañada College; Redwood City; College of San Mateo; San Mateo; Skyline College; San Bruno
- Accreditation: Western Association of Schools and Colleges
- Website: smccd.edu

The San Mateo County Community College District is a community college system in California, United States. It includes three institutions: College of San Mateo in San Mateo, Cañada College in Redwood City, and Skyline College in San Bruno. The district serves more than 25,000 students each day with both day and evening classes.

== History ==
San Mateo Junior College was founded in 1922, and the first classes started on August 22 in a building shared with San Mateo High School on Baldwin Avenue and San Mateo Drive (then called Griffith Avenue). The first student was Marjorie Brace, who could not attend Stanford because of the high cost of tuition. Julio Bortolazzo is credited with the expansion of what had become the College of San Mateo (CSM) into the three-college district. In 1956, he formed a 27-member Citizens Committee to study potential sites for a new campus for CSM, which by then occupied the training facility originally constructed for the United States Merchant Marine during World War II at Coyote Point. The final report filed by the committee concluded that San Mateo County needed more than one community college.

County voters overwhelmingly approved a $5.9 million bond issue in 1957 based on Committee recommendations, which provided funds to purchase the present-day College Heights campus for CSM as well as a 111-acre (45 ha) site near Skyline and Sharp Park in San Bruno, which would become Skyline College. In 1962, the 131-acre (53 ha) parcel for Cañada College on the border of Redwood City and Woodside was purchased. Voters approved another bond of $12.8 million in March 1964, which provided funds to construct Cañada College (opened 1968) and Skyline College (opened 1969).

SB 850, introduced by State Senator Marty Block in 2014, allowed up to 15 community college districts within California to offer a single four-year baccalaureate degree program for a professional qualification that did not compete with existing four-year universities. SMCCCD officials pushed to have the district included in the pilot program, and the California Community Colleges Board of Governors selected the Respiratory Care program at Skyline to participate.

A 2015 investigation into Chancellor Ron Galatolo's expense reports showed that he had purchased alcohol with several meals, in violation of the District's strict no-alcohol policy; SMCCCD updated its administrative procedures three months later to allow senior administrators to purchase alcohol during business events. In mid-August 2019, Chancellor Galatolo stepped down and was named Chancellor Emeritus, a position with the same pay, while he leads a feasibility study for a California State University (CSU) campus on the San Francisco Peninsula. According to the settlement signed by Galatolo and SMCCCD, the Chancellor Emeritus position will end on March 31, 2022. Shortly thereafter, the San Mateo County District Attorney's office executed search warrants for materials belonging to the district and Galatolo. These searches were related to "allegations of harassment and improper handling of construction contracts." Galatolo was subsequently placed on administrative leave in September 2019, and Michael Claire, the president of the College of San Mateo, was named acting SMCCCD Chancellor. After evaluating several candidates, Claire was named Chancellor in April 2020. Galatolo was fired in February 2021 for failing to disclose gifts he had received while serving as Chancellor; the District's cooperation with the ongoing District Attorney office's investigation revealed "the apparent use of public funds for retirement incentives, undisclosed personal relationships with vendors for the District, and undisclosed receipt of gifts from contractors who work for the District. These gifts appear to have included high-end travel, concert tickets and meals".

State Senator Jerry Hill and Assemblymember Kevin Mullin sent a letter in April 2019 to the California Senate Budget Committee requesting $1 million to study the feasibility of expanding CSU to the Cañada College campus, tentatively named CSU Silicon Valley. They stated there was a need for a permanent four-year public university in San Mateo County for students unable to commute to CSU East Bay, San Francisco State, or San Jose State due to housing and traffic constraints. The state legislature authorized a $4 million study that year to determine if a 24th CSU campus should be built to alleviate overcrowding, and where it could be sited; Cañada College was one of seven sites evaluated; because projected demand in 2035 would be met by plans to expand the existing campuses, the cost of a new campus serving 7,500 full-time equivalent (FTE) students would not be justified, but a smaller "University Center" model enrolling 500 FTE could be implemented within two years at Cañada.

== Governance ==
The district serves San Mateo County and is governed by a six-member board of trustees. Five voting trustees are elected by county residents to serve a four-year term and one nonvoting student trustee is elected by students for a one-year term.

In November 2018, two trustees were elected according to area (geographical district) in Areas 2 and 4 instead of from the county at-large. The remaining three trustee area elections will be held in 2020. The California Voting Rights Act of 2001 challenged the legality of at-large elections, leading to the adoption of area-based elections. Various maps were drawn, and Scenario 4, the one selected, offered "areas ... substantially equal in population and ... cohesive, contiguous territory to the extent possible in compliance with legal requirements". The change to area-based elections was approved by the board on October 11, 2017, on a 3–2 vote, with Richard Holober and Dave Mandelkern opposed.

=== Leadership ===
SMCCD Board of Trustees
Trustee area	Trustee	Term	Term end	Notes
Area 1	Lisa Petrides	2020	2024	
Area 2	Mike Guingona	2022	2026	Vice president
Area 3	Wayne Lee	2020	2024	
Area 4	Richard Holober	2022	2026	
Area 5	John Pimentel	2020	2024	President
Student trustee	Arthur Veloso	2023	2024	

Trustee areas
Area	Cities and census-designated places served
1	Atherton, El Granada, Half Moon Bay, La Honda, Ladera, Montara, Moss Beach, Pacifica, Portola Valley, San Carlos, West Menlo Park, Woodside
2	Brisbane, Broadmoor, Colma, Daly City, South San Francisco
3	Burlingame, Hillsborough, Millbrae, San Bruno
4	Belmont, Highlands-Baywood Park, Foster City, San Mateo
5	East Palo Alto, Emerald Lake Hills, Menlo Park, North Fair Oaks, Redwood City

SMCCD chancellors
Name	Began	Ended	Notes
Lois Callahan	1991	1997	Retired in 1997
Earl "Joe" Johnson	1997	2001	Resigned to accept position at Clackamas Community College
Ron Galatolo	2001	2019	Resigned under investigation of corruption charges. Fired from chancellor emeritus position in 2021 following the completion of the investigation. Later charged with 23 felony corruption charges.
Michael Claire	2019	2023	Served as interim chancellor in 2019. Named as chancellor in 2020. Retired in 2023
Melissa Moreno	2023	Present	Served as interim chancellor in 2023. Named as chancellor in 2024

San Mateo County Community College District campuses
1 Skyline College
2 College of San Mateo
3 Cañada College

== Campuses ==
=== Skyline College ===
Skyline offers more than 100 associate degree and certificate programs, including 29 associate degrees for transfer. The mission of the college is to empower and transform a global community of learners.

=== College of San Mateo ===
- College of San Mateo offers distance learning via their telecourses. Telecourses are preproduced television courses broadcast on KCSM-TV and are available for at the media center and the library. Telecourses are available to all students within the San Mateo County Community College District.
- KCSM-TV was a membership community supported station located on the CSM Campus. On July 31, 2018, ownership and operation for KCSM-TV was transferred from the District, and the station call sign became KPJK.
- KCSM FM is a community supported station.
- KCSM Theatre features plays, musicians and supports the performing arts.
- Community Education offers a wide range of programs to meet community needs and interests.

=== Cañada College ===
Cañada College is a public community college in Redwood City, California.

==== University Center ====
The University Center at Cañada College was established in 2001 as a new model to provide four-year college degree programs.

Cañada College is the only community college in the state of California with a University Center which came into being through special state legislation sponsored by Assemblymember Lou Papan and with the support of the San Mateo County Community College District. This was a way to extend higher learning to peninsula residents who could not travel to the participating universities.

San Francisco State University

- Nursing - Bachelor of Science

Notre Dame de Namur University

- Business Administration - Bachelor of Science
- Human Services - Bachelor of Science
- Psychology - Bachelor of Arts

Arizona State University

- Family and Human Development - Bachelor of Science
- Educational Studies - Bachelor of Arts

== Notable alumni ==
- MLB star Moisés Alou attended Canada College in the 1980s.
- Comedian Dana Carvey attended College of San Mateo and ran on their cross-country team in the mid-1970s.
- Congresswoman Anna Eshoo
