= San Mateo County, California =

County in California, United States

San Mateo County
- County
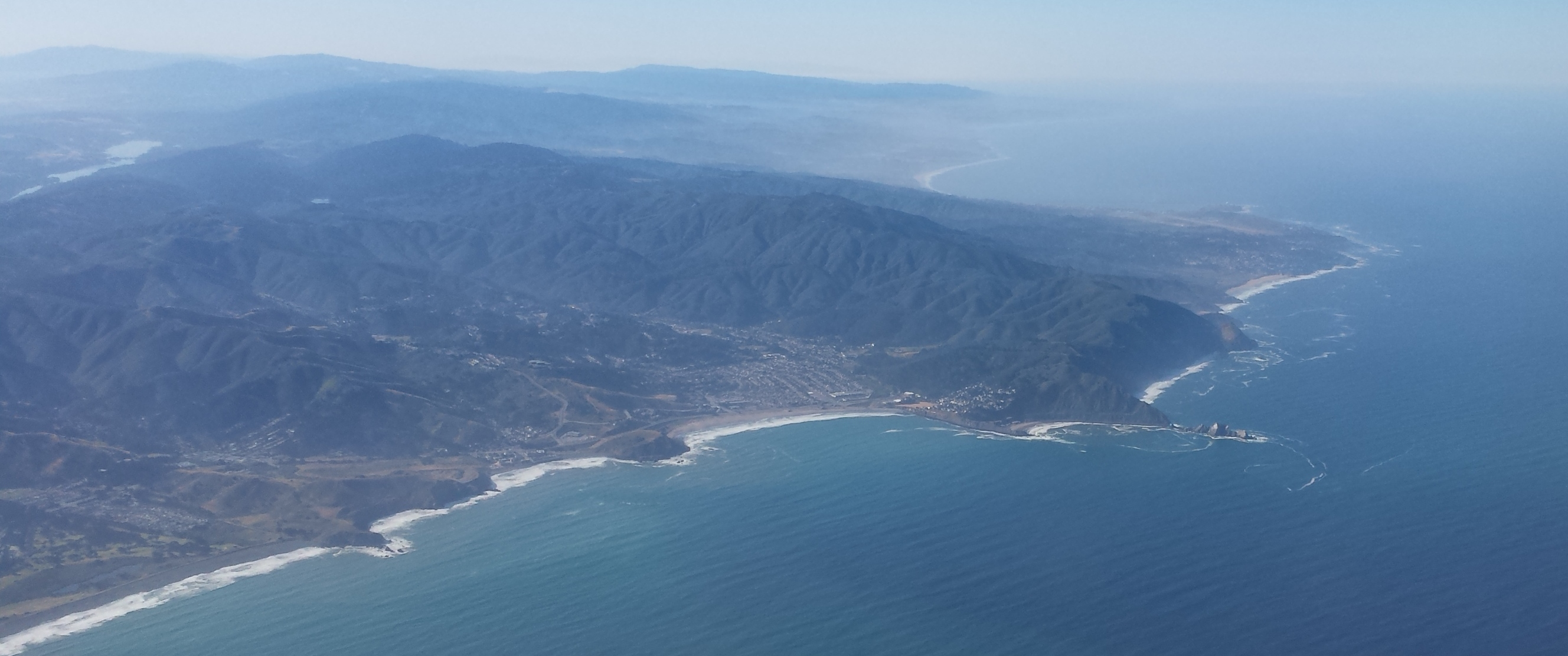
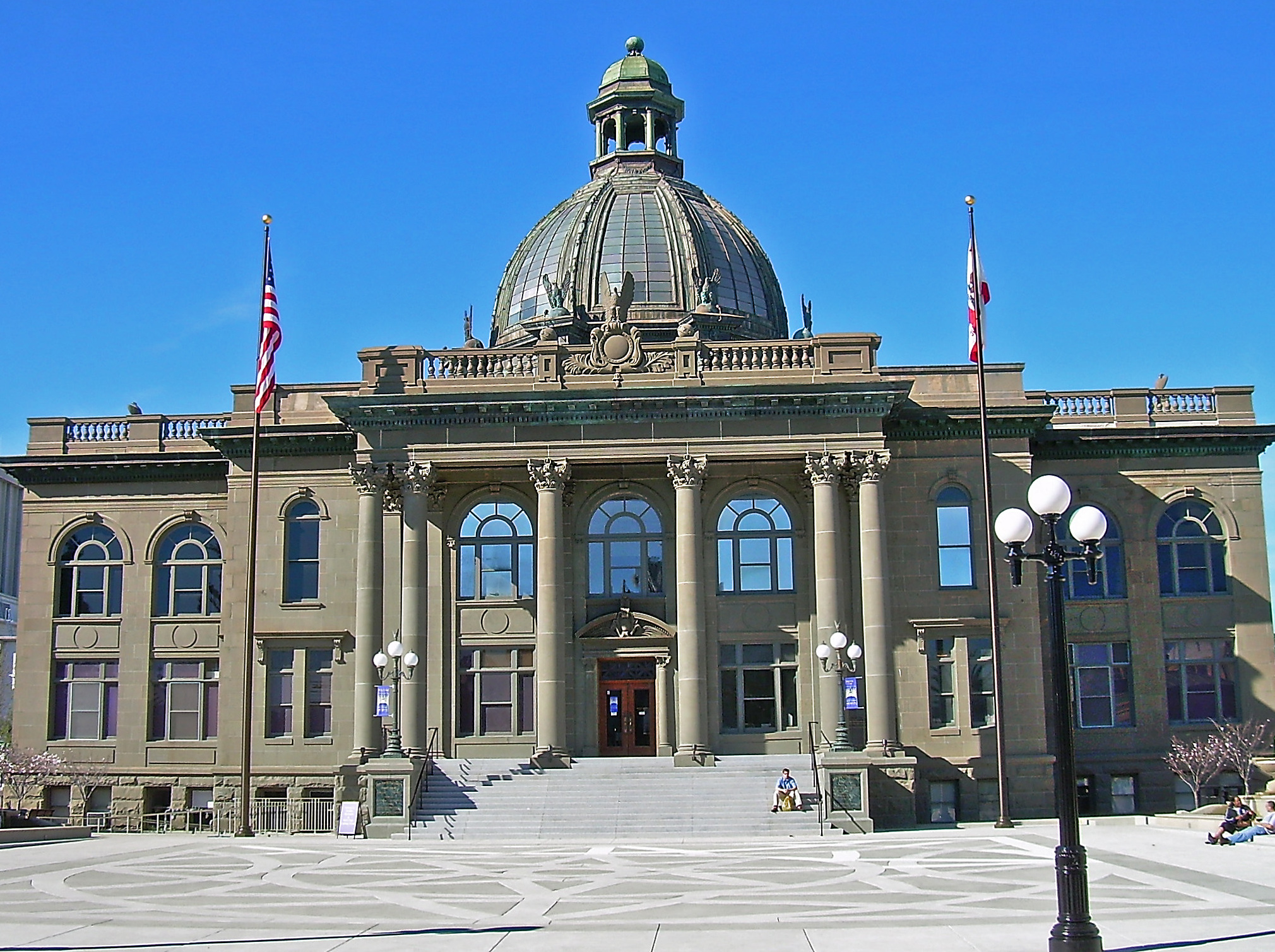
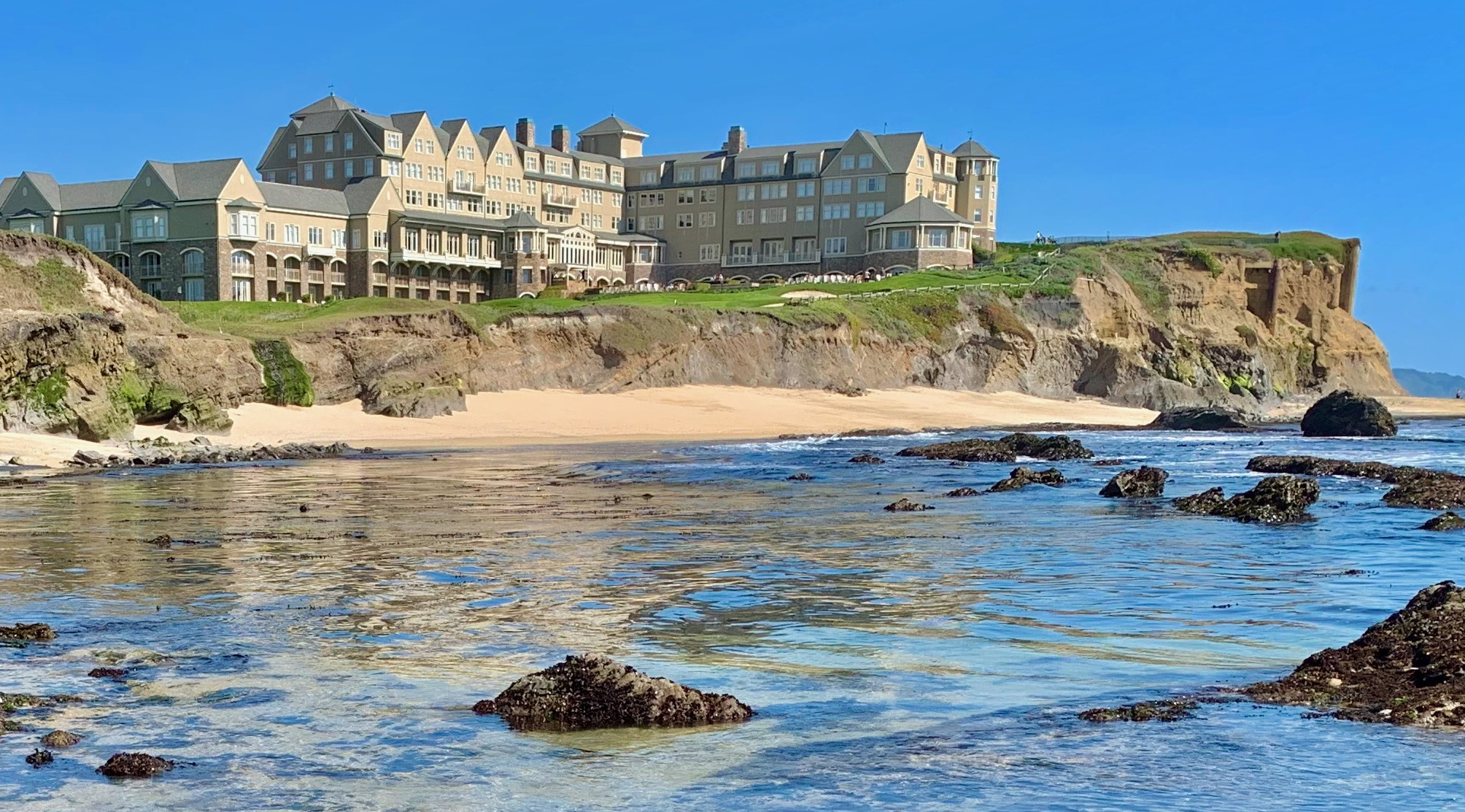
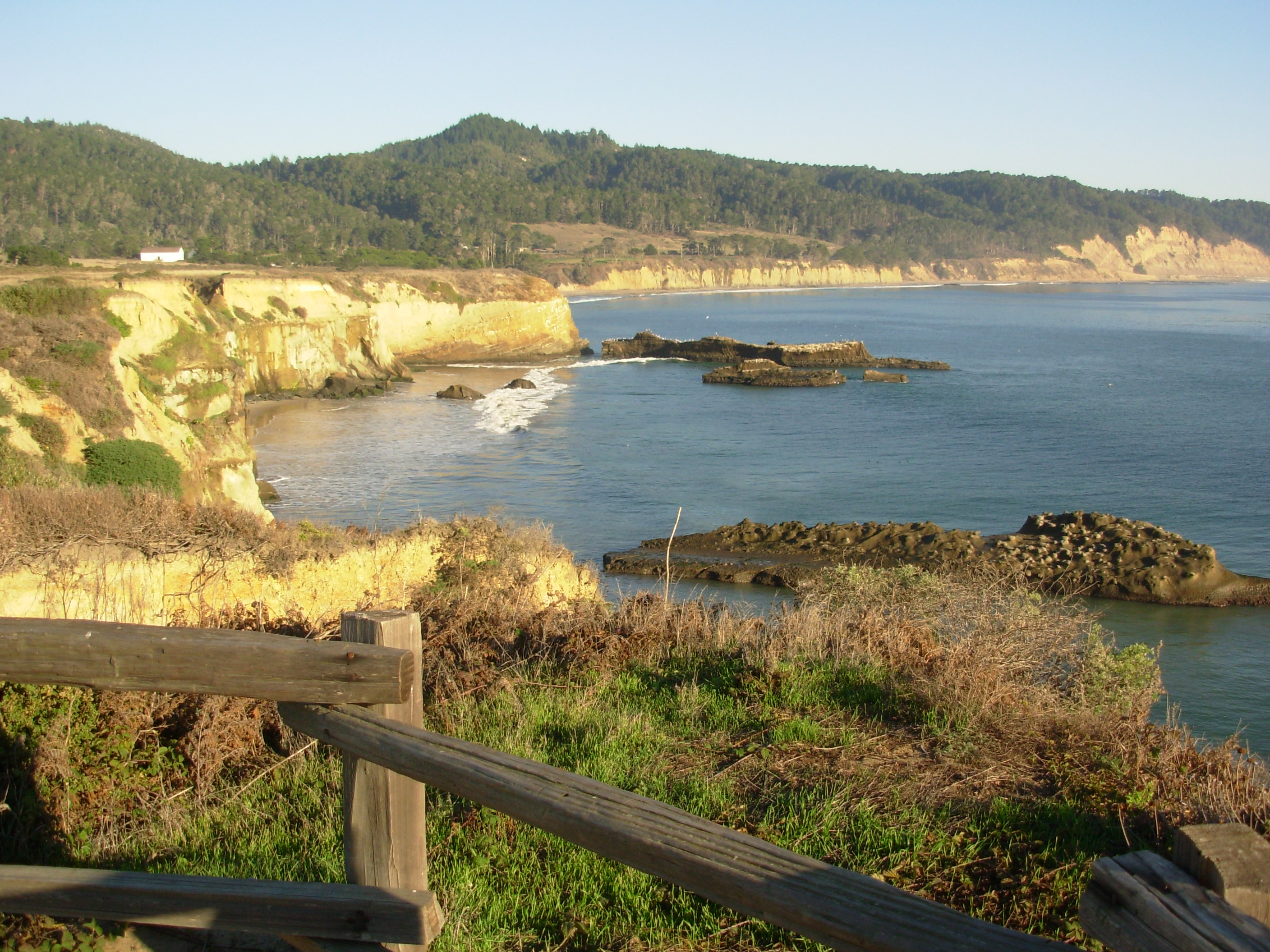
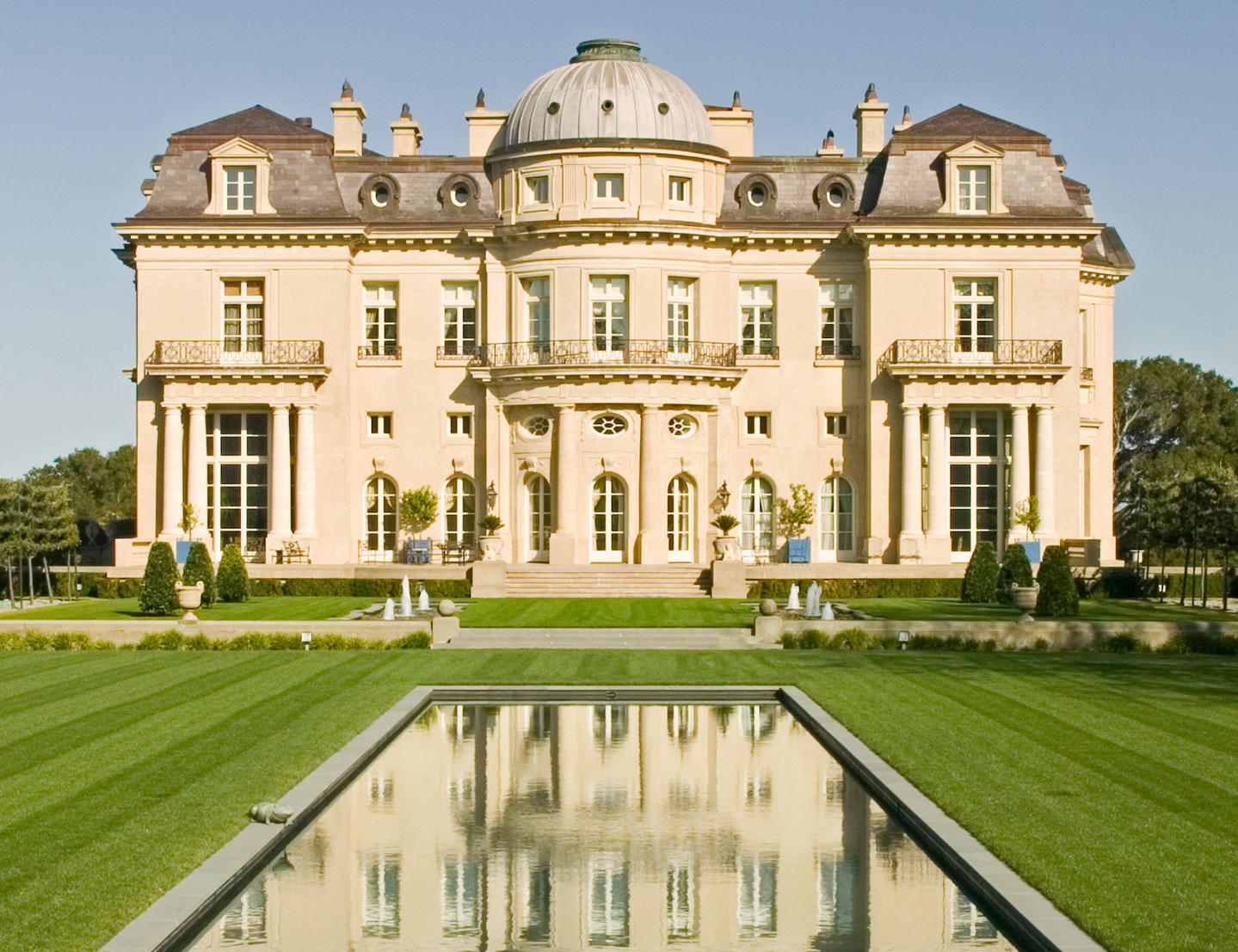
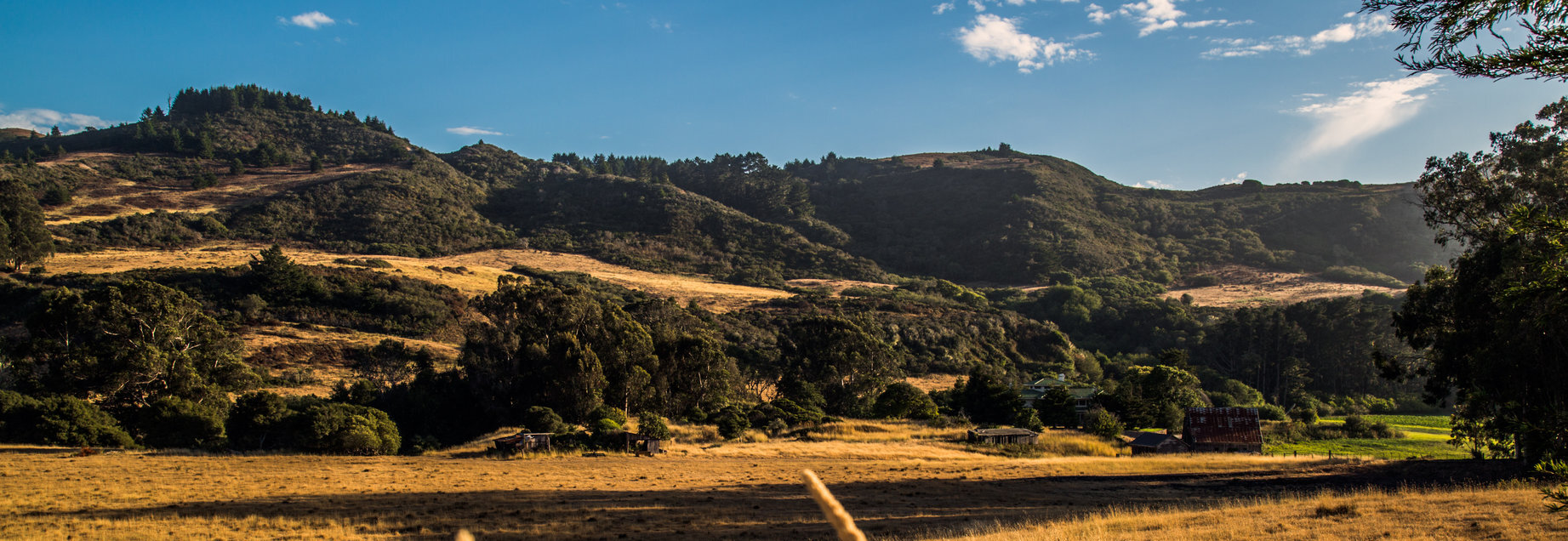
- Pacifica on the Californian Coast Redwood City Half Moon Bay Año Nuevo Hillsborough La Honda-San Gregorio

- Seal
- Motto: All of California in One County
- Interactive map of San Mateo County
- Location in California
- Coordinates: 37.44°N 122.36°W
- Country: United States
- State: California
- Incorporated: April 19, 1856
- Named for: Saint Matthew (English translation)
- County seat and largest city by area: Redwood City
- Largest city by population: San Mateo

Government
  - Type: Council–CEO
  - Body: Board of Supervisors
  - President: Noelia Corzo
  - Vice President: Ray Mueller
  - Board of Supervisors: Supervisors: Jackie Speier; Noelia Corzo; Ray Mueller; Lisa Gauthier; David Canepa
  - County executive officer: Mike Callagy

Area
  - Total: 744 sq mi (1,930 km^{2})
  - Land: 448 sq mi (1,160 km^{2})
  - Water: 293 sq mi (760 km^{2})
- Highest elevation: 2,603 ft (793 m)

Population (April 1, 2020)
  - Total: 764,442
  - Estimate (2025): 743,568 ▼
  - Density: 1,704/sq mi (658/km^{2})

GDP
  - Total: $202.488 billion (2023)
- Time zone: UTC-8 (Pacific Time Zone)
  - Summer (DST): UTC-7 (Pacific Daylight Time)
- Area codes: 415/628, 650
- FIPS code: 06-081
- GNIS feature ID: 277305
- Congressional districts: 15th, 16th
- Website: smcgov.org

San Mateo County, (Note: (/ˌsæn məˈteɪ.oʊ/ SAN mə-TAY-oh)) officially the County of San Mateo, is a county located in the U.S. state of California. As of the 2020 United States census, the population was 764,442. Redwood City is the county seat, the third-most populated city in the county after Daly City and San Mateo.

San Mateo County is included in the San Francisco–Oakland–Fremont, CA MSA (metropolitan statistical area), Silicon Valley, and is part of the San Francisco Bay Area, the nine counties bordering San Francisco Bay. As of 2020, it has a median household income of $128,091, the fourth-highest household income of any county in the nation behind Loudoun County, Virginia, Falls Church, Virginia, and Santa Clara County, California.

The county covers most of the San Francisco Peninsula. The county is predominantly suburban and is home to many corporate campuses.

== History ==
San Mateo County was formed in 1856 upon the division of San Francisco County, one of the state's 18 original counties established at California statehood in 1850. Until 1856, San Francisco's city limits extended west to Divisadero Street and Castro Street, and south to 20th Street. In 1856, the California state government divided the county. A straight line was then drawn across the tip of the San Francisco Peninsula just north of San Bruno Mountain. Everything south of the line became the new San Mateo County while everything north of the line became the new consolidated City and County of San Francisco. San Mateo County was officially organized on April 18, 1857, under a bill introduced by Senator T.G. Phelps. The 1857 bill defined the southern boundary of San Mateo County as following the south branch of San Francisquito Creek to its source in the Santa Cruz Mountains and thence due west to the Pacific Ocean, and named Redwood City as the county seat. San Mateo County then annexed part of northern Santa Cruz County in March 1868, including Pescadero and Pigeon Point.

Although the formation bill named Redwood City the county seat, a May 1856 election marked by "unblushing frauds perpetuated on an unorganized and wholly unprotected community by thugs and ballot stuffers from San Francisco" named Belmont the county seat. The election results were declared illegal and the county government was moved to Redwood City, with land being donated from the original Pulgas Grant for the county government on February 27, 1858. Redwood City's status as county seat was upheld in two successive elections in May 1861 and December 9, 1873, defeating San Mateo and Belmont. Another election in May 1874 named San Mateo the county seat, but the state supreme court overturned that election on February 24, 1875, and the county seat has remained at Redwood City ever since.

San Mateo County bears the Spanish name for Saint Matthew. As a place name, San Mateo appears as early as 1776 in the diaries of Anza and Font. Several local geographic features were also designated San Mateo on early maps including variously: a settlement, an arroyo, a headland jutting into the Pacific (Point Montara), and a large land holding (Rancho San Mateo). Until about 1850, the name appeared as San Matheo.

=== Japanese Americans in San Mateo ===
The Japanese first arrived in San Mateo County and were part of a group guided by Ambassador Tomomi Iwakura in 1872. A number of male Japanese students came to San Mateo to learn English and many other helpful skills to bring back to Japan. These students were also some of the first Japanese to join American students in the Belmont School for Boys. These students had to work for their housing and food before classes and in the evenings. Many of the first Japanese immigrants were able to find jobs as gardeners and landscapers in San Mateo. Most of them had a good educational background from their homelands, but their lack of knowledge of the English language made it difficult for them to find other jobs in the beginning.

== Geography ==
According to the U.S. Census Bureau, the county has a total area of 741 square miles (1,920 km^{2}), of which 448 square miles (1,160 km^{2}) is land and 293 square miles (760 km^{2}) (40%) is water. It is the third-smallest county in California by land area. A number of bayside watercourses drain the eastern part of the county including San Bruno Creek and Colma Creek. Streams draining the western county include Frenchmans Creek, Pilarcitos Creek, Naples Creek, Arroyo de en Medio, and Denniston Creek. These streams originate along the northern spur of the Santa Cruz Mountains that run through the county. The northern and eastern parts of the county are very heavy densely populated with largely urban and suburban areas, with many of its cities as edge-cities for the Bay Area, while the deep south and the west-central parts of the county are less densely populated with more rural environment and coastal beaches areas.

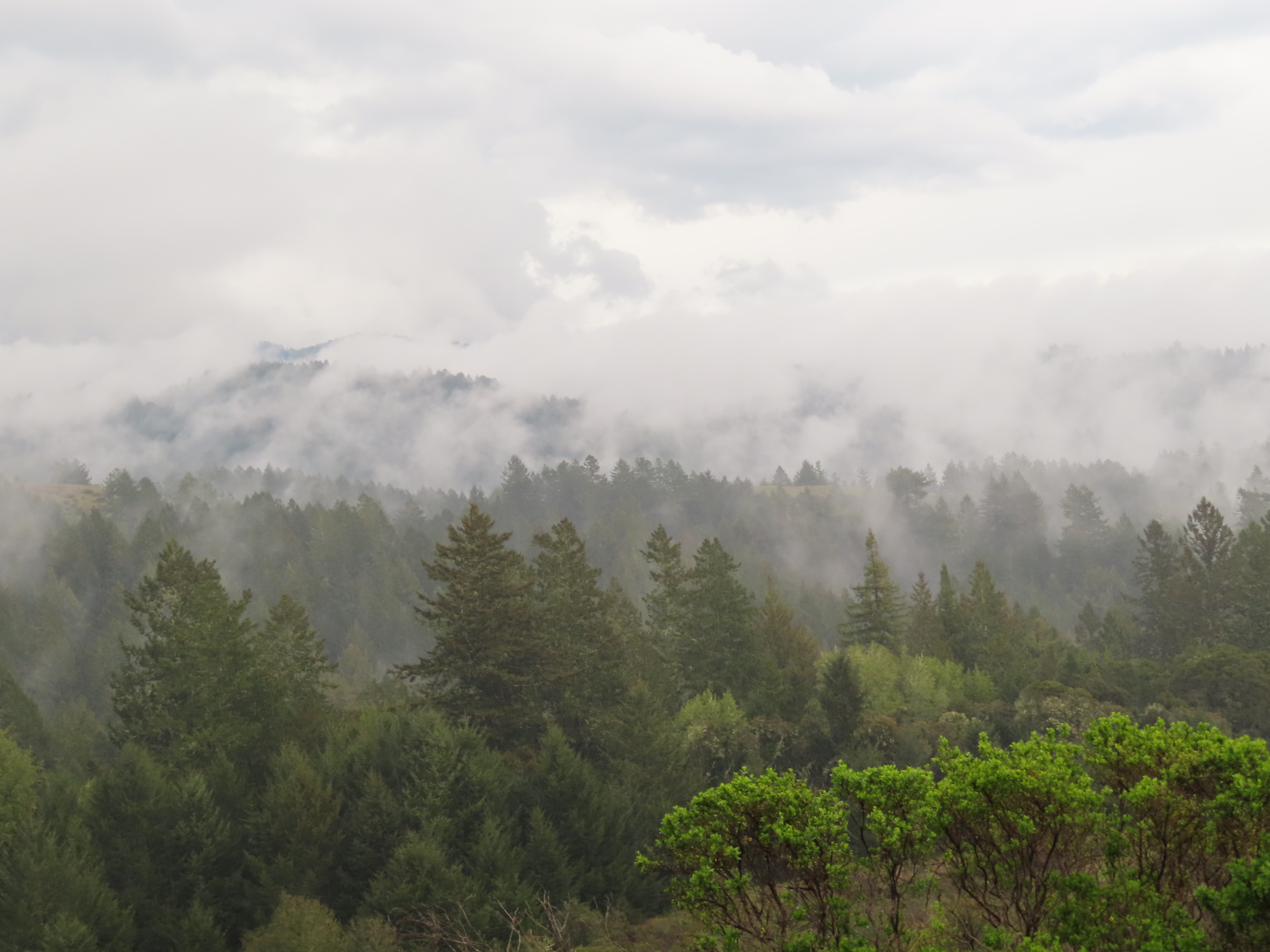
The Santa Cruz Mountains cross through San Mateo County. In comparison to the rest of the county, the area is quite rural and forested.

=== Features ===
San Mateo County straddles the San Francisco Peninsula, with the Santa Cruz Mountains running its entire length. The county encompasses a variety of habitats, including estuarine, marine, oak woodland, redwood forest, coastal scrub and oak savannah. There are numerous species of wildlife present, especially along the San Francisco Bay estuarine shoreline, San Bruno Mountain, Fitzgerald Marine Reserve and the forests on the Montara Mountain block. Several creeks discharge to the San Francisco Bay, including San Mateo Creek and Laurel Creek, and several coastal streams discharge to the Pacific Ocean, such as Frenchmans Creek and San Vicente Creek.

Año Nuevo State Marine Conservation Area and Greyhound Rock State Marine Conservation Area are two adjoining marine protected areas off the coast of San Mateo County. Like underwater parks, these marine protected areas help conserve ocean wildlife and marine ecosystems.

=== Flora and fauna ===
The county is home to several endangered species including the San Francisco garter snake and the San Bruno elfin butterfly, both of which are endemic to San Mateo County. The endangered Ridgway's Rail is also found on the shores of San Francisco Bay, in the cities of Belmont and San Mateo. The endangered wildflower Hickman's potentilla is found near the Pacific Ocean on the lower slopes of Montara Mountain. The endangered wildflowers White-rayed pentachaeta, Pentachaeta bellidiflora, San Mateo Woolly Sunflower, Eriophyllum latilobum, Marin Dwarf Flax, Hesperolinon congestum and the San Mateo Thornmint, Acanthomintha duttonii, are found in the vicinity of the Crystal Springs Reservoir.

In May 2014, a California condor was spotted near Pescadero, a coastal community south of San Francisco—it was the first California condor spotted in San Mateo County since 1904. The condor, tagged with the number "597", and also known as "Lupine", is one of 439 condors living in the wild or captivity in California, Baja California and Arizona. The three-year-old female flew more than 100 miles (160 km) north from Pinnacles National Park, in San Benito County, on May 30, and landed on a private, forested property near Pescadero, on the San Mateo County Coast, where it was photographed by a motion-activated wildlife camera. Harold Heath, professor emeritus, of Stanford University was responsible for the 1904 sighting, 1 mile (1.6 km) west of the university campus.

Pumas (Puma concolor), also known as cougars or mountain lions, roam the county.

Tule elk (Cervus canadensis nannodes) were native to San Mateo County and among the "favored foods" of the Ohlone people based on ethnohistoric and archeological evidence there. The discovery of two elk specimens made news in 1962, one a royal elk (royal elk bulls have six tines per antler) from a peat bog excavated in Pacifica's historic Laguna Alta, and now in the Museum of Vertebrate Zoology collection. These may date from the time of Spanish settlement. Laguna Alta lay just south of the Interstate 280 and Skyline Boulevard intersection, east of Mussel Rock. The California Academy of Sciences also has an elk skull fragment collected one mile inland from the mouth of Purisima Creek in 1951. Additional coastal elk remains dating from the Middle and Late Periods in Northern California were found in at least five more late Holocene archeological sites in San Mateo County: SMA-115 (Montara State Beach site), SMA-118 (Bean Hollow State Beach site), SMA-244 (Butano Ridge site), SMA-97 (Año Nuevo Creek site) and SMA-218 (Año Nuevo State Reserve site). On the eastern side of the San Francisco Peninsula, elk remains were also unearthed at multiple archaeological sites along San Francisquito Creek.

=== National protected areas ===
- Don Edwards San Francisco Bay National Wildlife Refuge (part)
- Golden Gate National Recreation Area (part)

=== Marine protected area ===
- Montara State Marine Reserve & Pillar Point State Marine Conservation Area

=== County parks ===
San Mateo County Parks
- Parks and open spaces
- Trails
- Historic sites

The County of San Mateo Parks Department operates 22 parks, trails, and historic sites spread throughout the county; the first, Memorial Park, was dedicated on July 4, 1924. The County Superintendent of Schools, Roy Cloud, had visited a one-room schoolhouse in Harrison Canyon as part of his duties; at the time, it was thickly forested with old-growth redwoods and he was alarmed when he learned they were scheduled to be logged. He petitioned the County Board of Supervisors to purchase the land instead. The Recreation Commission was not created until 1932, and the park was improved as part of the Works Progress Administration efforts starting in 1935.

San Mateo County Parks
No.	Name	Image	Est.	Size	City	Ref.
1	Coyote Point: Marina; Recreation Area		1963	149 + 538 acres 60 + 218 ha (Note: 149 acres of land, 538 acres underwater)	San Mateo/Burlingame	
2	Crystal Springs: San Andreas; Sawyer Camp; Crystal Springs			17.5 mi 28.2 km	Burlingame	
3	Devil's Slide			1.3 mi 2.1 km	Pacifica/Montara	
4	Edgewood		1980	467 acres 189 ha	Redwood City	
5	Fitzgerald (Note: Wholly contained within the Montara State Marine Reserve)		1969		Moss Beach	
6	Flood			21 acres 8.5 ha	Menlo Park	
7	Friendship			<1 acre 0.40 ha	Redwood City	
8	Huddart		1948	974 acres 394 ha	Woodside	
9	Junipero Serra		1960	103 acres 42 ha	San Bruno	
10	Memorial		1924	673 acres 272 ha	Loma Mar	
11	Mirada Surf			15 + 34 acres 6.1 + 13.8 ha (Note: Divided by State Route 1 into the 15-acre Mirada Surf West and 34-acre East.)	El Granada	
12	Moss Beach		2014	467 acres 189 ha	Moss Beach	
13	Pescadero Creek		1968	8,020 acres 3,250 ha	Loma Mar	
14	Pillar Point		2011	220 acres 89 ha	Moss Beach	
15	Quarry			517 acres 209 ha	El Granada	
16	Sam McDonald		1970	850 acres 340 ha	Loma Mar	
17	San Bruno Mountain		1978	2,416 acres 978 ha	Brisbane	
18	San Pedro Valley		1970s	1,052 acres 426 ha	Pacifica	
19	Sanchez Adobe		1953	5 acres 2.0 ha	Pacifica	
20	Tunitas Creek Beach				Half Moon Bay	
21	Woodside Store		1940	—	Woodside	
22	Wunderlich		1974	942 acres 381 ha	Woodside	

Notes

Prior to the rebuilding of the San Mateo Bridge that began in 1996, the county had also operated Werder Pier for fishermen; it had been the western segment of the original 1929 vertical-lift bridge.

In addition to the county-operated parks, San Mateo County voters created the Midpeninsula Regional Open Space District in 1972, administered by the Peninsula Open Space Trust, which owns several protected spaces within San Mateo County (as well as within Santa Clara and Santa Cruz counties). San Mateo County protected spaces administered by POST include:

- Coal Creek Open Space Preserve
- El Corte de Madera Creek
- La Honda Creek Open Space Preserve
- Long Ridge Open Space Preserve (partially within Santa Clara County)
- Los Trancos Open Space Preserve (partially within Santa Clara County)
- Pulgas Ridge Open Space Preserve
- Purisima Creek Redwoods Open Space Preserve
- Ravenswood Open Space Preserve
- Russian Ridge Open Space Preserve
- Skyline Ridge Open Space Preserve
- Teague Hill Open Space Preserve
- Thornewood Open Space Preserve
- Windy Hill Open Space Preserve

=== State parks ===
- Año Nuevo State Park
- Butano State Park
- Castle Rock State Park
- Heritage Grove
- Portola Redwoods State Park
- Quarry Park
- Burleigh H. Murray Ranch
- Pigeon Point Light Station Historic State Park
- Point Montara Light Station State Park
- San Bruno Mountain State Park

=== State beaches ===
- Año Nuevo State Reserve
- Bean Hollow State Beach
- Big Basin State Beach
- Gray Whale Cove State Beach
- Half Moon Bay State Beach
- Montara State Beach
- Pacifica State Beach
- Pebble Beach
- Pescadero State Beach
- Pomponio State Beach
- San Gregorio State Beach
- Thornton State Beach

== Demographics ==
Historical population
Census	Pop.	Note	%±
1860	3,214		—
1870	6,635		106.4%
1880	8,669		30.7%
1890	10,087		16.4%
1900	12,094		19.9%
1910	26,585		119.8%
1920	36,781		38.4%
1930	77,405		110.4%
1940	111,782		44.4%
1950	235,659		110.8%
1960	444,387		88.6%
1970	556,234		25.2%
1980	587,329		5.6%
1990	649,623		10.6%
2000	707,161		8.9%
2010	718,451		1.6%
2020	764,442		6.4%
2025 (est.)	743,568	▼	−2.7%
U.S. Decennial Census; 1790–1960 1900–1990; 1990–2000 2010 2020

=== 2020 census ===
San Mateo County, California – Racial and ethnic composition Note: the US Census treats Hispanic/Latino as an ethnic category. This table excludes Latinos from the racial categories and assigns them to a separate category. Hispanics/Latinos may be of any race.
Race / ethnicity (NH = Non-Hispanic)	Pop 1980	Pop 1990	Pop 2000	Pop 2010	Pop 2020	% 1980	% 1990	% 2000	% 2010	% 2020
White alone (NH)	415,984	392,131	352,355	303,609	275,902	70.83%	60.36%	49.83%	42.26%	36.09%
Black or African American alone (NH)	34,730	34,000	23,778	18,763	14,701	5.91%	5.23%	3.36%	2.61%	1.92%
Native American or Alaska Native alone (NH)	2,481	2,349	1,546	1,125	1,021	0.42%	0.36%	0.22%	0.16%	0.13%
Asian alone (NH)	56,305	105,559	140,313	175,934	227,783	9.59%	16.25%	19.84%	24.49%	29.80%
Native Hawaiian or Pacific Islander alone (NH)	x	x	9,112	9,884	8,840	x	x	1.29%	1.38%	1.16%
Other race alone (NH)	4,490	957	2,217	2,709	5,840	0.76%	0.15%	0.31%	0.38%	0.76%
Mixed race or Multiracial (NH)	x	x	23,132	23,925	38,969	x	x	3.27%	3.33%	5.10%
Hispanic or Latino (any race)	73,339	114,627	154,708	182,502	191,386	12.49%	17.65%	21.88%	25.40%	25.04%
Total	587,329	649,623	707,161	718,451	764,442	100.00%	100.00%	100.00%	100.00%	100.00%

=== American Community Survey 2025 data ===
The United States Census Bureau estimated that in 2025, San Mateo County’s population was 743.568. It was also estimated that the county's population was 33,58% Non-Hispanic White, 25,19% Hispanic or Latino, 2,01% Non-Hispanic Black, 33,45% Asian, 0,14% Native American, 1,17% Pacific Islander, and 4,46% Multiracial.

Total	Population	Percentage
Non-Hispanic White	249.696	33,58%
Hispanic or Latino	187.277	25,19%
Non-Hispanic Black	14.918	2,01%
Asian	248.721	33,45%
Native American	1.073	0,14%
Pacific Islander	8.709	1,17%
Non-Hispanic Multiracial	33.174	4,46%

As of the 2020 census, the county had a population of 764,442 and a median age of 39.9 years. 20.2% of residents were under the age of 18 and 16.5% were 65 years of age or older; for every 100 females there were 97.6 males, and for every 100 females age 18 and over there were 95.6 males age 18 and over.

The racial makeup of the county was 39.3% White, 2.1% Black or African American, 0.9% American Indian and Alaska Native, 30.1% Asian, 1.2% Native Hawaiian and Pacific Islander, 14.1% from some other race, and 12.3% from two or more races. Hispanic or Latino residents of any race comprised 25.0% of the population.

98.3% of residents lived in urban areas, while 1.7% lived in rural areas.

There were 269,417 households in the county, of which 32.9% had children under the age of 18 living with them and 24.1% had a female householder with no spouse or partner present. About 22.1% of all households were made up of individuals and 9.5% had someone living alone who was 65 years of age or older.

There were 283,693 housing units, of which 5.0% were vacant. Among occupied housing units, 56.5% were owner-occupied and 43.5% were renter-occupied. The homeowner vacancy rate was 0.6% and the rental vacancy rate was 4.9%.

=== 2012 ===
As of 2012, San Mateo County had one of the largest Tongan communities outside of Tonga, with an estimated 13,000 Tongan Americans.

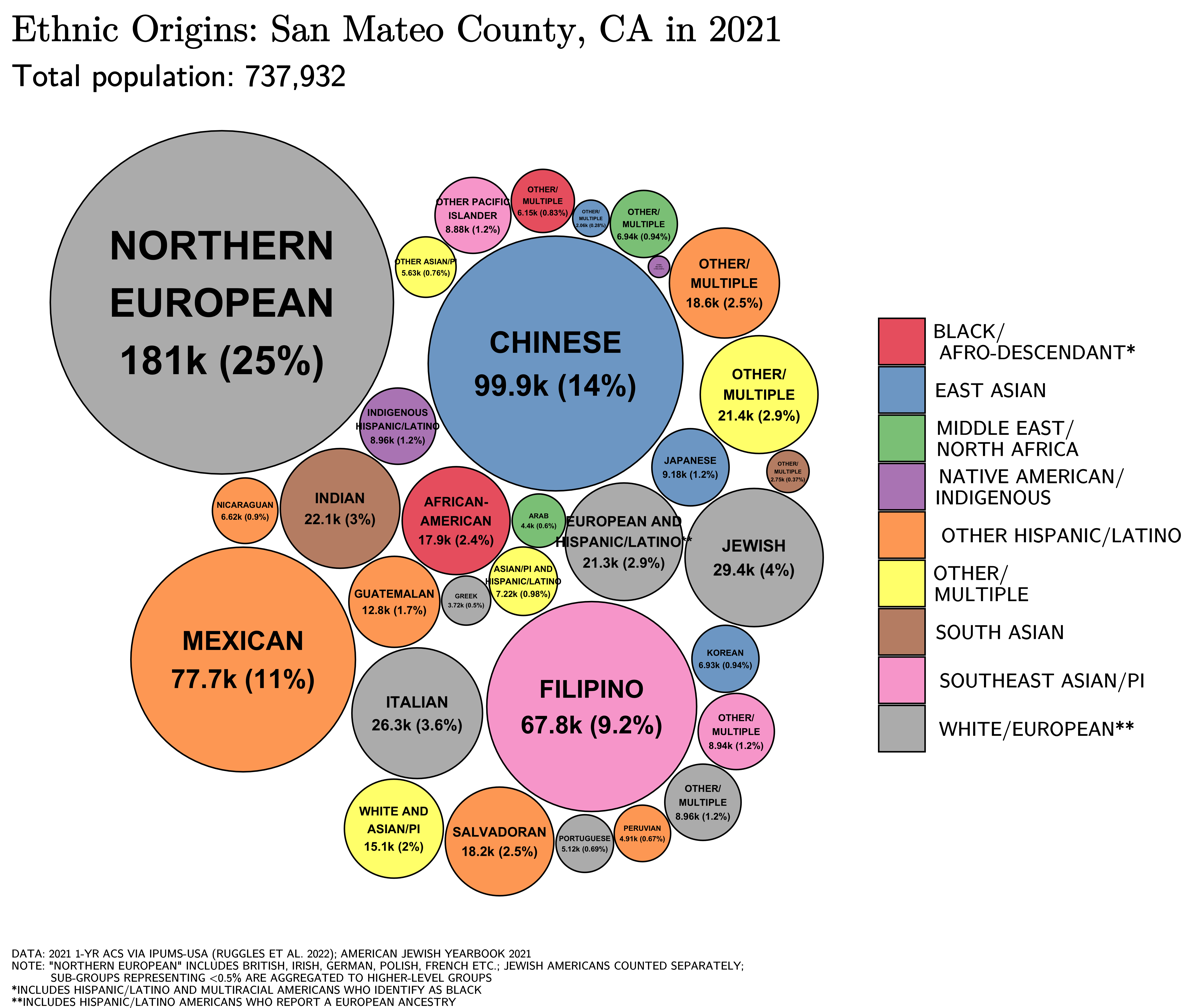
Ethnic origins in San Mateo County

=== 2010 ===
The 2010 United States census reported that San Mateo County had a population of 718,451. The racial makeup of San Mateo County was 383,535 (53.4%) White, 20,436 (2.8%) African American, 3,306 (0.5%) Native American, 178,118 (24.8%) Asian (9.8% Filipino, 9.0% Chinese, 1.9% Indian, 1.2% Japanese, 0.8% Korean, 0.5% Vietnamese, 0.3% Burmese, 0.1% Pakistani), 10,317 (1.4%) Pacific Islander (0.6% Tongan, 0.3% Samoan, 0.2% Fijian, 0.1% Native Hawaiian), 84,529 (11.8%) from other races, and 38,210 (5.3%) from two or more races. Hispanic or Latino of any race were 182,502 persons (25.4%); 15.7% of San Mateo County is Mexican, 2.7% Salvadoran, 1.2% Guatemalan, 1.2% Nicaraguan, 0.7% Peruvian, 0.6% Puerto Rican, 0.2% Colombian, and 0.2% Cuban.

Demographic profile	2010
Total Population	718,451 - 100.0%
One Race	680,241 - 94.7%
Not Hispanic or Latino	535,949 - 74.6%
White alone	303,609 - 42.3%
Black or African American alone	18,763 - 2.6%
American Indian and Alaska Native alone	1,125 - 0.2%
Asian alone	175,934 - 24.5%
Native Hawaiian and Other Pacific Islander alone	9,884 - 1.4%
Some other race alone	2,709 - 0.4%
Two or more races alone	23,925 - 3.3%
Hispanic or Latino (of any race)	182,502 - 25.4%

Population reported at 2010 United States census
The County	Total; Population	White	African; American	Native; American	Asian	Pacific; Islander	other races	two or more races	Hispanic or Latino (of any race)
San Mateo County	718,451	383,535	20,436	3,306	178,118	10,317	84,529	38,210	182,502
Incorporated cities and towns	Total; Population	White	African; American	Native; American	Asian	Pacific; Islander	other races	two or more races	Hispanic or Latino (of any race)
Atherton	6,914	5,565	75	7	911	45	95	216	268
Belmont	25,835	17,455	423	72	5,151	198	964	1,572	2,977
Brisbane	4,282	2,578	80	21	1,084	41	182	296	712
Burlingame	28,806	19,510	360	74	5,841	139	1,451	1,431	3,966
Colma	1,792	620	59	7	619	9	366	112	708
Daly City	101,123	23,842	3,600	404	56,267	805	11,236	4,969	23,929
East Palo Alto	28,155	8,104	4,704	120	1,057	2,118	10,694	1,358	18,147
Foster City	30,567	13,912	576	29	13,746	189	575	1,540	1,995
Half Moon Bay	11,324	8,580	82	71	490	9	1,710	382	3,563
Hillsborough	10,825	7,178	42	7	3,044	23	109	422	373
Menlo Park	32,026	22,494	1,551	156	3,157	454	2,776	1,438	5,902
Millbrae	21,532	10,177	179	33	9,205	214	776	948	2,555
Pacifica	37,234	24,166	976	206	7,230	315	1,703	2,638	6,243
Portola Valley	4,353	3,960	12	5	242	1	29	104	175
Redwood City	76,815	46,255	1,881	511	8,216	795	14,967	4,190	29,810
San Bruno	41,114	20,350	942	246	10,423	1,377	5,075	2,701	12,016
San Carlos	28,406	22,497	233	65	3,267	70	827	1,447	2,855
San Mateo	97,207	56,214	2,296	505	18,384	1,998	12,264	5,546	25,815
South San Francisco	63,632	23,760	1,625	395	23,293	1,111	9,598	3,850	21,645
Woodside	5,287	4,717	23	4	332	4	63	144	243
Census-designated places	Total; Population	White	African; American	Native; American	Asian	Pacific; Islander	other races	two or more races	Hispanic or Latino (of any race)
Broadmoor	4,176	1,705	100	30	1,676	44	359	262	981
El Granada	5,467	4,608	45	38	190	5	336	245	813
Emerald Lake Hills	4,278	3,655	39	5	322	15	56	186	288
Highlands-Baywood Park	4,027	2,657	53	9	1,017	17	47	227	306
Ladera	928	811	13	0	16	2	18	68	69
La Honda	1,426	1,269	3	1	98	0	5	50	33
Loma Mar	113	101	2	0	3	0	0	7	12
Montara	2,909	2,491	16	21	142	1	97	141	324
Moss Beach	3,103	2,280	25	43	118	9	494	134	903
North Fair Oaks	14,687	7,060	235	143	548	219	5,728	754	10,731
Pescadero	643	314	2	2	5	1	294	25	402
West Menlo Park	3,659	2,983	28	2	416	4	52	174	201
Other unincorporated areas	Total; Population	White	African; American	Native; American	Asian	Pacific; Islander	other races	two or more races	Hispanic or Latino (of any race)
All others not CDPs (combined)	15,806	11,667	156	74	1,608	85	1,583	633	3,542

=== 2000 ===
Age distribution (2000 census)

As of the census of 2009, there were 714,936 people, 258,648 households, and 174,582 families residing in the county. The population density was 2,753 people per square mile (1,063 people/km^{2}). There were 284,471 housing units at an average density of 789 units per square mile (305 units/km^{2}). 7.4% were of Italian, 7.1% Irish, 7.0% German and 5.3% English ancestry according to Census 2000. 46.9% spoke English, 28.4% Spanish, 6.2% Tagalog, 4.0% Chinese or Mandarin and 1.1% Cantonese, and other language 4.2%, as their first language from estimate census 2009.

There were 258,648 households, out of which 30% had children under the age of 18, 48.6% were married couples living together, 14.7% had a female householder with no husband present, and 41.7% were non-families. 31.5% of all households were made up of individuals, and 6.2% had someone living alone who was 65 years of age or older. The average household size was 3.79 and the average family size was 4.44.

In the county, the population was spread out, with 28.6% under the age of 18, 15.9% from 18 to 24, 25.8% from 25 to 44, 21% from 45 to 64, and 9.7% who were 65 years of age or older. The median age was 31 years. For every 100 females there were 97.8 males. For every 100 females age 18 and over, there were 95.1 males.

The median income for a household in the county was $69,306, and the median income for a family was $77,737. Males had a median income of $48,342 versus $45,383 for females. The per capita income for the county was $36,045. About 6.42% of families and 9.51% of the population were below the poverty line, including 10.01% of those under age 18 and 8.52% of those age 65 or over.

== Government ==
San Mateo County has a five-member Board of Supervisors, representing five geographic districts. The Board of Supervisors were formerly elected at-large (by voters across the entire county) until November 2012. On November 6, 2012, Measure B passed to amend the San Mateo County Charter so that each member of the Board of Supervisors would be elected by voters in their district.

- District 1 is represented by Jackie Speier.
- District 2 is represented by Noelia Corzo.
- District 3 is represented by Ray Mueller.
- District 4 is represented by Lisa Gauthier.
- District 5 is represented by David Canepa.

The other county elected officials are:

Elected Office	Name
Assessor–County Clerk–Recorder	Mark Church
Controller	Juan Raizoga
Coroner	Robert Foucrault
District Attorney	Stephen M. Wagstaffe
Sheriff	Kenneth Binder
Treasurer–Tax Collector	Sandie Arnott

San Mateo County is split between California's 15th and 16th congressional districts, represented by Kevin Mullin (D–South San Francisco) and Sam Liccardo (D–San Jose), respectively.

In the California State Assembly, San Mateo County is split between three legislative districts:

- the 19th Assembly district, represented by Democrat Catherine Stefani,
- the 21st Assembly district, represented by Democrat Diane Papan, and
- the 23rd Assembly district, represented by Democrat Marc Berman.

In the California State Senate, San Mateo is split between the 11th and 13th districts, represented by Scott Wiener and Josh Becker, respectively.

== Politics ==
=== Presidential election results and voter registration ===
United States presidential election results for San Mateo County, California (Note: This total comprised 2,825 votes for Progressive Theodore Roosevelt (who was official Republican nominee in California), 827 votes for Socialist Eugene V. Debs and 80 votes for Prohibition Party nominee Eugene W. Chafin.)
Year	Republican		Democratic		Third party(ies)	
Year	No.	%	No.	%	No.	%
1880	760	51.01%	720	48.32%	10	0.67%
1884	950	55.33%	750	43.68%	17	0.99%
1888	1,121	52.95%	980	46.29%	16	0.76%
1892	1,088	50.56%	1,020	47.40%	44	2.04%
1896	1,607	61.10%	987	37.53%	36	1.37%
1900	1,645	63.00%	914	35.01%	52	1.99%
1904	2,146	68.45%	851	27.15%	138	4.40%
1908	2,865	62.91%	1,314	28.85%	375	8.23%
1912	7	0.10%	3,246	46.47%	3,732	53.43%
1916	5,207	50.01%	4,485	43.08%	719	6.91%
1920	7,205	70.52%	1,958	19.16%	1,054	10.32%
1924	8,126	55.27%	771	5.24%	5,805	39.48%
1928	14,360	58.87%	9,755	39.99%	277	1.14%
1932	13,442	39.68%	19,094	56.36%	1,343	3.96%
1936	13,650	33.09%	27,087	65.67%	511	1.24%
1940	26,539	46.60%	29,831	52.38%	581	1.02%
1944	33,590	49.15%	34,594	50.62%	158	0.23%
1948	48,909	56.69%	34,215	39.66%	3,148	3.65%
1952	92,279	63.61%	52,149	35.95%	651	0.45%
1956	100,049	61.04%	63,637	38.83%	217	0.13%
1960	104,570	51.70%	97,154	48.04%	528	0.26%
1964	77,916	35.55%	140,978	64.32%	297	0.14%
1968	98,654	43.72%	106,519	47.20%	20,495	9.08%
1972	135,377	52.82%	109,745	42.82%	11,175	4.36%
1976	117,338	50.63%	102,896	44.40%	11,507	4.97%
1980	116,491	48.82%	87,335	36.60%	34,811	14.59%
1984	135,185	51.87%	122,268	46.91%	3,178	1.22%
1988	109,261	42.94%	141,859	55.74%	3,360	1.32%
1992	75,080	27.15%	149,232	53.97%	52,196	18.88%
1996	73,508	29.22%	152,304	60.55%	25,720	10.23%
2000	80,296	30.95%	166,757	64.29%	12,346	4.76%
2004	83,315	29.25%	197,922	69.48%	3,620	1.27%
2008	75,057	24.75%	222,826	73.47%	5,409	1.78%
2012	72,756	25.46%	206,085	72.13%	6,879	2.41%
2016	57,929	18.43%	237,882	75.67%	18,573	5.91%
2020	75,584	20.20%	291,496	77.89%	7,171	1.92%
2024	76,616	23.18%	242,957	73.50%	10,992	3.33%

Population and registered voters
Total population	711,622	
Registered voters (Note: Percentage of registered voters with respect to total population. Percentages of party members with respect to registered voters follow.)	360,786	50.7%
Democratic	185,134	51.3%
Republican	69,925	19.4%
Democratic–Republican spread	+115,209	+31.9%
American Independent	7,693	2.1%
Green	2,521	0.7%
Libertarian	1,852	0.5%
Peace and Freedom	735	0.2%
Americans Elect	14	0.0%
Other	754	0.2%
No party preference	92,158	25.5%

==== Cities by population and voter registration ====
Cities by population and voter registration
City	Population	Registered voters	Democratic	Republican	D–R spread	Other	No party preference
Atherton	7,137	69.4%	34.7%	31.1%	+3.6%	3.9%	30.3%
Belmont	26,941	58.7%	48.5%	16.0%	+32.5%	3.9%	31.6%
Brisbane	4,671	59.8%	52.1%	10.4%	+41.7%	5.1%	32.4%
Burlingame	30,889	57.5%	47.5%	17.2%	+30.3%	4.0%	31.3%
Colma	1,489	47.1%	55.5%	11.0%	+44.5%	3.7%	29.8%
Daly City	106,280	43.9%	51.8%	9.6%	+42.2%	3.3%	35.3%
East Palo Alto	29,314	35.9%	57.4%	6.1%	+51.3%	4.4%	32.1%
Foster City	33,901	48.9%	44.3%	16.6%	+27.7%	2.9%	36.2%
Half Moon Bay	12,932	58.4%	47.7%	18.3%	+29.4%	5.6%	28.4%
Hillsborough	11,387	68.5%	33.8%	30.0%	+3.8%	3.9%	32.3%
Menlo Park	34,698	55.7%	51.6%	15.5%	+36.1%	3.5%	29.4%
Millbrae	22,394	57.4%	44.6%	15.9%	+28.7%	3.8%	35.7%
Pacifica	38,546	64.9%	53.6%	13.1%	+40.5%	4.7%	28.6%
Portola Valley	4,568	74.7%	46.3%	22.4%	+23.9%	3.8%	27.5%
Redwood City	85,925	48.7%	50.7%	14.9%	+35.8%	5.9%	30.5%
San Bruno	42,807	53.3%	52.0%	13.4%	+38.6%	3.9%	30.7%
San Carlos	30,185	65.3%	48.7%	18.6%	+30.1%	3.8%	28.9%
San Mateo	104,430	52.6%	50.1%	15.5%	+34.6%	3.9%	30.5%
South San Francisco	67,789	48.6%	53.5%	10.9%	+42.6%	3.5%	32.1%
Woodside	5,458	75.2%	40.4%	26.6%	+13.8%	4.5%	28.5%

=== Overview ===
The California Secretary of State, as of February 2019, reports that San Mateo County has 404,958 registered voters. Of those voters, 202,341 (50%) are registered Democratic, 60,045 (14.3%) are registered Republican, 15,834 (3.9%) are registered with other political parties, and 126,738 (31.3%) declined to state a political party preference. Every city, town, and unincorporated area of San Mateo County has more registered Democrats than Republicans.

On November 4, 2008, San Mateo County voted 61.8% against Proposition 8, which amended the California Constitution to ban same-sex marriages.

== Crime ==
The following table includes the number of incidents reported and the rate per 1,000 persons for each type of offense.

Population and crime rates
Population	711,622	
Violent crime	2,072	2.91
Homicide	16	0.02
Forcible rape	128	0.18
Robbery	734	1.03
Aggravated assault	1,194	1.68
Property crime	8,677	12.19
Burglary	3,072	4.32
Larceny-theft	10,712	15.05
Motor vehicle theft	1,988	2.79
Arson	125	0.18

=== Cities by population and crime rates ===
City	Population	Violent crimes	Violent crime rate per 1,000 persons	Property crimes	Property crime rate per 1,000 persons
Atherton	7,060	6	0.85	124	17.56
Belmont	26,389	24	0.91	408	15.46
Brisbane	4,374	6	1.37	142	32.46
Broadmoor	4,264	13	3.05	62	14.54
Burlingame	29,427	61	2.07	707	24.03
Colma	1,832	7	3.82	287	156.66
Daly City	103,311	216	2.09	1,803	17.45
East Palo Alto	28,766	333	11.58	587	20.41
Foster City	31,230	18	0.58	345	11.05
Hillsborough	11,060	1	0.09	86	7.78
Menlo Park	32,713	53	1.62	625	19.11
Pacifica	38,041	42	1.10	578	15.19
Redwood City	78,466	208	2.65	1,800	22.94
San Bruno	42,002	85	2.02	961	22.88
San Mateo	99,303	261	2.63	1,876	18.89
South San Francisco	65,006	111	1.71	1,321	20.32
Overall	603,244	1,445	2.40	11,712	19.42

== Economy ==
A July 2013 Wall Street Journal article identified the Facebook initial public offering (IPO) as the cause of a change in the U.S.' national economic statistics, as San Mateo County—the home of the company—became the top wage-earning county in the country after the fourth quarter of 2012. The article revealed that the Bureau of Labor Statistics reported that the average weekly wage in the county was $3,240, which is 107% higher than the previous year: "That's the equivalent of $168,000 a year, and more than 50% higher than the next highest county, New York County (better known as Manhattan), which came in at $2,107 a week, or roughly $110,000 a year."

As of the fourth quarter of 2021, the median value of homes in San Mateo County was $1,247,070, an increase of 11% from the prior year. It ranked fourth in the U.S. for counties with highest median home value, behind Nantucket, Manhattan, and Santa Clara.

Additionally, San Mateo County hosts the headquarters of Visa Inc, Sony Interactive Entertainment, Electronic Arts, YouTube, Genentech, GoPro, and Gilead Sciences, as well as a hub of venture capital firms in Menlo Park and several other technology-related companies.

In 2016, Peninsula Clean Energy began providing electricity to 20 percent of residential customers, all municipalities, and all small- to mid-size businesses in the county, as a Community Choice Aggregation program, an alternative to Pacific Gas and Electric.

== Education ==
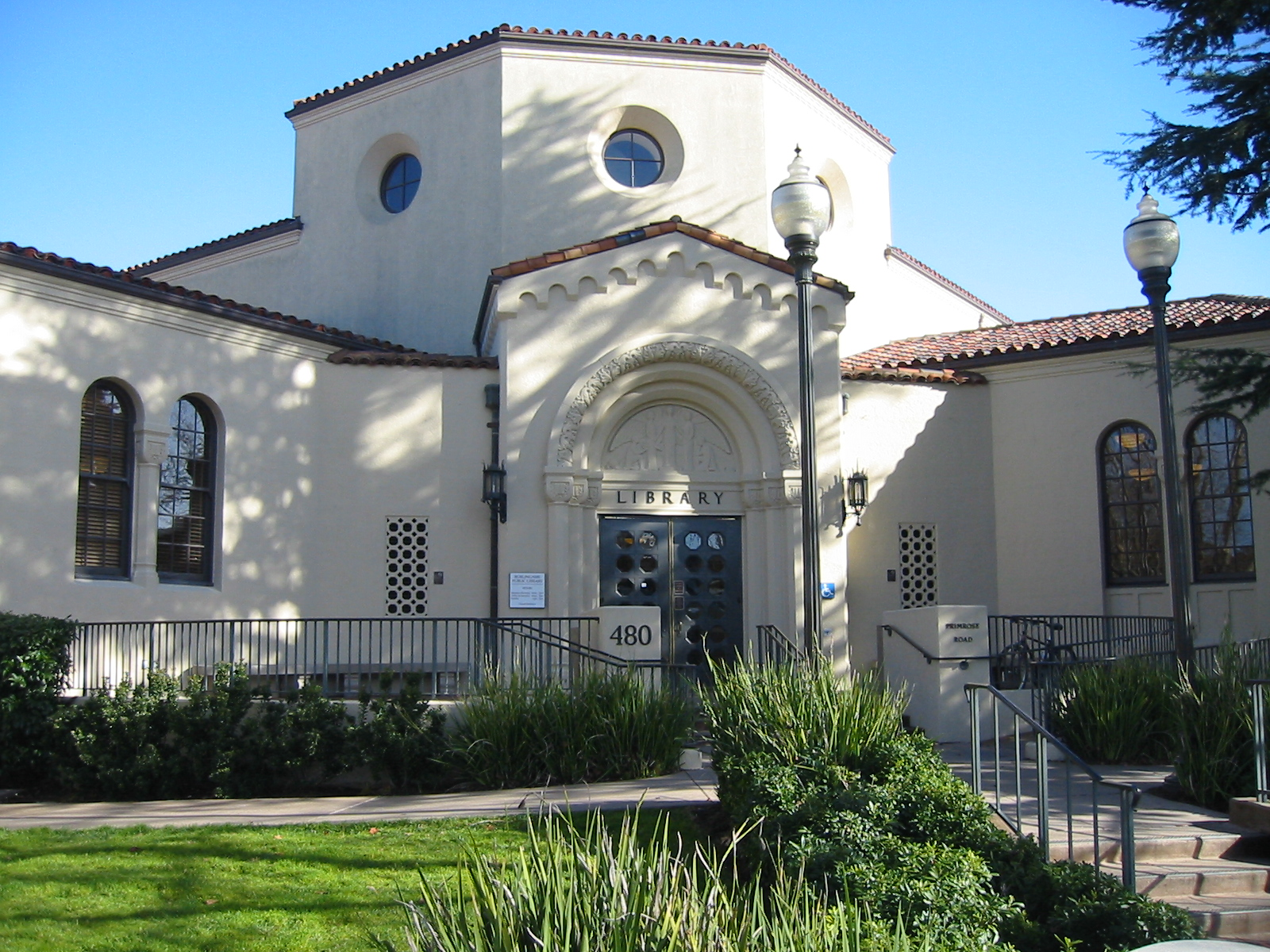
Burlingame Public Library

The people of San Mateo County may use the services of San Mateo County Libraries along with the Peninsula Library System and its dozens of branches, bookmobile and Library-a-Go-Go machine at the Millbrae BART/Caltrain station.

The county is divided into several public school districts and is also served by the local Catholic diocese and many other private parochial and secular schools. The San Mateo County Board of Education oversees early education, special education, and the court and community schools program in the county, as well as serves as an appeal board for the adjudication of expulsion appeals, interdistrict attendance appeals, and charter schools.

Some students in San Mateo County's public schools attend outdoor education in La Honda. San Mateo Outdoor Education is a residential school that teaches major concepts of ecology via exploration of forest, pond, garden, tidepool, wetland, and sandy shore habitats. The center's mascot is the banana slug, a large yellow gastropod. The school uses songs from the famous Banana Slug String Band.

=== K–12 school districts ===
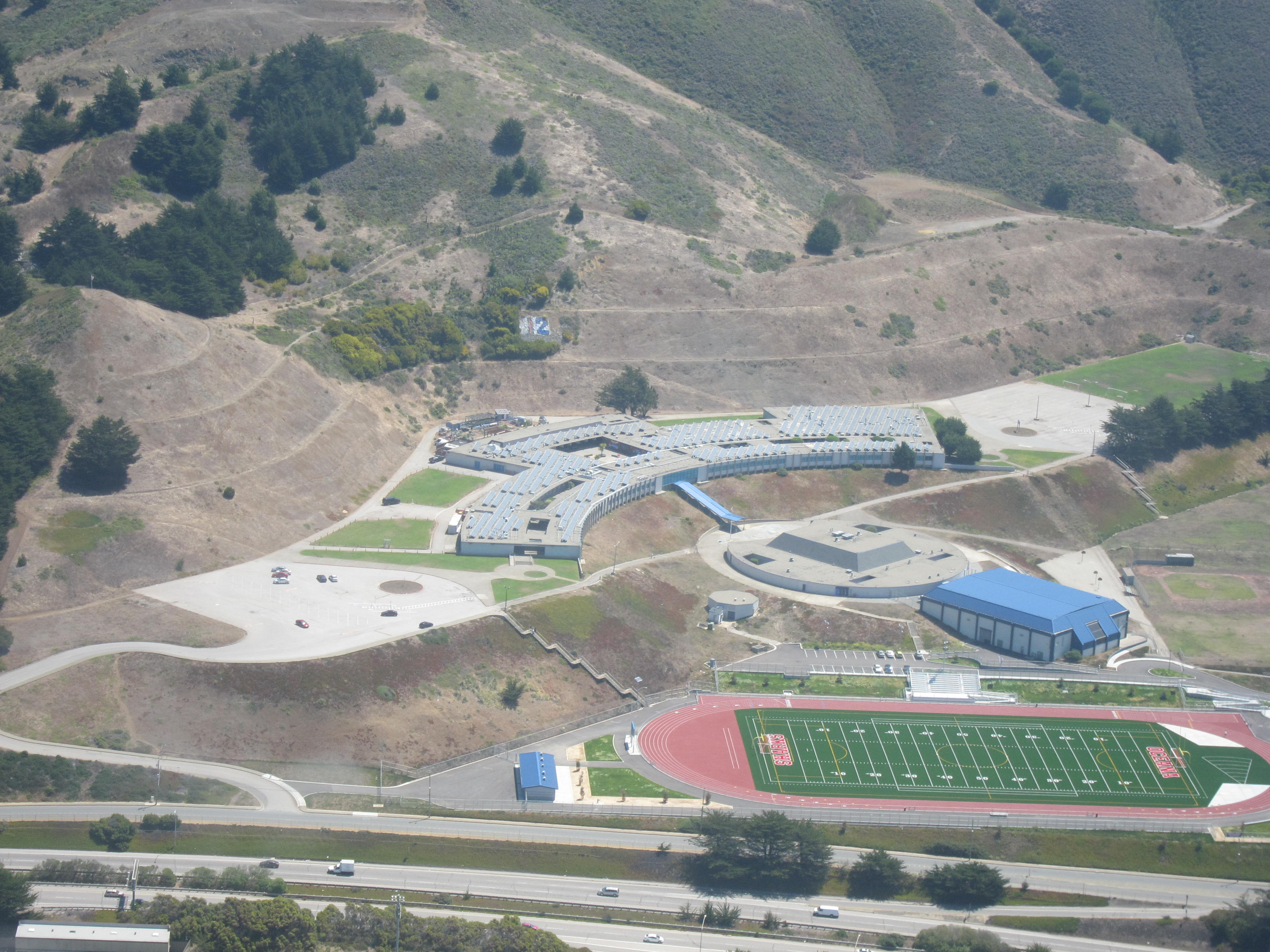
Oceana High School in Pacifica, part of the Jefferson Union High School District

They include:

Unified

- Cabrillo Unified School District
- La Honda–Pescadero Unified School District
- South San Francisco Unified School District

Secondary

- Jefferson Union High School District
- San Mateo Union High School District
- Sequoia Union High School District

Elementary

- Bayshore Elementary School District
- Belmont-Redwood Shores Elementary School District
- Brisbane Elementary School District
- Burlingame Elementary School District
- Hillsborough City Elementary School District
- Jefferson Elementary School District
- Las Lomitas Elementary School District
- Menlo Park City Elementary School District
- Millbrae Elementary School District
- Pacifica School District
- Portola Valley Elementary School District
- Ravenswood City Elementary School District
- Redwood City Elementary School District
- San Bruno Park Elementary School District
- San Carlos Elementary School District
- San Mateo-Foster City Elementary School District
- Woodside Elementary School District

=== Private schools ===
Offering secondary (6–12) education:

- Crystal Springs Uplands School (K–12)
- Junípero Serra High School (9–12, M)
- Menlo School (6–12)
- Mercy High School (9–12, F)
- Notre Dame High School (9–12, F)
- The Nueva School (K–12)
- Pacific Bay Christian School (K–12)
- Sacred Heart (K–12)
- Silicon Valley International (K–12)
- Stanbridge Academy (K–12)
- Woodside Priory School (6–12)

=== Higher education ===
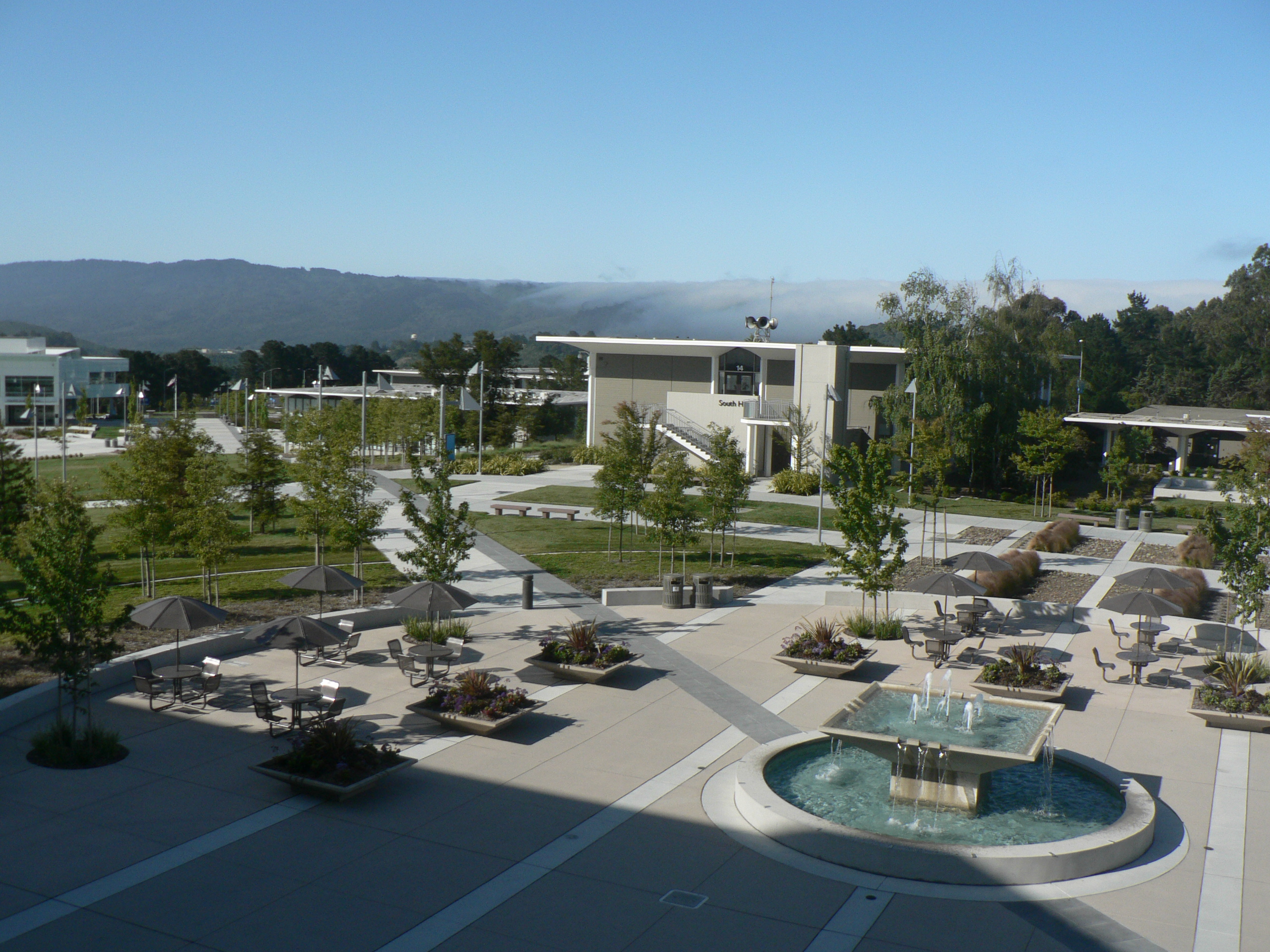
Campus of College of San Mateo

There are three community colleges in San Mateo County, all of which belong to the San Mateo County Community College District:

- Cañada College (Redwood City)
- College of San Mateo (San Mateo)
- Skyline College (San Bruno)

== Transportation ==
=== Major highways ===
- Interstate 280
- Interstate 380
- U.S. Route 101 (Bayshore Freeway)
- State Route 1
- State Route 9
- State Route 35 (Skyline Boulevard)
- State Route 82 (El Camino Real)
- State Route 84 (Woodside Road/Bayfront Expressway/Dumbarton Bridge)
- State Route 92 (San Mateo Bridge)
- State Route 109
- State Route 114 (Willow Road)

=== Public transportation ===
==== Rail ====
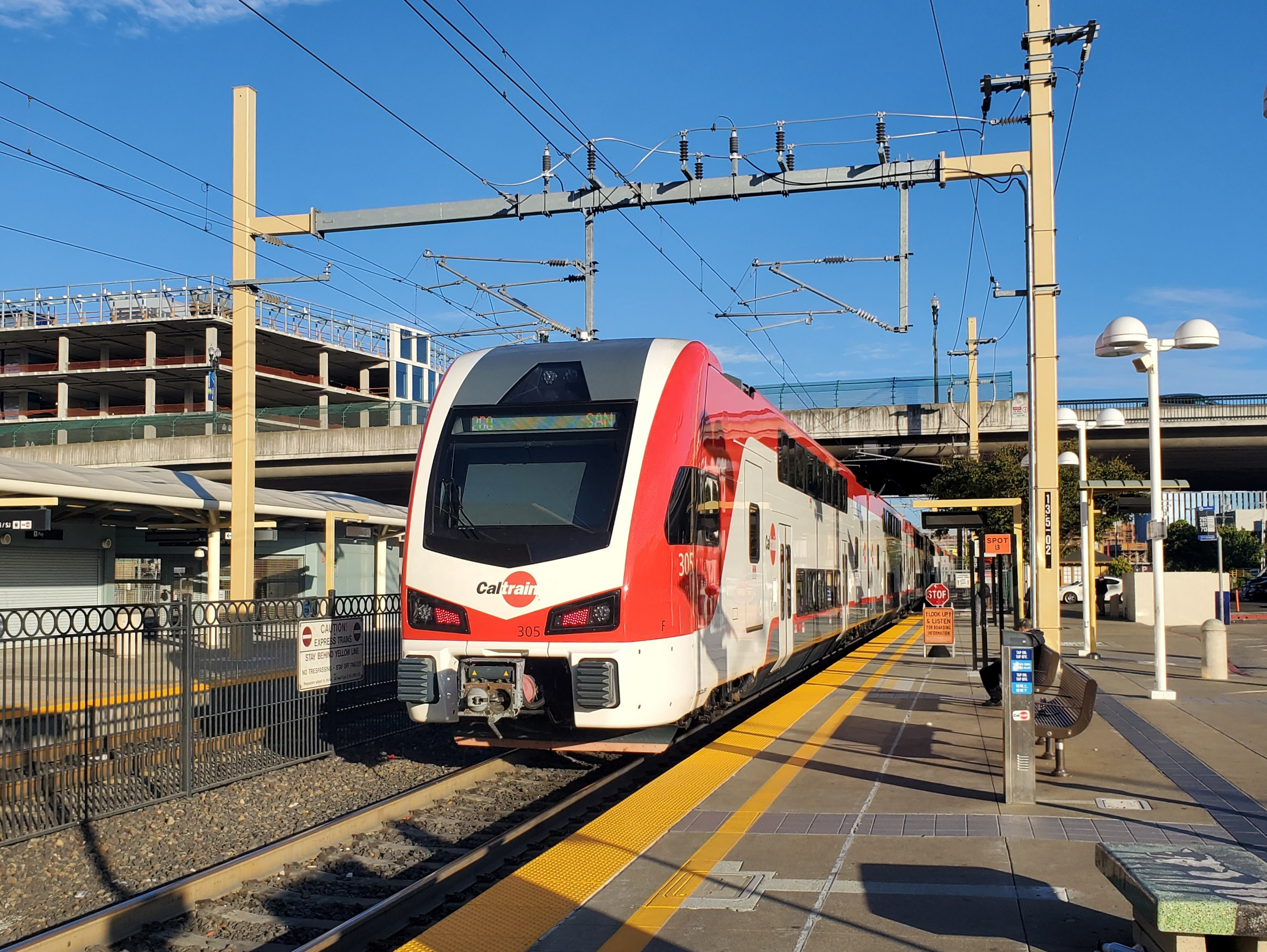
Caltrain in Millbrae

Caltrain, the commuter rail system, connects ten cities in the county with San Francisco (to the north) and San Jose / Gilroy (to the south), running between the Highway 101 and El Camino Real corridors for most of the way. There are 13 stations in San Mateo County, of which 12 have daily service; the ten cities with stations stretch from Brisbane on the north to Menlo Park on the south.

Caltrain stations in San Mateo County, from north to south

- Bayshore
- South San Francisco
- San Bruno
- Millbrae
- Broadway (weekends only)
- Burlingame
- San Mateo
- Hayward Park
- Hillsdale
- Belmont
- San Carlos
- Redwood City
- Menlo Park

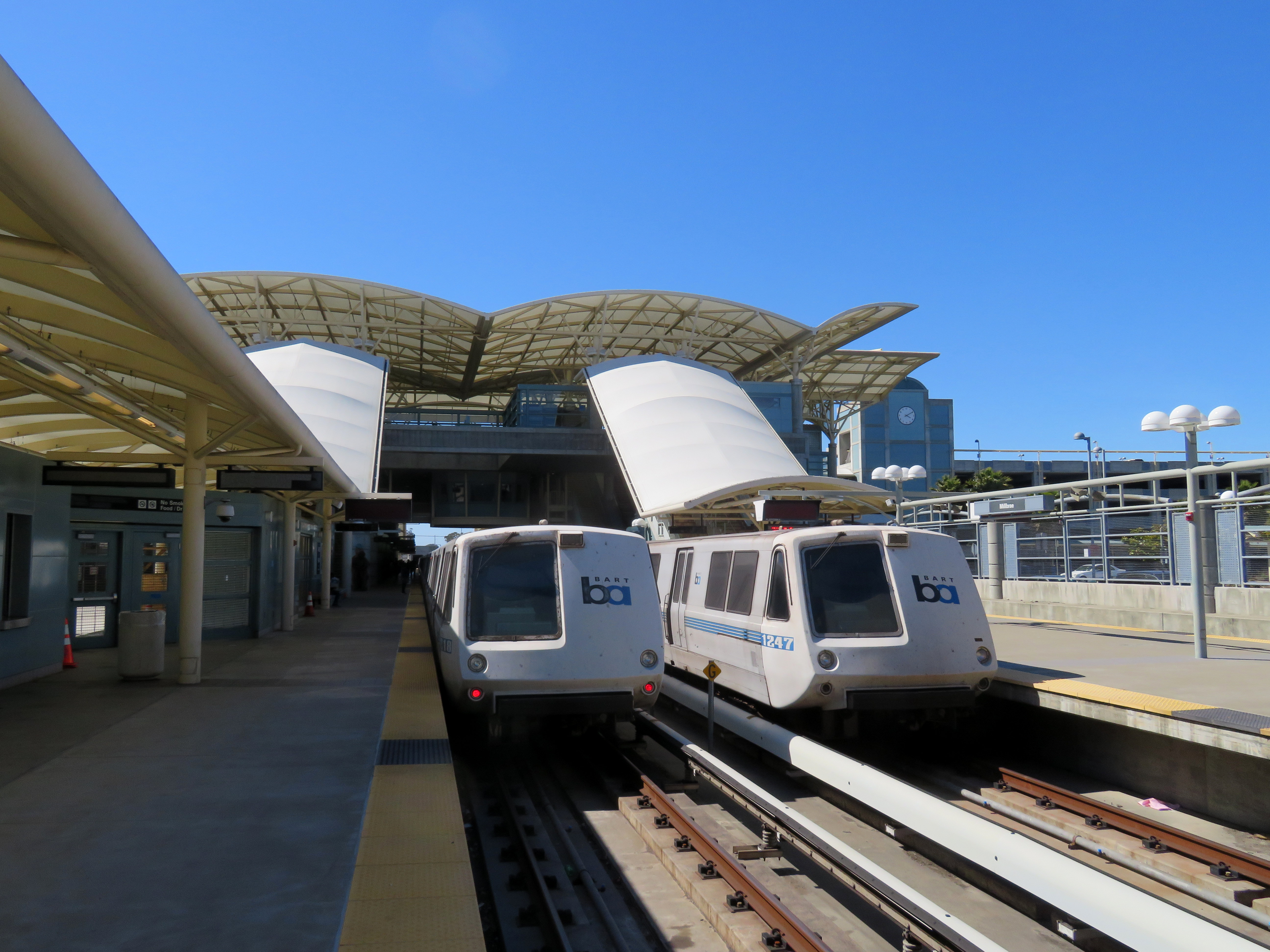
BART at Millbrae station

Bay Area Rapid Transit (BART) trains serve San Francisco International Airport (SFO) and the northern portion of the county, paralleling El Camino Real / Mission Boulevard at six stations between Daly City and Millbrae, including the station at SFO.

BART stations in San Mateo County, from north to south

- Daly City
- Colma
- South San Francisco
- San Bruno
- San Francisco International Airport
- Millbrae

The only direct connection between Caltrain and BART is at Millbrae station.

==== Bus ====
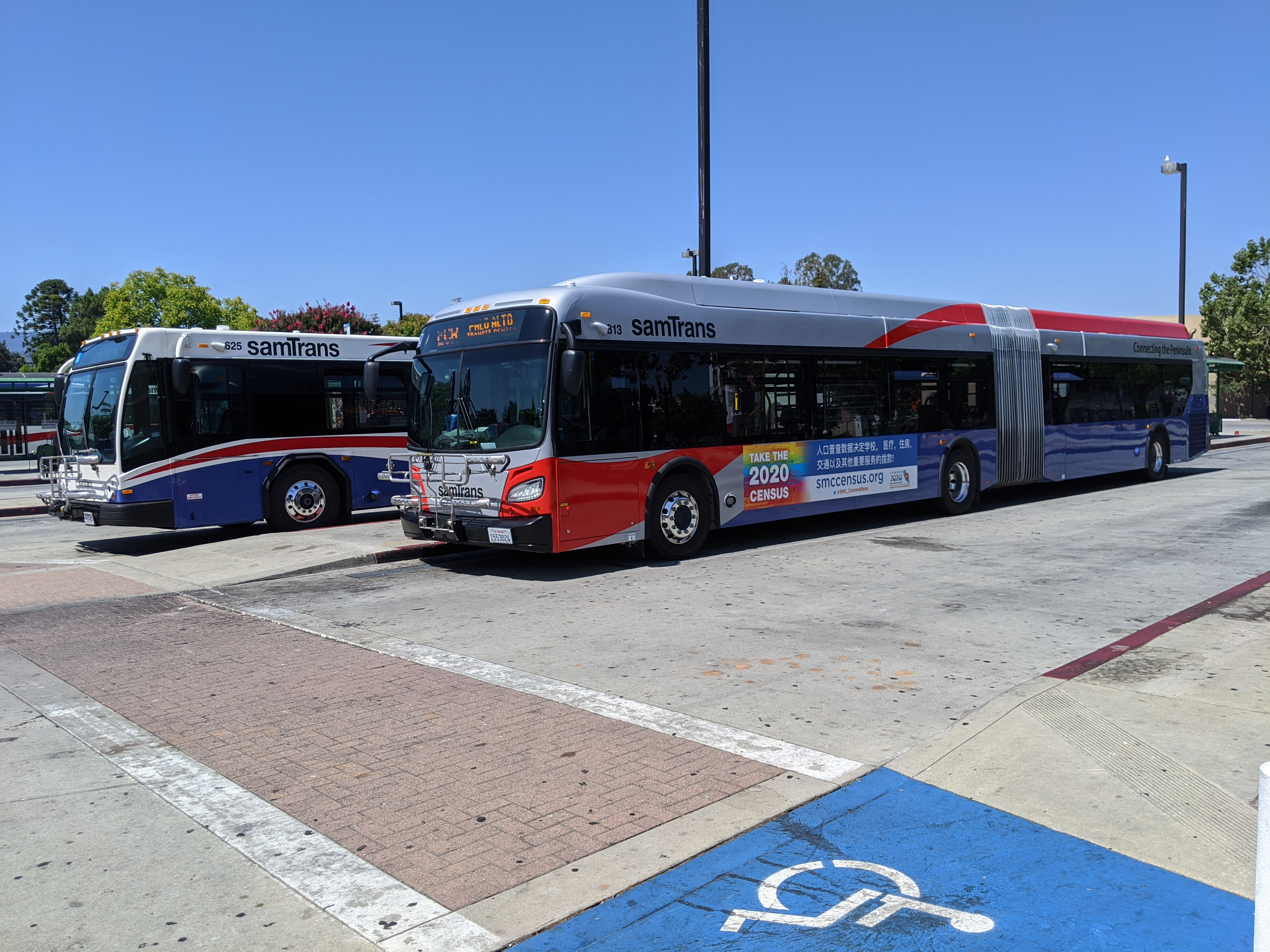
SamTrans buses in Redwood City

SamTrans (San Mateo County Transit District) provides local bus service within San Mateo County with some routes connecting to the Palo Alto Transit Center in Santa Clara County and Salesforce Transit Center in San Francisco. Approximately 2/3 of all SamTrans bus routes travel along El Camino Real, and route ECR, the primary bus route on El Camino, carries approximately 25% of SamTrans ridership.

Each Caltrain and BART station has connections to SamTrans routes. In addition, Daly City station is served by SF Muni bus routes. There are many free shuttles that operate from Caltrain, BART, and Ferry stations along fixed routes to local employers during weekday commuting hours (6–10 am and 3–7 pm).

Overnight rail service is substituted by All Nighter bus service, split between SamTrans routes 397 (replacing Caltrain between San Francisco and Palo Alto via SFO) and ECR Owl (replacing BART between Daly City and SFO).

=== Airports ===
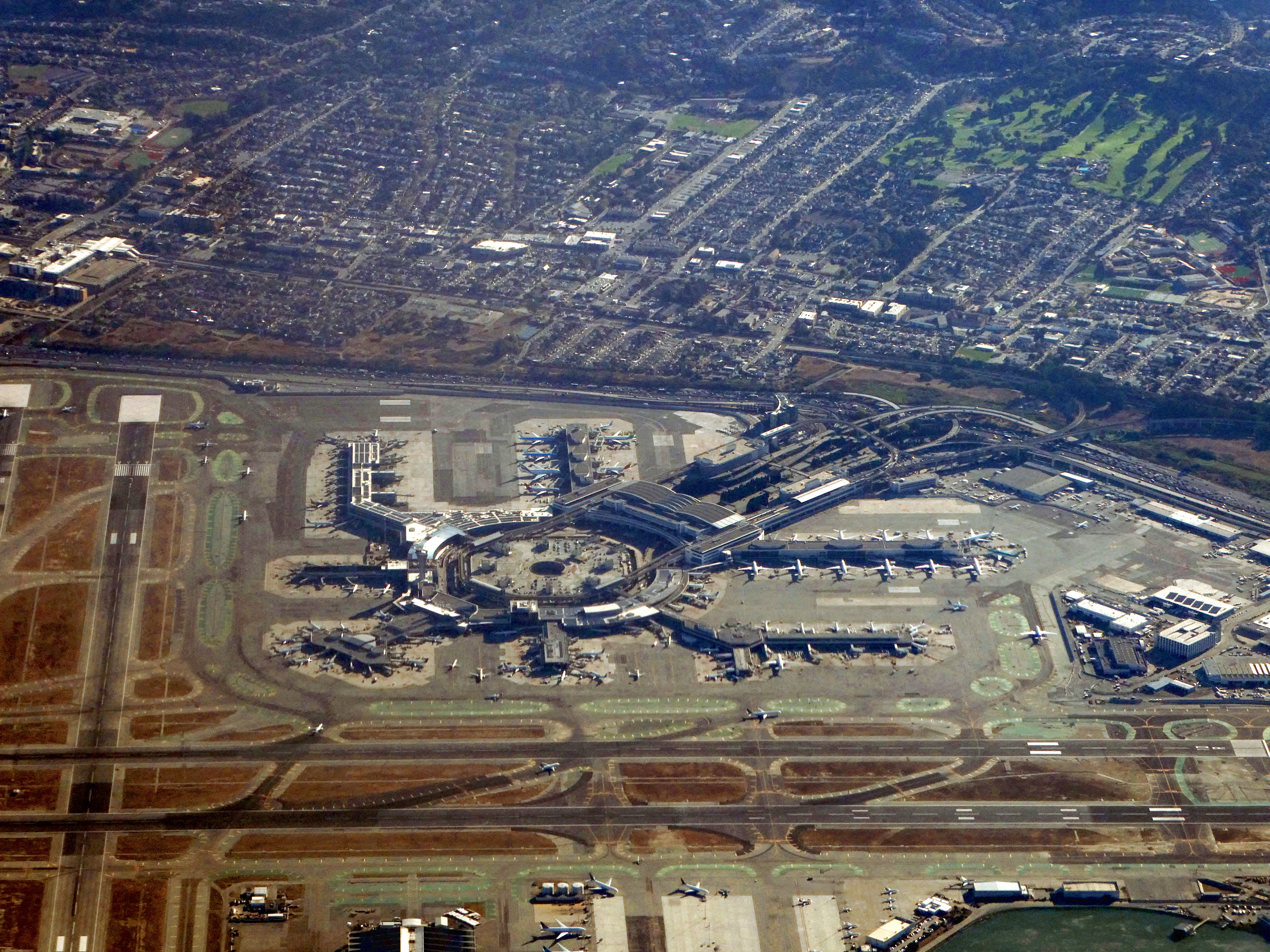
SFO, aerial view looking southwest

San Francisco International Airport is geographically located in San Mateo County, east of Highway 101 near San Bruno and Millbrae, but it is owned and operated by the City and County of San Francisco.

San Mateo County owns two general aviation airports: Half Moon Bay Airport and San Carlos Airport.

=== Marine transport ===
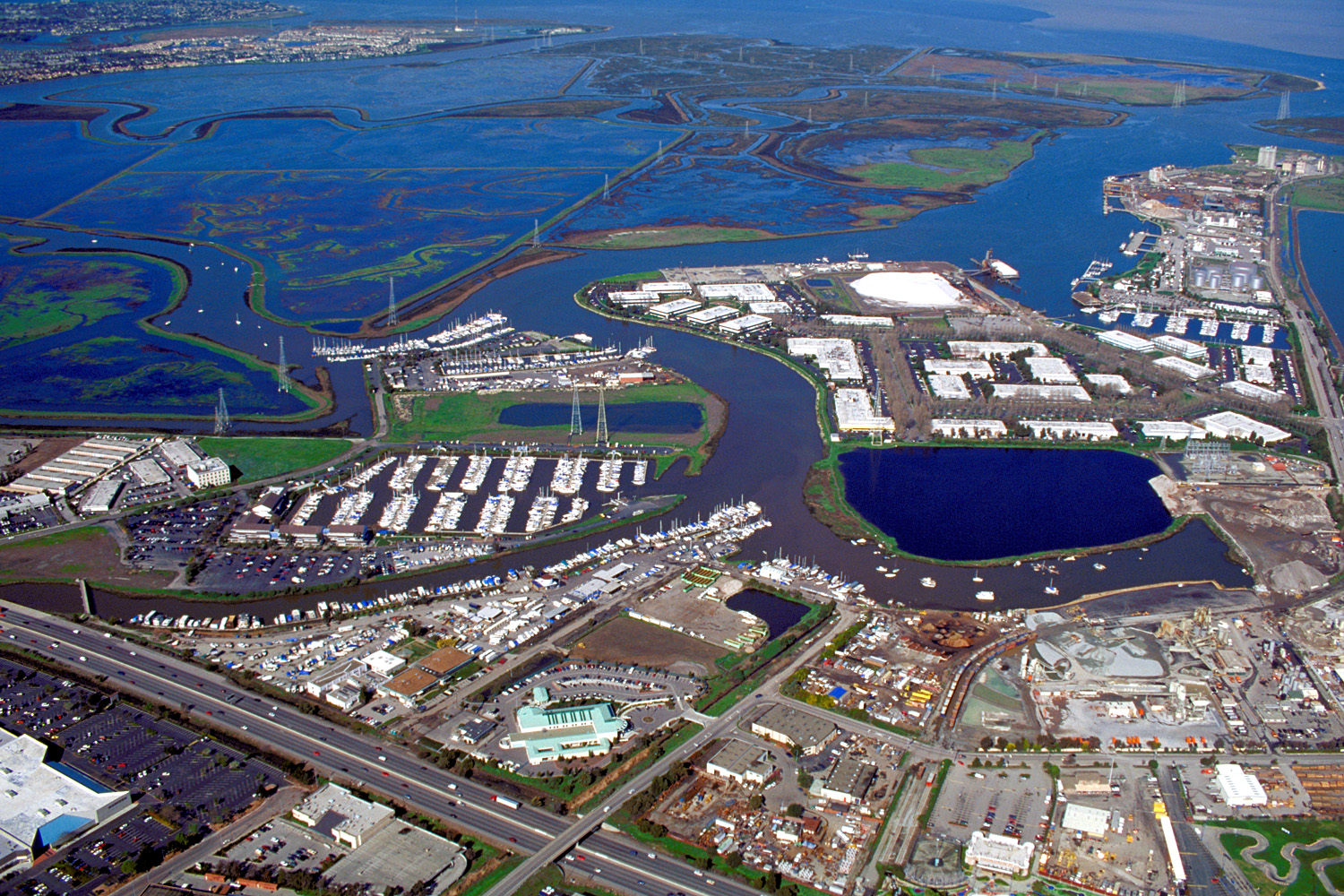
Port of Redwood City

The only deepwater port in South San Francisco Bay is the Port of Redwood City, situated along Redwood Creek, originally created as a lumber embarcadero in 1850. The San Mateo Harbor Harbor District manages the Pillar Point Harbor (on the Pacific coast side) and Oyster Point Marina (on San Francisco Bay).

The San Francisco Bay Ferry operates routes connecting the South San Francisco Ferry Terminal in Oyster Point to the Oakland Ferry Terminal in Jack London Square (Oakland) and the Alameda Ferry Terminal in Alameda. A free shuttle is provided to connect ferry passengers to the South San Francisco Caltrain station, via several business parks on Oyster Point.

== Notable structures ==
There are a number of well-known structures within San Mateo County:

- Carolands Mansion, Hillsborough
- Cow Palace, Daly City
- Uplands Mansion, Hillsborough
- Crystal Springs Reservoir, unincorporated central part of county
- CuriOdyssey, San Mateo
- Filoli Mansion, Woodside
- The Flintstone House, Hillsborough
- Notre Dame de Namur University, Belmont, which incorporates Ralston Hall
- Pigeon Point Lighthouse, Pescadero
- Point Montara Lighthouse, Montara
- Pulgas Water Temple, Woodside
- Sanchez Adobe, Pacifica
- San Mateo County History Museum, Redwood City
- San Francisco International Airport
- Stanford Linear Accelerator Center, Menlo Park

== Communities ==
=== Cities ===
- Belmont
- Brisbane
- Burlingame
- Daly City
- East Palo Alto
- Foster City
- Half Moon Bay
- Menlo Park
- Millbrae
- Pacifica
- Redwood City (county seat)
- San Bruno
- San Carlos
- San Mateo
- South San Francisco

=== Towns ===
- Atherton
- Colma
- Hillsborough
- Portola Valley
- Woodside

=== Census-designated places ===
- Baywood Park
- Broadmoor
- El Granada
- Emerald Lake Hills
- Highlands
- Ladera
- La Honda
- Loma Mar
- Montara
- Moss Beach
- North Fair Oaks
- Pescadero
- West Menlo Park

=== Unincorporated communities ===
- Burlingame Hills
- Devonshire
- Kings Mountain
- Los Trancos Woods
- Menlo Oaks
- Palomar Park
- Princeton-by-the-Sea
- San Gregorio
- Sky Londa

=== Population ranking ===
The population ranking of the following table is based on the 2020 United States census of San Mateo County.

† county seat

Rank	Location	Municipal type	Population (2020 Census)
1	San Mateo	Charter city	105,661
2	Daly City	General-law city	104,901
3	† Redwood City	Charter city	84,292
4	South San Francisco	General-law city	66,105
5	San Bruno	General-law city	43,908
6	Pacifica	General-law city	38,640
7	Foster City	General-law city	33,805
8	Menlo Park	General-law city	33,780
9	Burlingame	General-law city	31,386
10	San Carlos	General-law city	30,722
11	East Palo Alto	General-law city	30,034
12	Belmont	General-law city	28,335
13	Millbrae	General-law city	23,216
14	North Fair Oaks	Census-designated place	14,027
15	Half Moon Bay	General-law city	11,795
16	Hillsborough	General-law city	11,387
17	Atherton	General-law city	7,188
18	El Granada	Census-designated place	5,481
19	Woodside	General-law city	5,309
20	Brisbane	General-law city	4,851
21	Portola Valley	General-law city	4,456
22	Broadmoor	Census-designated place	4,411
23	Emerald Lake Hills	Census-designated place	4,406
24	West Menlo Park	Census-designated place	3,930
25	Moss Beach	Census-designated place	3,214
26	Montara	Census-designated place	2,833
27	Highlands	Census-designated place	2,359
28	Baywood Park	Census-designated place	1,693
29	Ladera	Census-designated place	1,557
30	Colma	General-law city	1,507
31	La Honda	Census-designated place	979
32	Pescadero	Census-designated place	595
33	Loma Mar	Census-designated place	134

== See also ==
- List of school districts in San Mateo County, California
- List of California Historical Landmarks in San Mateo County, California
- National Register of Historic Places listings in San Mateo County, California
- Peninsula Humane Society
- Seaport Centre
- Telephone Area code 650
- Leo J. Ryan Memorial Park
- Leo J. Ryan Federal Building
- Silicon Valley
- Thomas Bones (1842–1929), lumberman in this area
- Second Harvest of Silicon Valley
