= Menlo Oaks, California =

Human settlement in California, United States of America

Coordinates: 37.46917°N 122.1665°W

Menlo Oaks is an unincorporated part of San Mateo County, California. The area, located in the north-east part of Menlo Park, California is a neighborhood bounded by Ringwood Avenue, Bay Road, Berkeley Avenue, Coleman Avenue, and Arlington Way. There are roughly 300 homes in the area. The Peninsula School, now a private K-8 school, is housed in the Coleman Mansion, built in 1882.
