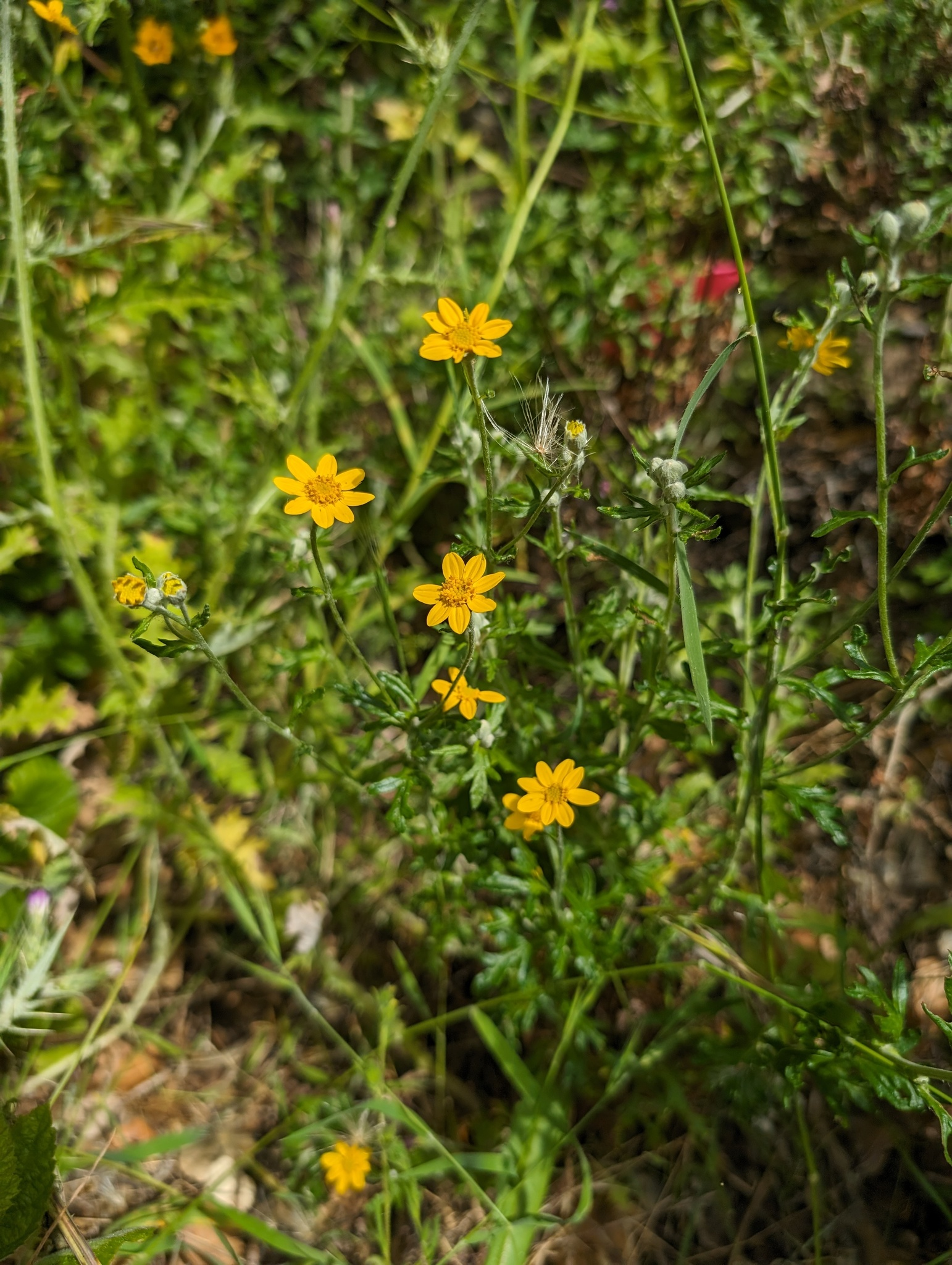

Conservation status
- Critically Imperiled (NatureServe)

Scientific classification
- Kingdom: Plantae
- Clade: Embryophytes
- Clade: Tracheophytes
- Clade: Spermatophytes
- Clade: Angiosperms
- Clade: Eudicots
- Clade: Asterids
- Order: Asterales
- Family: Asteraceae
- Genus: Eriophyllum
- Species: E. latilobum

Binomial name
- Eriophyllum latilobum Rydb.

= Eriophyllum latilobum =

Species of flowering plant

Eriophyllum latilobum, the San Mateo woolly sunflower, is a perennial herb of sharply limited range, endemic and occurring only in the state of California, United States. This flowering plant of the family Asteraceae has been listed as an endangered species by the U.S. federal government as well as the state of California.

== Description ==
Like the other 13 species members of its genus, Eriophyllum latilobum presents generally alternate leaves ranging from entire to nearly compound. The flower heads are grouped in radiate, flat-topped heads, with an hemispheric to nearly conic involucre. Phyllaries are either free, or more or less fused, their receptacle flat, but naked and conic in the center. The ray flowers (the "petals") have yellow ligules entire to lobed. Fruits are 4-angled cylindric achenes in the outer flowers, but are generally club-shaped for the inner flowers; the pappus is somewhat jagged.

Eriophyllum latilobum occurs as a subshrub between 20 and 50 centimeters in height. Its thin leaves are two to six centimeters in length, and have a diamond to obovate shape; the deeply triangular-lobed leaves are smooth on the top surface. The inflorescence's peduncles are one to eight centimeters and the involucres measure four to seven millimeters. The acute, barely overlapping phyllaries number six to ten. The ray flowers number 6-13. The rays surround 40-70 disc flowers, each three to four millimeters in diameter. The strigose (hairy) fruit measures 3-4 millimeters (0.12-0.16 inches), and its pappus can vary between 0.3 and 1.0 millimeters (0.012-0.40 inches). Disc scales are larger than the ray scales. Chromosomes are characterized as: 2n=32.

== Distribution and habitat ==
Eriophyllum latilobum has been found in San Mateo County, San Benito County, and Napa County in habitats of oak woodland, but at altitudes only between 100 and 150 meters. Eriophyllum latilobum grows to 90 centimeters in height on erect woolly stems and produces bright yellow flowers. Latilobum means "with wide lobe," from Latin latus, "wide".

Eriophyllum latilobum occurs primarily in shaded moist positions on steep grassy or sparsely wooded slopes of serpentine soil. The remaining colonies of San Mateo County consist of several hundred plants scattered along a two and one half mile length of Crystal Springs Road. These are most likely the relict fragments of a historically continuous population. Calflora reports sightings in Mariposa County and Riverside County, but both sites are close to major highways and probably represent waifs.

San Mateo woolly sunflower is associated with serpentine soils, which are found in discontinuous outcrops in the Coast Ranges of the San Francisco Bay Area (and other locations not involving E. latilobum). The chief constituent of the parent rock is a variant of iron-magnesium silicate. Many species associated with serpentine soils have status ranging from vulnerable to endangered.

== Conservation ==
The state of California listed E. latilobum as an endangered species in June 1992. Eriophyllum latilobum was designated as endangered by the U.S. Government on February 3, 1995. It is currently designated as an endangered species within its entire range. The species is threatened by urban development which continues to fragment its habitat. The San Mateo County colony is subject to damage by dumping of residential garden debris and downhill surface runoff of pesticides and fertilizers from homes above the steep-sloping habitat along Crystal Springs Road. Invasive plants add to the stress on the San Mateo woolly sunflower population. Furthermore, the steep slopes are subject to mudslides and erosion, and road maintenance crews may not be aware of the existence of colonies and remove mudslides containing E. latilobum organisms and seeds. Crews may also regrade slopes, further destroying colonies.

== See also ==
- Crystal Springs Reservoir
- Serpentine soil
