= West Menlo Park, California =

Unincorporated community in California, United States

West Menlo Park
- census-designated place & unincorporated community
- Location in San Mateo County and the state of California
- Coordinates: 37°26′1″N 122°12′11″W
- Country: United States
- State: California
- County: San Mateo

Area
  - Total: 0.485 sq mi (1.256 km^{2})
  - Land: 0.485 sq mi (1.256 km^{2})
  - Water: 0 sq mi (0 km^{2}) 0%
- Elevation: 112 ft (34 m)

Population (2020)
  - Total: 3,930
  - Density: 8,100/sq mi (3,130/km^{2})
- Time zone: UTC-8 (PST)
  - Summer (DST): UTC-7 (PDT)
- ZIP code: 94025
- Area code: 650
- FIPS code: 06-84536
- GNIS feature ID: 1867071

West Menlo Park is a census-designated place and an unincorporated community in San Mateo County, California, United States, located between the majority of City of Menlo Park, the Town of Atherton, the Sharon Heights neighborhood of Menlo Park and Stanford University (in Santa Clara County). As of the 2020 census, the community had a population of 3,930.

The area consists of suburban housing and a small business district along Alameda de las Pulgas (literally, "Avenue of the Fleas"), often just referred to as "the Alameda", which extends the length of the Rancho de las Pulgas land granted to the Argüello family. West Menlo Park is served by the Las Lomitas School District and Menlo Park Fire District.

== Geography ==
According to the United States Census Bureau, the CDP has a total area of 0.5 square miles (1.3 km^{2}), all land. West Menlo Park has a mild climate.

== Demographics ==
Historical population
Census	Pop.	Note	%±
1990	3,959		—
2000	3,629		−8.3%
2010	3,659		0.8%
2020	3,930		7.4%
U.S. Decennial Census; 1990 2000 2010

=== 2020 census ===
As of the 2020 census, West Menlo Park had a population of 3,930 and a population density of 8,103.1 inhabitants per square mile (3,128.6/km^{2}). The median age was 42.0 years. The age distribution was 28.4% under the age of 18, 5.8% aged 18 to 24, 19.8% aged 25 to 44, 30.8% aged 45 to 64, and 15.3% aged 65 or older. For every 100 females, there were 94.3 males, and for every 100 females age 18 and over, there were 92.5 males.

The census reported that 99.5% of the population lived in households, 0.3% lived in non-institutionalized group quarters, and 0.2% were institutionalized. Also, 100.0% of residents lived in urban areas and 0.0% lived in rural areas.

There were 1,370 households, of which 44.7% had children under the age of 18 living in them. Of all households, 65.7% were married-couple households, 3.5% were cohabiting couple households, 9.2% had a male householder with no spouse or partner present, and 21.6% had a female householder with no spouse or partner present. About 18.8% of all households were made up of individuals, and 9.2% had someone living alone who was 65 years of age or older. The average household size was 2.85. There were 1,052 families (76.8% of all households).

There were 1,468 housing units at an average density of 3,026.8 units per square mile (1,168.7 units/km^{2}), of which 1,370 (93.3%) were occupied. Of those occupied units, 78.8% were owner-occupied and 21.2% were renter-occupied. The homeowner vacancy rate was 0.2%, and the rental vacancy rate was 5.7%.

Racial composition as of the 2020 census
Race	Number	Percent
White	2,586	65.8%
Black or African American	32	0.8%
American Indian and Alaska Native	8	0.2%
Asian	745	19.0%
Native Hawaiian and Other Pacific Islander	4	0.1%
Some other race	81	2.1%
Two or more races	474	12.1%
Hispanic or Latino (of any race)	291	7.4%

=== Income and poverty ===
In 2023, the US Census Bureau estimated that the median household income was more than $250,000, and the per capita income was $165,097. About 0.0% of families and 2.5% of the population were below the poverty line.

=== 2010 census ===
The 2010 United States census reported that West Menlo Park had a population of 3,659. The population density was 7,526.9 inhabitants per square mile (2,906.2/km^{2}). The racial makeup of West Menlo Park was 2,983 (81.5%) White, 28 (0.8%) African American, 2 (0.1%) Native American, 416 (11.4%) Asian, 4 (0.1%) Pacific Islander, 52 (1.4%) from other races, and 174 (4.8%) from two or more races. Hispanic or Latino of any race were 201 persons (5.5%).

The Census reported that 3,650 people (99.8% of the population) lived in households, 5 (0.1%) lived in non-institutionalized group quarters, and 4 (0.1%) were institutionalized.

There were 1,356 households, out of which 574 (42.3%) had children under the age of 18 living in them, 830 (61.2%) were opposite-sex married couples living together, 98 (7.2%) had a female householder with no husband present, 42 (3.1%) had a male householder with no wife present. There were 61 (4.5%) unmarried opposite-sex partnerships, and 11 (0.8%) same-sex married couples or partnerships. 292 households (21.5%) were made up of individuals, and 122 (9.0%) had someone living alone who was 65 years of age or older. The average household size was 2.69. There were 970 families (71.5% of all households); the average family size was 3.17.

The population was spread out, with 1,069 people (29.2%) under the age of 18, 101 people (2.8%) aged 18 to 24, 998 people (27.3%) aged 25 to 44, 1,004 people (27.4%) aged 45 to 64, and 487 people (13.3%) who were 65 years of age or older. The median age was 40.4 years. For every 100 females, there were 95.7 males. For every 100 females age 18 and over, there were 91.1 males.

There were 1,422 housing units at an average density of 2,925.2 per square mile (1,129.4/km^{2}), of which 1,091 (80.5%) were owner-occupied, and 265 (19.5%) were occupied by renters. The homeowner vacancy rate was 0.9%; the rental vacancy rate was 5.3%. 2,999 people (82.0% of the population) lived in owner-occupied housing units and 651 people (17.8%) lived in rental housing units.

== Politics ==
In the California State Legislature, West Menlo Park is in the 13th senatorial district, represented by Democrat Josh Becker, and in the 23rd Assembly district, represented by Democrat Marc Berman.

In the United States House of Representatives, West Menlo Park is in California's 16th congressional district, represented by Democrat Sam Liccardo per the 2020 redistricting cycle.

== Education ==
For primary schools, West Menlo Park is served by the Las Lomitas Elementary School District. For high school, West Menlo Park is served by the Sequoia Union High School District, with all of West Menlo Park falling into the boundaries of Menlo-Atherton High School.
