= Banana Slug String Band =

American children's band

- Years active: 1985–present
- Members: Doug "Dirt" Greenfield; "Airy" Larry Graff; "Solar" Steve Van Zandt; "Marine" Mark Nolan
- Website: www.bananaslugstringband.com

Banana Slug String Band (BSSB), formed in 1985, is a children's band based out of Santa Cruz, California and are self-described as "Environmental Educators".

They focus on live performances at schools assemblies and music festivals. As of 2015, they were playing as many as 150 shows a year performing with costumes and as characters to deliver their environmental messages to children. The Slugs have performed at festivals including the New Orleans Jazz and Heritage Festival, High Sierra Music Festival, and Strawberry Music Festival.

== History ==
BSSB formed in 1985 after meeting at a nature camp in the Santa Cruz Mountains. The four founding members (Doug "Dirt" Greenfield, "Airy" Larry Graff, and "Solar" Steve Van Zandt, and "Marine" Mark Nolan) were teachers and performed music together for the students and sing songs related to the what they had learned that day at camp. Later, the group developed deals and created performances that they began performing at school assemblies and other venues.

BSSB has partnered with many groups in their career, including 30 different ocean conservation organizations that helped fund their album Only One Ocean and they continue to perform at school assemblies.

They've released 12 CDs, along with live recordings.

As of 2026, they still consist of the original four band members. They have won three Parents' Choice Awards, most recently in 2011 for Only One Ocean, along with other awards.

== Related acts ==
Larry Graff is also a member of Painted Mandolin, a Grateful Dead cover band.

== Other ventures ==
Doug "Dirt" Greenfield is a faculty member and program director for Venture West School of Outdoor Living and Exploring New Horizons, and has designed and led outdoors science camps in Northern California.

== Discography ==
Year	Title	Note
1987	Dirt Made My Lunch	
1989	Adventures on the Air Cycle	
1991	Slugs at Sea	
1995	Penguin Parade	
1999	Goin' Wild	
1999	La Tierra Y El Mar	
2002	Singing in Our Garden	
2004	Wings of Slumber	Guest musicians: George Winston and Laurie Lewis
2008	We All Live Downstream	
2011	Only One Ocean	Winner of a 2011 Parents' Choice Award
2019	Pollinator Nation	
