= General-law municipality =

City or municipality in the U.S. whose governance and structure is defined by state law

In the systems of local government in some U.S. states, a general-law municipality, general-law city, code city, or statutory city is a municipality whose government structure and powers are defined by the general law of its state. This is in contrast to a charter city or home-rule city, whose government structure and powers are defined by a municipal charter.

States may allow only general-law municipalities, only charter municipalities, or both. In states having both, general-law municipalities generally have less autonomy than charter municipalities do. Six states do not allow municipal charters, meaning that every municipality is a general-law municipality. Other states may allow or require charters for all municipalities or may allow charters only for municipalities meeting certain criteria, requiring other municipalities to be general-law municipalities.

== Alaska ==
In Alaska, a city may be a home-rule or general-law city, and a borough may be a home-rule or general-law borough. A home-rule city or borough may exercise all legislative powers not prohibited by law or by its charter, while a general-law city or borough has those powers authorized by state law.

== California ==
In California, a general-law city has only those powers expressly granted or necessarily incident to those expressly granted. Any fair, reasonable doubt is resolved against the exercise of such powers. A general-law city may have only a form of government authorized by state general law.

== Michigan ==
In Michigan, villages can be general-law villages, governed under the General Law Village Act (Act 3 of 1895), or home-rule villages having charters.

== Minnesota ==
In Minnesota, cities are either statutory cities or home rule charter cities. Statutory cities may select from three forms of organization, although one form is available only to statutory cities having populations above 1,000. Statutory cities are run according to rules laid down in Chapter 412 of the Minnesota Statutes.

== Texas ==
In Texas, only cities of more than 5,000 inhabitants may become, upon voter approval of a city charter, home-rule cities; the rest must be general-law cities. General-law cities have only those powers that state law expressly or implicitly authorizes. By contrast, home-rule cities may assume any power not prohibited by the state constitution or state laws. General-law municipalities are classified by population as type A, B, or C, with different options for their forms of government. In the event a home-rule city's population falls below 5,000, it may retain home rule status.

== Washington ==
In Washington (state), a code city is a city operating under the state's Optional Municipal Code rather than a charter.
