= Emerald Lake Hills, California =

Emerald Lake Hills
- Census-designated place
- Location in San Mateo County and the state of California

- Location in the United States
- Coordinates: 37°27′52″N 122°15′59″W
- Country: United States
- State: California
- County: San Mateo

Area
  - Total: 1.189 sq mi (3.079 km^{2})
  - Land: 1.182 sq mi (3.062 km^{2})
  - Water: 0.0066 sq mi (0.017 km^{2}) 0.56%
- Elevation: 518 ft (158 m)

Population (2020)
  - Total: 4,406
  - Density: 3,727/sq mi (1,439/km^{2})
- Time zone: UTC-8 (PST)
  - Summer (DST): UTC-7 (PDT)
- ZIP code: 94062
- Area code: 650
- FIPS code: 06-22587
- GNIS feature ID: 1867022

Emerald Lake Hills or Emerald Hills is a census-designated place and neighborhood in unincorporated San Mateo County, in the state of California, United States. Situated among oak-studded hills between Woodside, Redwood City, and San Carlos roughly bounded by Edgewood Road, Alameda de las Pulgas, Farm Hill Boulevard, and Interstate 280. The population was 4,406 at the 2020 census and the per-capita income was $68,966, making it the 22nd wealthiest place in California and the 82nd highest income places in the United States

Emerald Lake Hills was originally conceived as a resort community for city-weary San Franciscans during World War I. Emerald Lake Hills actually consists of two large subdivisions created around 1920: Emerald Lake (even though there are two lakes) and Emerald Hills. Residents refer to the area by either Emerald Hills or by Emerald Lake Hills. The name Emerald Hills is now more commonly adopted due to mailing designation rules, as the U.S. Post Office would allow only a two-word name.

According to an interview with Yuji Naka, Emerald Hills is the namesake for the famous Emerald Hill Zone, the first level of Sonic the Hedgehog 2.

== Points of interest ==
Edgewood County Park and Natural Preserve
Renowned throughout the San Francisco Bay Area for its spectacular display of spring wildflowers, Edgewood Park occupies 467 acres (1.89 km^{2}) of grasslands, chaparral, and wooded foothills between Highway 280 and the homes of Emerald Hills. Known for its biotic diversity, this small wilderness was declared a permanent natural preserve in 1993 with support from the EHHA, thus protecting it from any future development. The park has four entrances: Old Stage Coach Road off Edgewood Road, the Sunset Trailhead off Hillcrest Way, Clarkia Way off Cañada Road, and the Sylvan Way Access. A well-maintained system of trails is open for hikers, joggers, and equestrians.

Emerald Lakes
Named for the distinctive emerald green water that fills them, the two lakes created by the original developers of Emerald Hills still exist to enhance the beauty of the area. While Upper Emerald Lake on Jefferson Avenue is privately held by the owners of its surrounding shoreline, Lower Emerald Lake is owned and operated by the Emerald Lake Country Club. Formed in 1920, the club is located at 500 Lake Boulevard on the intersection of Oak Knoll and Vista Drive. Club members and their families enjoy swimming, sunbathing, picnicking, and fishing in Lower Emerald Lake during the summer months.

Handley Rock Park
Located on Handley Trail Way in the center of Emerald Hills, Handley Rock Park features a monolith of sandstone of 50 feet (15 m), the largest formation of its kind in San Mateo County Situated on a lot of 0.5 acres (2,000 m^{2}), this County-approved private park is operated by the Handley Rock Association, a group of local residents and rock-climbing enthusiasts.

== Early history ==
Emerald Lake Hills is located in what was once the 35,000-acre (140 km^{2}) Rancho de las Pulgas ("Flea Ranch"). This land was granted in 1795 to José Darío Argüello, one of the last governors of Spanish California. The land was later passed on to his son, Luis Antonio Argüello, who in 1822 became California's first native, elected governor. Luis Argüello died in 1830, probably never having lived on the Rancho. In 1835, the Mexican government officially granted land ownership rights to his heirs.

Luis Argüello's widow, Soledad Ortega, did move to the ranch; her home was near what is now Argüello Park in San Carlos. Some accounts say she moved to the ranch right after his death; others say it was in the 1840s, during the Mexican War, when U.S. troops were occupying California.

== Early statehood ==
In the early 1850s, Mexico having ceded California and gold having been discovered, there was a huge rush for land. Squatters began occupying the Argüello rancho amid rumors that the family's title to the ranch was no good. The Argüellos hired lawyer Simon Mezes to defend their claim. His payment was 15 percent of their land, a prime bayfront parcel. Mezesville later became Redwood City, port for the logging industry.

Before Soledad Argüello died in 1874, the rancho would be further divided. By the mid-1850s, legislator Horace Hawes had a big parcel between Whipple and Woodside roads, with a house on the site of Sequoia High School. Hawes used a former stock pond on the ranch for irrigation—the pond that would become Lower Emerald Lake. By 1885 the northern part of Hawes' estate had been bought by Moses Hopkins (brother of Mark Hopkins), who dammed the pond to increase its capacity. An existing rock wall at Rose Gate, a home on Lakeview Way above the lake, is said to be a boundary wall of the Argüello ranch, suggesting that the western sections of the original parcel remained intact toward the around the start of the 20th century.

== Roaring '20s resort ==
In the early 1920s, San Francisco developers had an eye on the area as a site for recreational summer homes. The name Emerald Hills was first used in a 1920 brochure distributed by George Irvine, who had big plans but inadequate cash . When he lost the property near the lake, it was purchased by Charles Holt, the Anglo-California Bank employee assigned to the foreclosure. Holt brought in builder George Leonard, and Emerald Lake Hills became the prime property of the Leonard & Holt Real Estate & Mortgage Co. (Another of their projects was Ingleside Terraces, on Junipero Serra Boulevard and Ocean Avenue in San Francisco.) Early on in the development, Irvine's original sewer system became overtaxed and the dam burst; Leonard and Holt had to drain the lake and rebuild the dam.

The developers aimed their marketing at San Francisco families, emphasizing the proximity of Emerald Lake Hills as a weekend or vacation retreat and especially singing the praises of its largely fog-free climate. They cited the "climate best by government test" and compared it to "the eternal summer which Lord Byron ascribed to Greece." A Leonard & Holt newsletter says the area "rivals the beauty of fine old European towns," and predicts it will become a resort famous throughout California. The company would regularly bus potential buyers in for free picnics at the lakes. A golf course was built atop the hill to the north of the lake, with the clubhouse at 530 Lakeview Way.

In 1926, 20 land owners of lakeside homes banded together and bought the lake to increase the value of their properties. They established their consortium as the Emerald Lake Country Club, and their grant deed forbid the construction of "any barroom, livery stable, hospital or undertakertaking establishment". One of the early members of the Country Club was famous San Francisco attorney Vince Hallinan, who led the campaign against a swim dress code, citing the chic European women he'd seen in modern swimwear.

With the lake out of their hands, Leonard and Holt decided to build another, Emerald Lake No. 2 or Upper Emerald Lake. It was to be the centerpiece of the 3,000-resident community the Highlands of Emerald Lake. By summer 1927 they had built the lake by damming a creek and had created a beach, water slide, diving platforms and a playground with "equipment of the most novel design." The lake's clubhouse was what is now the residence at Lakeview and Edgecliff; (it was owned and restored by the Kenneth McBain family from 1964 until 2012); a structure at Lakeview and Jefferson is recalled as a roadhouse.

By 1927, 30 miles (48 km) of roads in the Emerald Lakes area had been completed, most of them paved. In 1929, the Easter Bowl, an outdoor amphitheater, was built at the crest of California Way, and a large concrete cross above it at the high point of the development. (The cross would later be vandalized and rebuilt larger—at 94 feet (29 m), nearly as tall as the cross atop San Francisco's Mount Davidson—which is just a bit taller at 103 feet (31 m). Tony Gardenier related to the Tum Sudens along with the other family owners who had deep ties attempted to keep this cross lighted nightly, but the city council found it too expensive. The Tum Sudens, owned the upper property from Tum Suden Way, to their estate down the hill just east of Jefferson Ave. The hand prints of two of the boys Tony and Ricky who perished in swimming pool are pressed into the cement. From Jefferson Ave., across from the upper home on Tum Suden Way, are 2 stone columns hidden among the trees. The lower estate would eventually be sold to the Elks Club.

In the late 1920s, Leonard and Holt aggressively marketed Upper Emerald Lake to San Franciscans. However; the stock market crash hit both Emerald Lake developments hard. The golf course was sold and became the Wellbanks tract. The upper lake and an adjacent area of 17 acres (69,000 m^{2}) were sold in 1938 to Simpson Reinhard, a prominent jewelry store owner.

== After the war ==
Within a few years of the end of World War II, Emerald Hills was making the transition from a vacation resort to a residential area, albeit a rustic one. The Emerald Lake Homeowners Association was established in the 1950s to contest the planned routing of an interstate highway through the neighborhood. (Completed in the early 1970s, Interstate 280 runs west of Emerald Hills, sticking close to the San Andreas Fault.) In the adjacent Farm Hill subdivision—part of Redwood City—kids discovered mercury in 1955 on the property of Andy Oddstad. The mercury market was not as vigorous, however, as it was in the years when the New Almaden Quicksilver Mine was a major industry in San Jose; the most visible result of the Farm Hill discovery today is a street named Silver Hill.

In 1968, Emerald Hills had 430 families, of which 110, about 25 percent, had resided there less than a year and 180 from one to nine years; four years later, the newcomer rate had dropped to 10 percent. Also near the lake was a convent occupied by Franciscan sisters from 1967–70; the order then built a large compound, Mount Alverno, adjacent to the Elks golf course. In 2008 it was sold to the Buddhist order Shinnyo-en, which currently uses it as their U.S. Head Temple.

A survey of homeowners at this time showed that, having staved off the interstate threat, they were most concerned with keeping the neighborhood's rustic nature. On the whole, they opposed annexation to Redwood City, and supported bigger lot sizes for a maximum of 1,400 homes in the area, more trails, and preservation of the lakes and two unique features, the Easter Cross and Handley's Rock. At the time, a large parcel adjacent to the proposed freeway at the community's northern edge was being considered for a possible Cal State campus. That plan was abandoned, and, because the presence of a little butterfly called the bay checkerspot helped lead to the defeat of attempts to build a golf course there, the land is now Edgewood County Park.

== Maxing out ==
Emerald Hills used septic tanks until the early 1980s, a factor that limited building: In 1982, the year the sewer system was installed, the neighborhood had 900 homes. A building moratorium from the late 1970s to 1986 forestalled the boom—but by 1992, the count had boomed to 1,400, eliminating most of the vacant lots. Many of the new homes were large and expensive. Among the new residents were several players of the San Francisco 49ers, including Joe Montana, as the team was then training in nearby Redwood City. Today, only a few lots remain open, and though building of homes continues, most of them are on the sites of former cabins and vacation homes.

== Resolved issues ==
Annexation is no longer an issue. Trails are limited to the parkland, though residents have been successful in limiting road width.

Upper Lake is owned by 11 households that border it. Lower Lake is owned by 50 families, and open to 105 more as summer club members.

The Easter Cross remains standing, visible to highway drivers as far south as Palo Alto. The Easter Bowl, however, was abandoned in the early 1980s, and the traditional services and animal parade are no longer held.

Handley's Rock was bequeathed as public land by its owner, and has remained open to public despite neighboring residents' complaints of noise and fire danger.

== Geography ==
Emerald Lake Hills is located at 37°27′52″N 122°15′59″W (37.464388, -122.266389).

According to the United States Census Bureau, the neighborhood has a total area of 1.2 square miles (3.1 km^{2}), of which 1.2 square miles (3.1 km^{2}) is land and 0.56% is water.

== Demographics ==
Historical population
Census	Pop.	Note	%±
1990	3,328		—
2000	3,899		17.2%
2010	4,278		9.7%
2020	4,406		3.0%
U.S. Decennial Census; 1990 2000 2010

=== 2020 census ===
As of the 2020 census, Emerald Lake Hills had a population of 4,406, and the population density was 3,727.6 inhabitants per square mile (1,439.2/km^{2}). The median age was 47.8 years. 19.7% of residents were under the age of 18 and 20.7% of residents were 65 years of age or older. For every 100 females there were 97.1 males, and for every 100 females age 18 and over there were 96.8 males age 18 and over.

The census reported that 99.3% of the population lived in households, 0.6% lived in non-institutionalized group quarters, and 0.2% were institutionalized. In addition, 100.0% of residents lived in urban areas, while 0.0% lived in rural areas.

There were 1,603 households, out of which 31.7% had children under the age of 18 living in them. Of all households, 69.9% were married-couple households, 5.6% were cohabiting couple households, 10.7% had a male householder with no spouse or partner present, and 13.8% had a female householder with no spouse or partner present. About 14.6% of households were made up of individuals and 8.4% had someone living alone who was 65 years of age or older. The average household size was 2.73. There were 1,273 families (79.4% of all households).

The age distribution was 19.7% under the age of 18, 6.4% aged 18 to 24, 19.8% aged 25 to 44, 33.4% aged 45 to 64, and 20.7% who were 65 years of age or older.

There were 1,665 housing units at an average density of 1,408.6 units per square mile (543.9 units/km^{2}), of which 1,603 (96.3%) were occupied. Of these, 88.8% were owner-occupied, and 11.2% were occupied by renters. The homeowner vacancy rate was 0.2% and the rental vacancy rate was 3.2%.

Racial composition as of the 2020 census
Race	Number	Percent
White	3,304	75.0%
Black or African American	37	0.8%
American Indian and Alaska Native	4	0.1%
Asian	469	10.6%
Native Hawaiian and Other Pacific Islander	9	0.2%
Some other race	90	2.0%
Two or more races	493	11.2%
Hispanic or Latino (of any race)	348	7.9%

=== Income and poverty ===
In 2023, the US Census Bureau estimated that the median household income was more than $250,000, and the per capita income was $166,476. About 0.0% of families and 1.1% of the population were below the poverty line.

=== 2010 census ===
The 2010 United States census reported that Emerald Lake Hills had a population of 4,278. The population density was 3,557.4 inhabitants per square mile (1,373.5/km^{2}). The racial makeup of Emerald Lake Hills was 3,655 (85.4%) White, 39 (0.9%) African American, 5 (0.1%) Native American, 322 (7.5%) Asian, 15 (0.4%) Pacific Islander, 56 (1.3%) from other races, and 186 (4.3%) from two or more races. Hispanic or Latino of any race were 288 persons (6.7%).

The Census reported that 4,252 people (99.4% of the population) lived in households, 26 (0.6%) lived in non-institutionalized group quarters, and 0 (0%) were institutionalized.

There were 1,550 households, out of which 554 (35.7%) had children under the age of 18 living in them, 1,106 (71.4%) were opposite-sex married couples living together, 82 (5.3%) had a female householder with no husband present, 43 (2.8%) had a male householder with no wife present. There were 66 (4.3%) unmarried opposite-sex partnerships, and 22 (1.4%) same-sex married couples or partnerships. 212 households (13.7%) were made up of individuals, and 80 (5.2%) had someone living alone who was 65 years of age or older. The average household size was 2.74. There were 1,231 families (79.4% of all households); the average family size was 3.03.

The population was spread out, with 976 people (22.8%) under the age of 18, 222 people (5.2%) aged 18 to 24, 845 people (19.8%) aged 25 to 44, 1,682 people (39.3%) aged 45 to 64, and 553 people (12.9%) who were 65 years of age or older. The median age was 46.0 years. For every 100 females, there were 99.1 males. For every 100 females age 18 and over, there were 97.3 males.

There were 1,614 housing units at an average density of 1,342.1 per square mile (518.2/km^{2}), of which 1,402 (90.5%) were owner-occupied, and 148 (9.5%) were occupied by renters. The homeowner vacancy rate was 1.1%; the rental vacancy rate was 7.4%. 3,873 people (90.5% of the population) lived in owner-occupied housing units and 379 people (8.9%) lived in rental housing units.

== Education ==
Residents are zoned to primary schools in the Redwood City School District and secondary schools in the Sequoia Union High School District .

Elementary school children who choose to attend their neighborhood school in the northern half of the CDP attend Clifford School, while those in the southern half attend Roy Cloud School. Children may also attend schools with specialized focus, like North Star Academy (academics), or Adelante (Spanish immersion).

Most high school children in Emerald Lake Hills are assigned to Woodside High School , but may request transfer to any Sequoia Union District school or apply to public charter high schools like Summit or Everest.

== Government ==
In the California State Legislature, Emerald Lake Hills is in the 13th senatorial district, represented by Democrat Josh Becker, and in the 21st Assembly district, represented by Democrat Diane Papan.

In the United States House of Representatives, Emerald Lake Hills is in California's 15th congressional district, represented by Democrat Kevin Mullin.
