= Broadmoor, California =

Unincorporated community in California, United States

Broadmoor
- Census-designated place
- Location in San Mateo County and the state of California

- Location in the United States
- Coordinates: 37°41′33″N 122°28′44″W
- Country: United States
- State: California
- County: San Mateo

Area
  - Total: 0.43 sq mi (1.12 km^{2})
  - Land: 0.43 sq mi (1.12 km^{2})
  - Water: 0 sq mi (0.00 km^{2}) 0%
- Elevation: 348 ft (106 m)

Population (2020)
  - Total: 4,411
  - Density: 10,211.4/sq mi (3,942.63/km^{2})
- Time zone: UTC-8 (PST)
  - Summer (DST): UTC-7 (PDT)
- ZIP code: 94014, 94015
- Area code: 650
- FIPS code: 06-08338
- GNIS feature ID: 0255917

Broadmoor is a census-designated place (CDP) in an unincorporated area of San Mateo County, California, United States. The enclave is entirely surrounded by Daly City. The population was 4,411 at the 2020 census.

== Geography ==
Broadmoor is located at 37°41′33″N 122°28′44″W (37.692433, -122.478901).

According to the United States Census Bureau, the CDP has a total area of 0.432 square mile, all land.

== Demographics ==
Historical population
Census	Pop.	Note	%±
1990	3,739		—
2000	4,026		7.7%
2010	4,176		3.7%
2020	4,411		5.6%
U.S. Decennial Census; 1850–1870 1880-1890; 1900 1910 1920; 1930 1940 1950; 1960 1970 1980; 1990 2000 2010

=== 2020 census ===
As of the 2020 census, Broadmoor had a population of 4,411. The population density was 10,210.6 inhabitants per square mile (3,942.3/km^{2}). The median age was 42.4 years, and 19.1% were age 65 or older. For every 100 females, there were 98.7 males, and for every 100 females age 18 and over there were 96.3 males age 18 and over. 100.0% of residents lived in urban areas and 0.0% lived in rural areas.

There were 1,427 households in Broadmoor, of which 31.0% had children under the age of 18 living in them. Of all households, 57.4% were married-couple households, 15.8% were households with a male householder and no spouse or partner present, and 22.5% were households with a female householder and no spouse or partner present. About 18.1% of all households were made up of individuals, and 8.3% had someone living alone who was 65 years of age or older. There were 1,464 housing units, of which 2.5% were vacant; the homeowner vacancy rate was 0.2% and the rental vacancy rate was 3.7%.

3,658 people (82.9%) were age 18 or older, while 753 (17.1%) were under age 18. 65 people (1.5%) were living in group quarters, including 20 in nursing facilities and 45 in other facilities.

Racial composition as of the 2020 census
Race	Number	Percent
White	1,206	27.3%
Black or African American	77	1.7%
American Indian and Alaska Native	43	1.0%
Asian	2,084	47.2%
Native Hawaiian and Other Pacific Islander	38	0.9%
Some other race	466	10.6%
Two or more races	497	11.3%
Hispanic or Latino (of any race)	982	22.3%

Among residents who were not Hispanic or Latino, 1,060 were White, 65 were Black or African American, 14 were American Indian and Alaska Native, 2,061 were Asian, 34 were Native Hawaiians or other Pacific Islanders, 25 were Some Other Race, and 170 were of two or more races. Among Hispanic or Latino residents, 146 identified their race as White, 12 as Black or African American, 29 as American Indian and Alaska Native, 23 as Asian, 4 as Native Hawaiian and Other Pacific Islander, 441 as Some Other Race, and 327 as two or more races; 250 identified as both White and Some Other Race.

=== Income and poverty ===
In 2023, the US Census Bureau estimated that the median household income was $161,572, and the per capita income was $58,511. About 0.0% of families and 2.0% of the population were below the poverty line.

=== 2010 census ===
At the 2010 census Broadmoor had a population of 4,176. The population density was 9,277.0 inhabitants per square mile (3,581.9/km^{2}). The racial makeup of Broadmoor was 1,705 (40.8%) White, 100 (2.4%) African American, 30 (0.7%) Native American, 1,676 (40.1%) Asian, 44 (1.1%) Pacific Islander, 359 (8.6%) from other races, and 262 (6.3%) from two or more races. Hispanic or Latino of any race were 981 people (23.5%).

The census reported that 4,076 people (97.6% of the population) lived in households, 68 (1.6%) lived in non-institutionalized group quarters, and 32 (0.8%) were institutionalized.

There were 1,349 households, 461 (34.2%) had children under the age of 18 living in them, 782 (58.0%) were opposite-sex married couples living together, 163 (12.1%) had a female householder with no husband present, 80 (5.9%) had a male householder with no wife present. There were 64 (4.7%) unmarried opposite-sex partnerships, and 12 (0.9%) same-sex married couples or partnerships. 227 households (16.8%) were one person and 110 (8.2%) had someone living alone who was 65 or older. The average household size was 3.02. There were 1,025 families (76.0% of households); the average family size was 3.40.

The age distribution was 854 people (20.5%) under the age of 18, 345 people (8.3%) aged 18 to 24, 1,095 people (26.2%) aged 25 to 44, 1,228 people (29.4%) aged 45 to 64, and 654 people (15.7%) who were 65 or older. The median age was 41.7 years. For every 100 females, there were 95.9 males. For every 100 females age 18 and over, there were 93.9 males.

There were 1,392 housing units at an average density of 3,092.3 per square mile, of the occupied units 1,037 (76.9%) were owner-occupied and 312 (23.1%) were rented. The homeowner vacancy rate was 0.7%; the rental vacancy rate was 1.9%. 2,981 people (71.4% of the population) lived in owner-occupied housing units and 1,095 people (26.2%) lived in rental housing units.

== History ==
The farms that had long graced the area started to give way to suburban housing developments from the 1940s onwards. The residents of Broadmoor, rallying around their police protection district and their sense of identity as a separate community, have been mostly successful in fighting off annexation by Daly City, despite losing slices of their community's territory, including its police headquarters, in the many piecemeal annexations which over the years saw Daly City gradually encircle Broadmoor in its entirety. Daly City's attempts to annex the enclave and Broadmoor residents' resistance to those efforts have led to strained relations between the two entities at times.

== Public safety ==
A special property tax assessment funds the Broadmoor Police Department, which was founded in 1948 after residents grew concerned of long response times from the San Mateo County Sheriff's Department—most of whose deputies are based in the southern end of the county. The Broadmoor Police Protection District is governed by a Police Commission, the Broadmoor Police Protection District Board of Police Commissioners, which consists of three residents elected at large every four years. In 2007 State Senator Leland Yee (California's Eighth District) authored legislation sponsored by the Broadmoor Police Department to recognize Broadmoor as a municipal or city police department. Senate Bill 230, which was signed by Governor Schwarzenegger, provides Broadmoor Police with the same legal recognition and status of a city or municipal police department. The Broadmoor Police Department is staffed by eight full-time police officers, including the chief of police, and twenty-five part-time police officers.

As of 2021, an investigation of retirement fraud and misuse of public funds by former top employees of the District is ongoing. The former police chief, Michael Connolly, was sentenced to probation for conflict-of-interest charges.

Fire protection is provided by the Colma Fire Protection District. The Colma Fire Protection District also provides 24 hr paramedic (ALS) coverage 365 days a year. It is staffed with one paramedic at all times.

== Government ==
In the California State Legislature, Broadmoor is in the 11th senatorial district, represented by Democrat Scott Wiener, and in the 19th Assembly district, represented by Democrat Catherine Stefani.

In the United States House of Representatives, Broadmoor is in California's 15th congressional district, represented by Democrat Kevin Mullin.
