= Argüello =

- Place of origin: Spain

Argüello (Spanish pronunciation: [aɾˈɣweʎo]) is a Spanish surname, most commonly associated with the early settlers in the cities of Granada, Nicaragua and of Córdoba, Argentina, as well as throughout Mexico and, in the United States, in what is now the state of California, the so-called Californio Argüellos.

== Notable people named Argüello ==
=== Argentina ===
- Jorge Argüello (born 1956), politician and diplomat
- Roberto Argüello (born 1963), former tennis player
- Irma Arguello, (b. 1970) international security expert
- Facundo Argüello (footballer) (born 1979), footballer
- Martín Vassallo Argüello (born 1980), former tennis player
- Marcos Argüello (born 1981), goalkeeper
- Facundo Argüello (tennis) (born 1992), tennis player

=== Mexico ===
- Ricardo Arguello, Mexican sprinter in the 1932 Olympics
- Alejandro Argüello (born 1982), Mexican footballer

=== Nicaragua ===
- Leonardo Argüello Barreto (1875–1947), politician, President of Nicaragua in May 1947
- Mariano Argüello Vargas (1890–1970), politician
- Mariana Sansón Argüello (1918–2002), poet, painter and artist
- Miriam Argüello, (1927–2019), politician and lawyer
- Silvio Argüello Cardenal, (1929–2024), politician
- Jorge Salazar Argüello, (1939–1980), coffee grower, leader of UPANIC (Union of Agricultural Producers of Nicaragua)
- Patrick Argüello Ryan (1943–1970), Nicaraguan-American hijacker
- Carlos Argüello Gómez (1946–), lawyer and diplomat
- Alexis Argüello Bohórquez (1952–2009) boxer, politician, Mayor of Managua
- Dora María Téllez Argüello, (1955–), Minister of Health (1979–1985)

=== United States ===
- José Darío Argüello (1753–1828), Californio politician, soldier and ranchero
- Luis Antonio Argüello (1784–1830), Californio politician
- Concepción Argüello (1791–1857), Californio socialite
- Santiago Argüello (1791–1862), Mexican Californio
- Maria Soledad Ortega (de Arguello) (1797–1874), Californio ranchera
- Santiago E. Argüello (1813–1857), Mexican Californio
- Christine Arguello (1955–), United States District Judge
- Marcella Arguello (1985–), US comedian

=== Other ===
- Manuel Argüello Mora (1834–1902), Costa Rican writer and novelist.
- Carlos Anibal Altamirano Argüello (1942–2015), Ecuadorian Roman Catholic bishop
- Francisco Argüello (born 1982), Paraguayan footballer
- Betzabeth Argüello (born 1991), Venezuelan freestyle wrestler
