= Adelante Selby Spanish Immersion School =

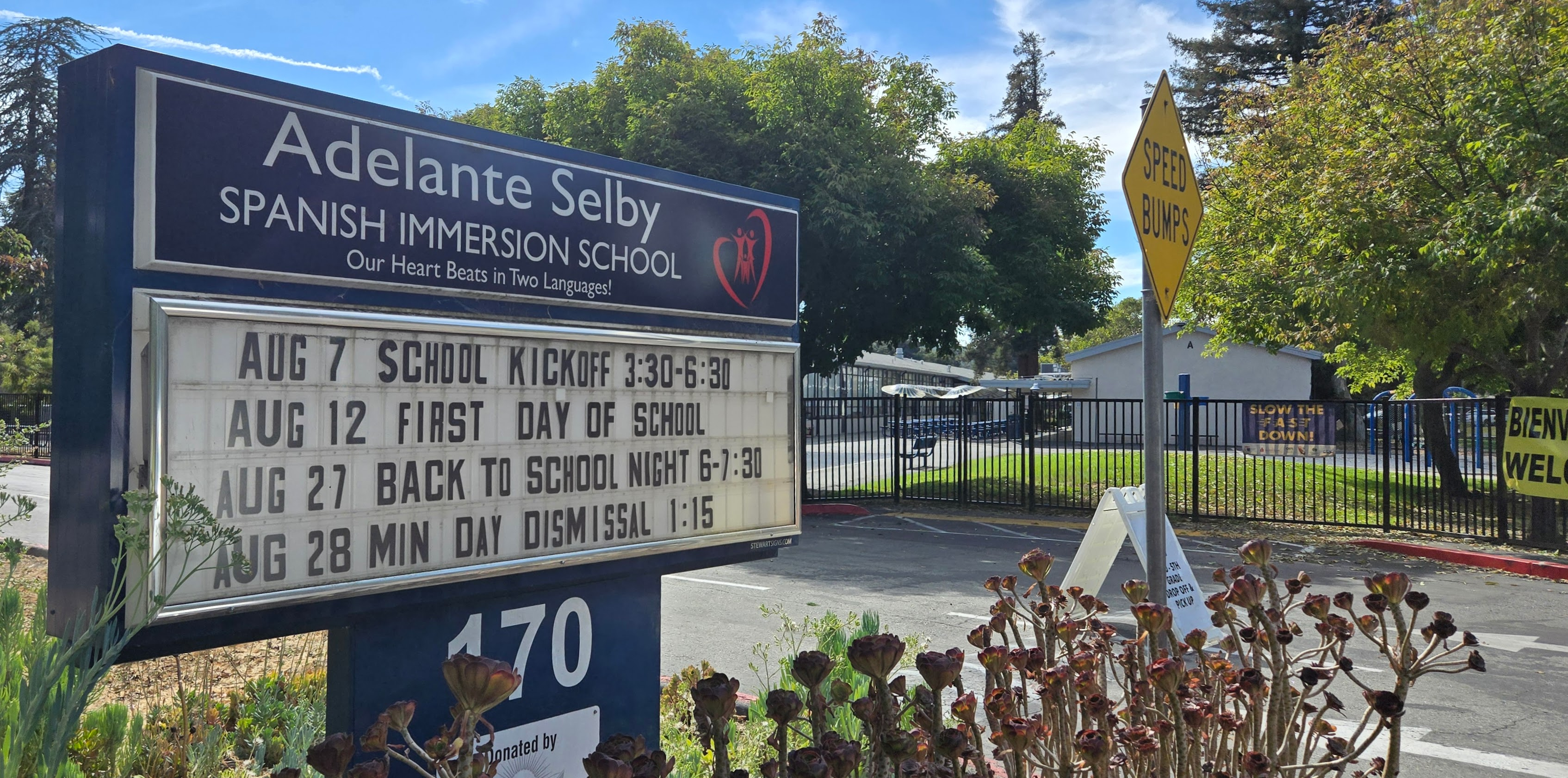

Location
- 170 Selby Lane; Atherton, California 94027; United States; 37°27′29″N 122°13′13″W

Information
- Former name: Selby Lane Elementary School
- Type: Public magnet school (Spanish two-way immersion)
- Established: 2019 (merged school); renamed 2020
- School district: Redwood City School District
- Grades: TK–5
- Enrollment: 582 (2023–24)
- Website: adelanteselby.rcsdk8.net

Adelante Selby Spanish Immersion School is a public magnet elementary school in Atherton, California, operated by the Redwood City School District (RCSD). The school offers a Spanish–English two-way immersion program for grades TK–5 and was formed in 2019 by merging the Spanish immersion program of Adelante Spanish Immersion School in Redwood City with the immersion strand at Selby Lane Elementary School, on the Selby Lane campus. The merged school adopted its current name for the 2020–21 school year.

== History ==
=== Selby Lane Elementary School ===
Dedication plaque on the campus, dated 1950

The Redwood City Elementary School District built Selby Lane School in 1949 and 1950. The Atherton Town Council granted a use permit in March 1949, after nearly two years of dispute over the school's location and layout, for a ten-classroom building on a 5.5-acre site. The building, by contractor J. C. Peterson of San Carlos, was finished in July 1950 at a cost of $146,144. It opened on September 11, 1950, for kindergarten through sixth grade, with Ransom Rideout as principal. A bronze plaque on the campus, dated 1950, names the district's three trustees and its superintendent, Andrew Spinas. The school remained at 170 Selby Lane as an RCSD neighborhood school. In 2017–18, 70.2% of its students qualified for free or reduced-price lunch and about half were English language learners. Before the 2019 reorganization, Selby Lane served preschool through eighth grade with an enrollment of roughly 700 students.

Selby Lane began its own Spanish immersion strand in 2014, started by bilingual teacher (later principal) Warren Sedar; by 2018 the strand enrolled about 250 students alongside the school's traditional English program.

=== Adelante Spanish Immersion School ===
Adelante Spanish Immersion School opened on September 2, 1994, at 3150 Granger Way in Redwood City as a K–5 magnet school offering RCSD's Spanish two-way immersion program. The campus closed on June 30, 2019, as part of the district's consolidation plan, with an enrollment of 464 at the time of the closure vote.

=== 2018 consolidation and merger ===
In November 2018, RCSD trustees voted to close four campuses (Adelante, Fair Oaks, Hawes, and Orion). District officials cited a budget deficit and enrollment that had declined by roughly 2,000 students over six years, which they attributed to high housing costs and competition from charter schools; the closures were projected to save about $4 million. Under the plan, Adelante's immersion program moved to the Selby Lane campus and merged with Selby Lane's immersion strand, while Selby Lane's non-immersion students were reassigned to other district schools with enrollment priority. The middle school grades were discontinued, and the campus became a districtwide school of choice without an attendance boundary.

Parents at Adelante, Selby Lane, and Fair Oaks spoke against the proposal at board meetings; opponents quoted in press coverage argued the plan would break up existing school communities. Sedar, who had started the Selby Lane immersion strand, was named principal of the merged school in January 2019.

The merged school operated during 2019–20 under the interim name "Adelante Selby Lane Spanish Immersion School." The name Adelante Selby Spanish Immersion School took effect for the 2020–21 school year.

== Academics and enrollment ==
Adelante Selby serves grades TK–5; students completing fifth grade continue the district's Spanish immersion program in grades 6–8 at Kennedy Middle School in Redwood City. Federal data for 2023–24 reported an enrollment of 582 students.

== Campus and ball field ==
The campus occupies a site on Selby Lane in Atherton near the boundary with unincorporated North Fair Oaks.

The school's baseball field dates to 1951, the school's first spring. The Parent Teacher Association set aside $400 from a fundraiser to grade and seed a field on school land in county territory, and the district agreed to supply a water line and a backstop. Fathers of pupils helped lay the water pipe that May. In 1997, during the dispute over the Menlo-Atherton Little League's proposed field at Holbrook-Palmer Park, Selby Lane's principal offered the school's baseball field to the league as an alternative site; Redwood City officials objected, saying the Redwood City Highlanders Little League had used the field, scheduled through the city's parks and recreation department, nearly nightly during the season for roughly thirty years.

In 2001, the Giants Community Fund and the Good Tidings Foundation, a Bay Area charity that partners with professional sports teams to refurbish youth athletic facilities, funded and managed a complete refurbishment of the field, including new sod, irrigation, basepath cinder, fencing, a backstop, and cement work, under the fund's Fields for Kids program. At the time, the field was used by children in the Redwood City chapter of the fund's Junior Giants youth baseball league, many of whom attended Selby Lane School.

The refurbished field was rededicated in a ceremony at the school on October 25, 2001, with Baseball Hall of Famer Willie McCovey, who played 19 of his 22 major league seasons with the San Francisco Giants, serving as honorary chair. In an October 17, 2001 proclamation signed by Mayor Dianne M. Fisher, the Atherton City Council declared October 25, 2001 "Willie McCovey Day" in the town in recognition of his role in the rededication. Giants broadcaster Ted Robinson, who emceed the dedication, dubbed the stand of redwoods beyond right field "McCovey Grove".

An open field of slightly more than one acre at the rear of the school property lies on unincorporated San Mateo County land. In February 2023, the Atherton City Council directed staff to consider annexing the parcel as a potential site for multifamily housing, including housing for school staff, as part of the town's housing element planning; any development decision would rest with RCSD as the property owner. The proposal did not advance: in July 2023, Council member Rick DeGolia said annexation of part of the school campus was unlikely to occur during the 2023–31 Regional Housing Needs Allocation cycle. The California Department of Housing and Community Development certified Atherton's 2023–31 housing element on May 5, 2025.

== See also ==
- Redwood City School District
- Two-way immersion education
