= Arguello (surname) =

Arguello (Spanish pronunciation: [aɾˈɣeʎo]) is a Spanish surname. Notable people with the surname include:

- Casimiro Abdon Irala Arguello (1936–2024), known as Padre Irala, Paraguayan-Brazilian Jesuit priest, writer, musician and songwriter
- Christine Arguello (born 1955), American lawyer, jurist and judge
- Irma Arguello, Argentine international security expert
- Marcella Arguello (born 1985), American comedian
- Ricardo Arguello (fl. 1932), Mexican sprinter
