= Bust of Soledad Ortega de Argüello =

Statue in Redwood City, California

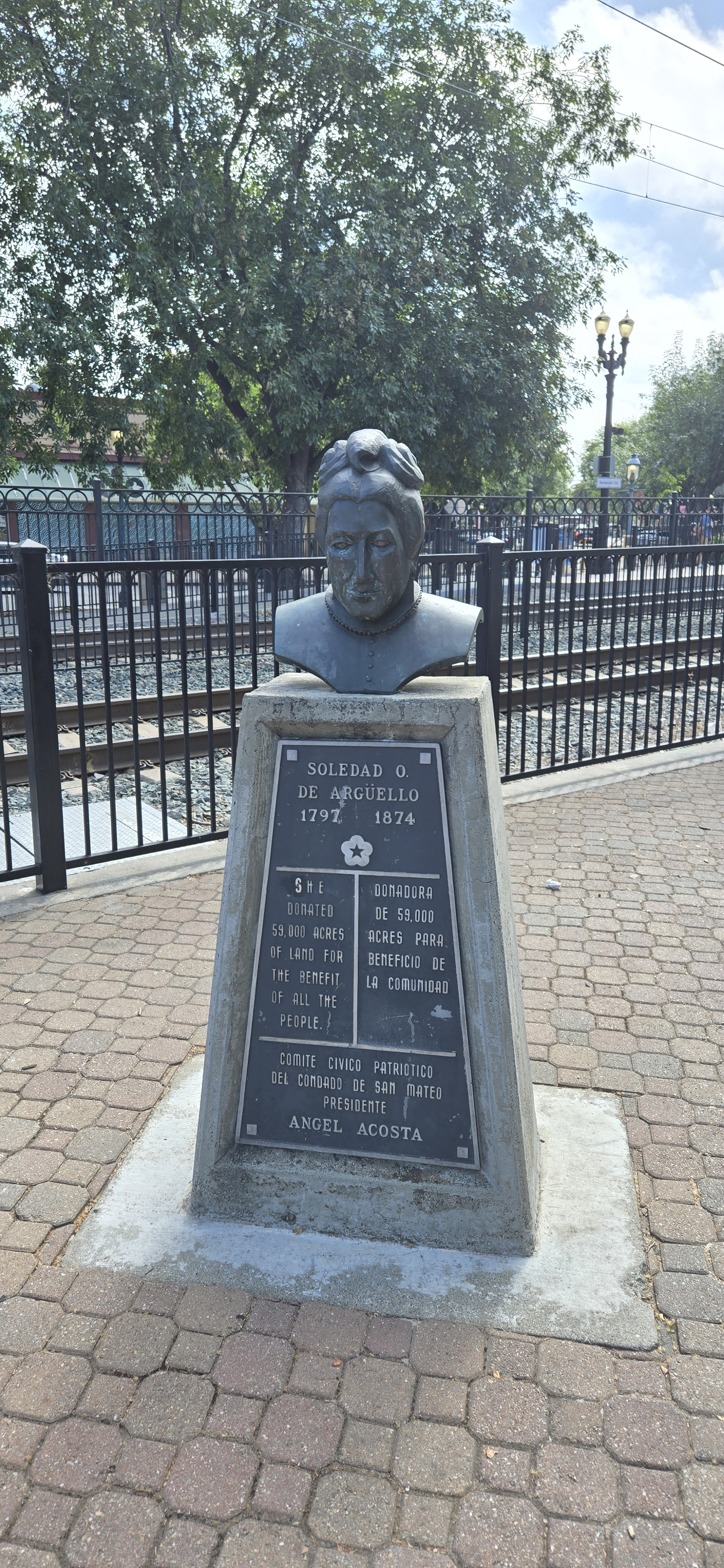
- Artist: Ray Lorenzata
- Year: 1976
- Medium: Bronze
- Subject: María Soledad Ortega de Argüello
- Location: Argüello Plaza, Redwood City, California; 37.486367°N 122.232483°W

The Bust of Soledad Ortega de Argüello is a bronze monument in Argüello Plaza, in Redwood City, California, honoring María Soledad Ortega de Argüello, a Californio ranchera whose vast Californian rancho, known as Rancho de las Pulgas, encompassed the present-day cities of San Mateo, Belmont, San Carlos, Redwood City, Atherton and Menlo Park.

== History ==
In 1976, the city government of Redwood City renamed a plaza at the intersection of Broadway and Argüello Street, near Redwood City station, as Argüello Plaza, as part of the United States Bicentennial celebrations. The Comite Cívico Patriótico del Condado de San Mateo (Spanish for "Patriotic Civic Committee of San Mateo County"), under the leadership of president Ángel Acosta, erected a bronze bust honoring Soledad Ortega de Argüello in that plaza, designed by sculptor Ray Lorenzata.

It was documented in the 1992 California Save Outdoor Sculpture survey.

== Inscription ==
The Spanish inscription on the monument reads:

SOLEDAD O.

DE ARGUËLLO
1797 1874

SHE DONADORA
DONATED DE 59,000
59,000 ACRES ACRES PARA
OF LAND FOR BENEFICIO DE
THE BENEFIT LA COMUNIDAD.
OF ALL THE
PEOPLE

COMITE CÍVICO PATRIÓTICO
DEL CONDADO DE SAN MATEO
PRESIDENTE
ÁNGEL ACOSTA
