= Rancho de las Pulgas =

Mexican land grant in California

Coordinates: 37.470°N 122.190°W

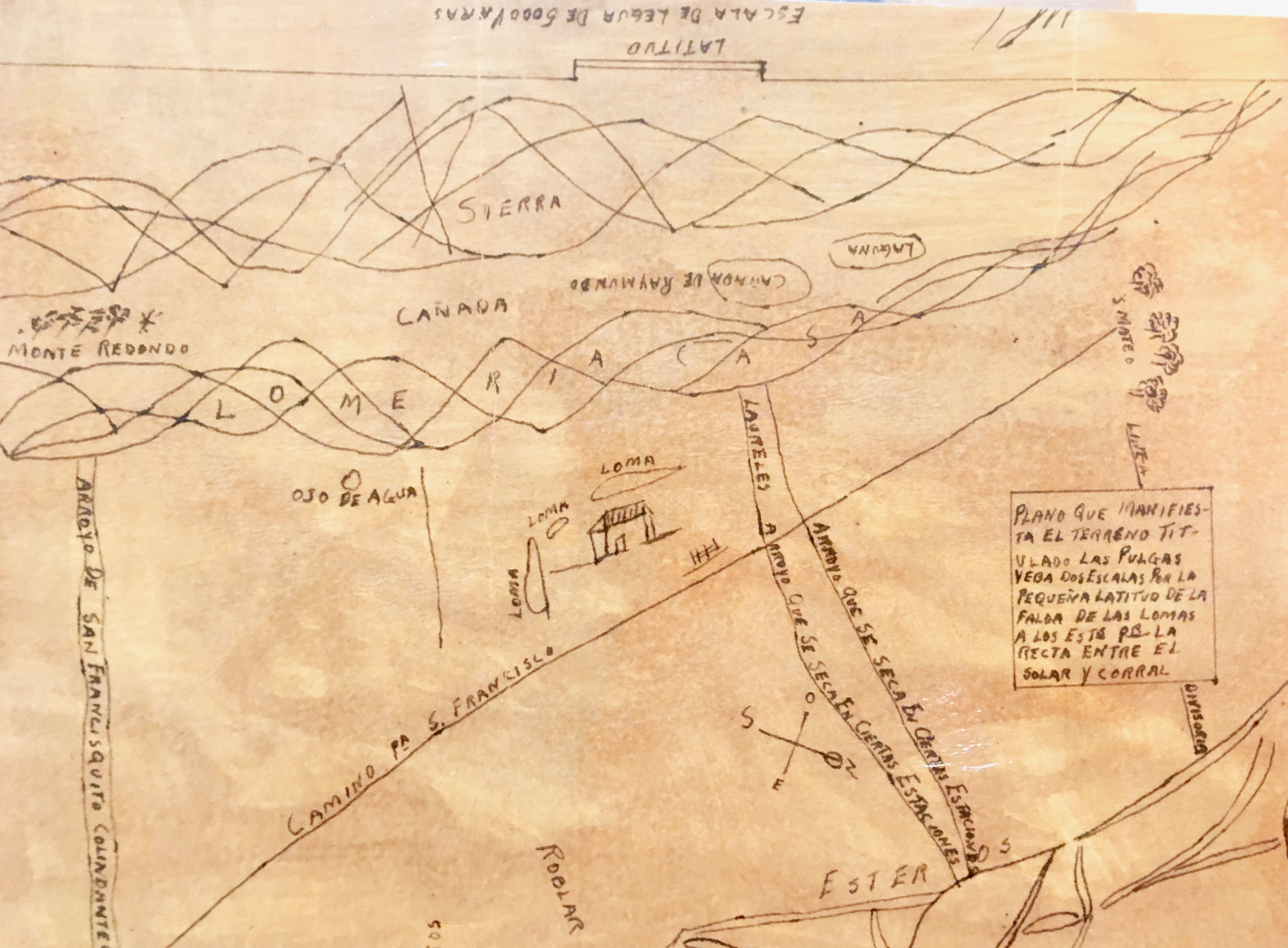
Diseños of land grant

Rancho de las Pulgas was a 35,240-acre (142.6 km^{2}) 1795 Spanish land grant in present-day San Mateo County, California, to José Darío Argüello. The literal translation is "Ranch of the Fleas," named after the exceptional abundance of fleas in the area. The grant extended about one league from San Francisco Bay to the hills, and was bounded by San Mateo Creek on the north (which separated it from Rancho San Mateo) and San Francisquito Creek on the south (which separated it from Rancho San Francisquito and Rancho Rincon de San Francisquito). The grant encompassed present-day San Mateo, Belmont, San Carlos, Redwood City, Atherton and Menlo Park. The southern boundary of the Rancho at San San Francisquito Creek would later define the eastern portion of the southern boundary of San Mateo County.

== History ==
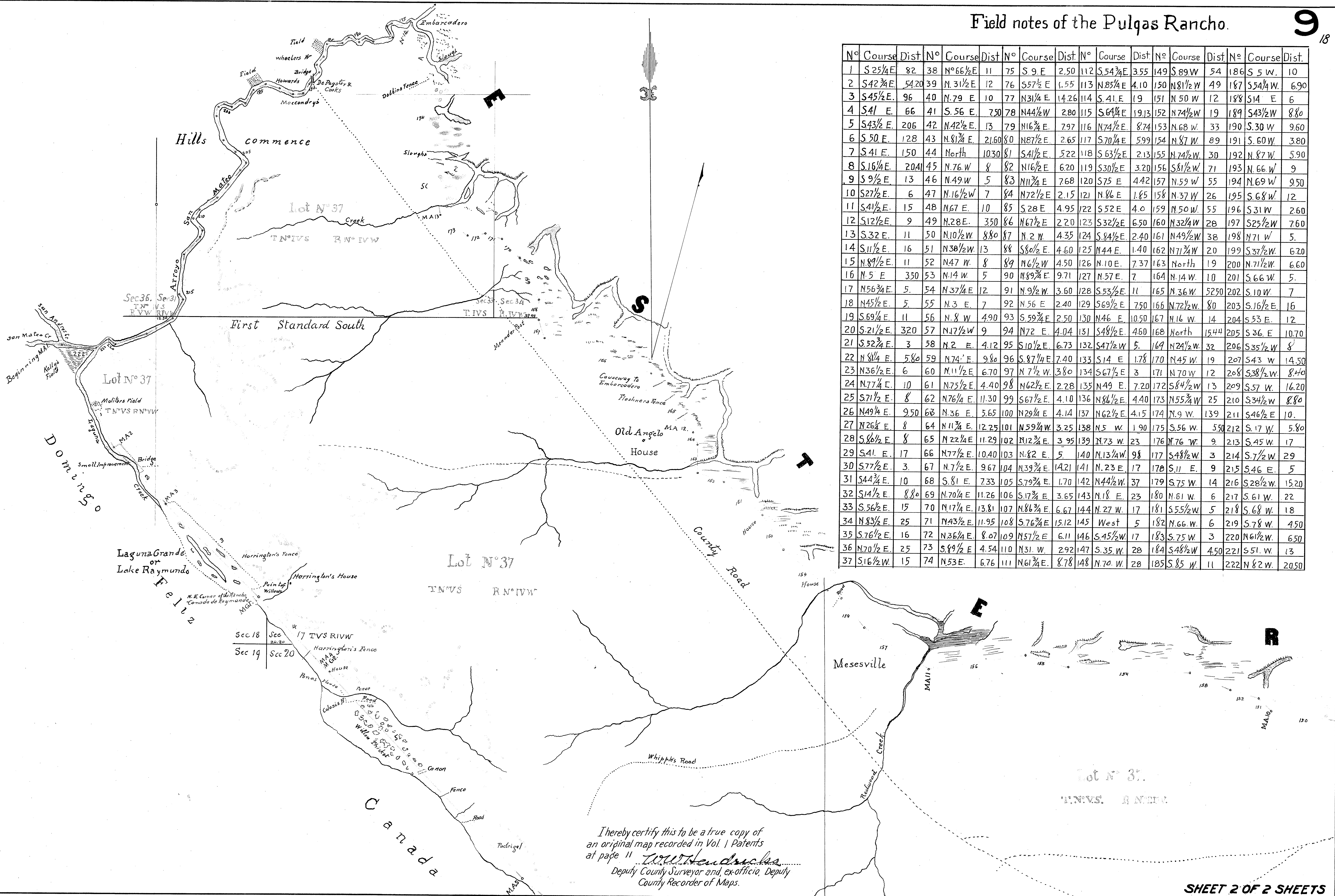
Northern portion of rancho plat of 1856

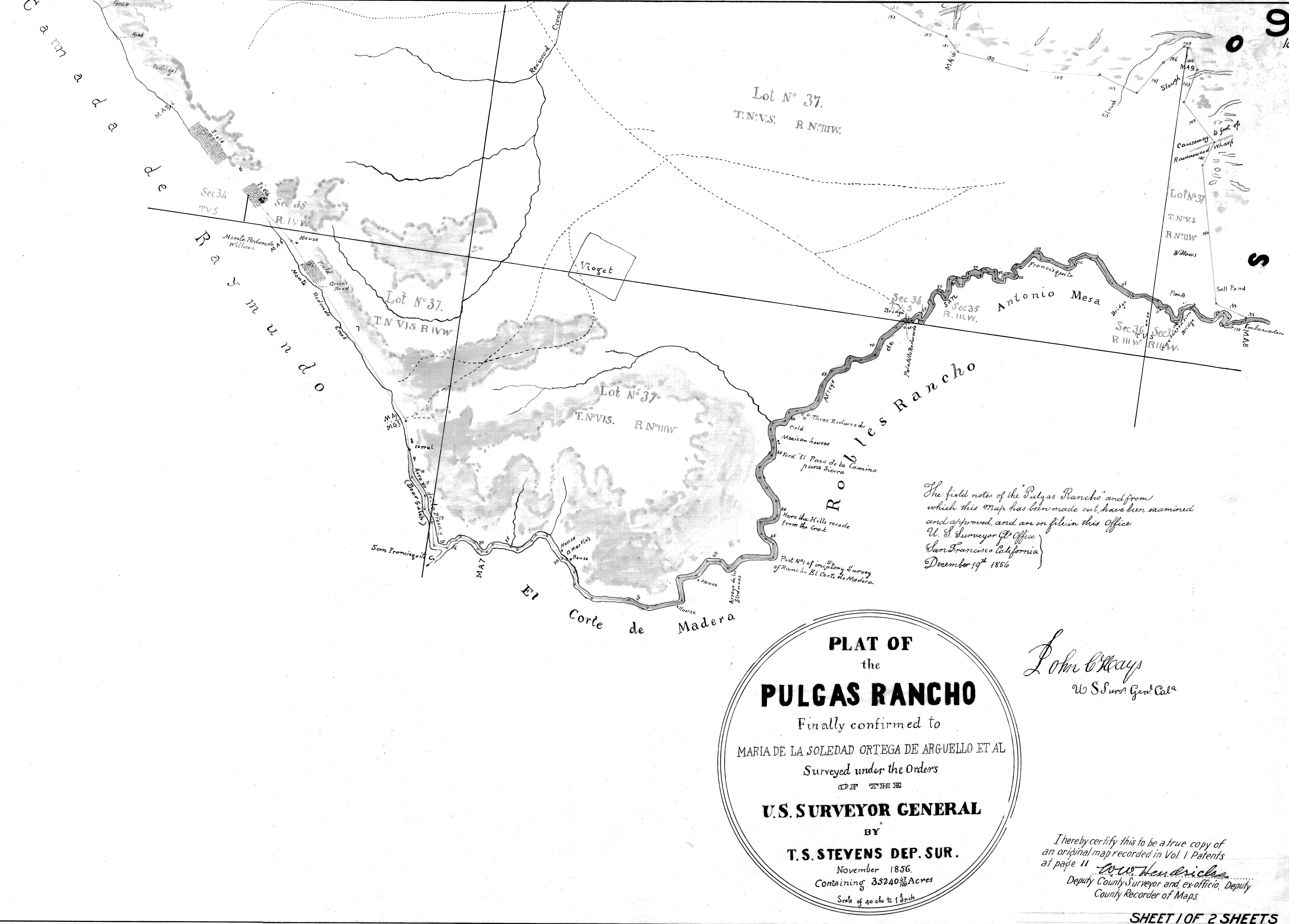
Southern portion of rancho plat of 1856

In 1795, the Spanish Governor of California, Diego de Borica, made the provisional grant of the Las Pulgas to José Darío Argüello. Brothers Luis Antonio Argüello (1784–1830), Santiago Argüello (1791–1862) and Gervasio Argüello were sons of José Darío Argüello (1753–1828). In 1835, Mexican Governor José Castro granted the four square league Rancho de las Pulgas to the widow, Maria Soledad Ortega de Argüello (1797–1874), and heirs of Luis Antonio Argüello.

With the cession of California to the United States following the Mexican–American War, the 1848 Treaty of Guadalupe Hidalgo provided that the land grants would be honored. As required by the Land Act of 1851, a claim for Rancho de las Pulgas for twelve square leagues was filed in 1852 with the Public Land Commission by heirs of Luis Antonio Argüello. The Land Commission rejected the claim for twelve square leagues, but confirmed the claim for four square leagues, which was confirmed by the District Court, and affirmed by the US Supreme Court. A claim filed by Gervasio Argüello with the Land Commission in 1852 was rejected. A claim filed by Mowry W. Smith with the Land Commission in 1853 was rejected.

In 1857, following the 1856 official survey, the grant was patented to Maria Soledad Ortega de Argüello (one undivided half), Jose Ramon Argüello (one undivided fourth), Luis Antonio Argüello (one undivided tenth) and S. M. Mezes (three undivided twentieths). Simon Monserrat Mezes (d. 1884) was the Argüello family's lawyer who handled the land patent process. The original grant was described as "being of the extent of four leagues in length and one league in breadth, more or less". The patent was for 35,240 acres (142.6 km^{2})—nearly double the size of the original grant, and contrary to the language of the US Supreme Court ruling. Although both Rancho de las Pulgas and Rancho Cañada de Raymundo had been patented by the US Government, the boundaries of these two grants now overlapped, a problem that required an Act of Congress in 1878 to resolve.

== Alameda de las Pulgas ==
Alameda de las Pulgas is a modern road almost 10 miles (16 km) long, which contiguously connects all the contemporary cities within the original grant, from San Mateo to Menlo Park. The area consists of suburban housing and a small business district along Alameda de las Pulgas, often just referred to as "the Alameda" (literally, "Avenue of the Fleas": in Spanish "alameda" means a row of trees or a street lined with trees and the word "pulgas" means fleas), which extends the length of the Rancho de las Pulgas land grant.

The main village of the Lamchin, the Ohlone tribe living in the San Carlos area before the Spanish settlers arrived, was called, "Cachanigtac." The name appears to contain a word for vermin, which the Spanish missionaries translated as las Pulgas (the Fleas).

- For the various branches of the Argüello last name in both the Western Hemisphere and in Spain see also Argüello

== See also ==
- Pulgas Water Temple
