= Juno and Avos (opera) =

Rock opera by Alexey Rybnikov and Andrei Voznesensky

Juno And Avos
- Original Record, 1980
- Music: Alexey Rybnikov
- Lyrics: Andrei Voznesensky
- Productions: 1979 Original Version

Juno and Avos (Russian: Юнона и Авось, Junona i Avos') is a popular Russian-language rock opera written by Alexey Rybnikov, poetry by Andrei Voznesensky. It was first performed in 1981 in the Lenkom Theatre, Moscow, directed by Mark Zakharov. Main roles in the premiere performed by Soviet stars Nikolai Karachentsov and Elena Shanina.

The opera is named after the two ships Juno and Avos that constituted the expedition headed by Russian explorer Nikolai Rezanov. The plot is based on the love story of Nikolai Rezanov and Concepción Argüello, a 15-year-old daughter of José Darío Argüello, the colonial governor of Spanish California.

The performance was first recorded for television in 1983, the second television version was created in 2002.

The opera's first premiere abroad took place at Espace Cardin theater in Paris in 1983.

== Original story ==
The libretto of Juno and Avos is based on Andrey Voznesensky's poem "Avos!" written in 1970. The poem is based on actual events of 1806 surrounding the love story of Nikolai Rezanov, a Russian nobleman, and Maria Concepción Argüello, the daughter of the Spanish governor of Alta California José Darío Argüello. Voznesensky was inspired by Rezanov's diary, George Alexander Lensen's books about the Rezanov expeditions, the Bret Harte ballad "Conception de Arguello" and Piotr Tikhmenev's "A History of the Russian-American Company".

In 1806 Nikolai Rezanov arrived in California, then a part of New Spain, to get provisioning for Russian settlements in Alaska. Maria fell in love with Rezanov and they got engaged. To marry Maria, a Catholic, Rezanov had to obtain the Emperor's permission. He also had to sail back to Alaska. On his way back to Saint Petersburg he fell ill and died in Krasnoyarsk in 1807 at the age of 43. A year later, Alexander Andreyevich Baranov told Maria the news, but she would not believe it until 1842 when Sir George Simpson gave her a detailed account of Rezanov's death. She took a vow of silence and lived in a monastery in Monterey, California until her death in 1857.

In the fall of 2000 the sheriff of Benicia, California, where Maria is buried, brought a handful of earth and a rose from her grave to Rezanov's grave in Krasnoyarsk. The cross on the grave is engraved with "I will never forget you" on one side and "I will never see you again" on the other, referencing a line from a popular track of the opera performed by a male and a female singer.

Voznesensky never claimed historical accuracy in his account, stating that characters in his poem are images echoing the fates of real people.

== Plot ==
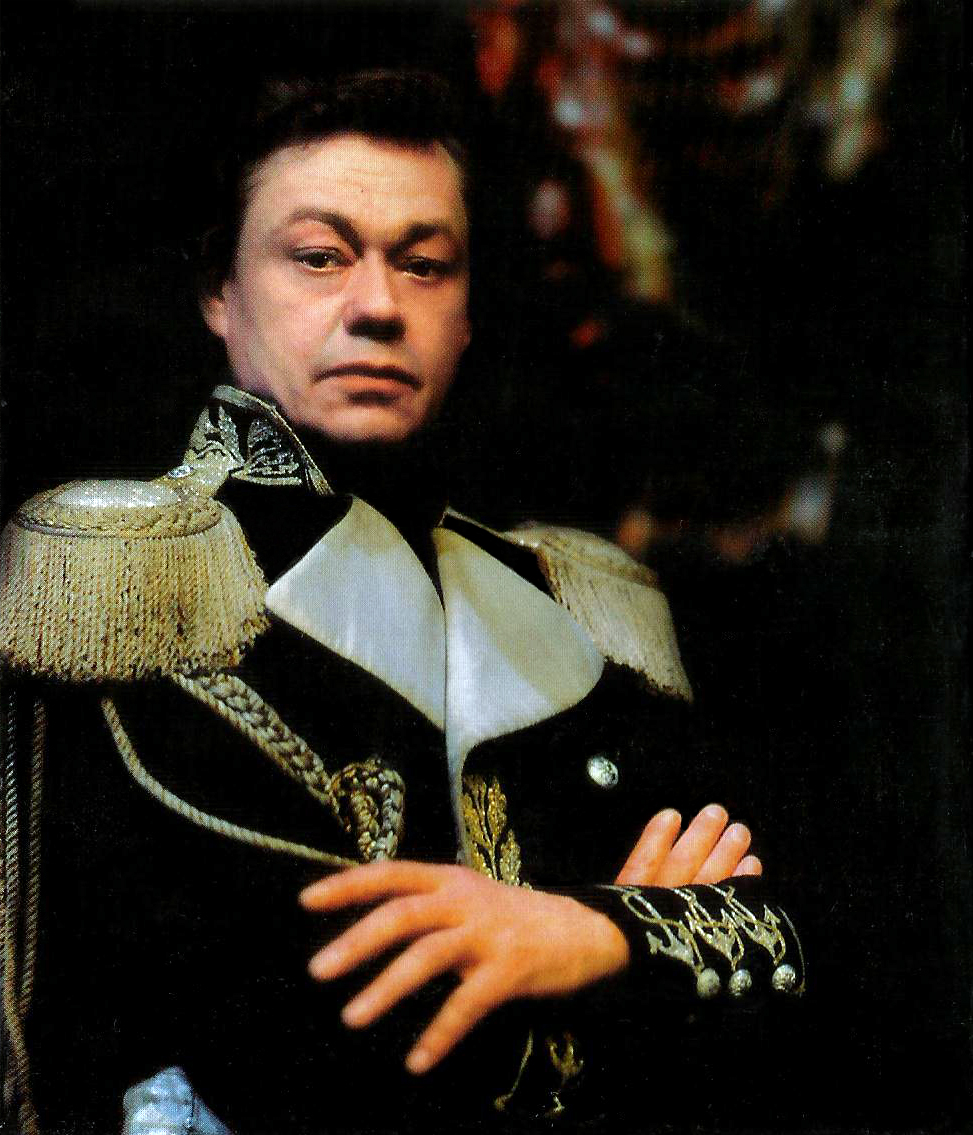
Nikolai Karachentsov as Rezanov in Juno and Avos stage portrait

After his wife's death, Court Chamberlain Rezanov decides to commit himself entirely to the service of Russia. His attempts to arrange trade with North America are not well received at government, but finally he is ordered to organize the expedition he desires. Before his departure, Rezanov tells a story that has been bothering him since his youth. Once he saw the icon of Our Lady of Kazan and since then he feels he is in love with Mary. Mary visits Rezanov in one of his dreams and tells him not to be afraid of his feelings, promising to pray for him.

Two ships, Juno and Avos, under Russian Navy Ensign are leaving for California. In then-Spanish California, the governor is preparing for the wedding of his daughter Conchita and Sir Fernando. Rezanov greets the Californians on behalf of Russia and the governor invites him, as the ambassador of Czar Alexander, to the 16th birthday ball for his daughter. Nikolai asks Conchita for a dance, which turns into a fateful event in the lives of the two and Fernando. Fernando is jealous, and guests cynically make bets on whether Rezanov will "pluck the California flower". Both men, Fernando and Rezanov, understand that neither one will give up without a fight. At night Conchita prays to Mary, and Nikolai comes to her room. The two fall in love and secretly become engaged.

But good fortune is no longer on Rezanov's side. Fernando calls for a duel. The Russian-American company business is in decline. The scandal prompts the Russians to leave San Francisco. On his way back to Saint Petersburg, Rezanov falls ill and dies in Krasnoyarsk. Conchita dies in a Dominican monastery.

== Credits ==
=== Original 1980 album version ===
- Gennady Trofimov – Nikolai Rezanov
- Anna Rybnikova – Conchita
- Peteris Tils – Federico
- Alexander Samoilov – Jose Dario Arguello
- Jeanne Rozhdestvenkaya – Our Lady's Voice
- Konstantin Kuzhaliev – Lieutenant Davydov

=== Original 1981 stage version cast ===
- Nikolai Karachentsov – Nikolai Rezanov
- Elena Shanina – Conchita
- Aleksandr Abdulov – Fernando Lopez, Conchita's suitor; theatre actor; the heretic
- Pavel Smeyan – the first narrator
- Gennady Trofimov – the second narrator
- Vladimir Shiryaev – Aleksey Rumyantsev; José Darío Argüello, governor of San-Francisco and Conchita's father
