= María Soledad Ortega de Argüello =

Californio ranchera (1797–1874)

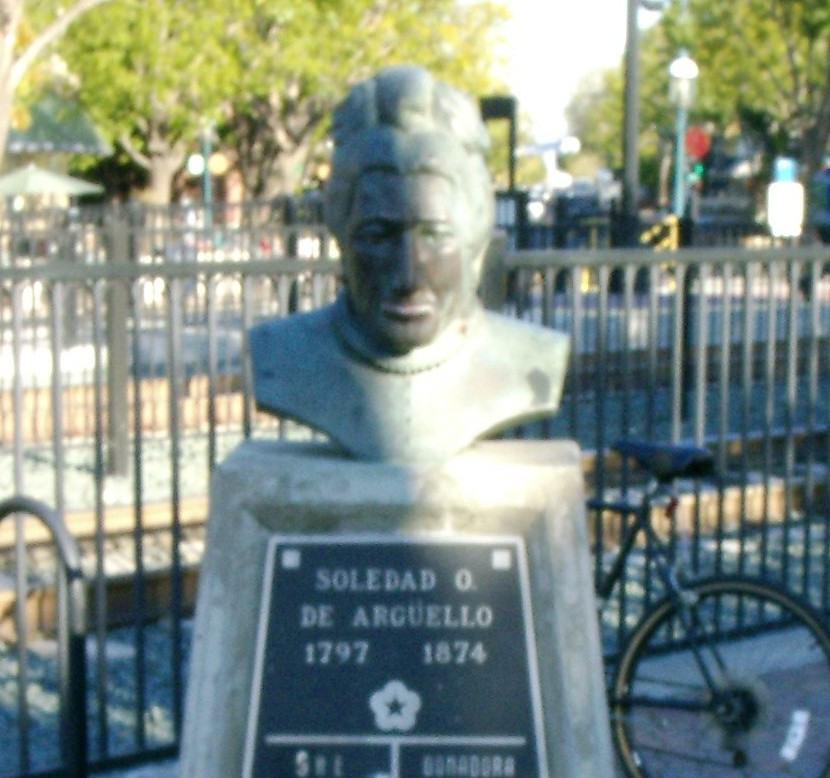
- Bust of Soledad Ortega de Argüello in Redwood City
- Born: 1797; Santa Barbara, California
- Died: 1874 (aged 76–77); Santa Clara, California
- Occupation: Ranchera
- Spouse: Luis Antonio Argüello

Doña María Soledad Ortega de Argüello (1797–1874) was a Californio ranchera and socialite. She inherited the vast Rancho de las Pulgas, which encompassed most of the southern half of the San Francisco Peninsula, stretching from San Mateo to Menlo Park.

== Life ==
Granddaughter of Sergeant José Francisco Ortega of the Portolá expedition - reportedly the first European to see the San Francisco Bay, she was one of 13 children. At the age of 25, she married Luis Antonio Argüello, son of José Darío Argüello, in 1822 and moved to the San Francisco Presidio soon thereafter. In November of the same year they move to Monterey, while he was governor, then back to the Presidio until Luis' death in 1830. From then on she ran and took charge of Rancho de las Pulgas.

In 1852, she filed a claim for the land following the rules as set by the United States administration to meet the Treaty of Guadalupe Hidalgo. Her claim prevailed and was patented by the United States Supreme Court. Instead of the 4 square leagues, as originally granted and court decision, she received 8 (eight) square leagues(35,240 acres (142.6 km^{2})) by the official survey. She eventually sold any remaining unsold land to the County of San Mateo. In 1859, she moved to Santa Clara County to live with her son where he had purchased a part of Rancho Quito. She remained there until her death.

In 1976, the City of Redwood City renamed a downtown plaza at the intersection of Broadway and Arguello Street as Argüello Plaza. The Bust of Soledad Ortega de Argüello was erected in September of the same year in that plaza. The bust is on the edge of the train and bus depot, next to the Broadway train crossing.
