= North Fair Oaks Festival =

The North Fair Oaks Festival (or North Fair Oaks Community Festival) is a free, annual, one-day food and arts festival, held every summer in the community of North Fair Oaks, in the San Mateo County, California. The summer event features live music and talent performances, a parade, food and craft stands, informational booths, the Queen of the Festival scholarship awardee presentation, and a raffle event. The event has two stages on alternate ends of the festival grounds, with each presenting live music or talent performances during the course of the Festival.

== Features ==
The North Fair Oaks Festival is hosted by the Sheriff’s Office of San Mateo County, currently led by Sheriff Greg Munks, and brings together community members, business, and law enforcement for a day of celebration.

In addition to the Festival, there is also the Queen of the Festival Scholarship program, which rewards young women in the community who stand out in school, have a proven history of community involvement, and who are college bound. The contenders for the crown sell raffle tickets for a drawing that occurs during the festival where travel packages, electronics, and other gifts are awarded to the raffle winners. Each year the amount of scholarships awarded continues to grow. The total amount awarded from 2007 - 2011 was $54,000. In the most recent year, 2012, $22,000 in scholarships was awarded.

Proceeds from the raffle as well as other fundraising efforts support the Queen of the Festival scholarship awards as well as the Sheriff’s Office youth programs: S.A.L, C.A.R.O.N, the Explorer Program, S.T.A.R. Camp, and D.A.R.E.

== History ==
The first North Fair Oaks Festival took place in 2000 and attracted about 1,500 visitors. The following year, more than 10,000 people came out for the event. Each year the Festival continued to grow and to date, the Festival draws approximately 40,000 attendees. 2020 saw no festival due to the COVID-19 virus.
