= North Fair Oaks, California =

North Fair Oaks
- census-designated place
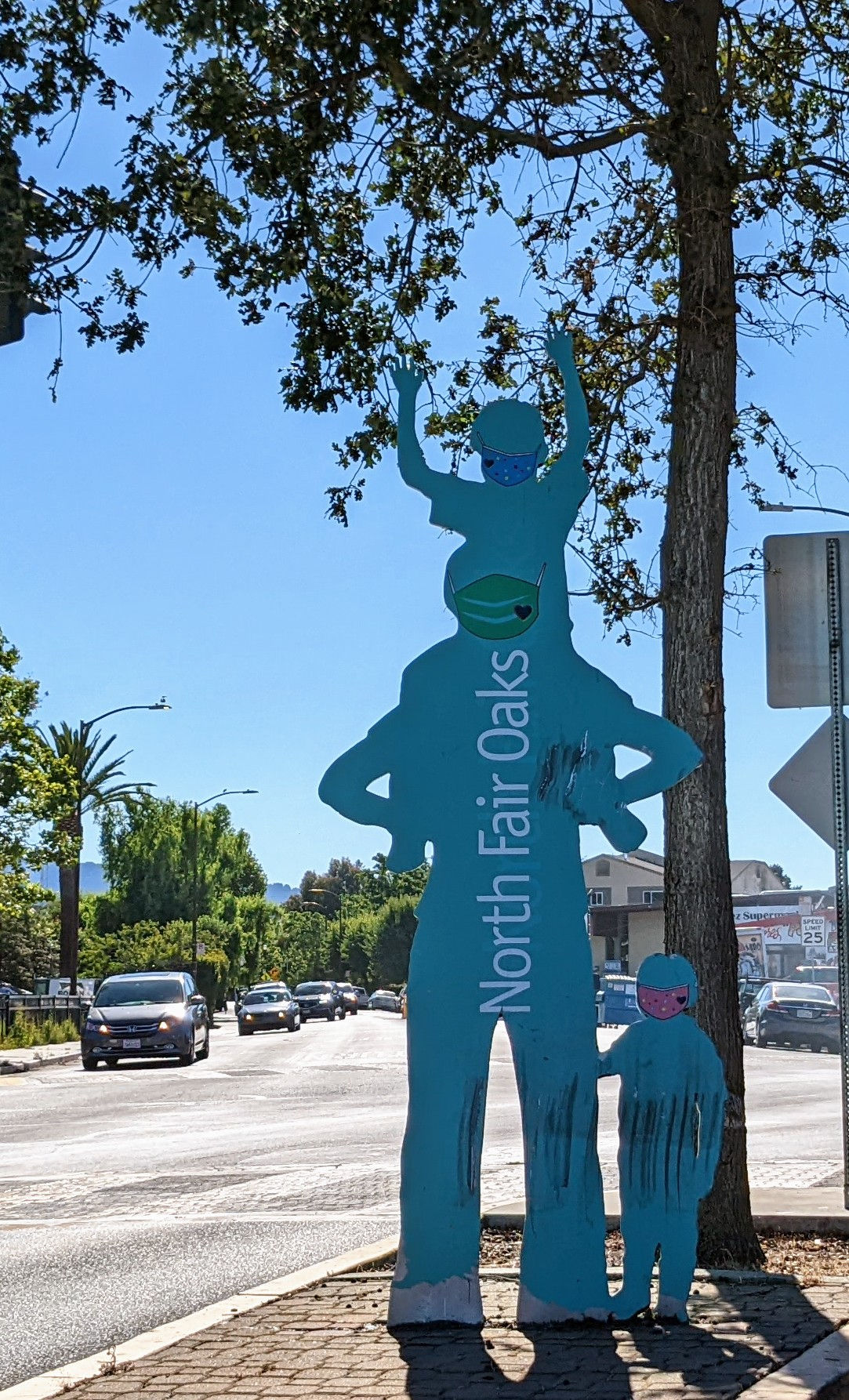
- An entry sign welcoming people to North Fair Oaks.
- Interactive map of North Fair Oaks
- Location in California Location in the United States
- Coordinates: 37°28′31″N 122°12′13″W
- Country: United States
- State: California
- County: San Mateo

Area
  - Total: 1.196 sq mi (3.098 km^{2})
  - Land: 1.196 sq mi (3.098 km^{2})
  - Water: 0 sq mi (0 km^{2}) 0%
- Elevation: 26 ft (8 m)

Population (2020)
  - Total: 14,027
  - Density: 11,730/sq mi (4,528/km^{2})
- Time zone: UTC-8 (PST)
  - Summer (DST): UTC-7 (PDT)
- ZIP code: 94025
- Area code: 650
- FIPS code: 06-51840
- GNIS feature ID: 1786241

North Fair Oaks is a census-designated place and an unincorporated area located in San Mateo County, California, United States, adjacent to Redwood City, Atherton, and Menlo Park. As of the 2020 census the area had a total population of 14,027. Because of the large number of residents from one Mexican state the area is also known as Little Michoacán. The larger area including North Fair Oaks and adjacent parts of Redwood City has a large Hispanic/Latino population and is known locally as Little Mexico. The neighborhood is distinctive, as it is one out of only three communities (the others being East Palo Alto and Pescadero) in San Mateo County that have a majority-Hispanic/Latino population.

== History ==
Fair Oaks was a residential area north of Menlo Park. In 1923, Menlo Park attempted to incorporate Fair Oaks first, but instead, Fair Oaks incorporated itself separately as the town of Atherton (see Atherton for details and history). This left North Fair Oaks unincorporated.

One of the two Hetch Hetchy Aqueduct utility corridors on the San Francisco Peninsula was installed through the area at an angle diagonal to the existing street grid.

== Geography and climate ==
North Fair Oaks is located at 37°28′31″N 122°12′13″W (37.475170, -122.203506).

According to the United States Census Bureau, the area has a total area of 1.2 square miles (3.1 km^{2}), all land.

Proximity to mountains by the Pacific coast and the San Francisco Bay creates a microclimate that makes the area sunny and warm with temperatures moderated by ocean and bay breezes most of the time. Similar conditions are also found on the Canary Islands and the Mediterranean coast of North Africa. This local microclimate is centered on nearby Redwood City which claims the slogan "climate best by government test".

== Law and government ==
Essential services are provided through San Mateo County by the Board of Supervisors using input from the North Fair Oaks Community Council. They also are included within the boundaries of the Sequoia Healthcare District, which provides health care benefits supported by property taxes collected from District residents.

Children attend elementary school in the Redwood City School District, but then attend Menlo-Atherton High School within the Sequoia Union High School District.

== Demographics ==
=== 2020 census ===
As of the 2020 census, North Fair Oaks had a population of 14,027. The population density was 11,728.3 inhabitants per square mile (4,528.3/km^{2}). There were 7,238 males (51.6%) and 6,789 females (48.4%).

The median age was 35.3 years. 10,668 people (76.1%) were age 18 or older, while 3,359 (23.9%) were under age 18. 1,470 people (10.5%) were age 65 or older. For every 100 females, there were 106.6 males, and for every 100 females age 18 and over there were 107.1 males age 18 and over.

100.0% of residents lived in urban areas, while 0.0% lived in rural areas. 215 people (1.5%) lived in group quarters, all noninstitutionalized.

There were 4,061 households in North Fair Oaks, of which 42.7% had children under the age of 18 living in them. Of all households, 48.8% were married-couple households, 19.2% were households with a male householder and no spouse or partner present, and 24.2% were households with a female householder and no spouse or partner present. About 18.3% of all households were made up of individuals and 6.4% had someone living alone who was 65 years of age or older.

There were 4,228 housing units, of which 4,061 were occupied and 167 were vacant (3.9%). Among occupied units, 1,832 (45.1%) were owner-occupied and 2,229 (54.9%) were renter-occupied. The homeowner vacancy rate was 1.2% and the rental vacancy rate was 2.7%.

Racial composition as of the 2020 census
Race	Number	Percent
White	3,486	24.9%
Black or African American	173	1.2%
American Indian and Alaska Native	286	2.0%
Asian	853	6.1%
Native Hawaiian and Other Pacific Islander	157	1.1%
Some other race	5,861	41.8%
Two or more races	3,211	22.9%
Hispanic or Latino (of any race)	9,799	69.9%

Among residents who were not Hispanic or Latino, 2,681 were White, 153 were Black or African American, 23 were American Indian and Alaska Native, 828 were Asian, 152 were Native Hawaiian and other Pacific Islander, 58 were of some other race, and 333 were of two or more races. Among Hispanic or Latino residents, 805 identified as White, 20 as Black or African American, 263 as American Indian and Alaska Native, 25 as Asian, 5 as Native Hawaiian and other Pacific Islander, 5,803 as some other race, and 2,878 as two or more races. The largest mixed-race groups were White and some other race (2,589, 18.5%) and White and Asian (151, 1.1%).

=== 2010 census ===
The 2010 United States census reported that North Fair Oaks had a population of 14,687. The population density was 12,236.5 inhabitants per square mile (4,724.5/km^{2}). The racial makeup of North Fair Oaks was 7,060 (48.1%) Whites, 235 (1.6%) African Americans, 143 (1.0%) Native Americans, 548 (3.7%) Asians, 219 (1.5%) Pacific Islanders, 5,728 (39.0%) from other races, and 754 (5.1%) from two or more races. Hispanics or Latinos of any race were 10,731 people (73.1%).

The Census reported that 14,367 people (97.8% of the population) lived in households, 314 (2.1%) lived in non-institutionalized group quarters, and 6 (0%) were institutionalized.

There were 3,919 households, out of which 1,928 (49.2%) had children under the age of 18 living in them, 2,033 (51.9%) were opposite-sex married couples living together, 548 (14.0%) had a female householder with no husband present, 350 (8.9%) had a male householder with no wife present. There were 324 (8.3%) unmarried opposite-sex partnerships, and 45 (1.1%) same-sex married couples or partnerships. 629 households (16.1%) were made up of individuals, and 175 (4.5%) had someone living alone who was 65 years of age or older. The average household size was 3.67. There were 2,931 families (74.8% of all households); the average family size was 3.93.

The population was spread out, with 4,075 people (27.7%) under the age of 18, 1,557 people (10.6%) aged 18 to 24, 4,990 people (34.0%) aged 25 to 44, 3,097 people (21.1%) aged 45 to 64, and 968 people (6.6%) who were 65 years of age or older. The median age was 31.0 years. For every 100 females, there were 113.0 males. For every 100 females age 18 and over, there were 115.0 males.

There were 4,107 housing units at an average density of 3,421.7 per square mile (1,321.1/km^{2}), of which 1,838 (46.9%) were owner-occupied, and 2,081 (53.1%) were occupied by renters. The homeowner vacancy rate was 1.0%; the rental vacancy rate was 5.1%. 5,997 people (40.8% of the population) lived in owner-occupied housing units and 8,370 people (57.0%) lived in rental housing units.

== Politics ==
In the California State Legislature, North Fair Oaks is in the 13th senatorial district, represented by Democrat Josh Becker, and in the 21st Assembly district, represented by Democrat Diane Papan.

In the United States House of Representatives, North Fair Oaks is in California's 15th congressional district, represented by Democrat Kevin Mullin.

The community is mostly Democratic, with 58% registered Democrats and 19% registered Republicans as of 02/2002.

== Community ==
The Fair Oaks Beautification Association is an active element of the North Fair Oaks community. FOBA is a not-for-profit 501c3 organization that has raised funds to plant trees and install traffic-calming devices throughout the neighborhood. Its primary activity is to maintain the neighborhood park at Edison Way and Fair Oaks Avenue. This park is built over the Hetch Hetchy Aqueduct and was installed with permission of the SFPUC. Construction and maintenance are made possible by grants and community contributions, with substantial volunteer effort provided by members of the community.

The North Fair Oaks Festival is a very popular annual summer event.
