= Concepción Argüello =

Californio socialite (1791–1857)

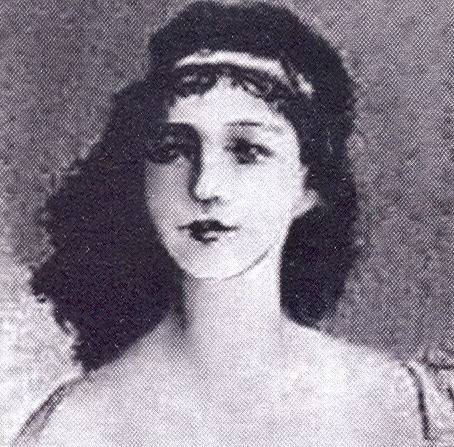
María de la Concepción Marcela Argüello y Moraga (1791–1857)

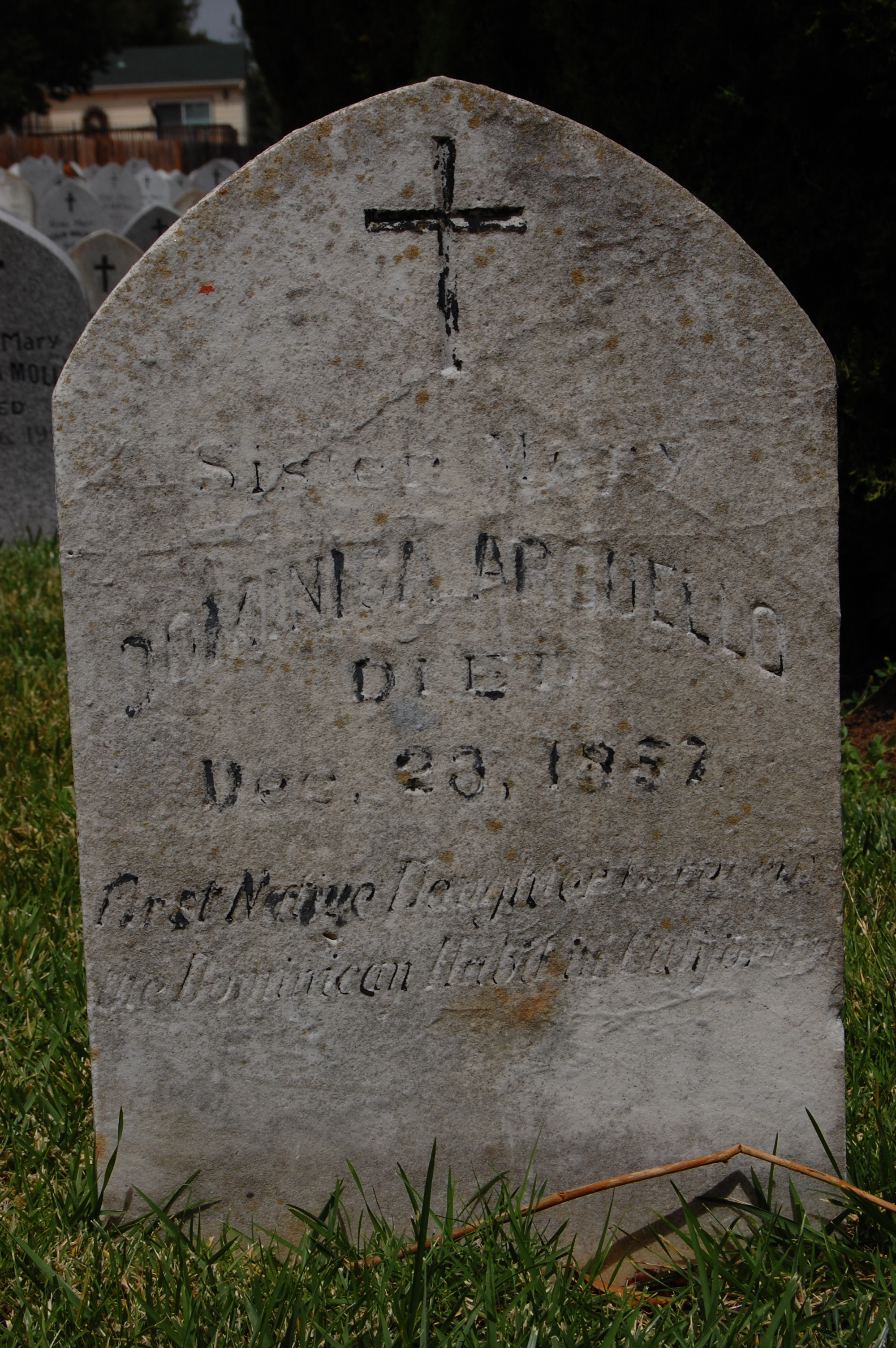
Grave of Concepción Argüello

María de la Concepción Marcela Argüello y Moraga, commonly referred to simply as Concepción Argüello, or "Conchita", (February 19, 1791 – December 23, 1857) was a Californio socialite noted for her romance with Nikolai Rezanov, a Russian promoter of the colonization of Alaska and California.

== Biography ==
She was the daughter of José Darío Argüello, the Spanish governor of Alta California and Presidio Commandante. She was born at the Presidio of San Francisco and at 15 she was engaged to Nikolai Rezanov, the visiting head of a Russian expedition to Alaska. His expedition had hard times in California and his involvement with Argüello was at first motivated by practical considerations, since the Spanish Crown did not permit giving aid to Russians. Rezanov returned to Russia supposedly to ask the Tsar for permission to marry Argüello. During his return trip across Siberia in 1807, he fell from his horse, became sick and died in Krasnoyarsk, where he is buried.

According to a traditional account, Argüello never learned his fate and continued to wait for him nearly till the end of her life, rejecting all other men. Late in her life, she became a Dominican nun at Santa Catalina Monastery and Academy which was founded in Monterey in 1851, where she was given the religious name of Sister Mary Dominica, O.P. She thereby became the first native Californian to enter the Dominican Order. The community she entered, which later became the Dominican Sisters of San Rafael, soon moved to Benicia. She remained a member of the community until her death there in 1857.

According to another source, Argüello was waiting for the pope's permission to marry Rezanov, as he was a member of the Russian Orthodox Church and not a Roman Catholic. She learned of Rezanov's death a year later in 1808, when the head of the Russian American Company, Alexander Baranov, wrote to her brother. Although freed from her engagement, she chose to stay single and later became a nun.

Argüello died in 1857 and is now buried in St. Dominic's Cemetery, Benicia, where her remains were moved from the cemetery of St. Catherine Convent in 1894, when it closed. A monument marks her grave.

== In culture ==
- Francis Bret Harte wrote a ballad describing her fate, in which Rezanov is referred to as Count von Resanoff, the Russian, envoy of the mighty Czar.
- Novel Concha: My Dancing Saint by Rebecca Lawrence Lee.
- Soviet rock opera Juno and Avos describes Concepción Argüello's love story.
- Concepción Argüello is a character Christopher Moore's novel Secondhand Souls.
- For the various branches of the last name in both the Western Hemisphere and in Spain, see also Argüello.
- Viva Concha!, a chamber musical based on Concepción Arguello's story and written by Candace Forest, premiered at the Victoria Theater in San Francisco in 2006 -a new adaptation is in the works.

== Bibliography ==
- Istomin, Alexei; Gibson, James R.; Tishkov, Valery (2005). Россия в Калифорнии: русские документы о колонии Росс и российско-калифорнийских связях 1803-1850 : в двух томах. Vol. 1. Nauka. p. 752. ISBN 978-5-02-008901-3.
- Gibson, James R. (2010), Russian America: Company Sources on a Company Colony (PDF), International Conference on Russian America, archived from the original (PDF) on 2012-03-20
- "Records Of The Russian-American Company, 1802-1867". Atlanta: National Archives. Microfilm Number M-11.
