= Redwood City, California =

City in California, United States

- City
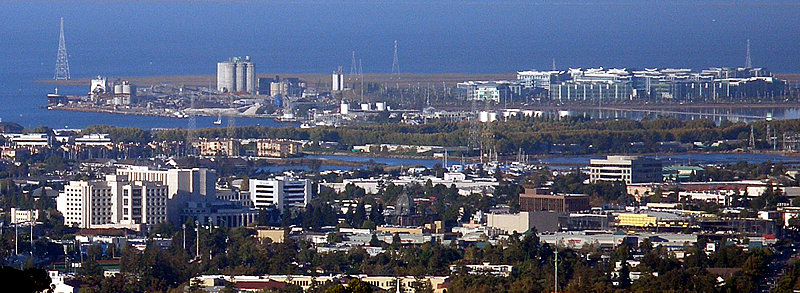
- The skyline of downtown Redwood City

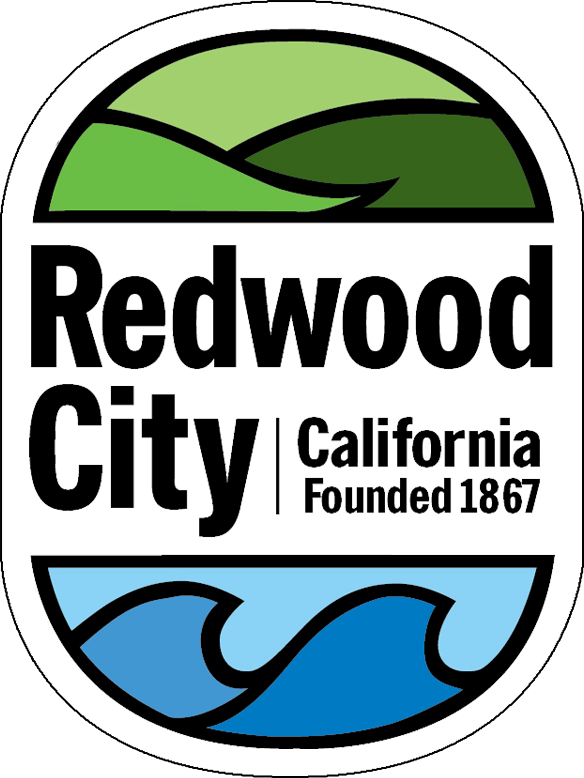
- Motto: Climate Best By Government Test
- Interactive map of Redwood City, California
- Location in San Francisco Bay Area Location in California Location in the United States
- Coordinates: 37°28′58″N 122°14′10″W
- Country: United States
- State: California
- County: San Mateo
- Incorporated: May 11, 1867; 159 years ago
- Re-incorporated: May 3, 1897; 129 years ago

Government
  - Mayor: Elmer Martínez Saballos

Area
  - Total: 34.74 sq mi (90.0 km^{2})
  - Land: 19.34 sq mi (50.1 km^{2})
  - Water: 15.41 sq mi (39.9 km^{2}) 44.34%
- Elevation: 20 ft (6 m)

Population (2020)
  - Total: 84,292
  - Rank: 98th in California; 446th in the U.S.
  - Density: 4,358.43/sq mi (1,682.80/km^{2})
- Time zone: UTC-8 (Pacific)
  - Summer (DST): UTC-7 (PDT)
- ZIP codes: 94059, 94061–94065
- Area code: 650
- FIPS code: 06-60102
- GNIS feature IDs: 277584, 2410919
- Website: www.redwoodcity.org

Redwood City is a city in San Mateo County, California, United States, on the San Francisco Peninsula in the Bay Area of Northern California, approximately 27 miles (43 km) south of San Francisco and 24 miles (39 km) northwest of San Jose. The city's population was 84,292 according to the 2020 census. The Port of Redwood City is the only deepwater port on San Francisco Bay south of San Francisco.

Redwood City's history spans its earliest inhabitation by the Ohlone people to being a port for lumber and other goods. The county seat of San Mateo County in the heart of Silicon Valley, Redwood City is home to several global technology companies including Oracle, Electronic Arts, Evernote, Box, and Informatica.

According to the United States Census Bureau, the city has an area of 34.7 square miles (90 km^{2}), of which 19.4 square miles (50 km^{2}) is land and 15.2 square miles (39 km^{2}), comprising 44.34%, is water. One major watercourse draining much of Redwood City is Redwood Creek, to which several significant river deltas connect, the largest of which is Westpoint Slough.

== History ==
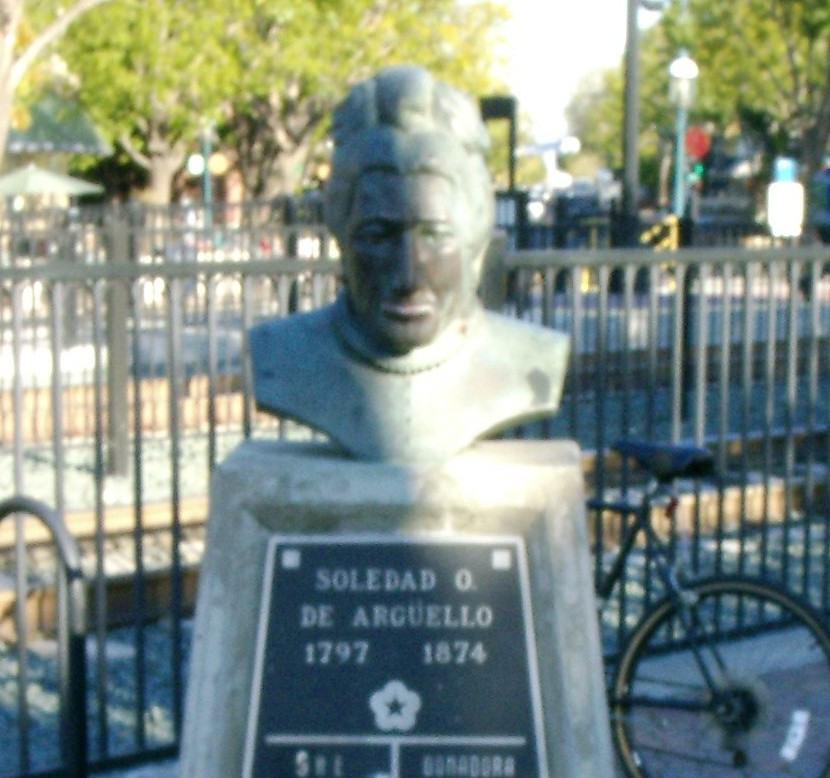
The area of Redwood City was part of Rancho de las Pulgas, granted to Californio politician José Darío Argüello in 1795. Las Pulgas was eventually inherited by María Soledad Ortega de Argüello, who is honored with the Bust of Soledad Ortega de Argüello.

The earliest known inhabitants of the area that would become Redwood City were the Ohlone, who were present when the Spanish claimed the land and established missions.

Redwood City incorporated in 1867, being the first city in San Mateo County to do so; it has remained the county seat since the county's formation in 1856. The land had been part of the Rancho de las Pulgas granted to the Argüello family in 1835 by the Mexican government. Their control was challenged after the Mexican–American War when California became part of the United States. The family lawyer, Simon M. Mezes, in 1854 defended the claim somewhat successfully and was allowed to buy the part of the estate that is now Redwood City. Mezes sold some of the land to people already squatting on it along the banks of Redwood Creek and named the settlement "Mezesville". Though the city did not keep that name, Mezes Park still exists on land that Mezes had given for open space.

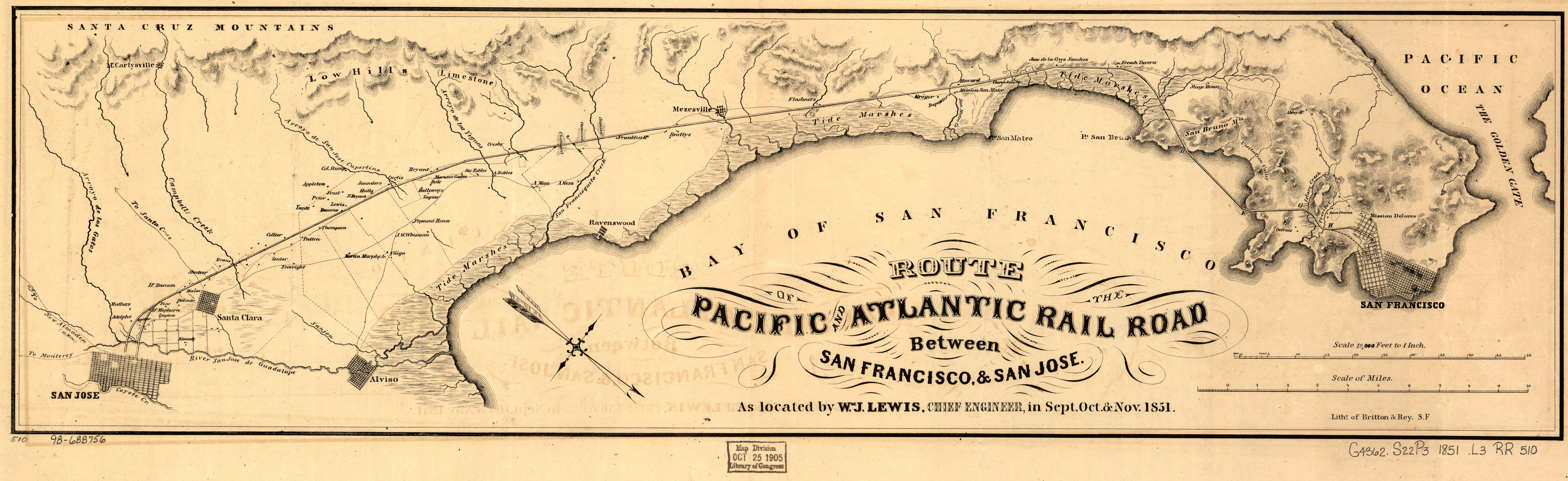
1851 map of a planned railroad between San Francisco and San Jose. Note Mezesville, an earlier name for Redwood City, about midway.

In 1907, Eikichi and Sadakusi Enomoto, Japanese immigrant brothers, grew what may perhaps have been the first commercially grown chrysanthemums in the United States in Redwood City. In 1926, the chamber of commerce proclaimed the city the "Chrysanthemum Center of the World" though the internment of Japanese Americans in 1941 and other factors would contribute to the end of flower growing as a major industry in the city.

== Geography ==
Redwood City stretches from the San Francisco Bay towards the Santa Cruz Mountains between San Carlos to the northwest and Atherton to the southeast with Woodside to the southwest. It is divided by Highway 101 and further inland El Camino Real on the northwest–southeast axis and Woodside Road on the north-northeast/south-southwest axis. Locally, the former two are regarded as north–south and the latter east/west, as 101 and El Camino connects Redwood City to San Francisco and San Jose and Woodside Road runs from San Francisco Bay to the Santa Cruz Mountains.

Neighborhoods include Bair Island to the northeast of Highway 101. The northern planned community of Redwood Shores, also to the northeast of Highway 101, is part of Redwood City, although it is not possible to travel by road from one to the other without passing through the neighboring city of San Carlos, or through Belmont via San Mateo County. Stretching along Highway 101 to the southeast of Woodside Road is Friendly Acres, further inland and still to the southeast of Woodside Road are Redwood Village and then Redwood Oaks. Most neighborhoods are to the northwest of Woodside Road and southwest of Highway 101. Centennial, Downtown, and Stambaugh Heller are adjacent to 101. Next inland are Edgewood, Mt. Carmel, Central and Palm then Canyon, Eagle Hill, Roosevelt, and Woodside Plaza. Furthest inland is Farm Hills (or Farm Hill).

Neighborhoods associated with Redwood City but not part of the incorporated city include Emerald Lake Hills and Kensington Square inland and to the north and North Fair Oaks to the southeast. Palomar Park, just north of Emerald Hills and east of San Carlos' Crestview area, is another Redwood City neighborhood that is formally part of unincorporated San Mateo County. Although Redwood City has a large middle class, the southeastern section of Redwood City strongly resembles working-class North Fair Oaks in both demographic makeup and income level.

=== Downtown ===
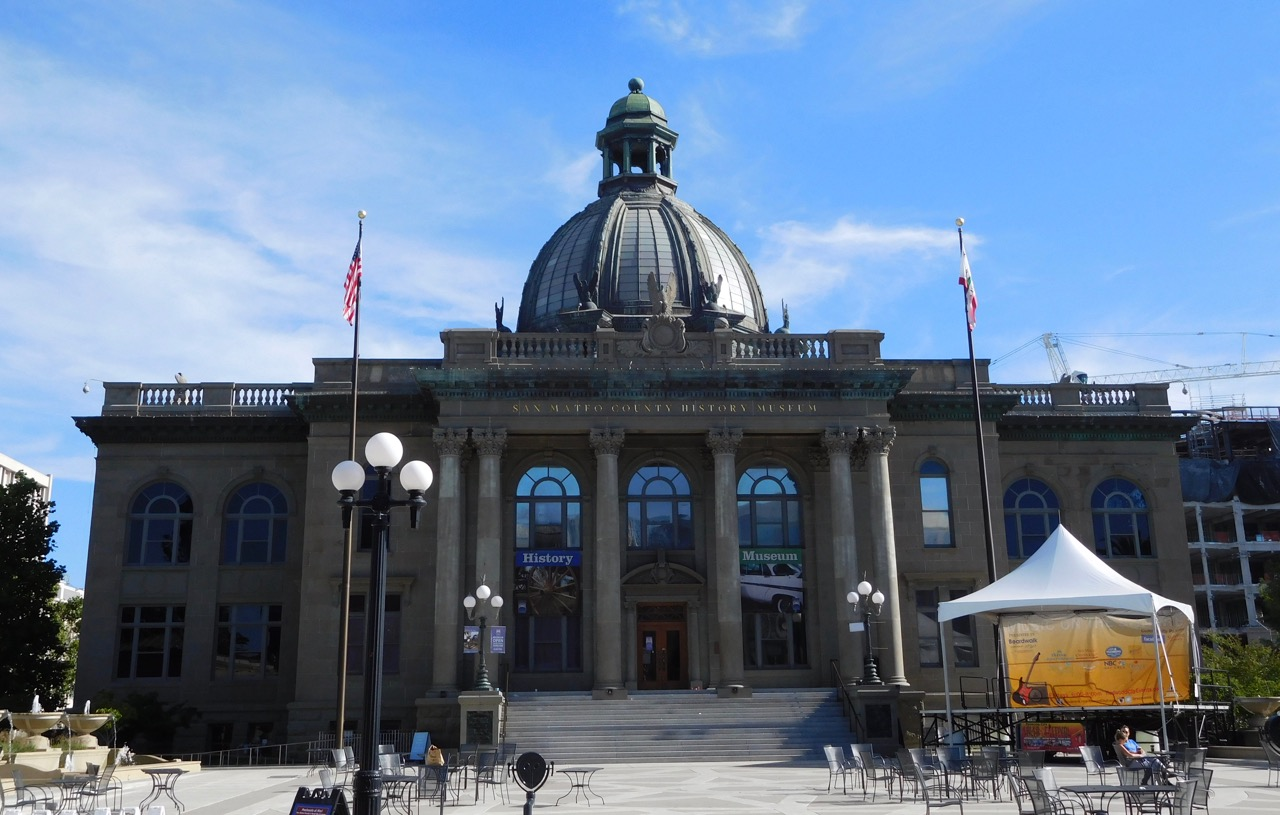
The San Mateo County History Museum, formerly the San Mateo County Courthouse, was originally built in 1910.

In an attempt to revitalize Redwood City's downtown, city officials decided to consider development. In February 1999, the San Mateo County History Museum opened inside the old San Mateo County Courthouse in downtown Redwood City. The courthouse had been built in 1910 and in the late '30s an addition was built in front of the original structure, obscuring the view. As part of the revitalization, this addition was torn down and replaced with a large courtyard flanked by water fountains on either side, leading to the main steps of the courthouse. The courthouse's glass dome is lit at night and changes colors every 11 seconds.

In August 2006, a 20-screen theater and various shops opened in a prime downtown location. The theater complex boasts restaurant and retail space at street level and a two-level underground parking structure.

=== Climate ===
Redwood City, along with most of the Bay Area, enjoys a mild warm-summer Mediterranean climate (Köppen Csb), with warm, dry summers and cool, relatively wet winters. The National Weather Service, which maintains both a forecast center and a cooperative office in Redwood City, reports that December is the coolest month and July is the warmest month. The record highest temperature of 110 °F (43.3 °C) was recorded on three occasions, July 14 and 15, 1972, and September 6, 2022. The record lowest temperature of 16 °F (−8.9 °C) was recorded on January 11, 1949. Annually, there are an average of 21.6 afternoons with highs of 90 °F (32.2 °C) or higher and 2.8 afternoons with highs of 100 °F (37.8 °C) or higher; there are an average of 1.8 mornings with lows of 32 °F (0 °C) or lower.

The normal annual precipitation is 20.56 inches or 522.2 millimeters, although it has ranged from as little as 6.43 inches or 163.3 millimeters in the "rain year" from July 1975 to June 1976, to as much as 42.87 inches or 1,088.9 millimeters between July 1982 and June 1983. The most rainfall in one month was 12.42 inches or 315.5 millimeters in February 1998. The record 24-hour rainfall of 4.88 inches or 124.0 millimeters occurred on October 13, 1962. There are an average of 62.1 days with measurable precipitation. Snow flurries have been observed on rare occasions; there was some minor snow accumulation in May 1935, January 1962, and February 1976.

Climate data for Redwood City (Downtown), California, 1991–2020 normals, extremes 1930–present
Month	Jan	Feb	Mar	Apr	May	Jun	Jul	Aug	Sep	Oct	Nov	Dec	Year
Record high °F (°C)	78 (26)	80 (27)	94 (34)	97 (36)	102 (39)	109 (43)	110 (43)	105 (41)	110 (43)	104 (40)	88 (31)	76 (24)	110 (43)
Mean maximum °F (°C)	68.6 (20.3)	72.6 (22.6)	79.0 (26.1)	85.4 (29.7)	89.1 (31.7)	96.9 (36.1)	96.3 (35.7)	95.3 (35.2)	95.5 (35.3)	89.6 (32.0)	77.0 (25.0)	67.2 (19.6)	100.9 (38.3)
Mean daily maximum °F (°C)	58.9 (14.9)	61.9 (16.6)	65.3 (18.5)	68.5 (20.3)	72.9 (22.7)	78.8 (26.0)	81.0 (27.2)	80.8 (27.1)	79.3 (26.3)	74.6 (23.7)	64.7 (18.2)	58.6 (14.8)	70.4 (21.4)
Daily mean °F (°C)	49.7 (9.8)	52.2 (11.2)	54.9 (12.7)	57.5 (14.2)	61.6 (16.4)	66.2 (19.0)	68.8 (20.4)	68.7 (20.4)	66.8 (19.3)	62.2 (16.8)	54.3 (12.4)	49.4 (9.7)	59.4 (15.2)
Mean daily minimum °F (°C)	40.5 (4.7)	42.5 (5.8)	44.6 (7.0)	46.5 (8.1)	50.4 (10.2)	53.6 (12.0)	56.6 (13.7)	56.5 (13.6)	54.3 (12.4)	49.8 (9.9)	43.9 (6.6)	40.2 (4.6)	48.3 (9.0)
Mean minimum °F (°C)	31.7 (−0.2)	34.0 (1.1)	37.3 (2.9)	39.6 (4.2)	44.1 (6.7)	47.6 (8.7)	50.7 (10.4)	51.1 (10.6)	48.2 (9.0)	42.2 (5.7)	35.3 (1.8)	31.0 (−0.6)	29.8 (−1.2)
Record low °F (°C)	16 (−9)	25 (−4)	29 (−2)	31 (−1)	36 (2)	37 (3)	40 (4)	42 (6)	40 (4)	33 (1)	23 (−5)	18 (−8)	16 (−9)
Average precipitation inches (mm)	3.81 (97)	3.65 (93)	3.02 (77)	1.15 (29)	0.46 (12)	0.16 (4.1)	0.00 (0.00)	0.04 (1.0)	0.07 (1.8)	0.87 (22)	1.87 (47)	3.92 (100)	19.02 (483)
Average precipitation days (≥ 0.01 in)	9.3	9.1	9.4	4.9	2.9	0.9	0.0	0.2	0.5	2.5	6.3	9.3	55.3
Source 1: NOAA
Source 2: NWS

== Demographics ==
Historical population
Census	Pop.	Note	%±
1870	727		—
1880	1,383		90.2%
1890	1,572		13.7%
1900	1,653		5.2%
1910	2,442		47.7%
1920	4,020		64.6%
1930	8,962		122.9%
1940	12,453		39.0%
1950	25,544		105.1%
1960	46,290		81.2%
1970	55,686		20.3%
1980	54,951		−1.3%
1990	66,072		20.2%
2000	75,402		14.1%
2010	76,815		1.9%
2020	84,292		9.7%
U.S. Decennial Census; 1860–1870 1880-1890; 1900 1910 1920; 1930 1940 1950; 1960 1970 1980; 1990 2000 2010; 2020

=== Racial and ethnic composition ===
Redwood City city, California – Racial and ethnic composition Note: the US Census treats Hispanic/Latino as an ethnic category. This table excludes Latinos from the racial categories and assigns them to a separate category. Hispanics/Latinos may be of any race.
Race / Ethnicity (NH = Non-Hispanic)	Pop 2000	Pop 2010	Pop 2020	% 2000	% 2010	% 2020
White alone (NH)	40,656	33,801	34,067	53.92%	44.00%	40.42%
Black or African American alone (NH)	1,791	1,655	1,376	2.38%	2.15%	1.63%
Native American or Alaska Native alone (NH)	165	152	129	0.22%	0.20%	0.15%
Asian alone (NH)	6,604	8,063	13,522	8.76%	10.50%	16.04%
Native Hawaiian or Pacific Islander alone (NH)	635	732	618	0.84%	0.95%	0.73%
Other Race alone (NH)	163	291	502	0.22%	0.38%	0.60%
Mixed race or Multiracial (NH)	1,831	2,311	3,974	2.43%	3.01%	4.71%
Hispanic or Latino (any race)	23,557	29,810	30,104	31.24%	38.81%	35.71%
Total	75,402	76,815	84,292	100.00%	100.00%	100.00%

=== 2020 census ===
As of the 2020 census, Redwood City had a population of 84,292. The population density was 4,359.3 inhabitants per square mile (1,683.1/km^{2}). The median age was 37.1 years; 20.4% of residents were under age 18 and 13.0% were age 65 or older. For every 100 females, there were 100.5 males, and for every 100 females age 18 and over, there were 98.4 males.

The census reported that 97.2% of the population lived in households, 1.2% lived in non-institutionalized group quarters, and 1.6% were institutionalized. 99.9% of residents lived in urban areas, while 0.1% lived in rural areas.

There were 30,620 households, of which 32.2% had children under age 18 living in them. Of all households, 50.3% were married-couple households, 17.5% were households with a male householder and no spouse or partner present, and 23.7% were households with a female householder and no spouse or partner present. About 23.3% of households were made up of individuals, and 8.3% had someone living alone who was age 65 or older. The average household size was 2.68, and there were 20,287 families (66.3% of all households).

There were 32,373 housing units at an average density of 1,674.2 units per square mile (646.4 units/km^{2}), of which 5.4% were vacant. Of occupied units, 46.8% were owner-occupied and 53.2% were renter-occupied. The homeowner vacancy rate was 0.6%, and the rental vacancy rate was 5.6%.

=== Income and housing value ===
The 2020 United States census reported that Redwood City had a median household income of $123,294 and a median house value of $1,424,200.

=== 2010 census ===
The 2010 United States census reported that Redwood City had a population of 76,815. The population density was 3,955.5 inhabitants per square mile (1,527.2/km^{2}). The racial makeup of Redwood City was 46,255 (60.2%) White, 1,881 (2.4%) African American, 511 (0.7%) Native American, 8,216 (10.7%) Asian, 795 (1.0%) Pacific Islander, 14,967 (19.5%) from other races, and 4,190 (5.5%) from two or more races. Hispanic or Latino of any race were 29,810 persons (38.8%). Non-Hispanic Whites number 31,982 (40.9%). The U.S. Census Bureau estimated Redwood City's population at 82,178 as of July 1, 2025.

The Census reported that 75,268 people (98.0% of the population) lived in households, 408 (0.5%) lived in non-institutionalized group quarters, and 1,139 (1.5%) were institutionalized.

There were 27,957 households, out of which 10,045 (35.9%) had children under the age of 18 living in them, 13,642 (48.8%) were opposite-sex married couples living together, 3,139 (11.2%) had a female householder with no husband present, 1,461 (5.2%) had a male householder with no wife present. There were 1,818 (6.5%) unmarried opposite-sex partnerships, and 288 (1.0%) same-sex married couples or partnerships. 7,411 households (26.5%) were made up of individuals, and 2,401 (8.6%) had someone living alone who was 65 years of age or older. The average household size was 2.69. There were 18,242 families (65.3% of all households); the average family size was 3.26.

There were 18,193 people (23.7%) under the age of 18, 5,981 people (7.8%) aged 18 to 24, 24,819 people (32.3%) aged 25 to 44, 19,710 people (25.7%) aged 45 to 64, and 8,112 people (10.6%) who were 65 years of age or older. The median age was 36.7 years. For every 100 females, there were 99.2 males. For every 100 females age 18 and over, there were 98.1 males.

There were 29,167 housing units at an average density of 1,501.9 per square mile (579.9/km^{2}), of which 14,160 (50.6%) were owner-occupied, and 13,797 (49.4%) were occupied by renters. The homeowner vacancy rate was 1.3%; the rental vacancy rate was 3.9%. Further, 37,757 people (49.2% of the population) lived in owner-occupied housing units and 37,511 people (48.8%) lived in rental housing units.

== Government ==
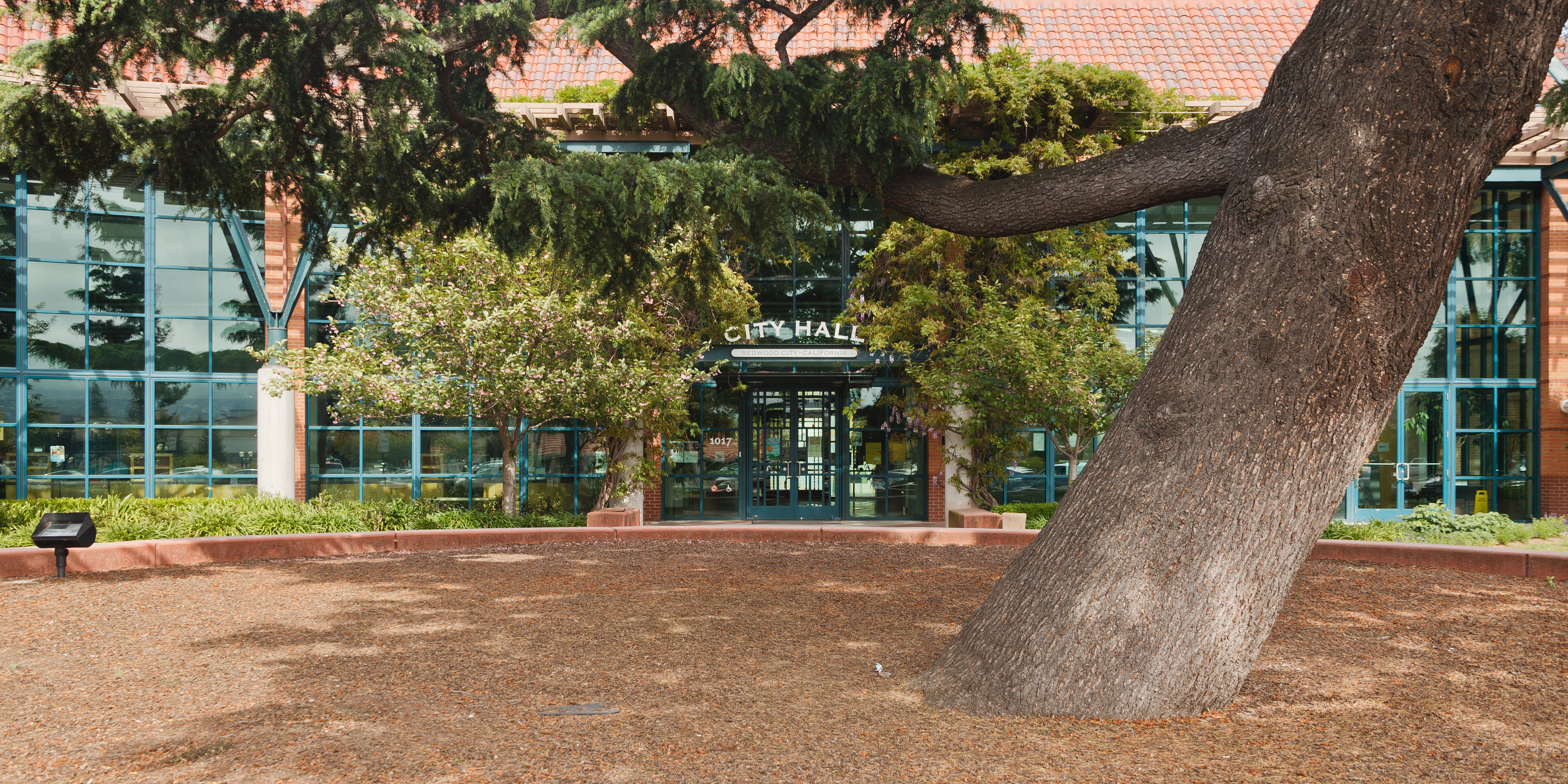
City Hall

Redwood City's charter provides for a councilor-manager form of government. The City Council appoints the City Manager and adopts policies, which the City Manager is expected to implement. The City Manager appoints and manages most of Redwood City's department heads (the City Clerk and City Attorney being notable exceptions).

The City Council seats are currently held by Mayor Elmer Martínez Saballos (District 4), Vice Mayor Kaia Eakin (District 5), Isabella Chu (District 3), Jeff Gee (District 1), Diane Howard (District 6), Marcella Padilla (District 7), and Chris Sturken (District 2). The current City Manager is Patrick Heisinger.

In the California State Legislature, Redwood City is in the 13th senatorial district, represented by Democrat Josh Becker, and in the 21st Assembly district, represented by Democrat Diane Papan.

In the United States House of Representatives, Redwood City is in California's 15th congressional district, represented by Democrat Kevin Mullin.

According to the California Secretary of State, as of February 10, 2025, Redwood City has 45,008 registered voters. Of those, 25,507 (56.67%) are registered Democrats, 6,399 (14.2%) are registered Republicans, and 10,523 (23.38%) have declined to state a political party.

== Religion ==
The city's main Catholic church, Our Lady of Mount Carmel, was founded in 1887 with Fr. Daniel O'Sullivan as its first pastor.

== Landmarks ==
- Union Cemetery, State Historical Landmark #816
- Fox Theatre
- Lathrop House
- Sequoia High School

== Parks ==
Preserves include Bair Island Ecological Preserve (State) and the Don Edwards National Wildlife Refuge on the shoreline. Edgewood County Park known for its wildflowers is towards the Santa Cruz Mountains with entrances off Edgewood Road and Cañada Road.

City parks include:

- Andrew Spinas Park (1.46 acres or 0.59 hectares) – 2nd Ave./Bay Rd. Established in 1966 and named for Andrew L. Spinas, a longtime Redwood City teacher and school superintendent who served on the Parks and Recreation Commission from 1938 to 1953.
- Dolphin Park (2.36 acres or 0.96 hectares) – Turks Head/Quay Ln.
- Dove Beeger Park (1 acre or 0.40 hectares) – Whipple Ave./Circle Rd.
- Fleishman Park (.63 acres or 0.25 hectares) – Locust St./McEvoy St.
- Garrett Park (6.9 acres or 2.8 hectares) – 3600 Block Glenwood Ave. Named for George L. Garrett Jr., who was a Redwood City police officer killed in 1981.
- Hawes Park (1.59 acres or 0.64 hectares) – Hudson St./Roosevelt Ave. Built in 1934 and named for Horace Hawes, state assemblyman, who in 1864 donated land and money to the city for a new school.
- Hoover Park (10.18 acres or 4.12 hectares) – Woodside Rd./Spring St.
- Jardin de Niños (.31 acres or 0.13 hectares) – Middlefield Rd./Chestnut St.
- Linden Park (.22 acres or 0.089 hectares) – Linden St./Park St.
- Maddux Park (.62 acres or 0.25 hectares) – Maddux Dr./Kensington Rd.
- Mariner Park (6.25 acres or 2.53 hectares) – Tiller Lane/Bridge Parkway
- Marlin Park (11.15 acres or 4.51 hectares) – Neptune Dr./Cringle Dr.
- Mezes Park (1.67 acres or 0.68 hectares) – Warren St./Standish St. Named for Simon Mezes, who donated the land in 1856.
- Palm Park (.9 acres or 0.36 hectares) – Hudson St./Palm Ave.
- Preserve Park (3.5 acres or 1.4 hectares) – 99 Shearwater Parkway
- Red Morton Community Park (31.74 acres or 12.84 hectares) – 1120 Roosevelt Ave.
- Sandpiper Park (11.07 acres or 4.48 hectares) – Redwood Shores Parkway and Egret Ln.
- Shannon Park (1.87 acres or 0.76 hectares) – Davit Lane/Shannon Way
- Shore Dogs Park (.69 acres or 0.28 hectares) – 1300 Block Radio Rd.
- Shorebird Park (3.68 acres or 1.49 hectares) – Marine Parkway/Island Dr.
- Stafford Park (1.62 acres or 0.66 hectares) – King St./Hopkins Ave. Established in 1946 and named for donor Daniel R. Stafford (1870–1948), who had been a Redwood City grocer, city clerk, and mayor.
- Stulsaft Park (42.06 acres or 17.02 hectares) – 3737 Farm Hill Blvd. Established in 1951 and named for real estate developer Morris Stulsaft, who donated the land.
- Wellesley Crescent Park (.75 acres or 0.30 hectares) – Edgewood Rd./Arlington Rd.
- Westwood Park (.25 acres or 0.10 hectares) – Westwood St./Briarfield Ave.

== Education ==
Redwood City has one state community college, Cañada College.

It has elementary and middle schools operated by both the Redwood City School District and the Belmont – Redwood Shores School District. At the high school level it is part of the Sequoia Union High School District and high schools in Redwood City that are part of this district are the comprehensive Sequoia High School, the charter schools Summit Preparatory Charter High School and Everest Public High School, and the continuation school Redwood High School. Many students from Redwood City attend another Sequoia Union school, Woodside High School, in the neighboring town of Woodside. The community of Redwood Shores is served by the Belmont - Redwood Shores School District and Carlmont High School.

The Redwood City Public Library, a member of the Peninsula Library System, has a Downtown Library and two neighborhood branch locations: Redwood Shores and Schaberg. The city's first library opened in 1865 and in 1900 the city passed a special tax to support a free public library. In 1904, Andrew Carnegie gave $10,000 for a new library; he gave another $6,000 to rebuild it after it was destroyed in the 1906 San Francisco earthquake. In 1959, the Schaberg Branch Library opened, funded by a bequest in the will of Hannah Schaberg, widow of former County Clerk Herman W. Schaberg. The Redwood Shores Branch Library was completed and opened to the public in 2008.

== Transportation ==
U.S. Route 101 passes through Redwood City as it goes along the Peninsula. Other major thoroughfares include El Camino Real, Route 82; Woodside Rd, Route 84, and I-280, which passes west of the city. Redwood City has a stop on Caltrain, and local bus service is provided by SamTrans.

== Slogan ==
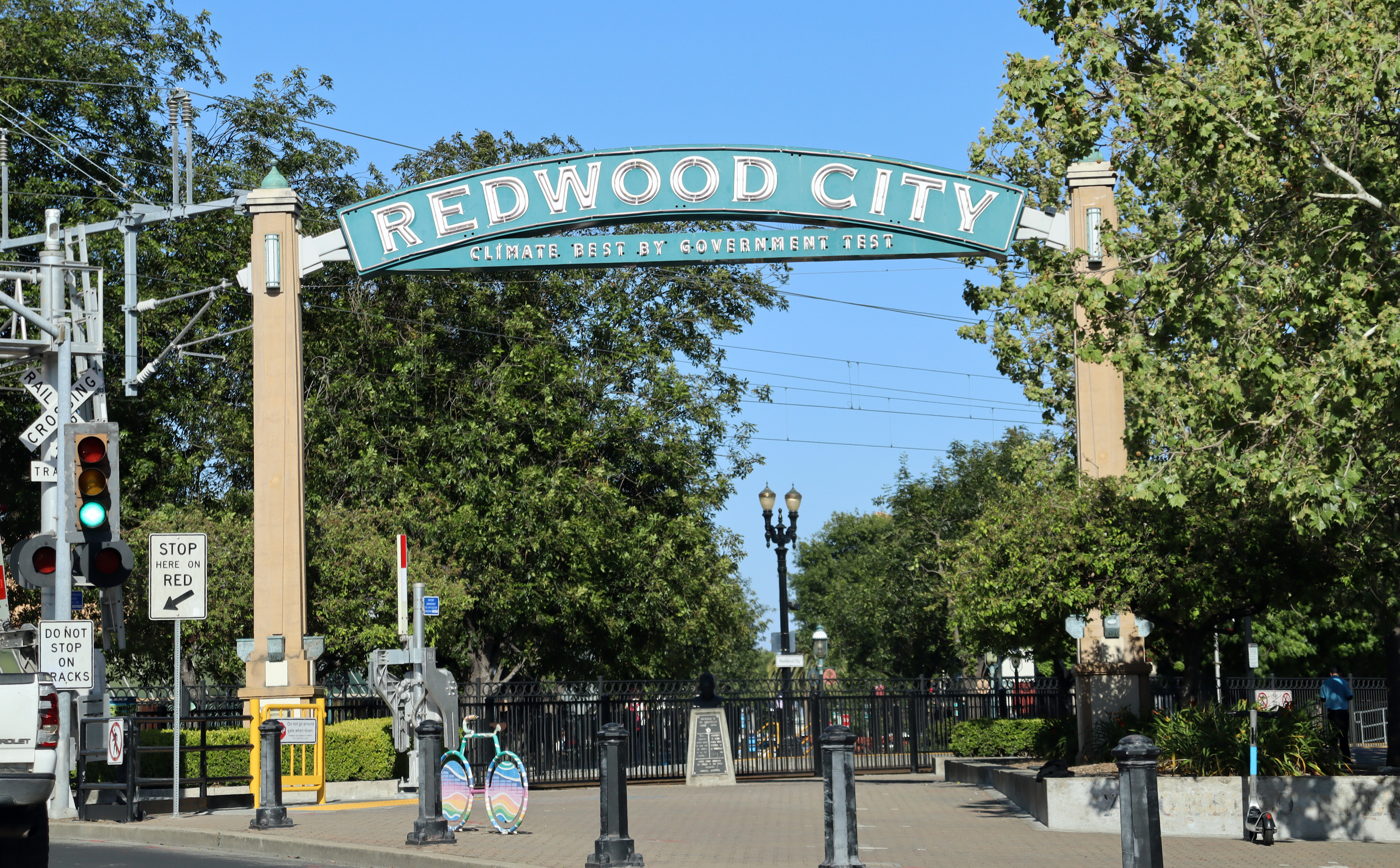
The western arch with the city slogan below

Redwood City's slogan, emblazoned on arches across Broadway at the east and west entrances to downtown, is "Climate Best By Government Test". This is based on a climatological survey conducted by the United States and German governments prior to World War I. The area centered on Redwood City tied for the world's best climate with the Canary Islands and North Africa's Mediterranean Coast. The local paper had a contest for a city slogan to attract new residents and Wilbur Doxsee entered "By Government Test, Our Climate is Best" which won the $10 prize money in 1925.

== Independence Day parade ==
Redwood City's Independence Day parade sponsored by the Peninsula Celebration Association, held continuously since 1939, has been billed variously as 'The largest Independence Day Parade in California', 'West of the Mississippi', or 'in North America', claims which may or may not be accurate. The first verifiable written records of celebrations date to 1861, and 1887 for a parade.

== Media ==
=== Games ===
- The 3rd person Action Adventure Tomb Raider developer Crystal Dynamics is based in Redwood City.

=== Media companies ===
- Ampex Corporation, a pioneer and major developer of the audio recording, video recording, and data storage industries, headquartered management, engineering, and manufacturing in Redwood City for decades.
- Several DreamWorks animated films (e.g., Antz (1998), Shrek (2001), Shrek 2 (2004), and Madagascar (2005)) were made by PDI/DreamWorks (the Northern California branch of DreamWorks Animation), which moved to Redwood City from nearby Palo Alto (Park Drive) in October 2002.
- Video game publisher Electronic Arts is based in the Redwood Shores neighborhood of Redwood City.
- The North American subsidiaries of Konami and Sega were formerly both based in Redwood City until they relocated to Hawthorne and Irvine, respectively.
- ABS-CBN International, a subsidiary of Philippine media conglomerate ABS-CBN Corporation, was headquartered at 150 Shoreline Drive until relocating its headquarters to Daly City.

== Economy ==
A number of technology companies are headquartered or maintain major operations in Redwood City, including BroadVision, DPR Construction, Electronic Arts, GoFundMe, Informatica, Openwave, Shutterfly, Equinix, and YuMe. NeXT was headquartered in the city prior to its acquisition by Apple in 1997.

=== Cargill salt ponds ===
Cargill has operated salt ponds in Redwood City, and has proposed development of the ponds, resulting in demands for restoration of some of the land. The plans are currently stalled.

=== Top employers ===
As of 2022, the top employers in the city were:

Rank	Employer	No. of Employees
1	Oracle Corporation	4,952
2	Stanford Hospital and Clinics	2,700
3	County of San Mateo	2,659
4	Box Inc.	1,760
5	Guardant Health	1,654
6	Electronic Arts	1,600
7	Genomic Health	861
8	Auris Surgical Robotics	833
9	Google	731
10	Informatica	695

== Sister cities ==
- Zhuhai, Guangdong, China, became a sister city in 1993.
- Colima, Colima, Mexico, became a sister city in 1998.
- Ciudad Guzman, Jalisco, Mexico, became a sister city in 2013.
- Qingyuan, Guangdong, China, became a friendship city in 2015.
- Aguililla, Michoacan, Mexico, became a sister city in 2017, after becoming a friendship city in 2013.

== Notable people ==
=== Politicians ===
- Karl W. Hofmann, diplomat, ambassador and president of Population Services International
- Jon Huntsman Jr., American politician and diplomat
- Corrin Rankin, chair of the California Republican Party (2025-present)
- William Royer, mayor of Redwood City (1956–1960)

=== Sports ===
- Davante Adams, National Football League (NFL) wide receiver for the Los Angeles Rams
- Daniel Aguirre, Liga MX midfielder for club Guadalajara
- Kevin Bass, Major League Baseball (MLB) right fielder for the Houston Astros and the San Francisco Giants
- Joe Biagini, MLB player for the Toronto Blue Jays
- Alexis Blokhina, tennis player
- Geoff Blum, MLB infielder and broadcaster
- Eric Byrnes, MLB outfielder
- Greg Camarillo, NFL wide receiver
- Chris Carter, MLB first baseman
- Jeff Clark, big wave surfer
- Daniel Descalso, MLB infielder
- Julian Edelman, NFL wide receiver, three-time Super Bowl champion, and the Most Valuable Player (MVP) of Super Bowl LIII
- Daniel Nava, MLB outfielder
- James Outman, MLB outfielder
- Brian Shima, professional inline skater
- Regan Smith, Olympic swimmer, record holder in 200m backstroke and 100m backstroke
- Jenise Spiteri, Olympic snowboarder
- Zach Test, rugby union player
- Matangi Tonga, American football linebacker
- Roy Williams, five-time NFL Pro Bowler
- Lily Zhang, Olympic table tennis player

=== Entertainment ===
- Cedric Bixler-Zavala, musician
- Michael Shrieve, musician, producer
- Linda Cardellini, actress
- Bela Lugosi, actor
- Joyce MacKenzie, actress
- Ross Malinger, actor
- Lydia Pense, musician and singer
- Chris Roberts, developer of Wing Commander
- Chelsi Smith (1973–2018), Miss Universe 1995

=== Military ===
- Robert D. Walsh, U.S. Army brigadier general

== See also ==
- Seaport Centre – Business park
- The Guardian – Artwork in Redwood City, California
