= Redwood City School District =

School district in California, United States

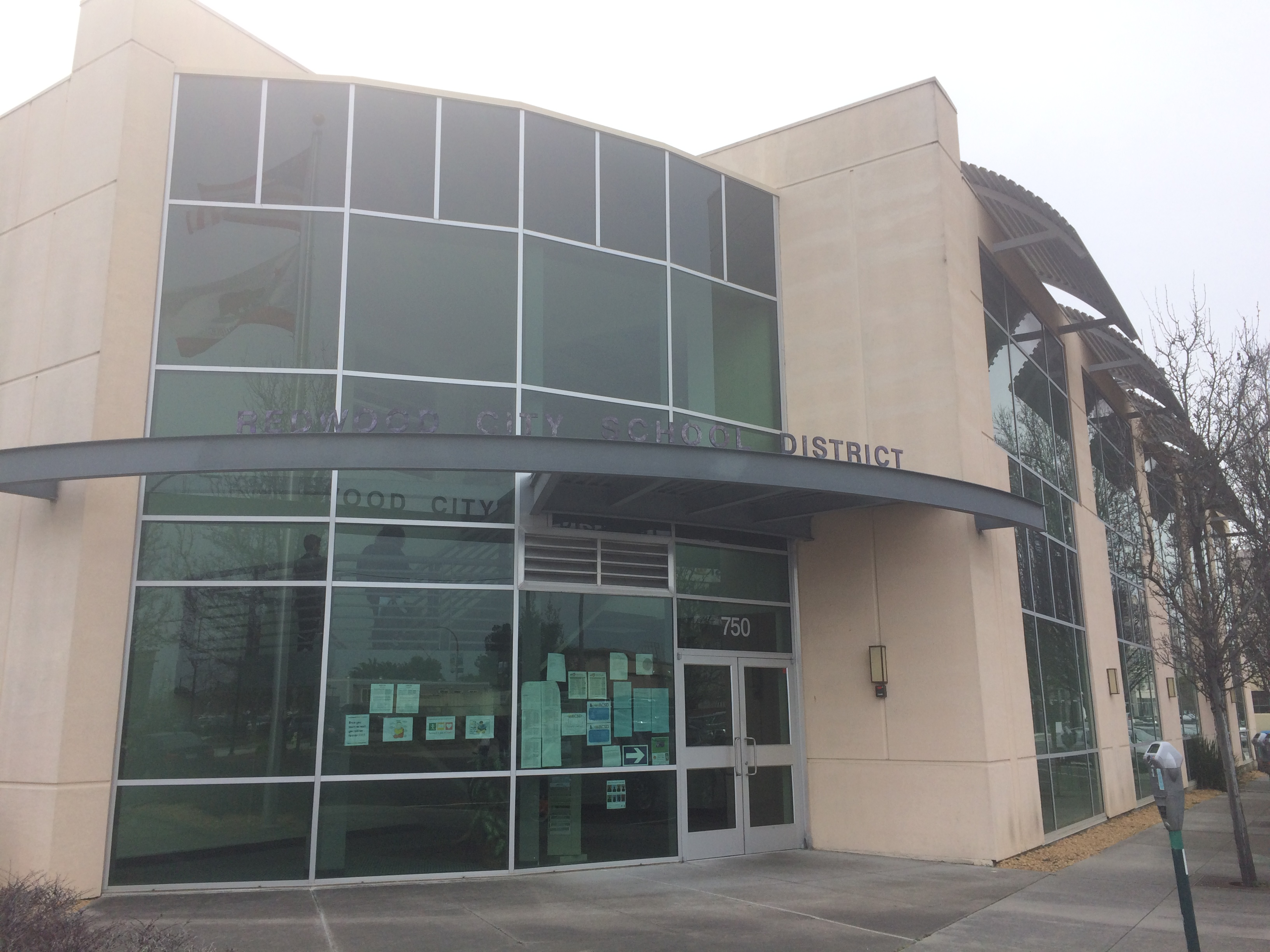
- District headquarters

Address
- 750 Bradford Street Redwood City, California, 94063; United States

District information
- Type: Public
- Grades: K–8
- NCES District ID: 0632130

Students and staff
- Students: 6,770 (2020–2021)
- Teachers: 307.12 (FTE)
- Staff: 377.47 (FTE)
- Student–teacher ratio: 22.04:1

Other information
- Website: www.rcsdk8.net

Redwood City School District (RCSD) is the public elementary school district serving Redwood City, California. As of 2019–2020 school year, the district serves over 8,500 students in 16 schools.

== Schools ==
Elementary Schools (grades K-8)

- Clifford School
- Roy Cloud School
- Garfield School
- Hoover School
- Selby Lane School
- Roosevelt School
- North Star Academy (grades 3–8), is a California Distinguished School, and received a Blue Ribbon School award for 2012. North Star Academy and McKinley Institute of Technology share the same campus.

Elementary Schools (grades K-5)

- Adelante Selby Spanish Immersion School (grades K-6), is a school with a Spanish and English dual-immersion program. Was formerly known as Selby Lane Elementary School which merged with Adelante Spanish Immersion School in 2020.
- Fair Oaks School
- Henry Ford School
- Hawes School
- Orion Alternative Elementary School, which merged in 2020 with the John Gill School and offers a Mandarin language immersion program.
- Taft School

Middle Schools (grades 6–8)

- Kennedy Middle School
- McKinley Institute of Technology

== History ==
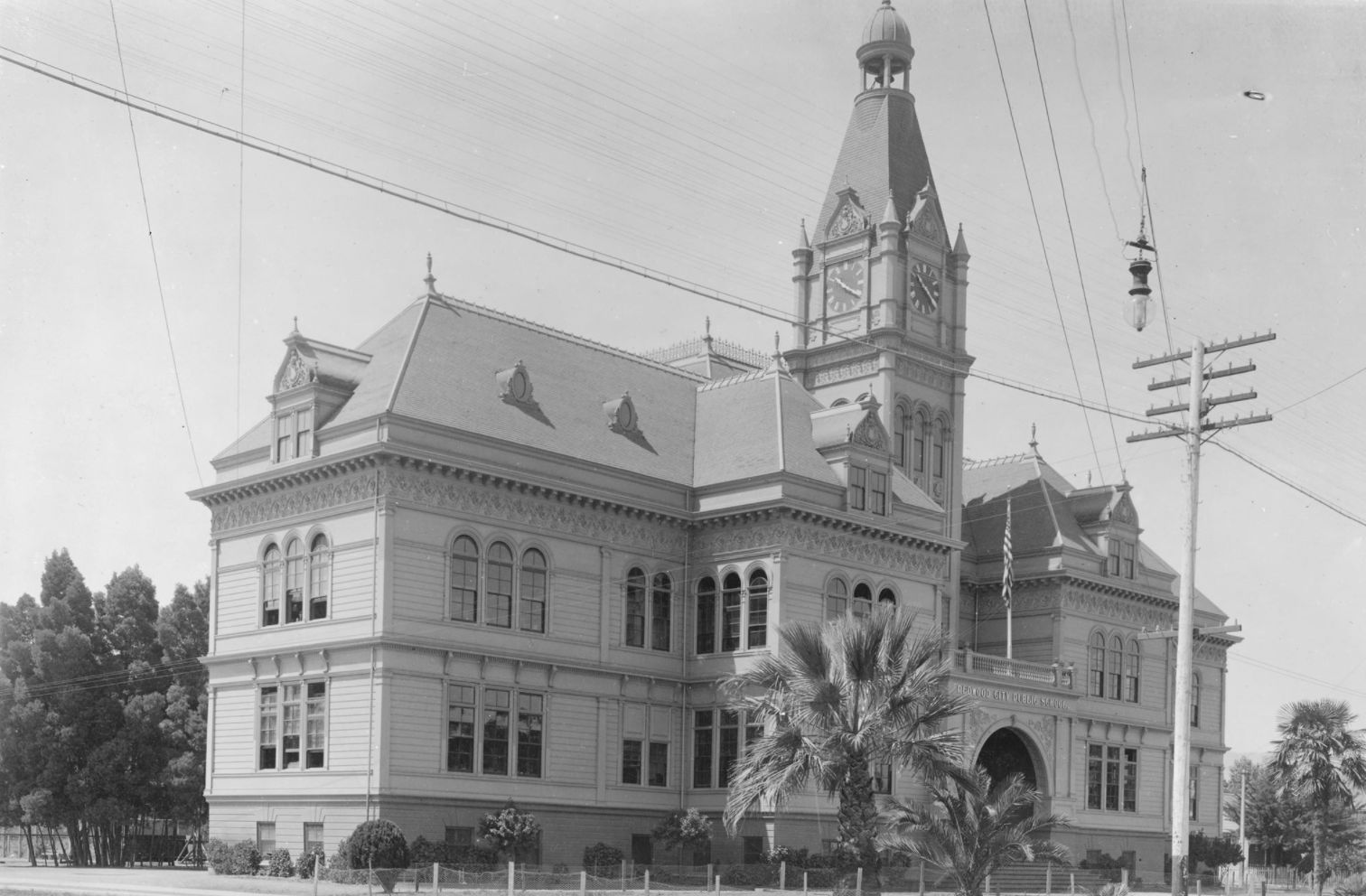
Redwood City Grammar School in 1912

The first school building in Redwood City was called Redwood City Grammar School (also known as the Redwood City Public School) which was opened in September 1895 and located on Broadway Street across from the courthouse. In the early years of the school, the first two floors of the building were dedicated to the elementary school and the third floor was occupied by Sequoia High School. This was the only school on the Peninsula between San Francisco and Santa Clara at the time of its opening. By 1927, the Redwood City Grammar School was demolished and replaced by the Fox Theatre.

One of the earliest graduating students in the RCSD school district was Roy Cloud, he graduated from Sequoia High School in 1898. Cloud became a teacher at Redwood City Grammar School, while working on his degree from Stanford University.

A school building nearby on Broadway Street near Middlefield Road existed from 1904 until 1928 and occupied an elementary school named Central School.

Between 1916 and 1932, five new schools are built including Washington School (now closed), Lincoln School (now closed), Garfield School, John Gill School and McKinley School.

== See also ==
- Sequoia High School
- Sequoia Union High School District
