= Ricardo Arguello =

Mexican sprinter

Personal information
- Nationality: Mexican
- Born: August 14, 1911
- Died: May 25, 1985 (aged 73)

Sport
- Sport: Sprinting
- Event: 400 metres

Ricardo Arguello (August 14, 1911 - May 25, 1985) was a Mexican sprinter. He competed in the men's 400 metres at the 1932 Summer Olympics.
