= Irma Arguello =

Argentine security expert

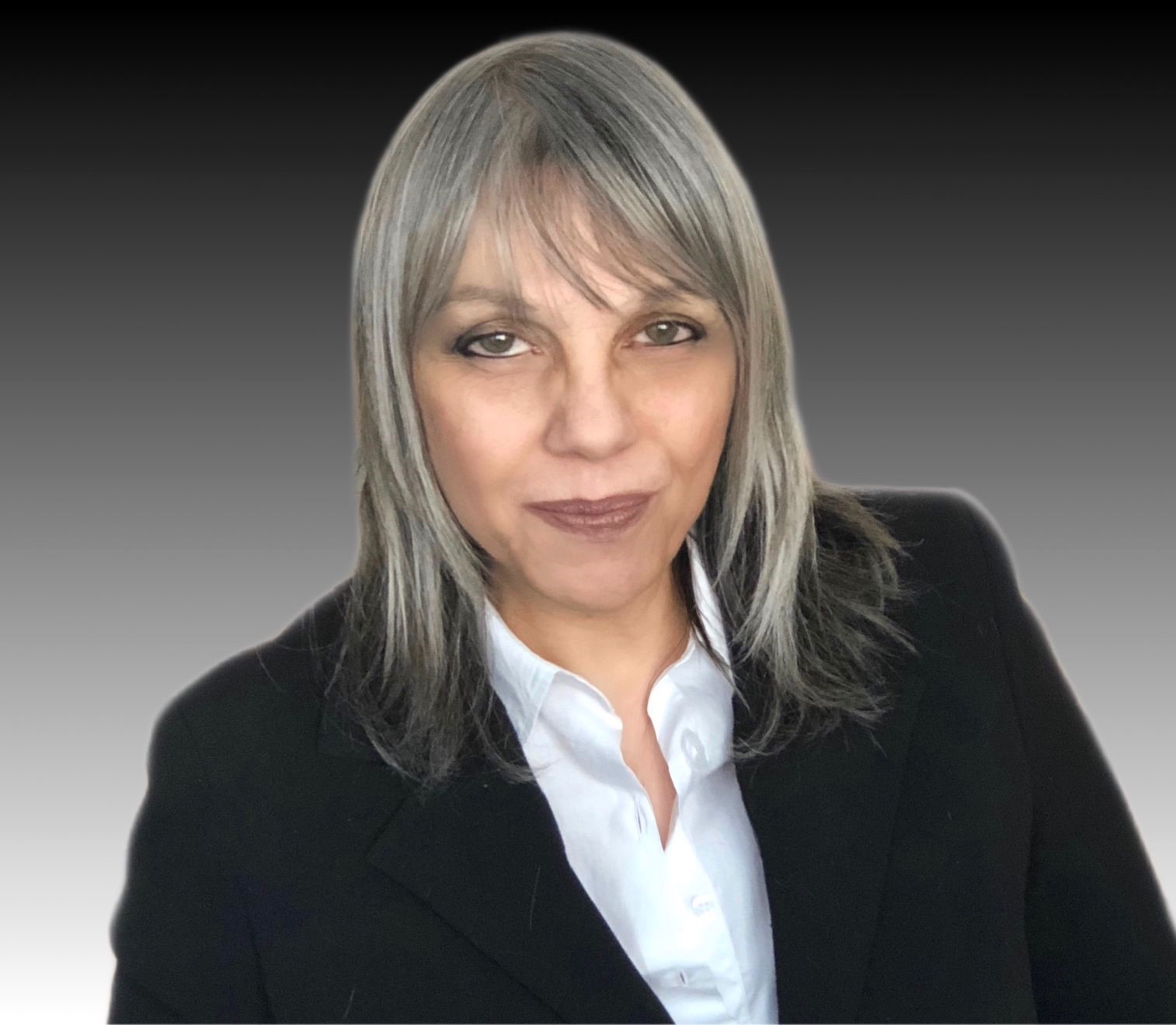
Irma Arguello in 2025

Irma Arguello is an Argentine international security expert, strategist, and founder and chair of the Nonproliferation for Global Security Foundation (NPSGLOBAL). Her work focuses on international security and nuclear risk reduction. In recent years, her work has expanded to include emerging technologies and artificial intelligence, including analysis of AI governance and global security implications.

She is also a political referent and communicator in her country, Argentina. In 2023, she created the Iniciativa Republicana Foundation, a non-governmental organization devoted to preserving the democratic and republican values that inspire free societies worldwide.

== Education ==
Arguello has a degree in Physics Science from the University of Buenos Aires, including a master's degree in Business Administration from IDEA/Wharton School, as well as completed Defense and Security studies (Master level) at the Escuela de Defensa Nacional, Argentina.

== Career ==
Her broad knowledge of nuclear issues related to her vast working experience led her, after her graduation, to work as a scientist at the CNEA (National Atomic Energy Commission of Argentina) for the LPR (Laboratory of Radio-chemical Processes Project). This included the design of an Argentine reprocessing plant located in Ezeiza, outside Buenos Aires City.

In the private sector, she has held managerial positions in multinational companies such as the Latin American Petrochemical Association and ExxonMobil Corporation, where she focused on strategic planning, business analysis, communications, and human resources.

In addition to her activities in NPSGLOBAL (An institution where she is the Chief of the postgraduate course in international security, disarmament, and Non-proliferation), she is the Head of the Secretariat of the Latin American and Caribbean Leadership Network for Nuclear Disarmament and Nonproliferation, an organization which congregates prominent high-level former state-persons and leaders in the region in order to influence the definition of state policies to propose measures to reduce global/regional nuclear risks.

== Membership ==
She is a member of the Steering Committee of the International Nuclear Security Forum (former Fissile Materials Working Group), a non-governmental coalition of over 70 organizations from around the world that are committed to improving fissile material security and the prevention of nuclear terrorism.

Since 2010, she organized and participated as a speaker at all official no-governmental events that were held as part of the Nuclear Security Summits that congregated more than 50 heads of state: In 2010, Washington: 2012, Seoul; 2014, The Nertherlands and 2016, Washington.

She is also a member of the Nuclear Security Governance Expert Group - integrated by globally diverse experts devoted to propose improvements in the global nuclear security regime.

Among other affiliations, she was an Associate Fellow at Chatham House, a world-famous think tank in London, where she is involved in nuclear disarmament and cyber security projects. She also forms part of the Consultative Committee of the PIR Center International Expert Group.

She participated in the World Economic Forum's Council on Nuclear Security from 2014 to 2016. The Forum sought to better understand and catalyze global, regional, and industry transformation.

Arguello is usually appointed to speak before different audiences. She has written many articles, papers, and Op-Eds relating to her fields of expertise and is usually called to speak at international events and communication media.
