= José Darío Argüello =

Californio politician, soldier and ranchero (1753–1828)

Interim Governor of Alta California
- In office 1814–1815
- Preceded by: José Joaquín de Arrillaga
- Succeeded by: Pablo Vicente de Solá

Governor of Baja California
- In office 1815–1822

Personal details
- Born: 1753 Santiago de Querétaro, New Spain
- Died: 1828 (age 75) Guadalajara, Jalisco, Mexico
- Spouse: María Ygnacia Moraga
- Profession: Politician, soldier

José Darío Argüello (1753–1828) was a Querétaro-born Californio politician, soldier, and ranchero. He served as interim Governor of Alta California and then a term as Governor of Baja California.

== Biography ==
José Darío Argüello was born in 1753 in Santiago de Querétaro, New Spain (present day Mexico).

Argüello enlisted in the Mexico regiment of dragoons, serving as a private, and later sergeant of the presidial company of Altar, Sonora. In 1781 he was promoted to alférez (sub-lieutenant) and commandant for what was to become the Presidio of Santa Barbara in Alta California.

Founding Los Angeles Under orders from Governor Felipe de Neve, Argüello led the first ten Los Angeles Pobladores families and their livestock overland to settle. Military commander Fernando Rivera y Moncada led the guard, until killed during a civil resistance uprising by Quechan Indians near Yuma Crossing.

Argüello and the settlers continued onward to Mission San Gabriel in today's San Gabriel Valley. They founded the Pueblo de Los Angeles beside the Los Angeles River on September 4, 1781. This became present day Los Angeles, California.

Presidio commandant He continued on to Santa Barbara when the Presidio of Santa Barbara was founded in 1782. In 1787, Argüello was appointed lieutenant and commandant of the Presidio of San Francisco, serving until 1791 and again from 1796 to 1806. In between he was commandant of the Presidio of Monterey, from 1791 to 1796.

Rancho de las Pulgas In 1795, Governor Diego de Borica issued Argüello a Spanish land grant, the Rancho de las Pulgas (Ranch of the Fleas). This rancho was the largest grant on the San Francisco Peninsula consisting of 35,260 acres (142.7 km^{2}). It was in present-day San Mateo County, and encompassed contemporary San Mateo, Belmont, San Carlos, Redwood City, Atherton and Menlo Park.

== Governor ==
Alta California After the death of Governor José Joaquín de Arrillaga, Argüello was appointed acting governor of Alta California from 1814 to 1815 while he remained in Santa Barbara.

Baja California In 1815, Argüello was appointed governor of Baja California, serving until 1822. He died in Guadalajara, Jalisco, in 1828.

== Family ==
Argüello married Maria Ygnacia Moraga. Their daughter, Maria Concepción (María Jesús Argüello), is the subject of an early California love story, portrayed in the Russian rock opera Juno and Avos.

Two of their sons came to public service in Alta California also: Luis Antonio Argüello, California's first native-born governor (1822–1825); and Santiago Argüello, who was commandant of the Presidio of San Diego and alcalde (mayor) of Pueblo de San Diego. Other children: Teniente José Darío Argüello, Joaquín Máximo Argüello; Gervasio Argüello and Ana Gertrudis Rudecinda Argüello. José Darío Argüello died in 1828, at the then quite elderly age of 75, in Guadalajara, Jalisco, Mexico.

== Legacy ==
- Point Arguello in Santa Barbara County just west of Lompoc, California, was named in Argüello's honor by George Vancouver in 1793.
- In San Francisco, Arguello Boulevard, which leads into the Presidio of San Francisco, CA, was also named in his honor.
- Arguello Park in San Carlos, California, an area that was formerly a part of Argüello's 35,240-acre (142.6 km2) Rancho de las Pulgas was also named after him.
