= Crystal Springs Uplands School =

Prep school in Hillsborough, California, US

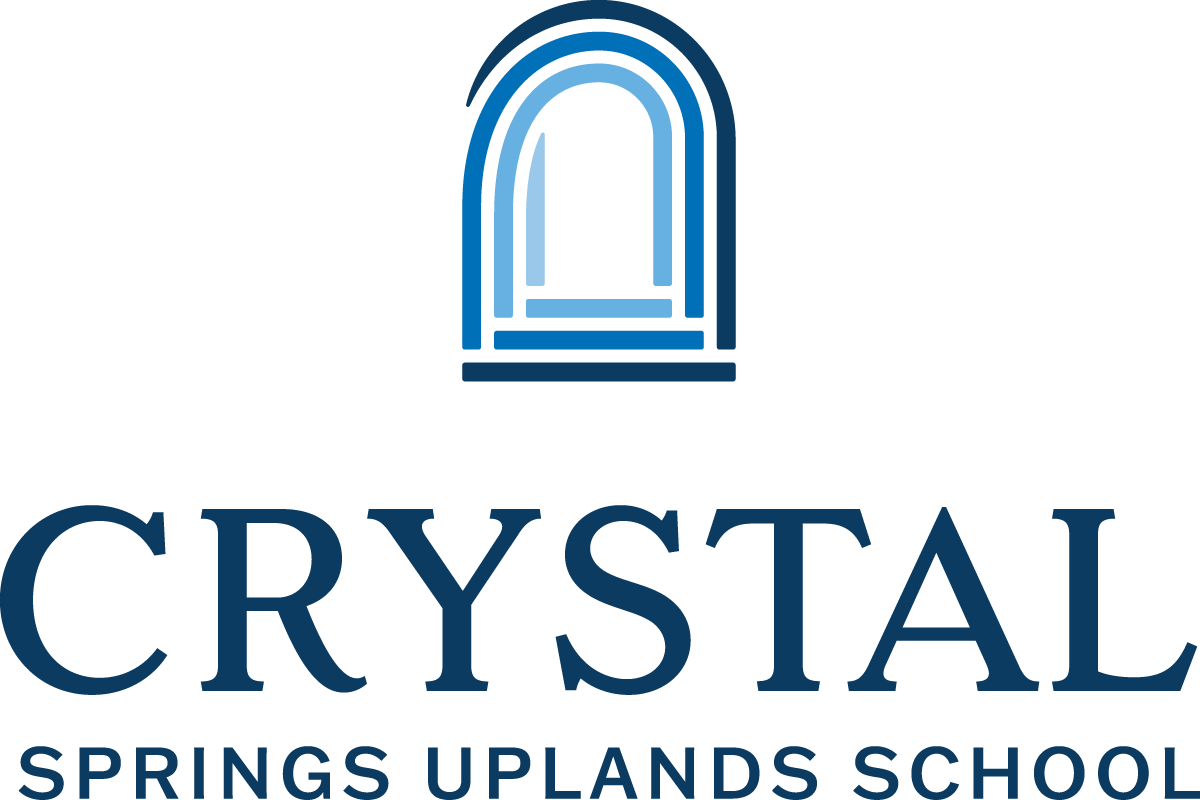

Location
- Upper School Campus: 400 Uplands Drive, Hillsborough; Middle School Campus: 10 Davis Drive, Belmont; Hillsborough; Belmont, California 94010; 94002; United States
- 37°33′28″N 122°20′18″W

Information
- Type: Private
- Established: 1952
- Head of School: Kelly Sortino
- Faculty: 80
- Gender: coeducational
- Enrollment: 542; 219 middle school 323 upper school
- Student to teacher ratio: 9:1
- Campus: Suburban
- Campus size: 10 acres (40,000 m^{2})
- Colors: Blue and red
- Athletics: Middle School: 9 sports, 26 teams Upper School: 11 sports, 24 teams
- Athletics conference: CCS
- Mascot: Gryphon
- Tuition: $63,300
- Website: crystal.org
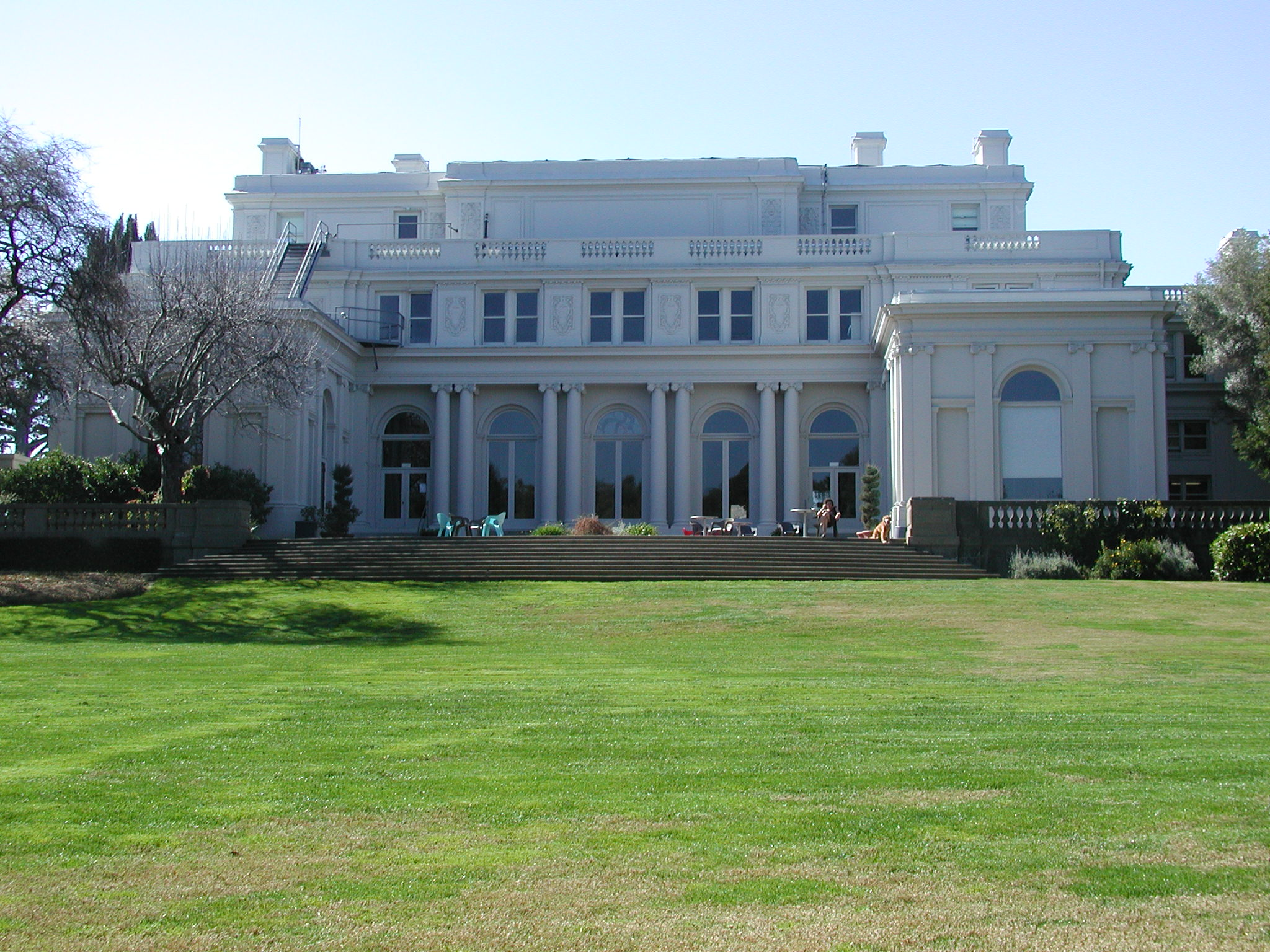
- Uplands Mansion

Crystal Springs Uplands School is an independent, coeducational, college prep day school in Hillsborough, California, United States. Founded in 1952, the school includes grades 6–12, with approximately 220 students in the middle school and 320 students in the upper school.

In late 2007, The Wall Street Journal identified Crystal Springs Uplands School as one of the world's top 50 schools for its success in preparing students to enter top American universities.

== History ==
=== Uplands Mansion ===
Uplands (as completed)

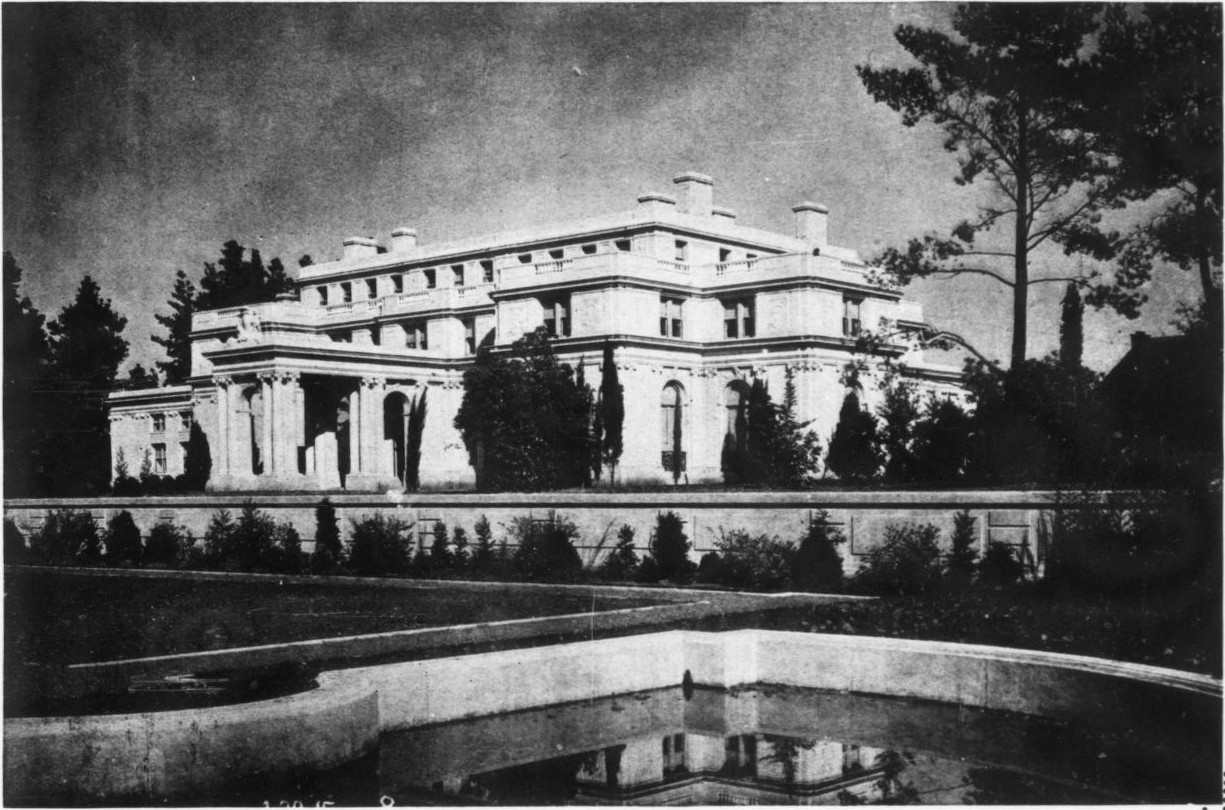
Front façade and porte-cochère

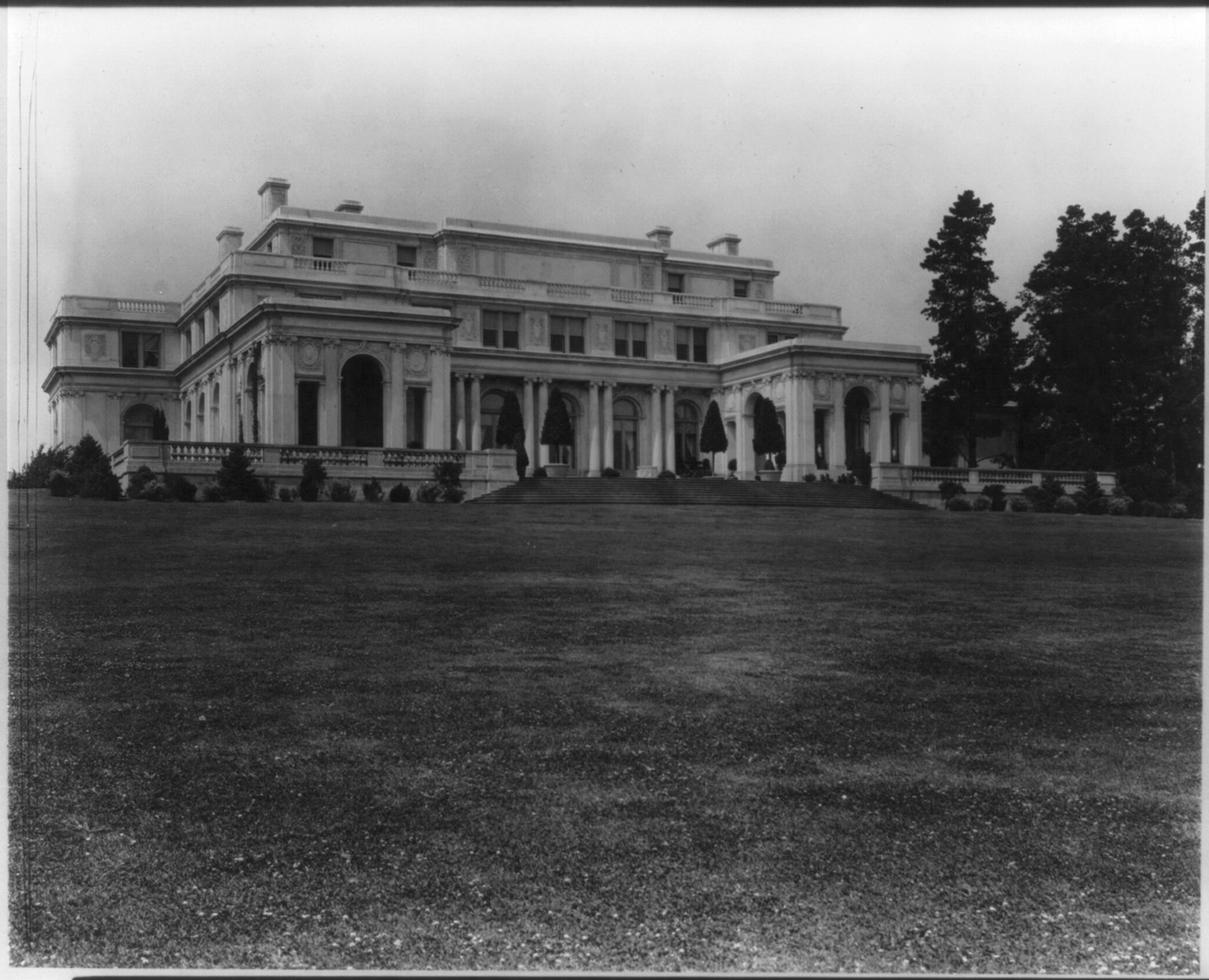
Rear, photographed by Frances Benjamin Johnston.

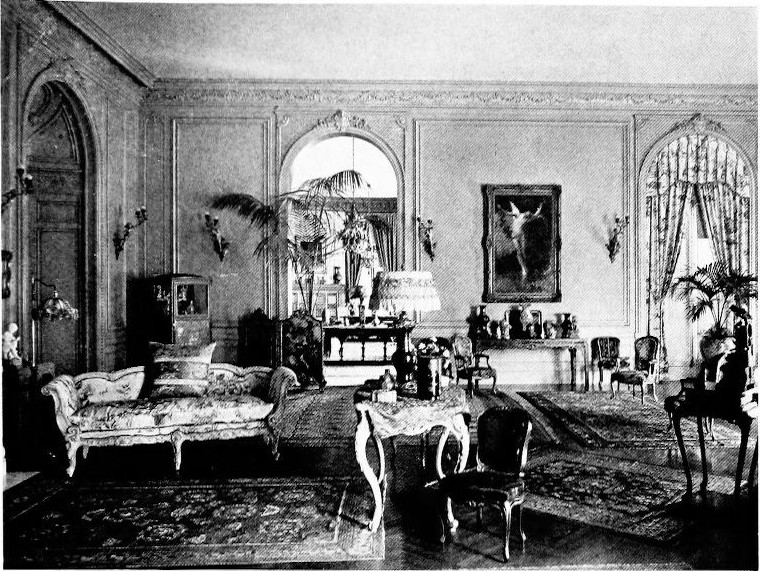
Drawing room

The main building of the Crystal campus is the Uplands Mansion, originally built as a private residence by Templeton Crocker, scion of railroad baron Charles F. Crocker. Crocker hired architect Willis Polk to design the home in the style of a neo-classical Renaissance palazzo, although Porter Garnett called it "more a varied, free, and personal interpretation of classic architecture than a rendering of the neoclassic", adding that "Mr. Polk proves that he can be at once daring and discreet, reckless and restrained" in 1915. It has since been recognized as the first Beaux-Arts mansion in Hillsborough. Construction of the 45,000-square-foot (4,200 m^{2}) home started in 1911 and was completed in 1917 after six years, at a cost of $1.6 million ($40.2 million in 2025 dollars). The plans, filed in 1913, were noted as the "bulkiest document ever filed at the county recorder's office", weighing 100 lb (45 kg) with 39 pages of blueprints and requiring a separate drawer. Completion was delayed by the onset of World War I and suspension of merchant shipping services.

The front facade of Uplands included an extended porte-cochère for the main entrance, with two gardens including reflecting pools; the rear formed a small courtyard, flanked by the extended loggias. In 1915, Crocker added 20 acres (8.1 ha) of land adjoining the site to preserve his views. It featured 39 rooms including 12 bedrooms, and 12 baths. The mansion's interior has European fixtures including handmade marble fireplaces and mantlepieces, all originating from a single 16th-century Italian castle, Italian ironwork, Chinese porcelains, French and Flemish tapestries, and German woodcarving throughout. A 16th-century hand-carved ceiling from northern Italy graces the ballroom.

Crocker sold the property in 1942. It was occupied intermittently — most notably by Soviet Ambassador Andrei Gromyko and his delegation to the 1951 Japanese Peace conference for a week and a half — and the estate was subdivided, reducing the site to 10 acres (4.0 ha). The Crocker family re-acquired it in 1955 and Jennie Crocker Henderson, Templeton's sister, donated it to the trustees of the Crystal Springs School For Girls in 1956.

=== School origins ===
The school was conceived by Aylett B. (Borel) Cotton and his wife, Martha Jane (née Knecht) in 1948; Cotton was the grandson of both Aylett R. Cotton and Antoine Borel. The school was incorporated as the Crystal Springs School for Girls in 1952.

Head of school Richard Loveland was hired in 1973; at the time, the school was struggling with inconsistent enrollment and competition from other local private schools. In 1978, Loveland decided to begin admitting boys and the school was renamed to Crystal Springs and Uplands Schools; Crystal Springs remained the name for the girls school and Uplands was the new boys school.

=== Middle School Campus ===
On August 29, 2017, Crystal opened a middle school campus approximately 6 mi (9.7 km) south of the upper school campus, at 10 Davis Drive in the city of Belmont. The middle school campus consists of three buildings: a main academic building, a cafe/multipurpose/music building, and a gymnasium. Today, both the upper and middle school are one of the top middle and high schools in the nation - ranking 8th in the best college prep private schools in the nation.

== Athletics ==
The Crystal Springs Uplands School teams compete as the Gryphons in the West Bay Athletic League with other private schools in San Mateo and Santa Clara counties; for badminton and baseball, CSUS also competes with public schools in the Peninsula Athletic League.

=== Baseball ===
The 2005 and 2006 Crystal Springs Uplands baseball teams won North Coast Section Class B Championships. Following a North Coast Section record 27–3 victory in the 2006 championship game, the San Francisco Chronicle named Crystal Springs Uplands one of the top 20 high school teams in the San Francisco Bay area.

=== Cross country ===
The upper school girls' cross country teams have won seven Section titles (NCS Class 1A-1980, NCS Class A-1984, NCS Division V-2005 & 2006 and CCS Division V-2010, 2011, 2014 2022, 2023 and 2024). The 2005 team finished second at the California State Meet XC meet at Woodward Park. In 2022, senior Kaiya Brooks won the State Division V individual title, the school's first state title in any sport. The 2022 team also won their first team state title. They repeated as state champions in 2023.

The 2008 boys' XC team won their first section title at the Division V level. After two second-place finishes the next two seasons, the boys won CCS Division V titles in 2011, 2012 and 2014, 2015, 2016, 2017, 2018, 2019, 2021, 2022 and 2023. Nick Neely, class of '03, won the NCS individual cross country title in 2002. His winning time of 15:23 on the Hayward HS course remains the fastest time for all Division V runners on that course. He went on to finish second at the state meet behind three-time state winner Tim Nelson. Jake Kohn, class of '12, won the CCS individual title in 2011. Nick Holterman, class of '15, won the CCS individual cross country title in 2014. Nicky Medearis, class of '18, won the CCS individual title in 2017. He also finished 2nd in the Division V state meet race in 2017. Benjamin Bouie, class of '25, won the CCS individual title in 2023 and also finished 2nd at the state meet Division V race. The boys' team won the Division V state title in 2022 and 2023.

=== Track and field ===
The track and field program returned in 2002 after a two-decade hiatus. The team consisted of one athlete: shot putter Samantha Kuo. After a couple of years and a few additions, the girls' team won the NCS Class A meet in 2004 and 2005. Sam Kuo became the school's first state meet qualifier in 2005, with a fourth-place finish. That same year, the 400m relay team (Madeleine Evans, Sydney Blankers, Imani McElroy and Caroline Scanlan) qualified for the state meet with their third-place finish. Evans qualified as an individual with a third-place finish in the 400m.

== Notable alumni ==
- Sam Bankman-Fried, fraudster, entrepreneur, investor, former billionaire
- Polly Draper, actress, writer, producer; known for her role as Ellyn Warren in thirtysomething
- Jon Fisher, co-founder and chief executive officer of Bharosa, an Oracle company that produces the Oracle Adaptive Access Manager
- Will Harvey, Silicon Valley entrepreneur who achieved early fame as an Apple II game programmer at the age of 15 and created the game IMVU
- Patty Hearst, heiress kidnapped by the Symbionese Liberation Army in 1974
- Jack Herrick (Class of 1987), founder of wikiHow
- Reed Jobs, founder of Yosemite venture fund and son of Steve Jobs.
- Charlie Kubal, music producer, created 2010's Mashup Album of the Year, the notorious xx
- Greg Lindberg, a convicted American insurance fraudster convicted of bribery and conspiracy to commit wire fraud.
- Tyson Mao, competitive Rubik's Cube solver and co-founder of the World Cube Association; contestant on season two of the reality show Beauty and the Geek
- Kitty Margolis, jazz singer known for the album Heart and Soul: Live in San Francisco
- Daniel Naroditsky, chess grandmaster
- Verónica Pérez, soccer player, striker for Mexico women's national football team
- Josh Tenenbaum, MIT professor and researcher in cognitive science and AI
