= Andy W. Mattes =

German businessman (born 1963)

- Born: Andreas Walter Mattes c. 1963; Nuremberg, Germany
- Education: LMU Munich
- Spouse: Andrea Mattes
- Children: 3

Andreas Walter Mattes (born c. 1963) is a German businessman. He served as the president and chief executive of Diebold, an ATM and security company until December 2017. Mattes is currently the president and CEO of Coherent Inc., as well as member of the Board of Directors.

== Early life ==
Andy W. Mattes was born as Andreas Walter Mattes circa 1963 in Nuremberg, Germany. He was an exchange student in the United States while he was in high school. He graduated with an MBA from LMU Munich in 1985, where he was on a Studienstiftung scholarship.

== Career ==
Mattes worked his way up in managerial positions at Siemens from 1995 to 2005. He worked in China and Brazil, until he was promoted to Chief Executive Officer of Siemens Communications in Boca Raton, Florida. According to The Wall Street Journal, the company "became embroiled in a massive bribery scandal during his tenure".

Mattes served as the Senior Vice President and General Manager of Enterprise Services for the Americas at Hewlett-Packard. He subsequently served as the Senior Vice President of Global Strategic Partnerships at Violin Memory. Additionally, he served as the chairman of Mphasis. He also served on the boards of directors of Radvision.

Mattes has served as the president and chief executive of Diebold from 2013 until December 13, 2017. He succeeded Thomas W. Swidarski. His initial goal was to reduce costs. In 2014, he oversaw the acquisition of Cryptera, a Danish PIN pad company. A year later, in 2015, he oversaw the merger of Wincor Nixdorf, a German company, with Diebold. He described the merger as " adding $2.5 billion in revenues, 9,000 employees" and expanding their marketshare in Europe.

In April 2020, in the midst of the global COVID pandemic, Mattes was appointed to the position of president and CEO, and member of the Board of Directors for Coherent Inc.

== Personal life ==
Mattes has a wife, Andrea, and three children. He resides in Gates Mills, Ohio.
