= Peninsula Library System =

Library system in California, United States

Coordinates: 37°32′40″N 122°18′25″W

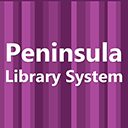
- Location: San Mateo County, California
- Established: 1971; 55 years ago
- Branches: 35

Access and use
- Population served: 718,451

Other information
- Director: Carol Frost
- Website: https://plsinfo.org

The Peninsula Library System (PLS) is a consortium of public and community college libraries in San Mateo County, California, United States, which serves the Peninsula region of the San Francisco Bay Area. The system has dozens of branches in local communities and at various area community colleges, a bookmobile, and automated book kiosks called Library-a-Go-Go.

== Member libraries ==
Peninsula Library System is a consortium of libraries, whose members are the branches of the San Mateo County Libraries, individual city libraries and their branches, and area community college libraries.

There are two branches in Burlingame: one main library, and one at Easton. The PLS includes the libraries at Cañada College, College of San Mateo, and Skyline College. There are four branches in Daly City: the John D. Daly branch on Hillside, the Bayshore branch, the Serramonte branch, and the Westlake branch. Menlo Park has both a main branch and a branch at Belle Haven. The Downtown Library, Schaberg Branch Library, and Redwood Shores Branch Library comprise the three library locations in the community of Redwood City. San Mateo has a main downtown location plus two minor branches, while South San Francisco has two self-titled branches, both a main branch and one on Grand Avenue. Pacifica has two branches at Sanchez and Sharp Park. The remaining cities—San Bruno, Atherton, Belmont, Brisbane, East Palo Alto, Foster City, Half Moon Bay, Millbrae, San Carlos, Woodside, and Portola Valley—have one location each.

Member system	Branch	Street address	City	ZIP	Telephone	Image
Burlingame Public Library	Burlingame Main	480 Primrose Road	Burlingame	94010	(650)558‑7400	Burlingame Main
Burlingame Public Library	Easton	1800 Easton Drive	Burlingame	94010	(650)340‑6180	Easton
Community College Libraries	Cañada College	4200 Farm Hill Boulevard	Redwood City	94061	(650)306‑3267	Cañada College Library
Community College Libraries	College of San Mateo	1700 West Hillsdale Boulevard	San Mateo	94402	(650)574‑6100	College of San Mateo Library
Community College Libraries	Skyline College	3300 College Drive	San Bruno	94066	(650)738‑4311	Skyline College Library (Building 5)
Daly City Public Library	Bayshore	460 Martin Street	Daly City	94014	(650)991‑8074	
Daly City Public Library	John Daly	134 Hillside Boulevard	Daly City	94014	(650)991‑8073	
Daly City Public Library	Serramonte Main	40 Wembley Drive	Daly City	94015	(650)991‑8023	
Daly City Public Library	Westlake	275 Southgate Avenue	Daly City	94015	(650)991‑8071	
Menlo Park Library	Menlo Park	800 Alma Street	Menlo Park	94025	(650)330‑2500	Menlo Park
Menlo Park Library	Belle Haven	413 Ivy Drive	Menlo Park	94025	(650)330‑2540	
Redwood City Public Library	Downtown	1044 Middlefield Road	Redwood City	94063	(650)780‑7018	Redwood City Downtown Library
Redwood City Public Library	Redwood Shores	399 Marine Parkway	Redwood City	94065	(650)780‑5740	
Redwood City Public Library	Schaberg	2140 Euclid Avenue	Redwood City	94061	(650)780‑7010	Schaberg Branch
San Bruno Public Library	San Bruno	701 Angus Avenue West	San Bruno	94066	(650)616‑7078	
San Mateo City Library	Hillsdale	205 West Hillsdale Boulevard	San Mateo	94403	(650)522‑7880	Hillsdale Branch
San Mateo City Library	San Mateo Main	55 West 3rd Avenue	San Mateo	94402	(650)522‑7800	San Mateo Main
San Mateo City Library	Marina	1530 Susan Court	San Mateo	94403	(650)522‑7890	San Mateo - Marina
San Mateo County Libraries	Atherton	2 Dinkelspiel Station Lane	Atherton	94027	(650)328‑2422	
San Mateo County Libraries	Belmont	1110 Alameda de las Pulgas	Belmont	94002	(650)591‑8286	Belmont Public Library
San Mateo County Libraries	Bookmobile	620 Correas Street	Half Moon Bay	94019	(650)726‑2316	
San Mateo County Libraries	Brisbane	250 Visitacion Avenue	Brisbane	94005	(415)467‑2060	
San Mateo County Libraries	East Palo Alto	2415 University Avenue	East Palo Alto	94303	(650)321‑7712	
San Mateo County Libraries	Foster City	1000 East Hillsdale Boulevard	Foster City	94404	(650)574‑4842	
San Mateo County Libraries	Half Moon Bay	620 Correas Street	Half Moon Bay	94019	(650)726‑2316	
San Mateo County Libraries	Millbrae	1 Library Avenue	Millbrae	94030	(650)697‑7607	
San Mateo County Libraries	North Fair Oaks	2510 Middlefield Road	Redwood City	94063	650-670-8778	
San Mateo County Libraries	Pacifica – Sanchez	1111 Terra Nova Boulevard	Pacifica	94044	(650)359-3397	Pacifica-Sanchez Library
San Mateo County Libraries	Pacifica – Sharp Park	104 Hilton Way	Pacifica	94044	(650)355‑5196	Pacifica-Sharp Park Library
San Mateo County Libraries	Portola Valley	765 Portola Road	Portola Valley	94028	(650)851‑0560	Portola Valley
San Mateo County Libraries	San Carlos	610 Elm Street	San Carlos	94070	(650)591‑0341	
San Mateo County Libraries	Woodside	3140 Woodside Road	Woodside	94062	(650)851‑0147	Woodside Library
South San Francisco Public Library	Grand Avenue	306 Walnut Avenue	South San Francisco	94080	(650)877‑8530	South SF Grand
South San Francisco Public Library	South San Francisco Main	901 Civic Campus Way	South San Francisco	94080	(650)829‑3860	South SF Main

== See also ==
- Santa Clara County Library District
- San Francisco Public Library
