= South San Francisco Public Library =

Library in South San Francisco, California, United States

South San Francisco Library

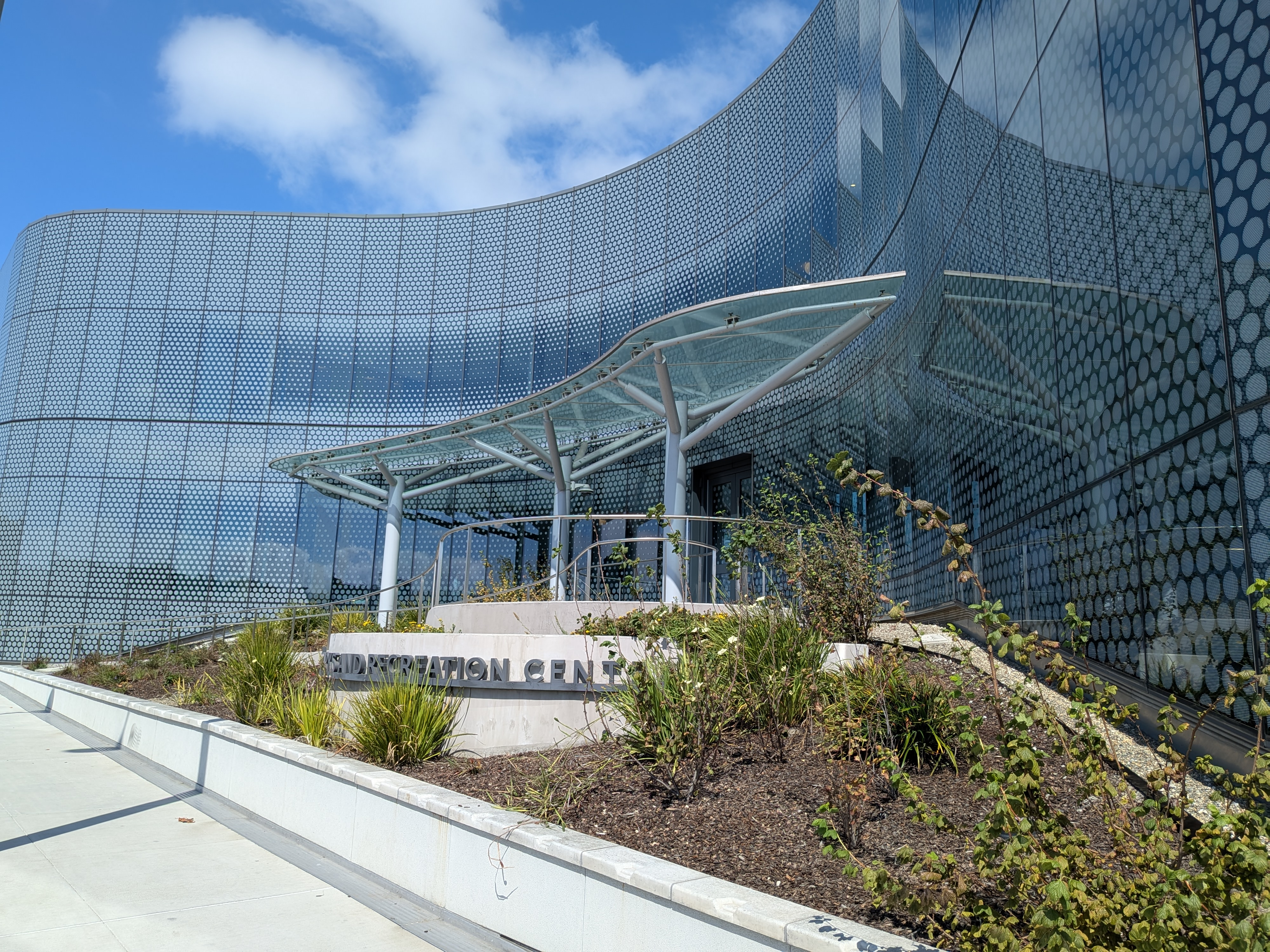
- Entrance to the Main library
- 37°39′09″N 122°26′12″W
- Location: South San Francisco, California, United States
- Type: Public library
- Established: July 20, 1914; 112 years ago
- Branches: 2

Access and use
- Access requirements: Free. Current ID and proof of residential address in California to check out items.

Other information
- Budget: US$8,505,041
- Employees: 46
- Website: www.ssf.net/departments/library

The South San Francisco Public Library is located in South San Francisco, California. It is an independent city library and part of the Peninsula Library System, a consortium of city, county, and community college libraries in San Mateo County. The library holds approximately 166,000 volumes and has 29,000 borrowers. In the fiscal year 2007–2008, the library circulated 687,000 items. The library provides access to homebound delivery services, numerous children's programs, a literacy program, a community learning center, 77 public computers, and free Wi-Fi.

For the fiscal year 2023-2024, the budget was $8.5 million, and had 46 employees.

== History ==
In 1914, local teacher Rue Clifford rode through town on horseback collecting petition signatures in support of creating a local public library. In 1916, Andrew Carnegie provided funding and building plans for construction of the Grand Avenue library. In 1966, the new city library on West Orange Avenue opened to the public. The Grand Avenue library became the city's branch library. In 1998, the Community Learning Center, a new service of the library and collaborating agencies serving youth and adults, opened.

In 2015, voters approved a sales tax measure to fund construction of a new library building. The previous Main Library on Orange Avenue closed in the summer of 2023 before the new combined main library and parks and recreation center on Civic Campus Way opened to the public in October 2023.

== Locations ==
The library has three locations:

Main Library	901 Civic Campus Way
Grand Avenue Branch	306 Walnut Avenue (37.656°N 122.414°W)
Community Learning Center	520 Tamarack Lane

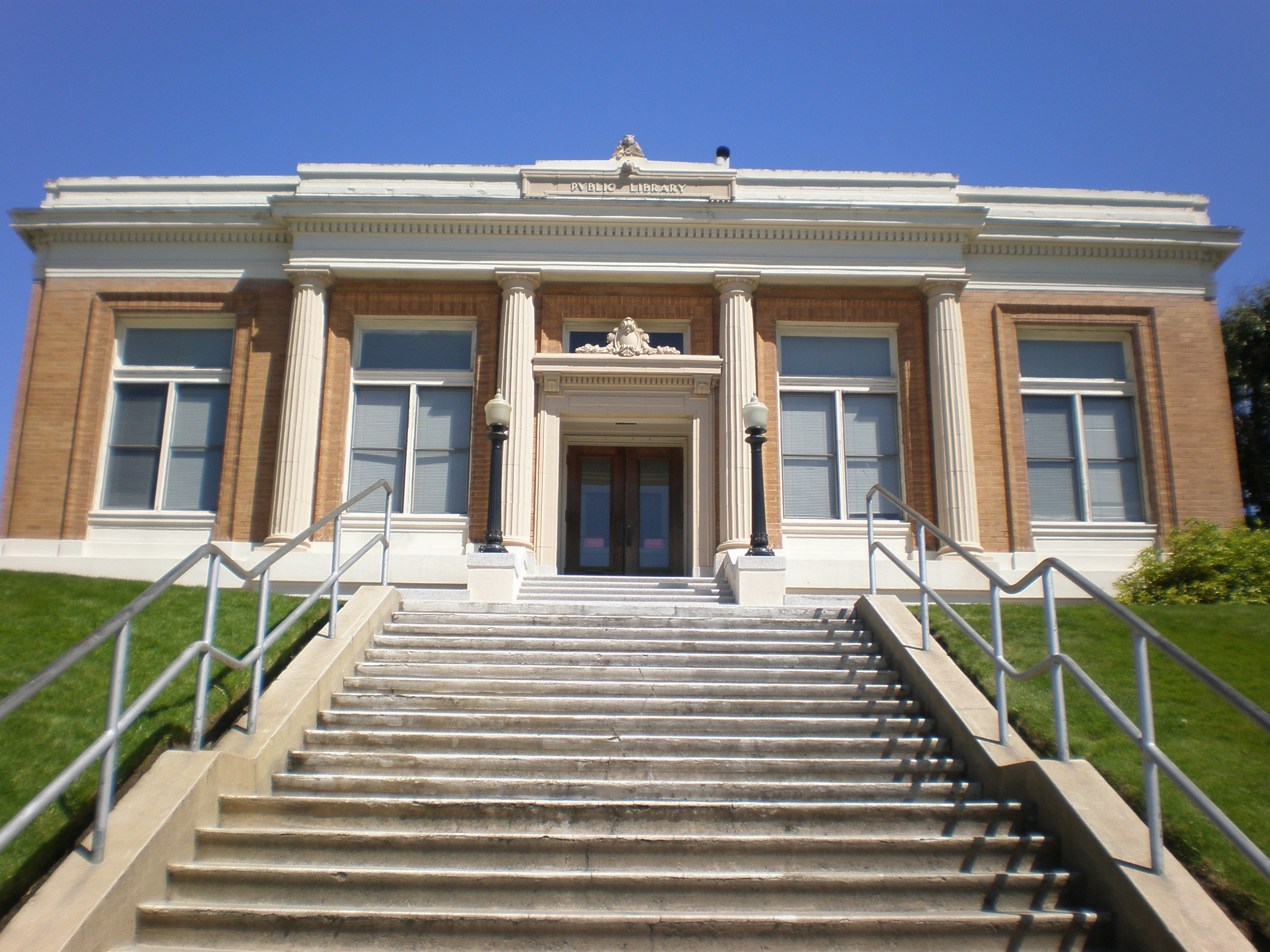
The Grand Avenue branch, 2008

== Collections ==
The library offers current, high-demand materials for all ages in a variety of formats. The Grand Avenue branch has a sizable Spanish-language collection. The Main library features the Figoni Opera Collection, the largest collection of opera CDs and DVDs in Northern California.

Visitors may also access electronic resources including GALE databases, online, and e-book services. The library provides an online reference service 24 hours a day through the AskNow service.

== Children and Teen Services ==
The Children's and Teen Services department provides collections, programs, and services for children from babies to young adults. It offers story times for infants, toddlers, preschoolers, families, and story times in Spanish. Seasonal and afterschool programming is offered throughout the school year. The department also has extensive summer programs, including the Summer Reading Club, Teen Reading Club, and a program that matches middle and high school students with elementary school students who need help practicing reading. The After School and Summer Volunteer programs allow teens to fulfill community service requirements for their schools or service clubs. The department provides homework help for students from 4th grade through college introduction through Tutor.com. It also offers Tumblebooks, an online collection of picture books and other educational activities.

== Project Read ==
Project Read is a free service in the library's literacy program for English-speaking adults who want to improve their reading and writing ability. It offers a wide variety of programs including Families for Literacy story time, a Computer Learning Lab where learners can use programs to help with reading, spelling, and phonics, as well as learning the basics of computers, typing, and the internet; and Learning Wheels, a mobile preschool classroom.

== Community Learning Center ==
The Community Learning Center serves to meet the educational needs of South San Francisco's multicultural residents. Its programs include English Language Classes, Computer Instruction, Homework Assistance, Activities for Children, Native Language Literacy Classes (Spanish), Kindergarten Preparation, Job Training, Parent Education, and Civic Engagement.

== History room ==
The South San Francisco History Room is devoted to the historical development and current events of South San Francisco. The History Room was established in 1967 and is located in the basement of the Grand Ave. Library. The collection contains approximately 2000 photographs and slides from the 1850s to the present. The collection also contains local school photographs and yearbooks from 1917 to present. There are also general genealogical reference materials, city directories, an historic building survey (1986), Sanborn maps (1910 and 1929), South San Francisco zoning and area maps (1840s to present), and oral history tapes.

== See also ==
- San Mateo County Libraries
- San Francisco Public Library
- Interlibrary loan
