= WBAR =

Student radio station at Barnard College

Coordinates: 40°48′31″N 73°57′50″W

- New York, New York; United States
- Frequency: 87.9 MHz
- Branding: WBAR, Barnard College Radio

Programming
- Format: College radio

Ownership
- Owner: Barnard College

History
- First air date: April 1, 1993
- Call sign meaning: W B A Rnard College Radio

Links
- Webcast: WBAR Stream
- Website: WBAR.org

WBAR is the campus radio station of Barnard College in New York City. Currently streaming online-only, WBAR was developed as a freeform alternative to WKCR-FM on the Columbia University campus. In addition to an eclectic array of shows, WBAR hosts several live concerts per year in Morningside Heights, including the WBAR-B-Q, a free, all-ages, day-long showcase of bands and food, as well as a Winter Formal concert event in December. Recent performers have included Palehound, Japanese Breakfast, Sammus, Ravyn Lenae, and more.

== History ==
WBAR launched in the early 1990s, and was formerly located in Barnard College's McIntosh Hall before it was moved by the administration to the basement of Sulzberger Hall in the spring of 2007, pending demolition of McIntosh.

WBAR used to host Radiothons, a fund-raising week-long series of live shows, interviews and give-aways, held in the WBAR studio. Alcohol was served. Dirty Projectors headlined 2005's Radiothon closing show, supported by Akron/Family, Other Passengers, R. Stevie Moore and The Shot Heard Round the World. The show was held at The West End Basement.

WBAR and NYU also held a Battle of the Bands on October 25, 2002.

== Notable shows ==
WBAR has a history of putting on shows that feature up-and-coming live acts, as well as on-campus talent. Among past performers include Ari Up, Bikini Kill, and Daniel Johnston.

== WBAR-B-Q ==
WBAR puts on its annual WBAR-B-Q each April. Held outdoors on Barnard College's Lehman Lawn, the day-long show is free, all-ages and open to the public. Food is usually available, and in the past, alcohol has been served. Past line-ups have included Vampire Weekend, Liturgy, Cold Cave and Real Estate.

2006: Fixations, YACHT, E*Rock, Bobby Birdman, King Kong Ding Dong, O'Death, Lucky Dragons, Midnight Hours, Man Man.
2007: ONEIDA, Dark Meat, caUSE co-MOTION!, Public Record, Soiled Mattress & the Springs, Vampire Weekend, Nat Baldwin & Sam Rosen, The Shot Heard Round the World, Yan Yan.
2008: Wizards of the Coast, Bear, Food Will Win the War, Liturgy, Thee Yetis, Les Sans Culottes, MegaFaun, Takka Takka, Tickley Feather, Crystal Stilts, Cause Co-Motion, Awesome Color, The Skaters, Videohippos, Japanther.
2009: Fitz, Jerome Ellis, Acrylics, Liturgy, Metalux, Xeno & Oaklander, Free Blood, PackFM, Soft Circle, Gang Gang Dance.
2010: Cold Cave, Blues Control, Liturgy, Burning Star Core, Jana Hunter, Twin Stumps, U.S. Girls, Think About Life, Prince Rama Of Ayodhya, Old Men.
2011: Real Estate, Blondes, The Crystal Ark, Arp, Laurel Halo, Big Troubles, Grooms, Beige, Julianna Barwick.
2012: Dam Funk, Bush Tetras, Widowspeak, Mike Slott, Pete Swanson (ex-Yellow Swans), Forma, Archie Pelago, Night Birds, Midtown Dickens

== Notable staff ==
- Chris Baio, former WBAR College Rock Music Director and current bassist of Vampire Weekend
- Woodrow 'Bo' Boyer, Program Director and morning drive personality who placed the station in the Arbitron Ratings for the first time in decades.
- Shirley Braha, creator of New York Noise
- R. Luke DuBois, experimental composer, artist, and member of the Freight Elevator Quartet. WBAR Technical Director 1995-1997.
- Joseph Gordon-Levitt, actor who attended Columbia University School of General Studies
- Charlie Kubal, music producer, created 2010's Mashup Album of the Year the notorious xx
- Shana Ting Lipton, former WBAR DJ host of 'The Highrise' (1993), later pop culture journalist LA Times
- Amy Phillips, News Editor at Pitchfork Media
- Adam Shore, First WBAR Music Director and former General Manager of Vice Records
- Gideon Yago, MTV News and CBS News correspondent
