= Atherton, California =

Town in San Mateo County, California

- Town
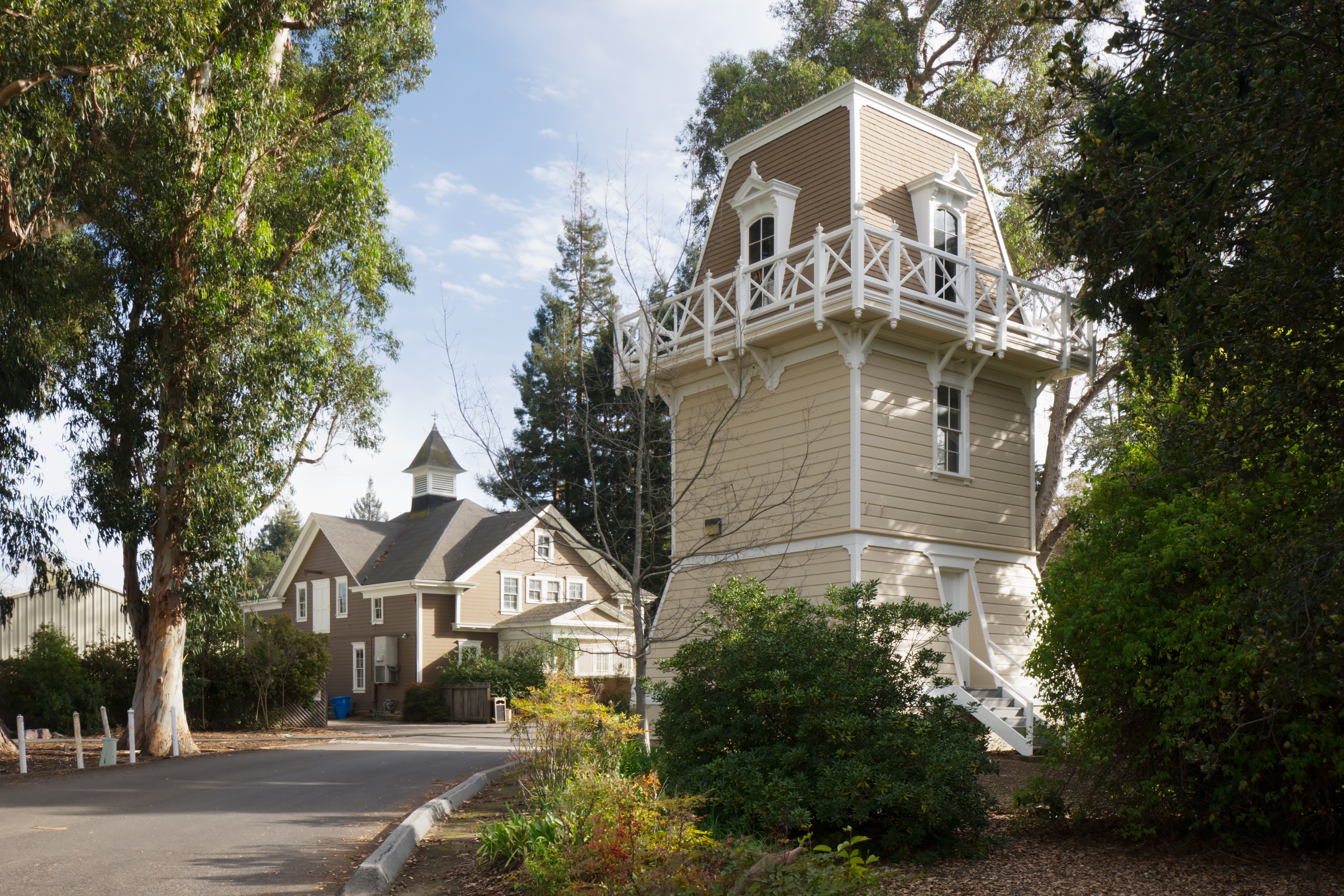
- Holbrook-Palmer Park

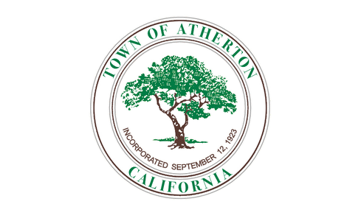
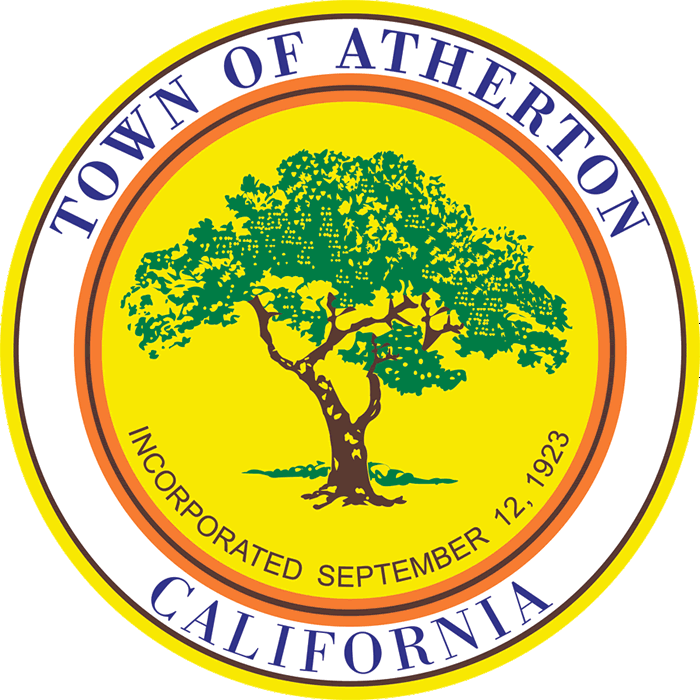
- Flag Seal
- Interactive map of Atherton, California
- Location in the United States Atherton (the United States)
- Coordinates: 37°27′31″N 122°12′0″W
- Country: United States
- State: California
- County: San Mateo
- Incorporated: September 12, 1923
- Named for: Faxon Dean Atherton

Government
  - City council: Mayor Rick DeGolia; Vice Mayor Bill Widmer; Elizabeth Lewis; Robert Polito; Diana Hawkins Manuelian
  - Assemblymember: Marc Berman (D) (23rd)
  - State Senator: Josh Becker (D) (13th)
  - U.S. Rep.: Sam Liccardo (D) (16th)

Area
  - Total: 5.05 sq mi (13.07 km^{2})
  - Land: 5.02 sq mi (12.99 km^{2})
  - Water: 0.031 sq mi (0.08 km^{2}) 0.63%
- Elevation: 59 ft (18 m)

Population (2020)
  - Total: 7,188
  - Density: 1,433.0/sq mi (553.28/km^{2})
- Time zone: UTC−8 (Pacific)
  - Summer (DST): UTC−7 (PDT)
- ZIP Code: 94027
- Area code: 650
- FIPS code: 06-03092
- GNIS feature IDs: 1657960, 2411651
- Website: athertonca.gov

Atherton (/ˈæθərtən/ ATH-ər-tən) is an incorporated town in San Mateo County, California, United States. A Silicon Valley bedroom community, Its population was 6,823 as of July 2023 estimates.

The town has historically been known for its concentration of high income earners. Atherton had the highest per capita income among American towns (populations between 2,500 and 9,999) in both 1990 and 2019. It regularly ranks as having the highest cost of living in the United States. The town's zip code, 94027, had the highest median home prices in America from 2017 to 2024, in 2023 it was at $7.95 million. Median home price in the area climbed to $9.93 million in 2026.

== History ==
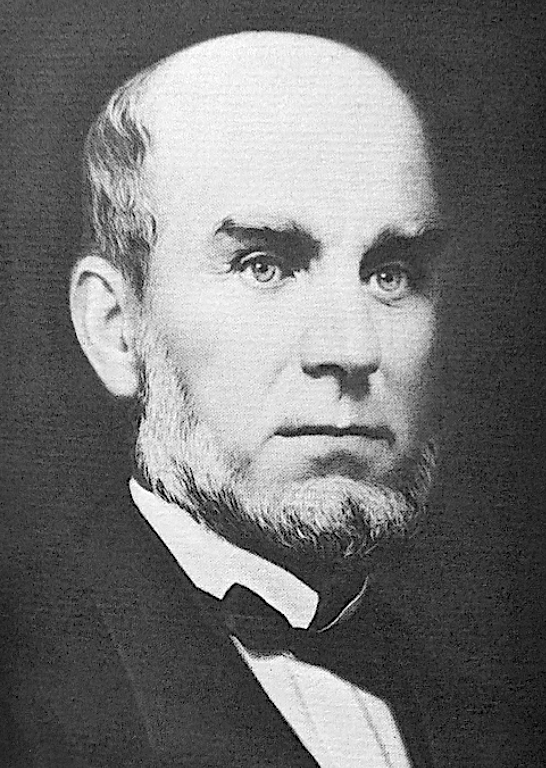
Faxon Dean Atherton

The entire area was originally part of the Rancho de las Pulgas. During the 1860s, Atherton was known as Fair Oaks. In 1923, Menlo Park wanted to incorporate its lands to include Fair Oaks, but the Fair Oaks property owners chose to incorporate separately. The name Fair Oaks was already in use, so the property owners decided to rename the town in honor of Faxon Dean Atherton, a former 19th century landowner on the south peninsula.

=== Lawsuit against the electrification of Caltrain ===
The town has been involved in lawsuits to block or delay the introduction of California High-Speed Rail due to perceived negative outcomes for Atherton residents. Atherton was an early and vocal opponent of the electrification of the U.S. commuter railroad Caltrain, which serves cities in the San Francisco Peninsula and Silicon Valley. Residents opposed electrification and the proposed high-speed rail route because the overhead electrical lines would require tree removal and the town could potentially be divided by the closing of the two grade crossings at Fair Oaks Lane and Watkins Avenue.

In February 2015, shortly after the project received environmental clearance from the state, Atherton sued Caltrain, alleging the agency's environmental impact review was inadequate and that its collaboration with the CHSRA should be further vetted. In July 2015, the suit proceeded after Caltrain's request to the Surface Transportation Board to exempt it from California Environmental Quality Act (CEQA) guidelines was denied. Atherton reiterated its opposition to electrification on the basis that overhead wires would require removing a significant number of heritage trees, and city representatives asserted that "newer, cleaner, more efficient diesel trains" should supplant plans for "century-old catenary electrical line technology." Atherton mayor Rick De Golia was quoted as saying "Caltrain is locked into an old technology and 20th century thinking." After Caltrain issued infrastructure and rolling stock contracts in July 2016, Atherton representatives did not file a temporary restraining order to halt those contracts, preferring to let the suit proceed to a hearing. In September 2016, Contra Costa County Superior Court Judge Barry Goode sided with Caltrain, ruling that the electrification project did not hinge on the high-speed rail project's success, and was thus independent from the latter.

Atherton sued CHSRA again in December 2016, stating that using bond money intended for high-speed rail for CalMod was a material change in usage and therefore was unconstitutional because such a change would require voter approval first. In response, the California Legislature allowed the funding to be redirected by passing Assembly Bill No. 1889, which had been championed by Assembly member Kevin Mullin in 2015. Mullin noted "this entire Caltrain corridor is the epicenter of the innovation economy and it's a job creation and economic engine. This electrification project, I would argue, is monumental with regard to dealing with [increased traffic and environmental impacts] effectively and efficiently."

The Caltrain station closed in 2020.

=== Land use and housing ===
As of 2020, Atherton was ranked as the American city with the highest average income according to data from Bloomberg. According to the San Francisco Chronicle, "the town's ascendance stems largely from its single-family zoning, 1-acre-minimum lot sizes, flat land, streamlined permits and changing buyer demographics — which have translated into soaring house sizes and skyrocketing prices." There is no commercial zoning in the town, thus there are no restaurants, shops or grocery stores. Although city codes specify regulations for sidewalk maintenance, many streets do not have sidewalks.

In 2022, the town blocked a proposal to build 131 multifamily housing units in the town in response to strong criticism. Many of the town's residents, including basketball player Steph Curry, strongly opposed proposals to permit more housing construction. Advocates for the construction of additional homes have criticized Atherton as being a NIMBY town. In the same year, California Governor Gavin Newsom singled out Atherton in a speech for its restrictive housing policies. With the passage of SB 9 in 2021, zoning regulations that limit how many units can be built on a property were nullified, but enforcement actions did not begin until 2023.

In February 2023, responding to state legislative deadlines, the Atherton City Council approved a housing plan with 348 mixed-income housing units. Under California law, the units must be built over the next eight years, and the city must reserve 148 units for occupancy by persons classified as having "very low income" or "low income", 56 units for "moderate income" individuals, and 144 units for "above moderate income" individuals.

In its 2002 plan, Atherton stated a land-use goal to "preserve the Town's character as a scenic, rural, thickly wooded residential area with abundant open space", but its current general plan as of 2024 does not use this language.

== Geography ==
According to the United States Census Bureau, the town has a total area of 5.0 square miles (13 km^{2}), of which 5.0 square miles (13 km^{2}) is land and 0.03 square miles (0.078 km^{2}), comprising 0.63%, is water.

Atherton lies two miles (3.2 km) southeast of Redwood City, and 18 miles (29 km) northwest of San Jose. The town is considered to be part of the San Francisco metropolitan area.

== Demographics ==
Historical population
Census	Pop.	Note	%±
1930	1,324		—
1940	1,908		44.1%
1950	3,630		90.3%
1960	7,717		112.6%
1970	8,085		4.8%
1980	7,797		−3.6%
1990	7,163		−8.1%
2000	7,194		0.4%
2010	6,914		−3.9%
2020	7,188		4.0%
U.S. Decennial Census; 1860–1870 1880-1890; 1900 1910 1920; 1930 1940 1950; 1960 1970 1980; 1990 2000 2010

=== Racial and ethnic composition ===
Atherton town, California – Racial and ethnic composition Note: the US Census treats Hispanic/Latino as an ethnic category. This table excludes Latinos from the racial categories and assigns them to a separate category. Hispanics/Latinos may be of any race.
Race / Ethnicity (NH = Non-Hispanic)	Pop 2000	Pop 2010	Pop 2020	% 2000	% 2010	% 2020
White alone (NH)	6,022	5,405	4,731	83.71%	78.17%	65.82%
Black or African American alone (NH)	50	72	94	0.70%	1.04%	1.31%
Native American or Alaska Native alone (NH)	10	5	11	0.14%	0.07%	0.15%
Asian alone (NH)	704	910	1,404	9.79%	13.16%	19.53%
Native Hawaiian or Pacific Islander alone (NH)	30	45	45	0.42%	0.65%	0.63%
Other race alone (NH)	18	18	21	0.25%	0.26%	0.29%
Mixed race or Multiracial (NH)	160	191	398	2.22%	2.76%	5.54%
Hispanic or Latino (any race)	200	268	484	2.78%	3.88%	6.73%
Total	7,194	6,914	7,188	100.00%	100.00%	100.00%

=== 2020 census ===
As of the 2020 census, Atherton had a population of 7,188. The population density was 1,424.3 inhabitants per square mile (549.9/km^{2}). The median age was 48.4 years. 19.0% of residents were under the age of 18 and 25.7% of residents were 65 years of age or older. For every 100 females there were 94.8 males, and for every 100 females age 18 and over there were 90.0 males age 18 and over.

100.0% of residents lived in urban areas, while 0.0% lived in rural areas.

There were 2,252 households in Atherton, of which 32.6% had children under the age of 18 living in them. Of all households, 70.6% were married-couple households, 9.5% were households with a male householder and no spouse or partner present, and 17.9% were households with a female householder and no spouse or partner present. About 14.7% of all households were made up of individuals and 9.8% had someone living alone who was 65 years of age or older. The average household size was 2.94.

There were 2,526 housing units, of which 10.8% were vacant. Of occupied housing units, 89.2% were owner-occupied and 10.8% were renter-occupied. The homeowner vacancy rate was 1.7% and the rental vacancy rate was 3.7%.

Racial composition as of the 2020 census
Race	Number	Percent
White	4,844	67.4%
Black or African American	100	1.4%
American Indian and Alaska Native	14	0.2%
Asian	1,411	19.6%
Native Hawaiian and Other Pacific Islander	45	0.6%
Some other race	150	2.1%
Two or more races	624	8.7%

=== 2010 census ===
At the 2010 census Atherton had a population of 6,914. The population density was 1,369.5 inhabitants per square mile (528.8/km^{2}). The racial makeup of Atherton was:

- 5,565 (80.5%) White
- 911 (13.2%) Asian
- 216 (3.1%) from two or more races.
- 95 (1.4%) from other races
- 75 (1.1%) African American
- 45 (0.7%) Pacific Islander
- 7 (0.1%) Native American

There were 268 residents of Hispanic or Latino origin, or of any race (3.9%).

The census reported that 6,529 people (94.4% of the population) lived in households, 385 (5.6%) lived in non-institutionalized group quarters, and no one was institutionalized.

There were 2,330 households, 787 (33.8%) had children under the age of 18 living in them, 1,755 (75.3%) were opposite-sex married couples living together, 109 (4.7%) had a female householder with no husband present, 48 (2.1%) had a male householder with no wife present. There were 34 (1.5%) unmarried opposite-sex partnerships, and 15 (0.6%) same-sex married couples or partnerships. 321 households (13.8%) were one person and 178 (7.6%) had someone living alone who was 65 or older. The average household size was 2.80. There were 1,912 families (82.1% of households); the average family size was 3.03.

The age distribution was 1,543 people (22.3%) under the age of 18, 579 people (8.4%) aged 18 to 24, 966 people (14.0%) aged 25 to 44, 2,264 people (32.7%) aged 45 to 64, and 1,562 people (22.6%) who were 65 or older. The median age was 48.2 years. For every 100 females, there were 96.6 males. For every 100 women age 18 and over, there were 95.3 men.

The median household income was in excess of $250,000, the highest of any place in the United States. The per capita income for the town was $128,816. About 2.9% of families and 5.1% of the population were below the poverty line, including 5.6% of those under age 18 and 5.4% of those age 65 or over.

There were 2,530 housing units at an average density of 501.1 per square mile, of the occupied units 2,116 (90.8%) were owner-occupied and 214 (9.2%) were rented. The homeowner vacancy rate was 1.6%; the rental vacancy rate was 3.9%. 5,921 people (85.6% of the population) lived in owner-occupied housing units and 608 people (8.8%) lived in rental housing units.

=== Income and poverty ===
Median income for a household was over $250,000. Males had a median income $102,192 versus $53,882 for females. About 1.1% of families and 2.6% of the population were below the poverty line, including 0.5% of those under the age of 18 and 1.1% of those 65 years or over.

=== Housing market ===
Forbes ranked Atherton as second on its list of America's Most Expensive ZIP Codes in 2010, listing median house price as over $2,000,000.

Property Shark ranked Atherton first for the fourth year in a row as the most expensive ZIP code in the United States in 2022, with the median home price at $7,900,000.

== Arts and culture ==
There are a number of active community organizations: the Atherton Heritage Association, the Atherton Arts Committee, the Atherton Tree Committee, the Friends of the Atherton Community Library, the Holbrook-Palmer Park Foundation, the Atherton Dames, the Police Task Force, and the Atherton Civic Interest League. There are also home owners' associations in various neighborhoods. The Menlo Circus Club is a private club with tennis, swimming, stables and a riding ring located within the town.

There are also several tracts of contemporary Eichler homes, most notably in the Lindenwood neighborhood in the northeast part of the town.

The Holbrook-Palmer Estate, was once an active rural estate and gentleman's farm. The Holbrook-Palmer Estate was donated to the city of Atherton in 1958 and now serves as a 22-acre public park (8.9 ha) and is listed on the National Register of Historic Places for the architecture.

The city is served by the Atherton Public Library of the San Mateo County Libraries, a member of the Peninsula Library System.

== Government ==
In the California State Legislature, Atherton is in the 13th senatorial district, represented by Democrat Josh Becker, and is split between the 21st Assembly district, represented by Democrat Diane Papan and the 23rd Assembly district, represented by Democrat Marc Berman. In the United States House of Representatives, Atherton is in California's 16th congressional district, represented by Democrat Sam Liccardo.

=== Politics ===
According to the California Secretary of State, as of March 11, 2022, Atherton has 5,063 registered voters. Of those, 2,192 (43.2%) are registered Democrats, 1,247 (24.6%) are registered Republicans and 1,317 (26%) have declined to state a political party.

== Education ==
Atherton does not operate its own public school system. Instead, its students attend schools in neighboring districts. Encinal, Las Lomitas, and Laurel are elementary schools; Selby Lane serves both elementary and middle grades. Menlo-Atherton is the local public high school. Selby Lane belongs to the Redwood City School District, Menlo-Atherton to the Sequoia Union High School District, Las Lomitas to the Las Lomitas Elementary School District, and Encinal and Laurel to the Menlo Park City School District.

The town also has the private school Sacred Heart which offers elementary through high school, while Menlo School serves middle and high school. Atherton is also home to Menlo College, a private four-year institution.

== Notable people ==
- Paul Allen, Microsoft co-founder.
- Marc Andreessen, co-founder of Netscape and general partner at Andreessen Horowitz.
- Mohamed Atalla, Egyptian-American engineer, inventor of MOSFET transistor, founder of Atalla Corporation
- Gertrude Atherton, American author
- Faxon Atherton, namesake of Atherton, California
- CiCi Bellis, tennis player
- Becca Bloom, entrepreneur, socialite, and social media personality
- Lindsey Buckingham, of Fleetwood Mac
- Nick Clegg, Meta Platforms executive and former Deputy Prime Minister of the United Kingdom, and his wife, Miriam González Durántez, a lawyer
- Ty Cobb, Hall of Fame Major League Baseball player
- Stephen Curry and Ayesha Curry, NBA star and actress
- Anirudh Devgan, CEO of Cadence Design Systems
- Timothy C. Draper, venture capitalist and founder of Draper Fisher Jurvetson
- Clay Dreslough, game designer, raised in Atherton
- Douglas Engelbart, computer engineer and inventor of the computer mouse
- Anna Eshoo, former U.S. representative
- Drew Fuller, actor, known for role on Charmed and Army Wives
- Bill Gurley, venture capitalist; general partner at Benchmark.
- Elizabeth Holmes, former biotechnology entrepreneur convicted of fraud.
- Ben Horowitz, co-founder of Andreessen Horowitz.
- Ron Johnson, former senior executive at Apple
- Guy Kawasaki, venture capitalist
- Bobbie Kelsey, Stanford University women's basketball assistant coach
- Andy Kessler, author of books on business, technology, and the health field
- Jan Koum, co-founder of WhatsApp
- Robby Krieger, musician, former guitarist of The Doors
- Charlie Kubal, music producer, created 2010's Mashup Album of the Year, the notorious xx, grew up in Atherton
- Douglas Leone (born 1957), billionaire venture capitalist
- Andy W. Mattes, CEO of Diebold.
- Sandy Mayer (born 1952), tennis player
- Willie Mays, Hall of Fame Major League Baseball player
- Bill McDermott, CEO of ServiceNow
- Harden M. McConnell (1927–2014), physical chemist
- Rajeev Motwani, professor, computer science, Stanford University
- Farzad Nazem, former chief technology officer of Yahoo! and one of its longest-serving executives, now an angel investor
- Chamath Palihapitiya, CEO of Social Capital, and board member of the Golden State Warriors.
- J. B. Pritzker, Governor of Illinois and co-founder of the Pritzker Group
- Tom Proulx, co-founder of Intuit.
- Vivek Ranadive, chairman, CEO and founder of TIBCO Software
- Jerry Rice, Hall of Fame football player
- George R. Roberts, co-founder of Kohlberg Kravis Roberts.
- Ted Robinson, sports broadcaster and former San Francisco 49ers play-by-play announcer
- Maureen Kennedy Salaman, author and proponent of alternative medicine
- James R. Scapa, co-founder, chairman and CEO of Altair Engineering
- Eric Schmidt, former executive chairman and CEO of Google
- Charles R. Schwab, founder and CEO of the Charles Schwab Corporation
- Komal Shah, art collector, philanthropist, and businessperson
- Shirley Temple, child movie star and diplomat
- Y.A. Tittle, 49ers & Giants QB, NFL HOFer, resident until his death in 2017
- Bob Weir, of the Grateful Dead and Ratdog, raised in Atherton
- Steve Westly, former State Controller of California, major Democratic Party fundraiser, and venture capitalist.
- Meg Whitman, diplomat, former president and CEO of Hewlett-Packard, former CEO of eBay
- Andrew Wilson, CEO of Electronic Arts (EA)
- Dennis Woodside, president of Impossible Foods, former COO of Dropbox
- Quadeca, Singer-Songwriter/YouTuber grew up in Atherton

== See also ==
- The Almanac
