= Wait what =

American music producer

wait what
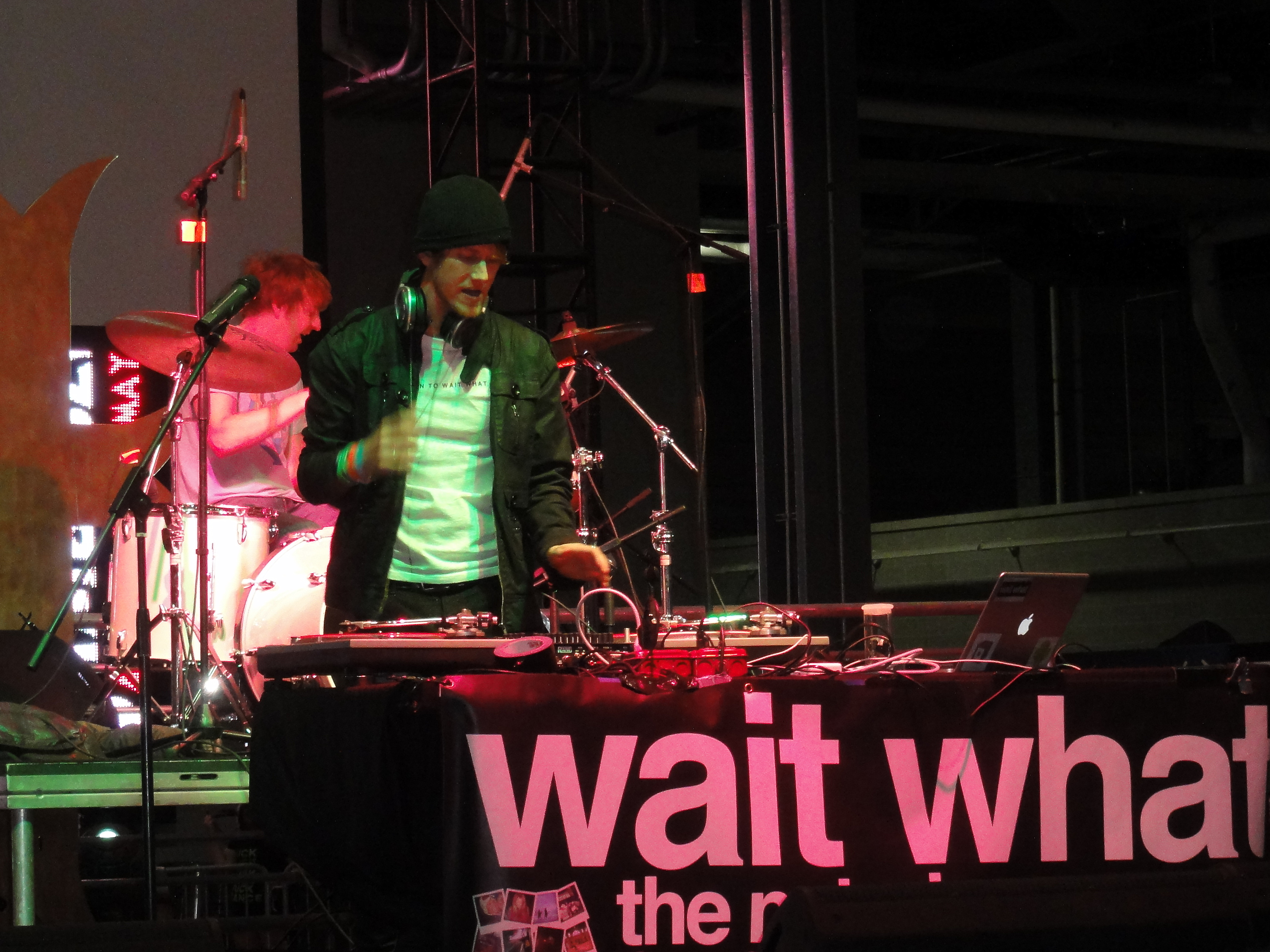
- Charlie Kubal (wait what) in 2011

Background information
- Born: Charlie Kubal; June 27, 1985 (age 41)
- Origin: Atherton, California, United States
- Genres: Mashup; experimental
- Occupation: Mashup artist
- Instrument: Laptop
- Years active: 2010–present
- Website: Official website

Charlie Kubal, better known by his stage name wait what, is a San Francisco music producer specializing in mashups, most notable for his creation of the notorious xx. The album paired the music of The Notorious B.I.G. with the debut album of The xx and was named "the best mashup album of 2010"by The Guardian. He has released three albums and has performed with artists including Lil Wayne, Wiz Khalifa, Mötley Crüe, and Taking Back Sunday.

== Early life ==
Born in Palo Alto, California, Kubal began DJing at age 15 while attending Crystal Springs Uplands School in a suburb outside San Francisco, California, both playing in the band Jubala and DJing parties. He began producing music when he moved to New York to attend Columbia University in 2004. While studying English literature and psychology there, he recorded and produced hip hop from his dorm room, and hosted a hip hop show on WBAR college radio. Later he took courses under Brad Garton and Terry Pender at the Computer Music Center with other Columbia musicians, including Reni Lane. Given 24-hour access to the 125th St. studio, he created his first sample-based tracks in 2008 in Digital Performer and later in Logic Pro.

== The notorious xx ==
Upon graduating in 2008, Kubal moved back to San Francisco, where he was employed at Google on the Calendar team and played a handful of local shows before beginning work on the notorious xx in early 2010. He created the record over a period of three weeks in January 2010 while he was traveling, creating it on flights and airports while in Williamstown, Aspen, New Orleans, Zurich, London, Denver, Chicago and finally in his San Francisco apartment.

Following its release on March 25, 2010, the album attracted the attention of New York Magazine, Prefix Magazine, Sputnik, and The Guardian. Within ten days of the album's release, several of the tracks were voted to the top of The Hype Machine's popular chart, and it received one million downloads. On April 6, 2010 he received a takedown request from Warner Music Group and was forced to remove official download links from his site.

== This is real life (mixtape) ==
Shortly after the takedown, he began work on material for a live set and a mixtape, eventually releasing this is real life on August 31, 2010. He asked fans to call and leave him voicemails at a Google Voice number (347-WTWHT-01) to be sampled on the record, and in two weeks received messages from dozens of countries that he cut up to create the intro and interludes on the mixtape. Additionally, he created the mixtape as a pay what you want project on Bandcamp, with all profits going to Dave Eggers' youth writing non-profit, 826 Valencia. As of September 2011, he had raised $8500 for the organization.

The mixtape paired a number of hip hop artists with indie rock tracks in an A vs. B style, and included vocals from 50 Cent, DMX, Eminem, Jagged Edge, Jay-Z, Kanye West, Lil Wayne, Lord Tariq and Peter Gunz, Lupe Fiasco, Mase, Nas, Nelly, Obie Trice, P Diddy, Rihanna, Snoop Dogg, and The-Dream paired with instrumentals from Crystal Castles, DFA, Justice, LCD Soundsystem, Madonna, MGMT, MIA, Miike Snow, OneRepublic, Phoenix, Placebo, Red Hot Chili Peppers, Say Hi, Sleigh Bells, Something Corporate, The Big Pink, The Notwist, and The Swell Season.

To accompany the mixtape's release, he headlined a sold-out show with fellow Google employee Hoodie Allen at Kimo's in San Francisco, marking the first time he incorporated drummer Will Paulus into the live show.

== 2010-11 touring ==
In the week following the release of this is real life, Kubal left Google to attend graduate school at the Stanford Graduate School of Business. He finished the year by performing in Toronto for Fashion Week and at a club in Kigali, Rwanda, and sold out another San Francisco warehouse show. In 2011 he played in Portland at Lewis & Clark College's Sunburn Music Festival with Astronautalis and Andrew Jackson Jihad, headlined Public Assembly in Brooklyn and bed supperclub in Bangkok, Thailand, and played all three days of The Bamboozle festival at Giants Stadium with Lil Wayne, Wiz Khalifa, Mötley Crüe, and Taking Back Sunday.

== Nasd out and wait what wednesdays ==
In September 2011, he lived in Rio de Janeiro, Brazil for a month before resuming second-year classes at Stanford, working with technology angel investors there. During this time, he completed work on his third album, nasd out, featuring Nas's vocals with Washed Out's debut full-length, Within & Without. The album received positive critical praise, with blogs calling it "another masterpiece" and "equally great [as the notorious xx]." To celebrate the album's release he headlined a sold-out album release show at Public Works in San Francisco with Capital Cities.

On November 7, 2011, Kubal announced he would be releasing a new track each Wednesday until the end of the year, dubbing the series wait what wednesdays.

== Discography ==
=== Albums ===
- the notorious xx (2010)
- nasd out (Nas vs. Washed Out) (2011)
- lorde yeezus (Kanye West vs. Lorde) (2015)
- folklore circles (Mac Miller vs. Taylor Swift) (2021)

=== Mixtapes ===
- this is real life (2010)
- tingo (2012)

=== Extended plays ===
- we're all busy but good (vol1:fall) (2014)
- i mean i guess (vol2:winter) (2015)
- cashmere ye (Kanye West vs. Cashmere Cat) (2016)
- do it again (Jay-Z vs. Robyn & Röyksopp) (2016)
- sorry for the delayed reply (vol3:spring) (2017)
- asking for a friend (vol4:summer) (2017)
