= Charles Armstrong School =

Independent school in Belmont, California, US

Coordinates: 37°30′39″N 122°17′01″W

Charles Armstrong School, located in Belmont, California, is an independent, non-profit, co-educational lower and middle day school specializing in teaching students with language-based learning differences, such as dyslexia. Armstrong helps its students re-enter traditional public and private schools with the learning tools necessary to be language proficient. Tuition, grants and donations support Charles Armstrong School, which is the only school of its kind in the San Francisco Bay Area.

The school provides a full academic program, along with elective classes for middle school students, and extracurricular sports and drama activities.

Charles Armstrong School is certified by the California State Board of Education and has received the highest rating from the Western Association of Schools and Colleges.

== History ==
Charles Armstrong School first opened its doors in 1968 to eighteen dyslexic children in the second, third and fourth grades. The school was housed in a renovated single dwelling home on University Drive in the downtown area of Menlo Park, and consisted of three classrooms and a business office.

The school moved several times before purchasing the former McDougal Elementary School in Belmont, California, moving there in 1984. At one time Charles Armstrong School included a high school, but later returned to offering only the elementary and middle school. Charles Armstrong School has schooled over 3,000 students during its history.
