= Davey Glen Park =

Coordinates: 37°31′30″N 122°17′10″W

Davey Glen Park is a 1-acre (4,000 m^{2}) piece of parkland set aside by the city of Belmont, California, in 2000 as part of an upscale housing development nearby. Donation of land for parks or in-lieu fees are required by the city for such development. In this case, The developer donated land valued at approximately $450,000 to the City of Belmont Parks Department in 2000 for use as a park. The site is zoned for planned development, but the title is held by the city.

The layout of Davey Glen Park is similar to that of Twin Pines park and other parks in Belmont. There is a flat area with a slope and a stream below it. The bay and Mount Diablo are partially visible through the eucalyptus trees. It is close to a neighborhood shopping area. The park is located near the top of a steep grade, and there is a privately owned concrete walking path trail that provides access to the residents on North Road. This walking path was donated by the two adjacent homeowners (one of whom was a former mayor of Belmont).
