= Belmont, California =

City in California, United States

- City
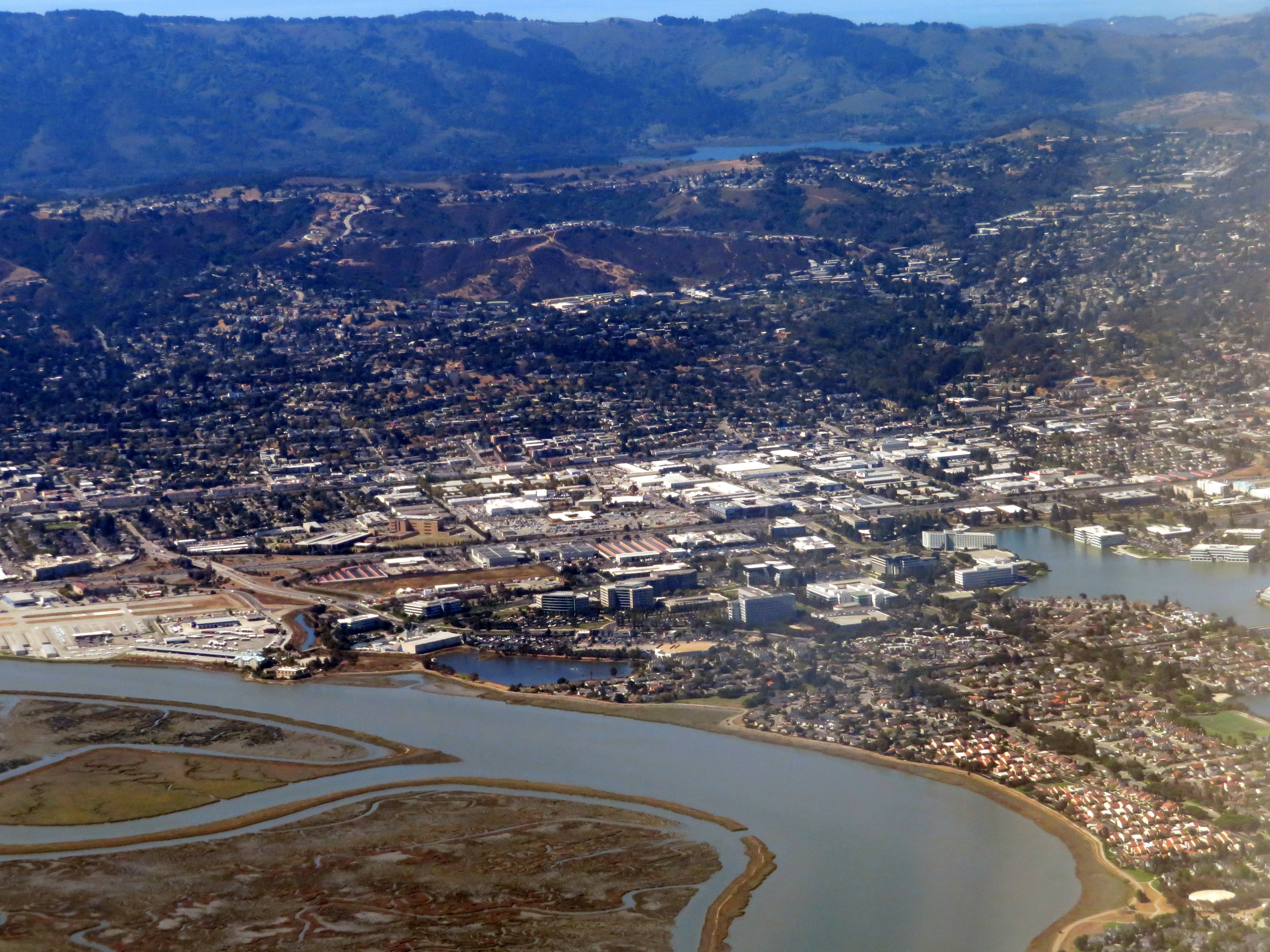

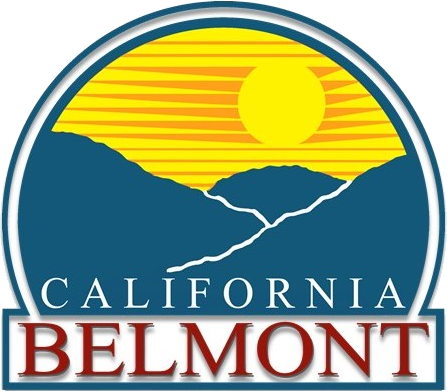
- Seal
- Interactive map of Belmont, California
- Location in the United States
- Coordinates: 37°31′5″N 122°17′30″W
- Country: United States
- State: California
- County: San Mateo
- Incorporated: October 29, 1926

Government
  - Mayor: Julia Mates
  - City council: Robin Pang-Maganaris, Vice Mayor; Tom McCune; Gina Latimerlo; Cathy Jordan
  - US Representative: Kevin Mullin (D)
  - State Senator: Josh Becker (D)
  - Assemblymember: Diane Papan (D)

Area
  - Total: 4.64 sq mi (12.01 km^{2})
  - Land: 4.63 sq mi (11.99 km^{2})
  - Water: 0.0077 sq mi (0.02 km^{2}) 0.19%
- Elevation: 43 ft (13 m)

Population (2020)
  - Total: 28,335
  - Density: 6,120.4/sq mi (2,363.11/km^{2})
- Time zone: UTC-8 (Pacific)
  - Summer (DST): UTC-7 (PDT)
- ZIP code: 94002
- Area code: 650
- FIPS code: 06-05108
- GNIS feature IDs: 1658029, 2409826
- Website: www.belmont.gov

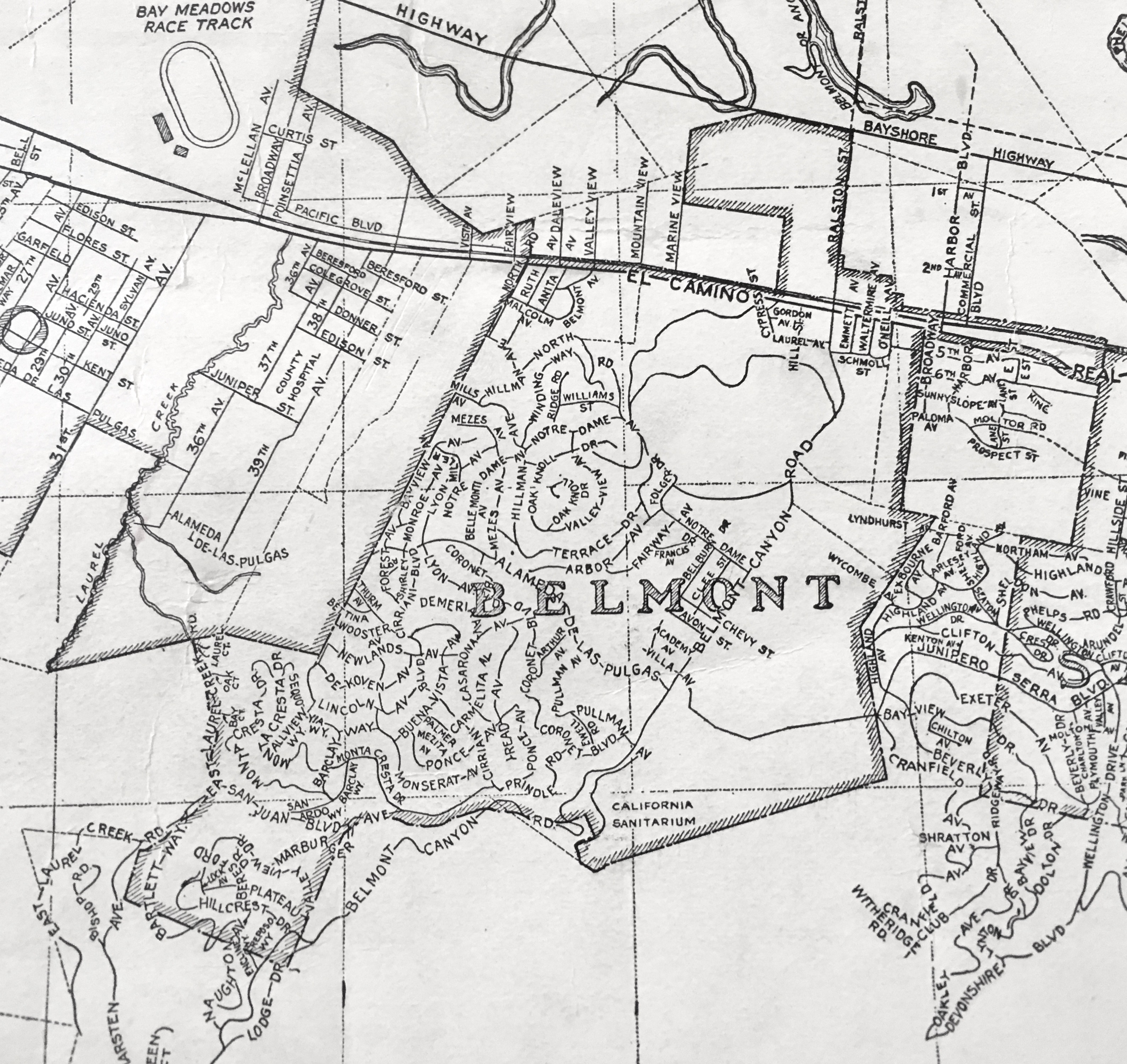
City limits and streets in 1937

Belmont is a city in San Mateo County, California, United States. It is in the San Francisco Bay Area, on the San Francisco Peninsula about halfway between San Francisco and San Jose, on the northern edge of California’s Silicon Valley. It was originally part of Rancho de las Pulgas, for which one of its main roads, the Alameda de las Pulgas, is named. The city was incorporated in 1926. Its population was 28,335 at the 2020 census.

Ralston Hall is a historic landmark built by Bank of California founder William Chapman Ralston on the campus of Notre Dame de Namur University, and is also home to Notre Dame High School. It was built around a villa formerly owned by Count Leonetto Cipriani, an Italian aristocrat. The locally famous "Waterdog Lake" is also located in the foothills and highlands of Belmont. A surviving structure from the Panama–Pacific International Exposition is on Belmont Avenue (another is the Palace of Fine Arts in San Francisco). The building was brought to Belmont by E.D. Swift shortly after the exposition closed in 1915.

The city is bordered by San Mateo to the north, the San Francisco Public Utilities Commission's Peninsula Watershed of the to the west, Redwood Shores to the east, and San Carlos to the south.

Belmont has a smoking ordinance, passed in January 2009, which bans smoking in all businesses and multi-story apartments and condominiums; the ordinance has been described as one of the strictest in the nation.

== Etymology ==
The name is believed to derive from the Italian bel monte, meaning "beautiful mountain." The town was named for the "symmetrically rounded eminence" nearby.

== Geography ==
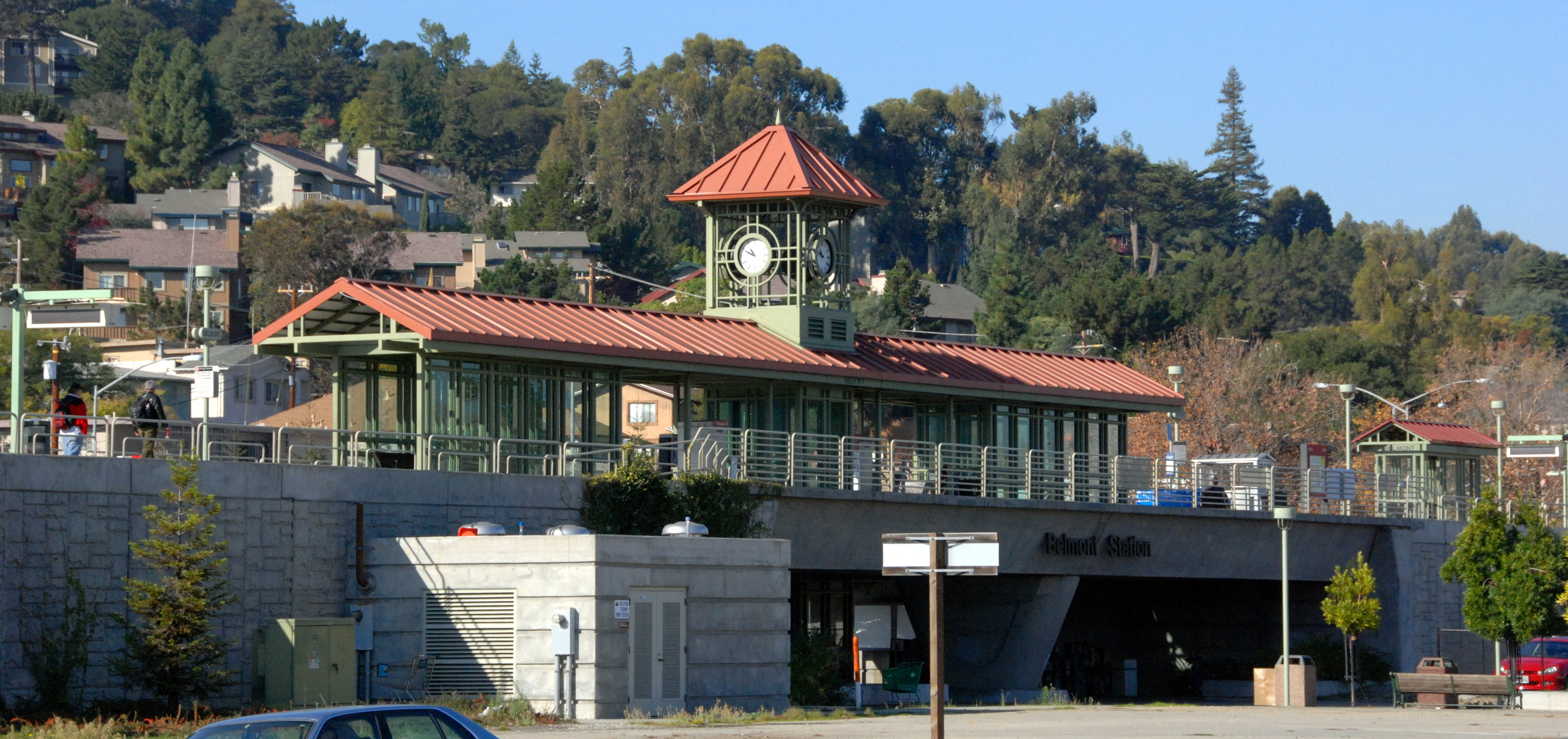
Train station in Belmont

Belmont is located at 37°31′5″N 122°17′30″W (37.518087, -122.291673).

According to the United States Census Bureau, the city has a land area of 4.63 square miles (12.0 km^{2}) and 0.009 square miles (0.023 km^{2}) of water.

== Demographics ==
Historical population
Census	Pop.	Note	%±
1880	202		—
1930	984		—
1940	1,229		24.9%
1950	5,567		353.0%
1960	15,996		187.3%
1970	23,538		47.1%
1980	24,505		4.1%
1990	24,127		−1.5%
2000	25,123		4.1%
2010	25,835		2.8%
2020	28,335		9.7%
U.S. Decennial Census; 1860–1870 1880-1890; 1900 1910 1920; 1930 1940 1950; 1960 1970 1980; 1990 2000 2010; 2020

=== Racial and ethnic composition ===
Belmont city, California – Racial and ethnic composition Note: the US Census treats Hispanic/Latino as an ethnic category. This table excludes Latinos from the racial categories and assigns them to a separate category. Hispanics/Latinos may be of any race.
Race / Ethnicity (NH = Non-Hispanic)	Pop 2000	Pop 2010	Pop 2020	% 2000	% 2010	% 2020
White alone (NH)	17,696	15,831	13,572	70.44%	61.28%	47.90%
Black or African American alone (NH)	389	402	348	1.55%	1.56%	1.23%
Native American or Alaska Native alone (NH)	57	44	22	0.23%	0.17%	0.08%
Asian alone (NH)	3,843	5,100	8,330	15.30%	19.74%	29.40%
Native Hawaiian or Pacific Islander alone (NH)	122	180	132	0.49%	0.70%	0.47%
Other race alone (NH)	95	97	300	0.38%	0.38%	1.06%
Mixed race or Multiracial (NH)	831	1,204	2,108	3.31%	4.66%	7.44%
Hispanic or Latino (any race)	2,090	2,977	3,523	8.32%	11.52%	12.43%
Total	25,123	25,835	28,335	100.00%	100.00%	100.00%

Belmont became a majority minority community in 2020.

=== 2020 census ===
As of the 2020 census, Belmont had a population of 28,335. The population density was 6,119.9 inhabitants per square mile (2,362.9/km^{2}).

The median age was 40.3 years. 21.7% of residents were under the age of 18 and 16.1% were 65 years of age or older. For every 100 females there were 96.4 males, and for every 100 females age 18 and over there were 95.3 males age 18 and over. 22,198 people (78.3%) were 18 years old or older, while 6,137 (21.7%) were younger than 18 years old.

All residents lived in urban areas, while none lived in rural areas.

There were 10,705 households in Belmont, of which 35.3% had children under the age of 18 living in them. Of all households, 57.7% were married-couple households, 15.3% were households with a male householder and no spouse or partner present, and 20.7% were households with a female householder and no spouse or partner present. About 22.4% of all households were made up of individuals and 9.3% had someone living alone who was 65 years of age or older.

There were 11,169 housing units; 10,705 were occupied and 464 were vacant (4.2% vacant). The homeowner vacancy rate was 1.0% and the rental vacancy rate was 5.2%.

722 people (2.5%) were living in group quarters, including 203 in nursing facilities, 339 in college/university student housing, and 180 in other facilities.

Racial composition as of the 2020 census
Race	Number	Percent
White	14,248	50.3%
Black or African American	370	1.3%
American Indian and Alaska Native	102	0.4%
Asian	8,398	29.6%
Native Hawaiian and Other Pacific Islander	148	0.5%
Some other race	1,527	5.4%

Hispanic or Latino residents numbered 3,523 (12.4%); among them, 676 identified their race as White, 22 Black or African American, 80 American Indian and Alaska Native, 68 Asian, 16 Native Hawaiian and Other Pacific Islander, 1,227 Some Other Race, and 1,434 two or more races. 1,021 identified their race as both White and Some Other Race.

Among the residents who were not Hispanic or Latino, 13,572 were White, 348 were Black or African American, 22 were American Indian and Alaska Native, 8,330 were Asian, 132 were Native Hawaiians or other Pacific Islanders, 300 were of other races, and 2,108 were of two or more races. 2020 was the first recent census in which non-Hispanic White residents were not the majority of the population (47.9%). The largest mixed-race groups were White and Some Other Race (1,345, 4.7%) and White and Asian (1,312, 4.6%).

=== 2010 census ===
At the 2010 census Belmont had a population of 25,835. The population density was 5,579.8 inhabitants per square mile (2,154.4/km^{2}). The racial makeup of Belmont was 17,455 (67.6%) White, 420 (1.6%) African American, 72 (0.3%) Native American, 5,151 (19.9%) Asian, 198 (0.8%) Pacific Islander, 964 (3.7%) from other races, and 1,572 (6.1%) from two or more races. Hispanic or Latino of any race were 2,977 persons (11.5%).

The census reported that 25,321 people (98.0% of the population) lived in households, 394 (1.5%) lived in non-institutionalized group quarters, and 120 (0.5%) were institutionalized.

There were 10,575 households, 3,251 (30.7%) had children under the age of 18 living in them, 5,630 (53.2%) were opposite-sex married couples living together, 830 (7.8%) had a female householder with no husband or wife present, 391 (3.7%) had a male householder with no wife or husband present. There were 510 (4.8%) unmarried opposite-sex partnerships, and 96 (0.9%) same-sex married couples or partnerships. 2,904 households (27.5%) were one person and 997 (9.4%) had someone living alone who was 65 or older. The average household size was 2.39. There were 6,851 families (64.8% of households); the average family size was 2.95.

The age distribution was 5,395 people (20.9%) under the age of 18, 1,668 people (6.5%) aged 18 to 24, 7,645 people (29.6%) aged 25 to 44, 7,284 people (28.2%) aged 45 to 64, and 3,843 people (14.9%) who were 65 or older. The median age was 40.9 years. For every 100 females, there were 95.4 males. For every 100 females age 18 and over, there were 92.5 males.

There were 11,028 housing units at an average density of 2,381.8 per square mile, of the occupied units 6,280 (59.4%) were owner-occupied and 4,295 (42.0%) were rented. The homeowner vacancy rate was 0.7%; the rental vacancy rate was 5.2%. 16,473 people (63.8% of the population) lived in owner-occupied housing units and 8,848 people (34.2%) lived in rental housing units.

=== Income ===
In 2023, the US Census Bureau estimated that the median household income was $207,609, and the per capita income was $98,669. About 4.4% of families and 6.5% of the population were below the poverty line.

=== Recognition ===
In May 2009, Belmont was ranked 11th on Forbes list of "America's Top 25 Towns to Live Well."

== Government ==
=== Federal and state representation ===
In the California State Legislature, Belmont is in the 13th senatorial district, represented by Democrat Josh Becker, and in the 21st Assembly district, represented by Democrat Diane Papan.

Federally, Belmont is in California's 15th congressional district, represented by Democrat Kevin Mullin.

According to the California Secretary of State, as of February 10, 2019, Belmont has 15,827 registered voters. Of those, 7,678 (48.5%) are registered Democrats, 2,540 (16%) are registered Republicans, and 4,994 (31.6%) have declined to state a political party.

=== Facilities ===
The city is served by the Belmont Public Library of the San Mateo County Libraries, a member of the Peninsula Library System.

The city has a number of parks. This includes Twin Pines Park, Waterdog Lake Open Space, Semeria Park and Davey Glen Park.

Child education is provided by public and private facilities. Students in Belmont are eligible to receive public schooling through two school districts: Belmont-Redwood Shores School District (kindergarten through middle school) and Sequoia Union High School District (high school). There are also several private schools. The private Charles Armstrong School specializes in language-based learning differences, such as dyslexia.

The city's largest hotel is Hyatt House, which is an apartment hotel and caters mostly to a business clientele, due to its proximity to Oracle headquarters.

=== Smoking policy ===
In January 2009, Belmont adopted an ordinance that bans smoking in city parks, all businesses, and all multi-story apartments and condominiums. The policy, which has been described as perhaps the strictest anti-smoking law in the nation, was the result of a group of retirees lobbying the city to stop secondhand smoke from drifting into their apartments from neighboring places. Public health advocates consider the ordinance to be a new front in a national battle against tobacco; officials from the American Lung Association of California said "Belmont broke through this invisible barrier in the sense that it addressed drifting smoke in housing as a public health issue."

== Education ==
=== Public schools ===
The public schools in Belmont are highly rated. The public schools in Belmont are run by the Belmont – Redwood Shores School District (BRSSD). The public high school in Belmont, Carlmont High School, however, is in Sequoia Union High School District.

==== Elementary schools ====
- Central Elementary School
- Cipriani Elementary School
- Fox Elementary School
- Nesbit

==== Middle schools ====
- Ralston Middle School
- Nesbit (K-8)

==== High school ====
- Carlmont High School

=== Private schools ===
- Immaculate Heart of Mary School (preschool through 8th grade)
- Crystal Springs Uplands School Middle School Campus (6th through 12th grade)
- Merry Moppet Belmont Oaks Academy (preschool through 5th grade)
- Notre Dame High School
- Charles Armstrong School specializing in language-based learning differences, such as dyslexia

==== Colleges ====
- Notre Dame de Namur University

== Transportation ==
=== Public transportation ===
SamTrans provides local bus service within Belmont as well as the entire county of San Mateo. Caltrain provides commuter rail service on the San Francisco Peninsula between San Francisco and San Jose including Belmont station in the city, and Hillsdale station in southern San Mateo city, near the border. Caltrain also goes as far south as Gilroy.

== Economy ==
=== Top employers ===
According to the city's 2021 Comprehensive Annual Financial Report, the top employers in 2021 were:

#	Employer	# of Employees
1	RingCentral, Inc.	693
2	Autobahn Motors	129
3	Safeway Store #1138	112
4	Volkswagen Group of America	109
5	Nikon Precision, Inc.	95
6	Silverado Senior Living	95
7	Lunardi's Market	82
8	James Electronics Ltd.	62
9	Woodmont Real Estate Services	57
10	Merry Moppet Preschool, Inc.	55

== Sister city ==
- Namur, Belgium

== See also ==
- San Mateo County
- Economy of California
- San Francisco Bay Area
