= Violin Memory =

American computer storage company

Violin Systems
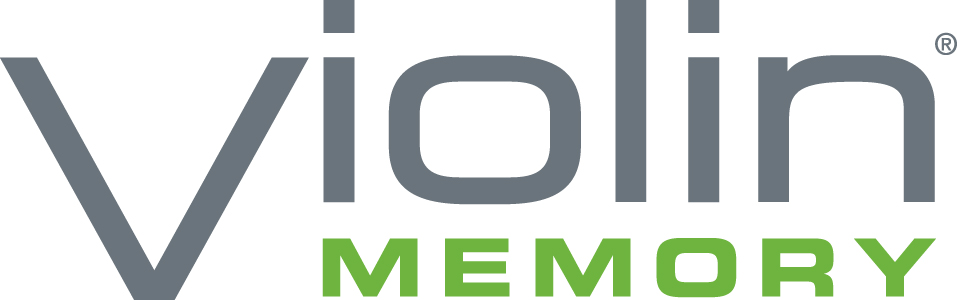
- Type: Private
- Founded: 2005; 21 years ago
- Headquarters: San Jose, California, U.S.
- Key people: CEO: Mark Lewis, COO: Todd Oseth, CMO: Gary Lyng, SVP Worldwide Field Operations
- Owner: Quantum Group of Funds
- Website: violinsystems.com

Violin Systems, formerly Violin Memory, was a private American company based in Silicon Valley, California, that designed and manufactured computer data storage products.

== Corporate history ==
The company was founded in 2005 as Violin Technologies by Donpaul Stephens and Jon Bennett in Iselin, New Jersey. Series A financing valued over $10 million was raised in 2010. Two more rounds of financing in 2011 raised an additional $75 million. Corporate investors included Juniper Networks and Toshiba America Electronic Components (TAEC). It was based in Mountain View, California around this time.

Series D financing of $80 million in March 2012 was led by SAP Ventures (arm of SAP AG), and included Highland Capital, GSV and others. The reported valuation was over $800 million.

Violin Memory's initial public offering in September 2013, raised $162 million at a price of $9 a share. Its stock price dropped to $2 a share after its largest partner, Hewlett Packard, became a competitor and due to concerns of how quickly it was spending money. The company experienced losses of $34 million the following year and the board called for the resignation of the CEO. Additionally, five shareholder lawsuits were filed against the company, alleging it did not disclose the financial impact expected from a federal shutdown. In December 2013, the company terminated CEO Basile, replacing him with Kevin DeNuccio in February 2014.

The New York Stock Exchange de-listed Violin Memory shares in October 2016 because its market capitalization had fallen below $15 million. A few days later, it changed to be traded on the OTC Markets Group exchange OTCQX, using the same VMEM symbol. In November 2016, it was valued at $3.7 million. On December 14, 2016, Violin Memory filed for Chapter 11 Federal Bankruptcy protection.

On April 24, 2017, Violin announced in a press release that they had emerged from bankruptcy, and had been purchased by Quantum Partners LP, a private investment fund managed by Soros Fund Management LLC.

On October 16, 2018, Violin Systems released the statement that it had agreed to acquire the storage business of X-IO Technologies and in conjunction with the transaction X-IO has renamed itself as Axellio as its new company name.

In 2020, Violin Systems was bought out by StorCentric, Inc.

== Technology ==
Violin did not use solid-state drives (SSD), but instead used a proprietary design referred to as flash fabric architecture (FFA). The FFA technology consisted of a mesh of NAND flash dies, modules that organized the mesh of flash dies, and a proprietary switched architecture for fault tolerance. In September 2011, Violin announced the 6000 series all-silicon shared flash memory storage arrays.

vMOS is Violin Memory's software layer that integrates with the FFA to provide data protection, management and connectivity to the host.

== Products ==
Violin extreme performance storage platform, XVS 8 released October 4, 2018.

The Violin 7000 series includes application aware snapshots, continuous data protection, synchronous replication, asynchronous replication and metro cluster functionality.

On December 1, 2015, the Violin Memory FSP 7250 and 7600 were announced. The Violin FSP 7250 was marketed as an entry level point product.

The 7700 series can scale up to ten 6000 or 7000 series arrays for up to 700TB of raw capacity or 3.5 PB with deduplication

The Violin 6000 series all flash arrays include the 6600, 6200 and 6100. The 6600 is based on SLC flash and offers 17.5TB of capacity. The 6200 offers flash performance at capacities from 17.5 to 70TB. The 6100 is a smaller array at lower price of entry with a pay as you grow option.

As of now, All the products of this company have been discontinued.
