= San Mateo County Libraries =

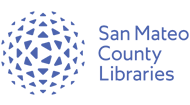
- 37°30′37″N 122°20′07″W
- Location: San Mateo County, United States
- Type: Public library
- Established: 1912; 114 years ago
- Branches: 13

Collection
- Size: 1 million

Access and use
- Access requirements: California residency to check out items.
- Circulation: 3,379,055 (2015)
- Population served: 2,281,657 (2015)
- Members: 258,170

Other information
- Budget: US$63,483,024 (2026)
- Director: Anne-Marie Despain
- Employees: 154 FTE
- Website: smcl.org

San Mateo County Libraries (SMCL) is a public library system serving eleven cities and the unincorporated areas of San Mateo County, California. It provides services through 13 community libraries, mobile services, and digital collections. Since 1999, it has operated under a joint powers authority comprising San Mateo County and its participating cities.

Established by the San Mateo County Board of Supervisors in 1912 as the San Mateo County Free Public Library, the system began operating in 1915. During the first half of the twentieth century, its network included branches and small library stations housed in schools, post offices, and local businesses. Bookmobile service began in 1953, extending access to communities without nearby library buildings. SMCL is a member of the Peninsula Library System, a regional consortium through which public and community college libraries cooperate in sharing collections and services.

== Locations ==
The following locations are a part of the system:

Branch	Street Address	City	ZIP	Image
Atherton	2 Dinkelspiel Station Lane	Atherton	94027	
Belmont	1110 Alameda de las Pulgas	Belmont	94002	Belmont Library
Bookmobile	Throughout the County			
Brisbane	163 Visitacion Avenue	Brisbane	94005	Brisbane Library
East Palo Alto	2415 University Avenue	East Palo Alto	94303	East Palo Alto Library
Foster City	1000 East Hillsdale Boulevard	Foster City	94404	Foster City Library
Half Moon Bay	620 Correas Street	Half Moon Bay	94019	Half Moon Bay Library
Millbrae	1 Library Avenue	Millbrae	94030	Millbrae Library
North Fair Oaks	2510 Middlefield Road	Redwood City	94030	North Fair Oaks Library
Pacifica Sanchez	1111 Terra Nova Boulevard	Pacifica	94044	Pacifica-Sanchez Library
Pacifica Sharp Park	104 Hilton Way	Pacifica	94044	Pacifica-Sharp Park Library
Portola Valley	765 Portola Road	Portola Valley	94028	Portola Valley
San Carlos	610 Elm Street	San Carlos	94070	San Carlos Library
Woodside	3140 Woodside Road	Woodside	94062	Woodside Library

The bookmobile service travels around the county to various locations like schools, post offices, and even the Hiller Aviation Museum.
