= The notorious xx =

the notorious xx

Remix album by wait what
- Released: March 25, 2010
- Label: Self-released
- Producer: Charlie Kubal

the notorious xx is a mashup project that pairs the music of Notorious B.I.G. with the debut album of The xx, xx. It was released on the web March 25, 2010 and at a San Francisco listening party. Since its release, the album received one million downloads, press from thousands of blogs and magazines, including New York Magazine and LA Weekly, and The Guardian called it "the best mashup album of 2010".

== Reception ==
Overall, the album was received very well. Fans voted several of the songs to the top of The Hype Machine's popular chart, New York Magazine called it "really great stuff," Sputnik labeled it "a combination that is sublime," and The Guardian noted that it "works amazingly well...impressive.". Members of The xx also mentioned enjoying the album in a number of interviews, and it received attention from NPR, music critic Sasha Frere-Jones of The New Yorker, and Marc Jacobs, among others.

Additionally, there is a video for "juicy-r" that pairs footage from the original videos for Juicy and VCR.

=== Controversy and takedown ===
On April 6, 2010, wait what received a takedown request from Warner Music Group. After receiving advice from Girl Talk, Elizabeth Stark, the EFF, and Lawrence Lessig, he complied and removed official download links from his site.

== Tracks ==
No.	Title	Music	Vocals	Length
1.	"dead wrong intro"	""Intro" (from xx, 2009)	"Dead Wrong" (from Born Again, 1999)	3:57
2.	"juicy-r"	"VCR" (from xx, 2009)	"Juicy" (from Ready to Die, 1994)	3:56
3.	"it's all about the crystalizabeths"	"Crystalised" (from xx, 2009)	"It's All About the Benjamins" (from No Way Out, 1997)	4:33
4.	"islands is the limit"	"Islands" (from xx, 2009)	"Sky's the Limit" (from Life After Death, 1997)	3:03
5.	"one more chance for a heart to skip a beat"	"Heart Skipped a Beat" (from xx, 2009)	"One More Chance" (from Ready to Die, 1994)	4:44
6.	"suicidal fantasy"	"Fantasy" (from xx, 2009)	"Suicidal Thoughts" (from Ready to Die, 1994)	2:50
7.	"everyday shelter"	"Shelter" (from xx, 2009)	"Everyday Struggle" (from Ready to Die, 1994)	3:32
8.	"basic hypnosis"	"Basic Space" (from xx, 2009)	"Hypnotize" (from Life After Death, 1997)	3:05
9.	"infinite victory"	"Infinity" (from xx, 2009)	"Victory'" (from No Way Out, 1997)	4:28
10.	"the curious incident of big poppa in the nighttime"	"Night Time" (from xx, 2009)	"Big Poppa" (from Ready to Die, 1994)	3:48
11.	"mo stars mo problems"	"Stars" (from xx, 2009)	"Mo Money Mo Problems" (from Life After Death, 1997)	4:17
