= Arlo Guthrie discography =

Discography of American folk musician Arlo Guthrie

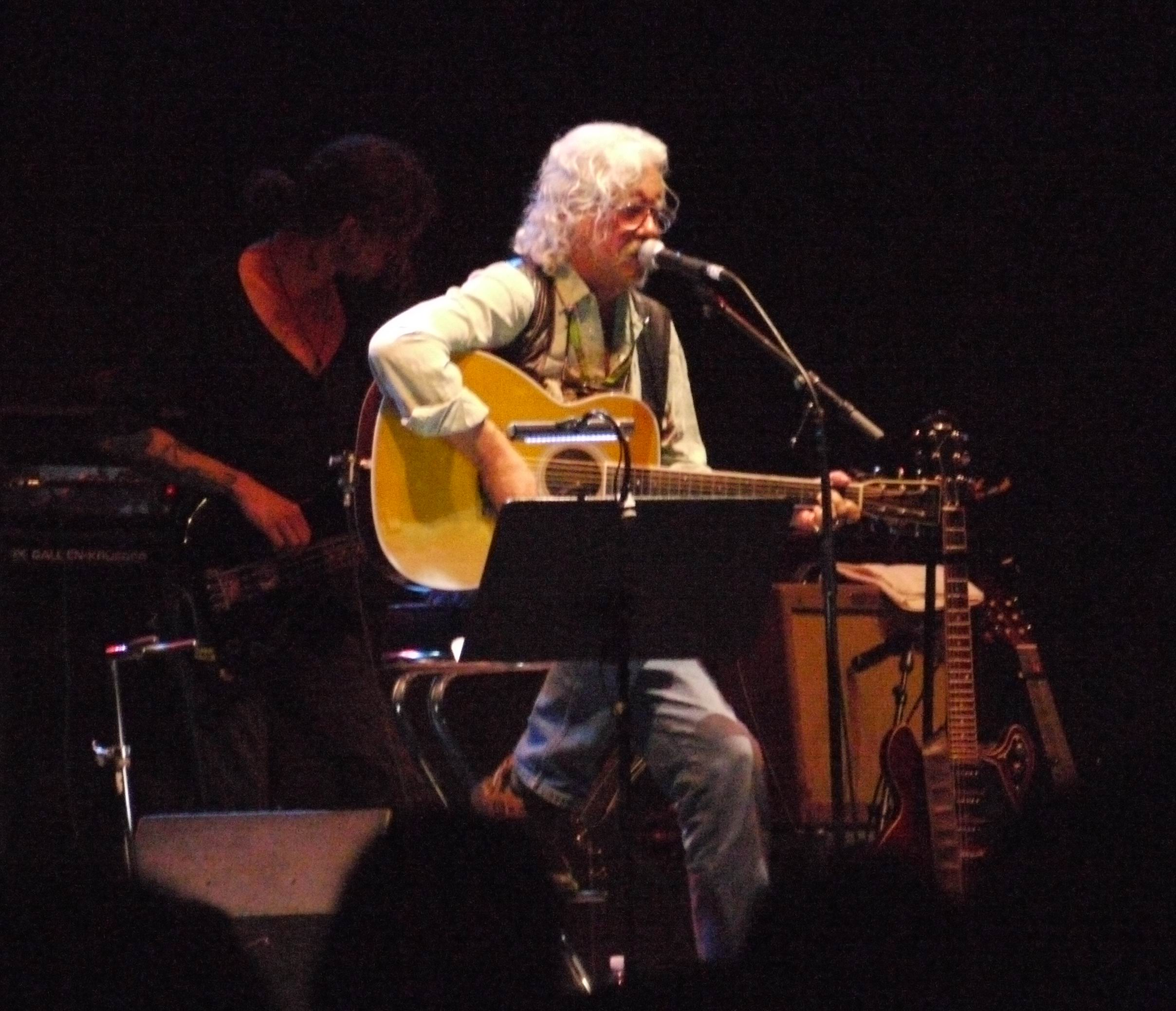
- Guthrie performing in 2010
- Studio albums: 19
- Live albums: 10
- Compilation albums: 2
- Singles: 17

This is the discography of Arlo Guthrie.

== Studio albums ==
Year	Title	Peak chart positions		Certification
Year	Title	US	AUS	Certification
1967	Alice's Restaurant: Released: October 1967; Label: Warner Bros./Reprise (R-6267); Format:	17	—	US: Platinum
1969	Running Down the Road: Released: Label: Reprise (RS-6346); Format:	54	—	
1969	Alice's Restaurant Soundtrack: Released: Label: United Artists; Format:	63	22	
1970	Washington County: Released: Label: Reprise RS-6411; Format:	33	28	
1972	Hobo's Lullaby: Released: Label: Reprise MS-2060; Format:	52	—	
1973	Last of the Brooklyn Cowboys: Released: Label: Reprise MS-2124; Format:	87	—	
1974	Arlo Guthrie: Released: Label: Reprise MS-2183; Format:	165	—	
1976	Amigo: Released: Label: Rising Son Records RSR-2239; Format:	133	—	
1978	One Night: Released: Label: Rising Son Records RSR-3232; Format:	—	—	
1979	Outlasting the Blues: Released: Label: Rising Son Records RSR-3336; Format:	—	—	
1981	Power of Love: Released: Label: Rising Son Records RSR-3558; Format:	184	—	
1986	Someday: Released: Label: Rising Son Records RSR-0001; Format:	—	—	
1992	Son of the Wind: Released: Label: Rising Son Records RSR-0003; Format:	—	—	
1992	2 Songs: Released: Label: Rising Son Records RSR-0006; Format:	—	—	
1996	Mystic Journey: Released: Label: Rising Son Records RSR-0009; Format:	—	—	
1997	This Land Is Your Land: An All American Children's Folk Classic: Released: Label: Format:	—	—	
2002	Banjoman: A Tribute to Derroll Adams (various artists): Released: Label: Format:	—	—	
2008	32¢ Postage Due (alternatively rendered as Thirty-Two Cents: Postage Due, all songs by Woody Guthrie, performed by Arlo Guthrie with the Dillards): Released: Label: Rising Son Records RSR-1127; Format:	—	—	
2009	Tales Of '69: Released: Label: Rising Son Records RSR-1128; Format:	—	—	
"—" denotes a recording that did not chart or was not released in that territory.

== Compilation albums ==
Year	Title	Peak chart positions		Certification
Year	Title	US	AUS	Certification
1977	The Best of Arlo Guthrie: Released: Label: Format: Warner Brothers BSK-3117	202	36	US: Gold
1991	All Over the World: Released: Label: Rising Son Records RSR-0002; Format:	—	—	
"—" denotes a recording that did not chart or was not released in that territory.

== Live albums ==
Year	Title	Chart US
1968	Arlo: Released: Label: Reprise RS-6299; Format:	100
1975	Together in Concert (with Pete Seeger, two-record set): Released: Label: Reprise 2R-2214; Format:	181
1982	Precious Friend (with Pete Seeger, two-record set): Released: Label: Rising Son Records RSR-3644; Format:	-
1994	More Together Again (with Pete Seeger, two-record set): Released: Label: Rising Son Records RSR-0007; Format:	-
1996	Alice's Restaurant (The Massacree Revisited): Released: Label: Rising Son Records RSR-0010; Format:	-
2000	Til We Outnumber 'Em (various artists, live program featuring and hosted by Guthrie): Released: May 23, 2000; Label: Righteous Babe Records 19; Format: CD	-
2005	Live in Sydney: Released: Label: Rising Son Records RSR-1124; Format:	-
2007	In Times Like These: Released: July 10, 2007; Label: Rising Son Records RSR-1126; Format:	-
2010	Every 100 Years – Live auf der Wartburg: Released: Label: Matrosenblau; Format:	-
2011	Live at 2011 New Orleans Jazz & Heritage Festival: Released: October 5, 2011; Label: MunckMix Inc; Format:	-

== Singles ==
Year	Title	Peak chart positions			Notes
Year	Title	US	AUS	CAN	Notes
1967	"The Motorcycle Song"		-	-	
1969	"Running Down the Road"		-	-	
1969	"Alice's Rock'n'Roll Restaurant"/	97	-	64	
1969	"Coming into Los Angeles"	125*	-	-	B-side
1970	"Valley to Pray"	102	33	75	
1971	"Ballad of Tricky Fred"	142*	-	-	
1972	"City of New Orleans"	18	58	11	Billboard Easy Listening - 4 // RPM A/C - 14
1972	"Ukulele Lady"		-	-	
1973	"Gypsy Davy"	105	-	43	Billboard Easy Listening - 23 // RPM A/C - 26
1973	"Lovesick Blues"		-	-	
1974	"Presidential Rag"	138*	-	-	
1976	"Massachusetts"		-	-	Official folk song of Massachusetts
1976	"Patriot's Dream"		-	-	
1976	"Guabi Guabi"		-	-	
1979	"Prologue"		-	-	With Shenandoah
1981	"If I Could Only Touch Your Life"		-	-	
1981	"Oklahoma Nights"		-	-	
U.S. charts are Billboard unless otherwise noted. * Record World Singles Chart.
