= The Best of Arlo Guthrie =

Greatest hits album by Arlo Guthrie
- Released: 1977
- Recorded: 1967–1976
- Genre: Folk rock
- Length: 51:38
- Label: Reprise (LP) Warner Bros (CD)

Professional ratings
Review scores
Source	Rating
AllMusic	4/5 stars
Christgau's Record Guide	B

The Best of Arlo Guthrie is a 1977 compilation album by Arlo Guthrie.

== Track listing ==
All tracks composed by Arlo Guthrie, except where indicated

1. "Alice's Restaurant Massacree" 18:33 – previously on Alice's Restaurant
2. "Gabriel's Mother's Hiway Ballad #16 Blues" 6:25 – previously on Washington County
3. "Cooper's Lament" 2:46 – previously on Last of the Brooklyn Cowboys
4. "Motorcycle (Significance of the Pickle) Song" 6:28 – previously on Alice's Restaurant and Arlo
5. "Coming into Los Angeles" 3:03 – previously on Running Down the Road
6. "Last Train" 3:03 – previously on Last of the Brooklyn Cowboys
7. "City of New Orleans" (written by Steve Goodman) 4:31 – previously on Hobo's Lullaby
8. "Darkest Hour" 4:04 – previously on Amigo
9. "Last to Leave" 2:35 – previously on Arlo Guthrie

Bonus Tracks on the CD Re-release:

1. "Presidential Rag" 4:27 – previously on Arlo Guthrie
2. "Deportees" (written by Woody Guthrie and Martin Hoffman) 3:49 – previously on Arlo Guthrie
3. "Children of Abraham" 2:23 – previously on Arlo Guthrie
