= Hobo's Lullaby =

Song by Goebel Reeves, performed by Woody Guthrie

"Hobo's Lullaby" is a folk song written by the American folk artist Goebel Reeves. The song describes a Great Depression scene of a singer calming a group of destitute men riding in a boxcar to find work. Woody Guthrie recorded a definitive cover version in 1944.

== Background ==
"Hobo's Lullaby" was written by Goebel Reeves.

== Reception and legacy ==
The song later came to be associated with folksinger Woody Guthrie, who is sometimes confused as its composer. It was one of his favorite songs. He recorded a cover of the song in 1944. In a songbook provided to listeners of his KFVD radio show Woody and Lefty Lou, he noted beneath the lyrics of the song, "Yes, pardnah, it is another world—another Life drawn apart from the one you know...A hobo's Life moves swiftly, broadly, talking and moving in terms of states, countries, seasons instead of the narrow, suffocating, Life of City Living so hemmed in on every side." Pete Seeger stated that the last time he visited Guthrie, he and Guthrie's son Arlo played the song for him, as, "It was the only song that we could have sung that could have made any sense. Shortly thereafter, Woody Guthrie, himself a weary hobo, left this hard world." During a 1970 tribute concert to Guthrie held at the Hollywood Bowl, the song was played by Joan Baez, the only song not authored by Guthrie on the setlist.

Arlo recorded a cover of the song in 1972 as the title track of his fourth studio album. The song was covered by folk singer Emmylou Harris on the 1987 album Folkways: A Vision Shared.

== Works cited ==
- Cohen, Ronald D. (2012). Woody Guthrie: Writing America's Songs. Routledge. ISBN 9780415895682.
- Hampton, Timothy (2019). Bob Dylan's Poetics: How the Songs Work. MIT Press. ISBN 9781942130246.
- Kaufman, Will (2017). Woody Guthrie's Modern World Blues. University of Oklahoma Press. ISBN 9780806159706.
