= Mystic Journey =

Mystic Journey may refer to:

- Mystic Journey (album), by Arlo Guthrie
- Mystic Journey (horse), a racehorse
- "Mystic Journey", a song by Jhené Aiko from her album Trip
