= Old-Time Religion =

"Old Time Religion"
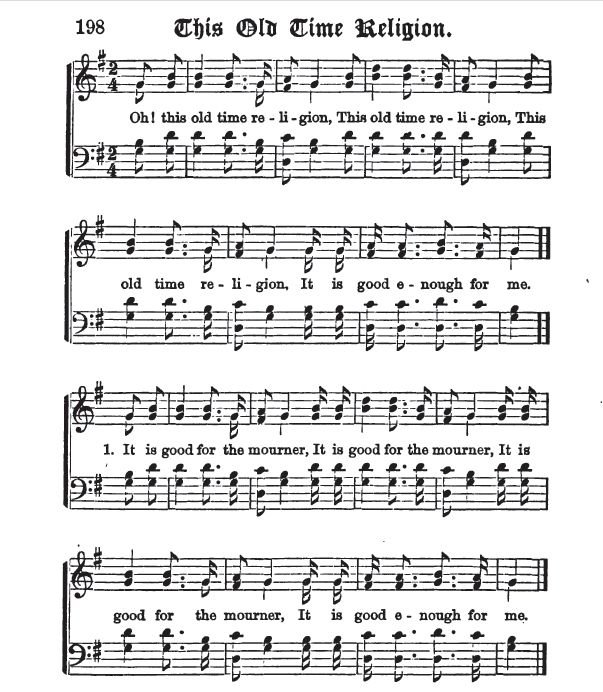
- Page from The Jubilee Singers, 1873

Song by Fisk Jubilee Singers (earliest attested)
- Genre: Negro spiritual

Audio sample
- Old-Time Religion, performed by Tuskegee Institute Singers (1915): file; help

("Give Me That") "Old-Time Religion" (and similar spellings) is a traditional Gospel song dating from 1873, when it was included in a list of Jubilee songs, or earlier. It has become a standard in many Protestant hymnals, though it says nothing about Jesus or the gospel, and has been covered by many artists. Some scholars, such as Forrest Mason McCann, have asserted the possibility of an earlier stage of evolution of the song, in that "the tune may go back to English folk origins" (later dying out in the white repertoire but staying alive in the work songs of African Americans). In any event, it was by way of Charles Davis Tillman that the song had incalculable influence on the confluence of black spiritual and white gospel song traditions in forming the genre now known as southern gospel. Tillman was largely responsible for publishing the song into the repertoire of white audiences. It was first heard sung by African-Americans and written down by Tillman when he attended a camp meeting in Lexington, South Carolina in 1889. Popular versions of the song were recorded in the 1950s by singers including Tennessee Ernie Ford and Jim Reeves.

== Lyrics ==
Most common lyrics performed are a repetition of the chorus:

Give me that old-time religion,
Give me that old-time religion
Give me that old-time religion
It's good enough for me

The lyrics, however, as sung by the Fisk Jubilee Singers are:

Oh! this old-time religion
This old-time religion
This old-time religion
It is good enough for me

Following Tillman's nuanced changes that accommodated the song more toward the tastes of white southern church congregations, Elmer Leon Jorgenson and other editors preferred the more-formalized first line "'Tis the old-time religion" (likewise the repeated first line of the refrain).

== In popular culture ==
- The SATB musical arrangement popularized in the hymnals published by Charles Davis Tillman is the background song in the 1941 film Sergeant York. It is featured prominently in the film Inherit the Wind. It also appears in Russ Meyer's penultimate movie Beneath the Valley of the Ultra-Vixens and in HBO's Carnivàle.
- British folk busking duo The Brotherhood (Don Partridge and Pat Keene) recorded a lively version of this song on their 1966 album "Singin' 'n' Sole-In"
- This song is referenced in Captain Beefheart's song "Moonlight on Vermont" on his 1969 album Trout Mask Replica.
- Numerous parodic folk verses for "Old-Time Religion" exist, made famous by Arlo Guthrie and Pete Seeger in live performances and on their live album Precious Friend. The parody verses make reference to a very wide range of "old-time religions" that most Christians would consider pagan.
- Played in the opening sequence of Bioshock Infinite, inside of the lighthouse. Cover is by Polk Miller & His Old South Quartette.
- Referenced by 2018 video game Dusk for the name of Episode 1, Level 3 "Old Time Religion" as centered around a rural church building.
- Referenced by artist Will Wood in the song "The Song with Five Names, a.k.a. Soapbox Tao, a.k.a. Checkmate Atheists! a.k.a. Neospace Government, a.k.a. You Can Never Know", repeating twice with the second time ending with "It’s good enough but not enough to be good enough for me".

== See also ==
- Charles Davis Tillman
- Old-time music
