= This Land Is Your Land (disambiguation) =

This Land Is Your Land is a folk song by Woody Guthrie.

It may also refer to:

- This Land Is Your Land, an album by Arlo Guthrie
- "This Land Is Your Land", a television series episode
