= Aliza Greenblatt =

Yiddish poet (1888–1975)

- Born: Aliza Waitzman; September 8, 1888; Azarenits, Podolia Governorate, Russian Empire (now Ukraine)
- Died: September 21, 1975 (aged 87); New York, United States
- Occupations: Writer, poet
- Spouse: Isadore Greenblatt
- Children: 5, including Marjorie Guthrie
- Relatives: Arlo Guthrie (grandson); Richard Greenblatt (grandson); Nora Guthrie (granddaughter)

Aliza Greenblatt (Yiddish: עליזה גרינבלאַט; née Waitzman; September 8, 1888 – September 21, 1975) was an American Yiddish poet. Many of her poems, which were widely published in the Yiddish press, were also set to music and recorded by composers including Abraham Ellstein, Solomon Golub, and Esther Zweig. They were also recorded by Theodore Bikel and Sidor Belarsky, among others. Greenblatt published five volumes of Yiddish poetry and an autobiography in Yiddish, Baym fentsṭer fun a lebn (A Window on a Life Yiddish: ביים פענצטער פון א לעבן) and her works include such well-known Yiddish songs as Fisherlid, Amar Abaye, and Du, Du.

== Early life ==
Aliza Greenblatt was born in Azarenits, Bessarabia in the Podolia Governorate of the Russian Empire (present-day Ukraine), to Brokhe Bas-Tsion Rozovsky (Yiddish: ברכה בת־ציון ראָזאָװסקי) and Abraham Aronson (Yiddish: אַבֿרהם אַהרונזאָן). After her father died unexpectedly in 1893, her mother remarried and the family moved to Soroca. Aliza, her step-father, and her three step-brothers came to Philadelphia in 1900. Her mother and her younger sister immigrated in 1904 while her older sister arrived with her own family in 1922.

== Personal life ==
She married Isadore Greenblatt, also from Bessarabia, in 1907.

The couple had five children, Herbert (b. 1908), David (b. 1914), Gertrude (b. 1915), Marjorie (b. 1917), and Bernard (b. 1921). In 1920 the couple made a failed attempt to move to Mandatory Palestine. Thirty years later they tried again, after the establishment of the Jewish state, but after a year of struggling with the difficult conditions, they moved back to the United States, to New York City.

Isador's birth name was Isadore Stukelman. He is a cousin of Shifra Stukelman, and through her, cousin twice removed to Canadian composer Jan Randall (her grandson). Isador died in 1960, an active promoter of investment in Israel.

Her daughter Marjorie was a dancer in the Martha Graham Dance Company, and was married to folk musician Woody Guthrie. Marjorie's children are folk musician Arlo Guthrie; Nora Guthrie, president emeritus of The Woody Guthrie Foundation; and Joady Guthrie. Her nephew, and Aliza's grandson, is computer programmer Richard Greenblatt.

In the late 1940s, when Greenblatt and her daughter Marjorie and her family were living across the street from each other in Coney Island, Brooklyn, Greenblatt and her son-in-law Woody Guthrie developed a collaborative relationship, discussing their respective artistic projects and critiquing each other's works.

Aliza Greenblatt also helped found the Atlantic City, NJ chapters of the Zionist Organization of America, Hadassah and the Yidish Natsionaler Arbeter Farband. She was the president of the Pioneer Women. She was also involved in the fundraising for the Jewish National Fund and Histadrut.

== Books by Aliza Greenblatt ==
- Lebn mayns (My Life). Farlag Kadime-Central Philadelphia, 1935.
- Tsen lider mit gezang (Ten Poems with Music). Alizah Greenblatt: Brooklyn, 1939.
- Ikh zing (I Sing). Farlag Aliza: New York, 1947.
- Ikh un du (Me and You). Farlag Aliza: New York, 1951.
- In si-geyt baym yam (In Sea Gate by the Ocean). Farlag Aliza: New York, 1957.
- Baym fenster fun a lebn (At the Window of a Life). Farlag Aliza: New York, 1966.
