= Alice's Restaurant: The Massacree Revisited =

Live album by Arlo Guthrie
- Released: 1996
- Recorded: 1996
- Genres: Folk, folk rock
- Length: 42:13
- Label: Rising Son
- Producers: Arlo Guthrie and Gabe Guthrie

Arlo Guthrie chronology
More Together Again (1994)	Alice's Restaurant: The Massacree Revisited (1996)	Mystic Journey (1996)

Professional ratings
Review scores
Source	Rating
AllMusic	3.5/5 stars

Alice's Restaurant: The Massacree Revisited is a 1996 album by American folk singer Arlo Guthrie. The album is a new recording of all material from the entire original Alice's Restaurant album, as performed live 29 years later at The Church in Housatonic, Massachusetts. The cover of this release also pays homage to its predecessor as it pictures Guthrie in the same pose as the original album: sitting shirtless at a dinner table with a napkin spread over his chest, holding his fork and knife and waiting for Thanksgiving dinner to begin. This time, however, he is without his black bowler hat (displaying a full head of gray hair, longer than in the original picture) and 29 years older.

Each song is essentially faithful to the original, with one notable exception. At the end of the re-recording of "Alice's Restaurant Massacree", Guthrie launches into a postscript story about attending Jimmy Carter's inauguration in 1977. He meets Carter's son Chip, who tells him of the discovery of an opened copy of Alice's Restaurant left behind by the Nixon family when they left the White House, leading to speculation around the fact that the title song and the gap in the Watergate tapes are both 18½ minutes in length. The Massacree Revisited continued a tradition of Guthrie's to perform "Alice's Restaurant Massacree" only once every 10 years, with this version coinciding with the 30th anniversary of the song.

== Track listing ==
All tracks composed by Arlo Guthrie.

1. "Alice's Restaurant Massacree (The Massacree Revisited)" – 22:26
2. "Chilling of the Evening" – 3:52
3. "Ring-Around-a-Rosy Rag" – 2:36
4. "Now and Then" – 2:22
5. "I'm Going Home" – 3:50
6. "The Motorcycle Song" – 2:53
7. "Highway in the Wind" – 4:14

== Personnel ==
- Arlo Guthrie – vocals, keyboards
- Terry A La Berry – drums
- David Grover – guitar
- Sean Hurley – bass guitar
- Steve Ide – guitar
