= Marjorie Guthrie =

American female dancer (1917–1983)

Marjorie Mazia
- Born: Marjorie Greenblatt (Yiddish: חנה גרינבלאַט); October 6, 1917; Atlantic City, New Jersey, U.S.
- Died: March 13, 1983 (aged 65); New York City, U.S.
- Occupations: Dancer, activist
- Spouses: Woody Guthrie (m. 1945; div. 1953) Martin B. Stein (m. 1975)
- Children: 4, including Arlo and Nora
- Mother: Aliza Waitzman
- Relatives: Richard Greenblatt (nephew)
- Dancing career
- Former groups: Martha Graham Company
- Website: https://marjorieguthrie.com/

Marjorie Guthrie (née Greenblatt; October 6, 1917 – March 13, 1983), who used Marjorie Mazia as her professional name, was a dancer, dance teacher, and health science activist. She was the daughter of American Yiddish poet Aliza Greenblatt (née Waitzman) and the second of three wives of folk musician Woody Guthrie, to whom she was married from 1945 to 1953. Her four children with Guthrie include folk musician Arlo Guthrie and Woody Guthrie Publications president Nora Guthrie.

She was a principal dancer with the Martha Graham Company. With Graham's permission, she started her own dance studio where she taught Graham methods and style.

Woody Guthrie began experiencing symptoms of Huntington's disease in the 1940s, although his condition remained undiagnosed until 1952. After he and his third wife divorced in 1956, Marjorie Guthrie cared for him for the remainder of his life. Following his death in 1967, she became an activist, founding a predecessor of the Huntington's Disease Society of America in that year. She headed a Federal Commission for control of the disease in 1976 and 1977 and convinced President Jimmy Carter to form a Presidential Commission to study neurological diseases, including Huntington's. Her advocacy work also included serving on the National Committee for Research in Neurological and Communicative Disorders, the New York State Commission on Health Education and Illness Prevention, and the advisory council of the National Institute of General Medical Science. She died in Manhattan in 1983, aged 65.

== Life and work ==
Marjorie Greenblatt (Yiddish: חנה גרינבלאַט) was born in Atlantic City, New Jersey, United States, on October 6, 1917, to Aliza Waitzman and Izadore Greenblatt. Her parents were Jewish immigrants from Ukraine. She had three brothers - David, Herbert and Bernard - and one sister, Gertrude.

In 1935, after graduation from the Overbrook High School in Philadelphia, Pennsylvania, Marjorie moved to New York City on scholarship and joined the Martha Graham Dance Company. As a core company member, Marjorie appeared in such iconic pieces as "Primitive Mysteries", "American Document", "Every Soul is a Circus", and "Appalachian Spring". She grew to become Graham's assistant for fifteen years and was the first company member invited to teach the Graham technique independently of Martha's own school. Two of Marjorie's early students were Erick Hawkins and Merce Cunningham.

=== Woody Guthrie ===
Mazia was introduced to Guthrie in 1942 through her activity as a Martha Graham dancer. According to the Marjorie Guthrie Project:

Marjorie Mazia met Woody Guthrie in 1942, when he was a member of the Almanac Singers, living at 430 6th Avenue, in Greenwich Village in a communal apartment playfully named Almanac House.

Marjorie was to appear in fellow Graham dancer Sophie Maslow’s New Dance Group performance of "Folksay". In an attempt to create something unique, Sophie choreographed a dance to rural roots music.

Woody had recently released his first record Dust Bowl Ballads on Victor Records, a 3-disc collection of 78's consisting of 11 songs in July, 1940. Sophie had selected songs from this recording to choreograph to and when she found out that Woody Guthrie was living in New York City, decided to invite him to play live on-stage for the performance.

Marjorie insisted on going with Sophie. Since hearing Dust Bowl Ballads she had dreamed Woody was a tall cowboy with a Stetson hat...when she knocked on the door, there appeared a 5'6" wiry guy. She turned to look at Sophie and said, "I’m going to marry him."

Mazia and Guthrie wed on November 13, 1945. Together they had four children; Cathy Guthrie (1943-1947), Arlo Guthrie (b. 1947), Joady Guthrie (b. 1948), and Nora Guthrie (b. 1950). Cathy died from severe burns caused by an apartment fire when she was four.

=== Majorie Mazia School of Dance ===
Mazia founded the Marjorie Mazia School of Dance, located at 1618 Sheepshead Bay Road, Brooklyn, New York. Thanks to her years with the Martha Graham Dance Company, she often had special guest dance teachers like Merce Cunningham. Marjorie's school trained young dancers in Modern Dance and Ballet in the 1950s, '60s and '70s. In 1950, Mazia recorded, Dance Along on Folkways Records, a dance album for children. She is extensively cited in the book, Outwitting History by National Yiddish Book Center founder/director Aaron Lansky.

=== Husband's illness ===
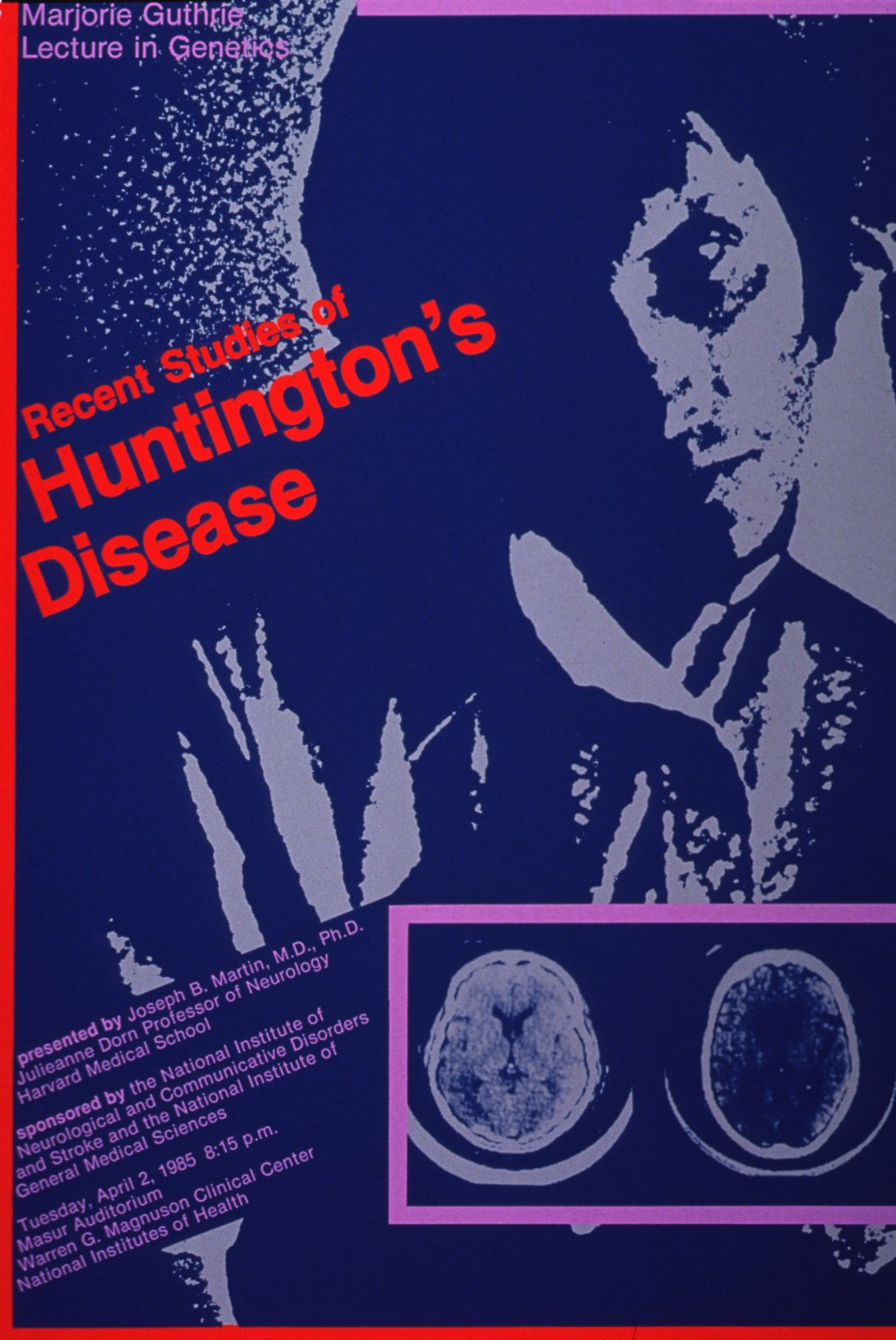
Poster for "Marjorie Guthrie Lecture in Genetics: Recent Studies of Huntington's Disease", presented by Dr. Joseph B. Martin.

By the late 1940s, Guthrie's health was declining. He received various misdiagnoses, but in 1952, it was finally determined that he was suffering from Huntington's disease. During the more than 15 years that the disease affected him, Marjorie stood by his side as she supervised Woody's hospital care. She even taught him to communicate by blinking his eyes after he had lost control of his other muscles. Though she was Guthrie's second wife (of three) they maintained a close relationship throughout his life and she provided constant care to Guthrie until his death. Following his death in 1967, she founded the Committee to Combat Huntington's Disease. This eventually became the Huntington's Disease Society of America.

When Woody became ill, I was told that the case was hopeless and helpless. Assuming that was so, I just said, well, I’ve got to live with hopeless and helpless. And if my children have the disease, I’m going to have to live with that too. But after a long period, in and out of that hospital, I said to myself, “Why is it hopeless and helpless?” And with my kids now being old enough to be able to take care of themselves, I went to Dr. Whittier, who was in charge of Creedmore Institute, where Woody was at that time, and said, “I want to help". And he introduced me to some other scientists and they said, “You might be able to help if you could just find families. We believe that this disorder is all over the world, it is hidden, families don’t even know they have it, and those that do are so ashamed they won’t tell anybody because there’s a stigma attached.” With that kind of help, I began to look for families with this disease and then founded the Committee to Combat Huntington's Disease. We found the disorder was much more prevalent than anybody believed possible.

— Marjorie Guthrie

Marjorie headed a Federal commission for control of the disease in 1976 and 1977 and convinced President Jimmy Carter to form a Presidential Commission to study neurological diseases, including Huntington's. She also headed the public and governmental information committee of the National Committee for Research in Neurological and Communicative Disorders, was a member of the New York State Commission on Health Education and Illness Prevention and of the state's Genetic Advisory Committee, and was a lay member of the advisory council of the National Institute of General Medical Science.

Joe Klein's 1980 biography, Woody Guthrie: A Life is based extensively on Marjorie Guthrie's recollections and collected papers, and contains substantial details of her life up through Woody Guthrie's death in 1967.

In 1975, she married Martin B. Stein, who was vice president of the Committee to Combat Huntington's Disease. She died of cancer on March 13, 1983, in Manhattan, where she lived, aged 65.
