= Ozaryntsi =

Ozaryntsi Озаринці
- Village
- Location of Ozaryntsi Ozaryntsi (Ukraine)
- Coordinates: 48°32′26″N 27°48′25″E
- Country: Ukraine
- Oblast: Vinnytsia Oblast
- Raion: Mohyliv-Podilskyi Raion
- Hromada: Mohyliv-Podilskyi urban hromada
- Founded: 1431

Area
  - Total: 5.03 km^{2} (1.94 sq mi)

Population 2001 census
  - Total: 1,987
  - Density: 395.03/km^{2} (1,023.1/sq mi)
- Postal code: 24041
- Area code: +380 4337

Ozaryntsi (Ukrainian: Озаринці; Russian: Озаринцы, translit. Ozarintsy; Romanian: Ozarinet; Yiddish: אַזאַרעניץ, translit. Azarenits) is a village in the Mohyliv-Podilskyi Raion of the Vinnytsia Oblast, Ukraine.

== Famous people from Ozaryntsi ==
- Aliza Greenblatt (1888–1975) – Yiddish poet.
