= Goebel Reeves =

American folk singer (1899–1959)

- Born: Goebel Leon Reeves; October 9 1899; Sherman, Texas, United States
- Died: January 26 1959 (aged 59)
- Occupation: Singer

Goebel Leon Reeves (October 9, 1899 – January 26, 1959) was an American folk singer, born in Sherman, Texas, and raised in Austin.

Reeves' most famous song is "Hobo's Lullaby", covered by various singers, as in Woody at 100: The Woody Guthrie Centennial Collection. Woody Guthrie's son Arlo also sang it, on Hobo's Lullaby. Others include Emmylou Harris, David Carradine, Pete Seeger and Billy Bragg. A 2016 article in the Los Angeles Times called it "one of the most disarmingly endearing train songs ever written" and "inextricably linked with American folk music icon Woody Guthrie".

Reeves appeared in the 1937 Western film The Silver Trail, playing a singer named Hank in an uncredited role. He died of a heart attack on January 26, 1959, in the VA Long Beach Healthcare System of Long Beach, California.
