= Charles Davis Tillman =

American singer-songwriter (1861–1943)

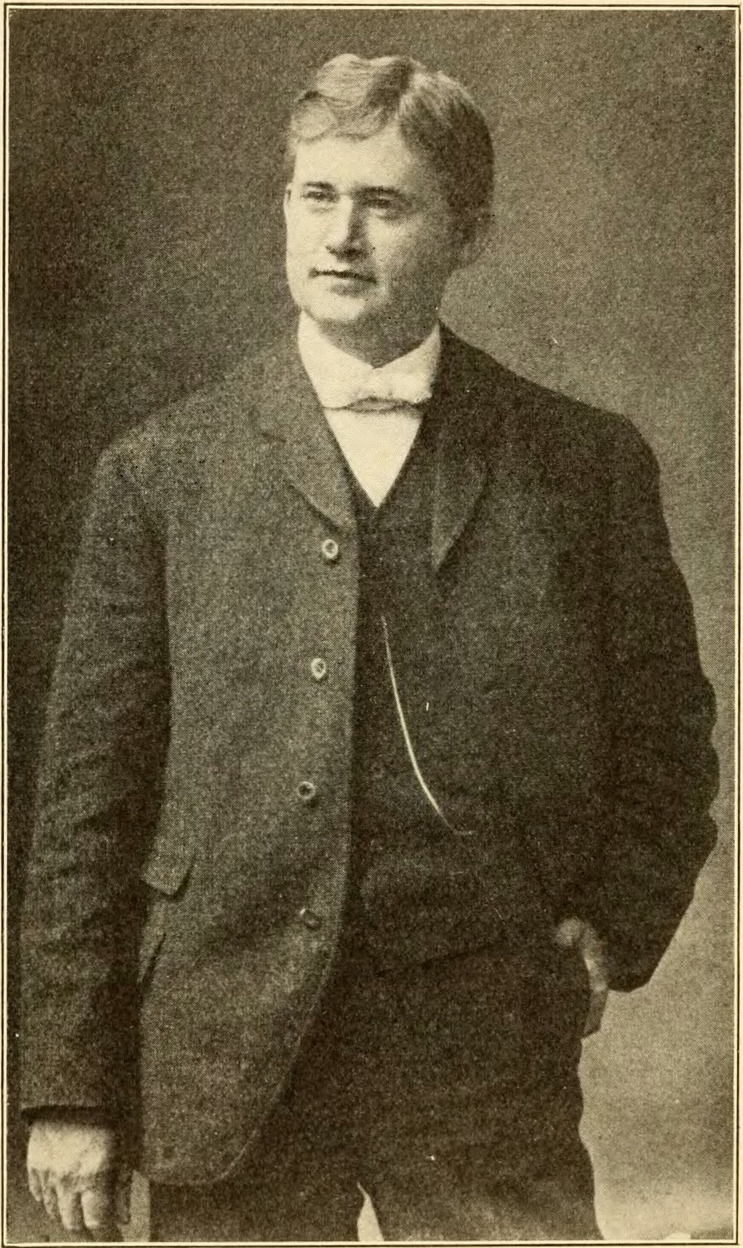
- Born: March 20, 1861
- Died: 1943

Charles Davis Tillman (March 20, 1861, Tallassee, Alabama – September 2, 1943, Atlanta, Georgia) —also known as Charlie D. Tillman, Charles Tillman, Charlie Tillman, and C. D. Tillman—was a popularizer of the gospel song. He had a knack for adopting material from eclectic sources and flowing it into the mix now known as southern gospel, becoming one of the formative influences on that genre.

The youngest son of Baptist preacher James Lafayette Tillman and Mary (Davis) Tillman, for 14 years prior to 1887 he painted houses, sold sheet music for a company in Raleigh, North Carolina, and peddled Wizard Oil. In 1887 he focused his career more on his church and musical talents, singing first tenor in a church male quartet and establishing his own church-related music publishing company in Atlanta.

== "Old-Time Religion" ==
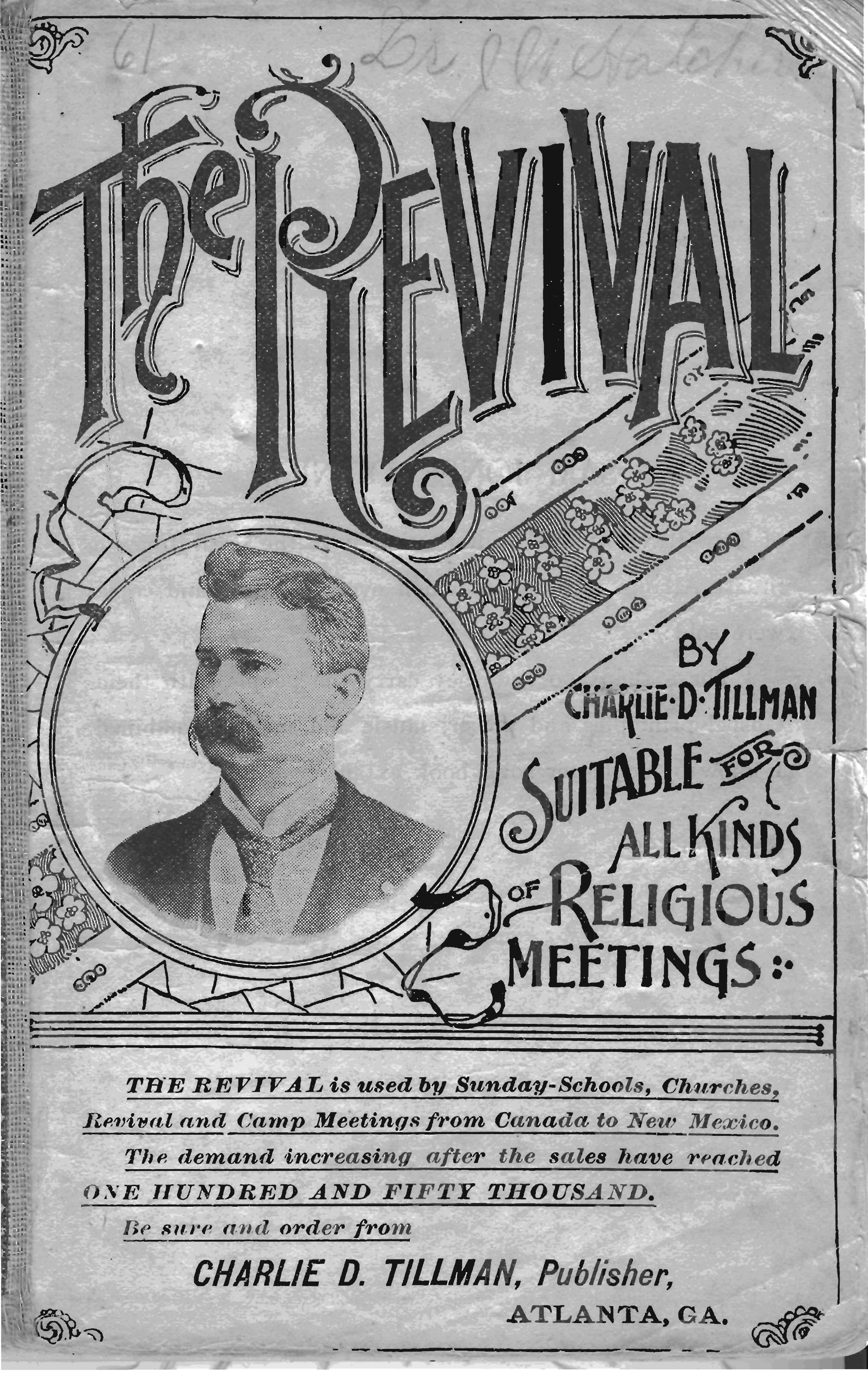
Print of Tillman's photograph on the title page of Revival No. 2, published in 1896

In 1889 Tillman was assisting his father with a tent meeting in Lexington, South Carolina. The elder Tillman lent the tent to an African American group for a singing meeting on a Sunday afternoon. It was then that young Tillman first heard the spiritual "The Old Time Religion" and then quickly scrawled the words and the rudiments of the tune on a scrap of paper. Tillman published the work to his largely white church market in 1891. Tillman was not first in publishing the song, an honor which goes to G. D. Pike in his 1873 Jubilee Singers and Their Campaign for Twenty Thousand Dollars. Rather, Tillman's contribution was that he culturally appropriated the song into the repertoire of white southerners, whose music was derived from gospel, a style that was a distinct influence on Buddy Holly and Elvis Presley. As published by Tillman, the song contains verses not found in Pike's 1873 version. These possibly had accumulated in oral tradition or/and were augmented by lyrics crafted by Tillman. More critically, perhaps, Tillman's published version of the tune has a more-mnemonic cadence which may have helped it gain wider currency. Tillman's emendations have characterized the song ever since, in the culture of all southerners irrespective of race. The SATB arrangement in Tillman's songbooks became known to Alvin York and is thus the background song for the 1941 Academy Award film Sergeant York, which spread "The Old-Time Religion" to audiences far beyond the South. Following Tillman's nuanced example, editors with a largely white target market such as Elmer Leon Jorgenson formalized the first line as "'Tis the old-time religion" (likewise the repeated first line of the refrain) to accommodate the song more to the tastes of white southern church congregations and their singing culture.

== "Life’s Railway to Heaven" ==
In 1890, Tillman set to music a hymn by Baptist preacher M.E. Abbey, "Life's Railway to Heaven." (Abbey had drawn from an earlier poem, "The Faithful Engineer," by William Shakespeare Hays.)

Also known by its first line "Life is like a mountain railroad", the song has been recorded by Boxcar Willie, Carter Family, Bill Monroe, Chuck Wagon Gang, The Oak Ridge Boys, Tennessee Ernie Ford, Merle Haggard, Johnny Cash, Brad Paisley, Russ Taff, Amazing Rhythm Aces, and many others. Tillman's tune is in 3/4 time, but a 4/4 version became also widespread after Patsy Cline recorded it that way in 1959 as a solo; Willie Nelson later dubbed his voice into that version to form a duet. On January 14, 2012, Brad Paisley performed a 4/4 rendition as guest on Garrison Keillor's Prairie Home Companion.

Members of the Western Writers of America chose the song as one of the Top 100 Western songs of all time.

The song features prominently in the 1979 TV movie Mr. Horn, sung first by David Carradine, and by Richard Widmark and Karen Black towards its ending.

The melody and some elements of the lyrics were adapted for the union song, "Miner's Lifeguard," with a refrain about mine operators who cheated workers out of honest weight, "Union miners, work together; Heed no operator's tale; Keep your hand upon the dollar, and your eye upon the scale."

== Other songs ==
Besides "The Old Time Religion" and "Life’s Railway to Heaven" the Cyber Hymnal lists other Tillman works, including "My Mother's Bible" as well as "Ready" and "When I Get to the End of the Way" ("The sands have been washed").

The Cyberhymnal lists also the following:

"Old Time Power" (first line "They Were in an Upper Chamber")
"Save One Soul for Jesus"
"The Spirit Is Calling"
"Unanswered Yet"

=== "My Mother's Bible" ===
"My Mother's Bible" is among the 'Mother Songs' of the tear-jerker variety as selected by Mudcat Cafe. Notwithstanding the sentimentality, "My Mother's Bible" emerged in a number of generally stately hymnals, including the Broadman Hymnal edited by Baylus Benjamin McKinney and Christian Hymns. The lyrics were written by a man by the name of Milan Williams, who was an evangelist in the late 1800s. He collaborated with Tillman and reflected his desire to write a song with these lyrics, and apparently the song was completed within a half hour.

=== "Ready" ===
"Ready to suffer grief or pain" had a British author in the tradition of the Keswick Hymn-Book, but Tillman wrote the tune which is invariably and exclusively used in the United States. Tillman first published the British lyrics with his tune in Tillman's Revival No. 4 in Atlanta in 1903. The British lyrics are in five quatrains. Tillman moved the original first quatrain into the refrain of his version and altered the words to wed better to the repeated nature of a refrain. He printed the song with a reference to 2 Samuel 15:15 ("Behold, thy servants are ready to do whatsoever my lord the king shall appoint"). In conveying this background, William Jensen Reynolds observes that the Southern Baptist Hymnal Committee decided to name the tune TILLMAN. Reynolds disputed the author's identity as A. C. Palmer, but other researchers have accepted the author's identity as Asa C. Palmer (1845–1882).

=== "When I Get to the End of the Way" ===
Forrest Mason McCann describes "When I Get to the End of the Way" as "A popular song with older folk" (like some hymnals which carry it, McCann indicates the song by its first line, "The sands have been washed"). The ability of Tillman's work to appeal outside the time and context of southern gospel is evident in the inclusion of "The Sands Have Been Washed" in the British Favourite Hymns of the Church where the tune name is indicated as THE END OF THE WAY; in the "Preface" (pp. iii-viii) editors Albert E. Winstanley & Graham A. Fisher emphasize that requests from churches which had previously used Elmer Leon Jorgenson's Great Songs of the Church (where the song appears) were a major consideration in which works to include. Jorgenson's hymnal, which offered traditional hymns and gospel songs, had spread "The Sands Have Been Washed" internationally throughout the Restoration Movement with which Jorgenson's hymnal was associated. "When I Get to the End of the Way" ("The sands have been washed") has also been popularized internationally by George Beverly Shea, Bill Gaither, and Lynda Randle.

=== "I Am a Poor Wayfaring Stranger" ===
Additionally, Tillman was responsible for publicizing the lyrics of "I Am a Poor Wayfaring Stranger" from Bever's Christian Songster (1858) together with two additional stanzas from Taylor's Revival Hymns & Plantation Melodies (1882) and popularizing the combination with the minor key tune of various African American and Appalachian nuance. It has been frequently analyzed, arranged, and recorded, its artists including Burl Ives, Joan Baez, Tennessee Ernie Ford, Johnny Cash, Dusty Springfield, Emmylou Harris, Bill Monroe, Jack White, Annah Graefe, Selah, and Peter, Paul and Mary, and the Mormon Tabernacle Choir.

== Recognized significance ==
Tillman was so recognized in his own time that, at the 1893 World Convention of Christian Workers in Boston, he served as songleader in place of Dwight L. Moody's associate Ira D. Sankey. Tillman's Assembly Book (1927) was selected by both Georgia and South Carolina for the musical scores used in public school programs. Tillman broke into radio early and performed regularly on Atlanta's radio station WSB 750 AM. Once in 1930 the NBC radio network put him on the air for an hour featuring his singing while his daughter accompanied on the piano. He also recorded on Columbia Records.

Tillman, who spent most of his life in Georgia and Texas, published 22 songbooks. He is memorialized in the Southern Gospel Museum and Hall of Fame and was among the first individuals to be inducted into the Gospel Music Hall of Fame.

Charlie D. Tillman is buried in Atlanta's Westview Cemetery. The monument at his grave bears selected "Life's Railway to Heaven" lyrics.
