= Ukulele Lady =

1925 American song

- Sheet music cover

Song
- Published: 1925
- Genre: Pop
- Composer: Richard A. Whiting
- Lyricist: Gus Kahn

"Ukulele Lady" is a popular standard by Gus Kahn and Richard A. Whiting. Published in 1925, the song was first made famous by Vaughn De Leath.

It has been recorded by the Paul Whiteman Orchestra with vocals by the Southern Fall Colored Quartet on June 3, 1925 (catalog No. 19690B); Frank Crumit recorded June 10, 1925 for Victor Records (catalog No. 19701); Lee Morse in 1925; Peter Sellers with the Temperance Seven, produced by George Martin, in 1960 (for the album Peter and Sophia); Jim Kweskin and the Jug Band in 1965; Arlo Guthrie on his 1972 album Hobo's Lullaby.

Bing Crosby recorded the song for his radio show in 1960 and it was subsequently released on the CD Return to Paradise Islands (2010).

Bette Midler first performed the song live in the 1997 TV special Diva Las Vegas as a tribute to her native Hawaii. Midler later recorded the song for her album Bathhouse Betty.
