= Nora Guthrie =

American record producer (born 1950)

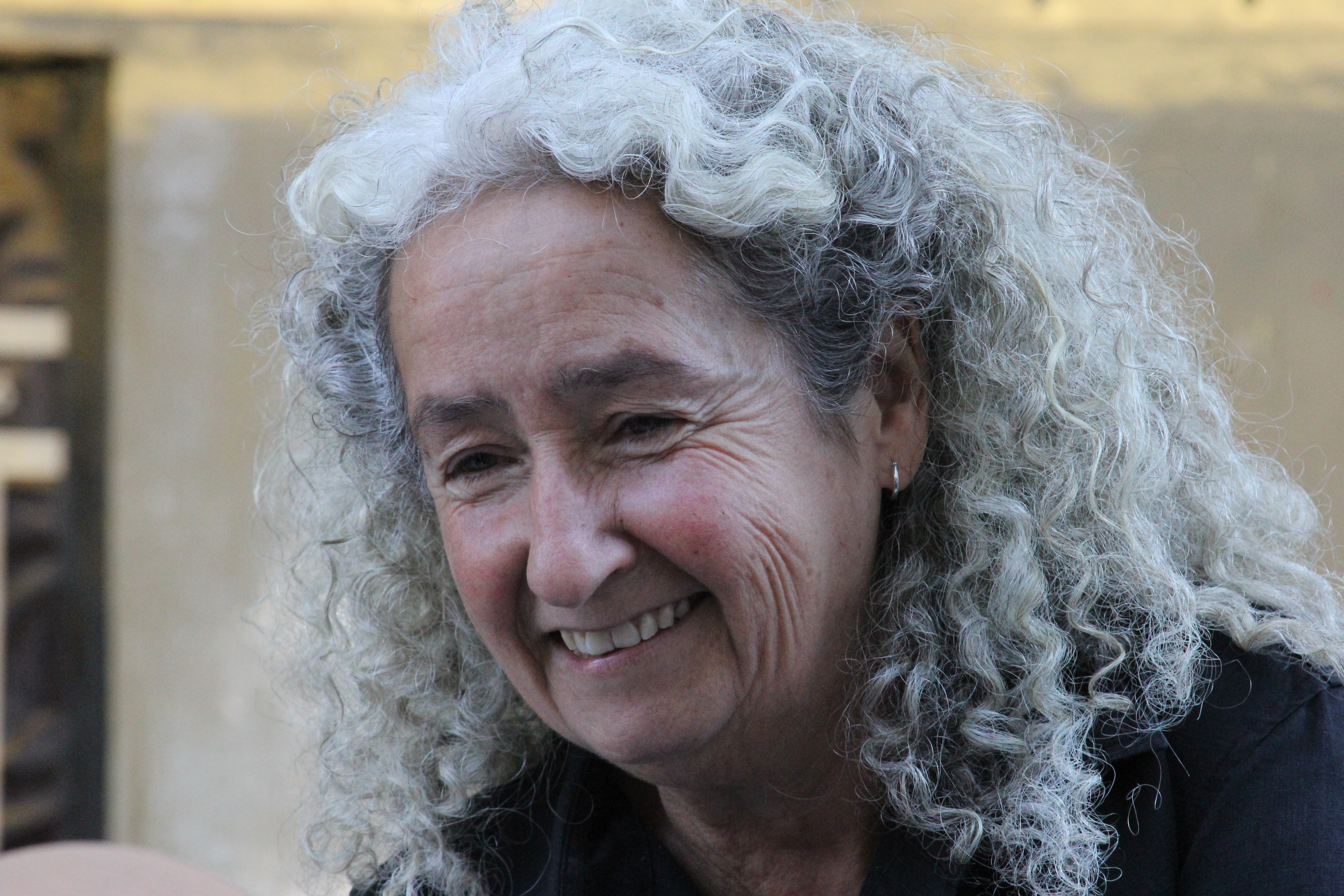
- Guthrie at the 2012 Brooklyn Book Festival
- Born: January 2, 1950 (age 76)
- Citizenship: United States
- Education: NYU Tisch School of the Arts
- Spouse: Michael Kleff
- Children: 2
- Parents: Woody Guthrie (father); Marjorie Mazia (mother)
- Relatives: Arlo Guthrie (brother); Aliza Greenblatt (maternal grandmother); Richard Greenblatt (cousin)

Nora Lee Guthrie (born January 2, 1950) is the daughter of American folk musician and singer-songwriter Woody Guthrie and his second wife Marjorie Mazia Guthrie, sister of singer-songwriter Arlo Guthrie, and granddaughter of renowned Yiddish poet Aliza Greenblatt. Nora Guthrie is president of The Woody Guthrie Foundation, president of Woody Guthrie Publications and founder of the Woody Guthrie Archive, and lives in Mt. Kisco, New York.

Nora was married to Ted Rotante from 1976 to 1996, and was remarried to Michael Kleff on May 6, 1999.

== Career ==
Nora Guthrie graduated from NYU Tisch School of the Arts in 1971. Following a career in modern dance Nora began working with her father's materials in 1992.

=== Dance career ===
Guthrie followed in her mother's footsteps, studying modern dance with the Martha Graham Dance Company and at New York University. She started a dance company with another NYU dancer, Ted Rotante, to whom she was married. (At the time of her mother's death, Nora went by the name Nora Rotante.)

=== Woody Guthrie legacy work ===
==== Early work ====
Guthrie's first project, in 1992, was the publication of a lost songbook of Woody's original lyrics and illustrations, Woody's 20 Grow Big Songs, published by HarperCollins. The following year, she co-produced the accompanying album with her brother Arlo; it received a Grammy nomination in the Best Children's Album category.

In 1994, Nora co-founded the Woody Guthrie Archives with Harold Leventhal and archivist Jorge Arevalo. In addition to managing the Archives and preserving her father's personal materials and original creative works, Nora develops and produces new projects which continue to expand Woody Guthrie's cultural legacy. In 1996, the Woody Guthrie Archives was open for free research to scholars and students, making Woody Guthrie's personal & professional collection available to the public for the first time.

==== Projects ====
In 1996, Guthrie co-produced the first Rock and Roll Hall of Fame Museum Tribute series honoring Woody Guthrie, featuring Bruce Springsteen, Billy Bragg, Arlo Guthrie, Indigo Girls and more .

In 1998, Guthrie was executive producer of the Billy Bragg/Wilco collaboration Mermaid Avenue and Mermaid Avenue 2. These albums created new music to previously unknown Woody Guthrie lyrics and received critical acclaim and Grammy nominations in 1999 and 2001 respectively. The first Mermaid Avenue album included the song "Hesitating Beauty" which is a love song about a woman named "Nora Lee." Wilco's Jeff Tweedy sang the lead and composed the music, and the band has performed the song live over 300 times. According to Bragg and Tweedy, Guthrie's father wrote the lyrics in 1949, before she was born.

In 1998, Nora worked with folk artist Kathy Jakobsen to create the children's book This Land is Your Land, published by Little Brown, and Co., which illustrates and highlights Guthrie's classic lyric. It has won numerous awards and literary praise. The same year, Guthrie curated her first major exhibit "This Land Is Your Land: The Life and Legacy of Woody Guthrie" in collaboration with the Smithsonian Institution Traveling Exhibition Service (SITES). The exhibit opened in May 2000, at the Gene Autry Museum of Western Heritage in Los Angeles and toured for three years at major museums throughout the country, including the National Museum, Washington, DC and the Museum of the City of New York.

Marking Woody Guthrie's 90th anniversary year, in 2003, Nora co-produced a month-long celebration of Woody's life and legacy in Nashville, TN. Programs included public school events, lectures, gallery exhibits, film screenings, concerts, and an exhibit at Nashville's Songwriters Hall of Fame. The month-long tribute culminated with "Nashville Sings Woody!", a concert at the Ryman Auditorium featuring local and international musicians.

In 2003, Nora collaborated with Berlin composer and performer Hans-Eckardt Wenzel on the innovative Ticky Tock, released on Contraer Musik Records. The same year, Nora invited working-man's punk rockers, Dropkick Murphys to the Woody Guthrie Archives, to work with Woody Guthrie's previously unpublished lyrics. The lyric selected was "Gonna Be A Blackout Tonight" and was the title track on their album Blackout, on Hellcat Records.

Guthrie worked with the klezmer band The Klezmatics, exploring Woody Guthrie's Jewish-themed lyrics. Members of the Klezmatics composed music for Woody's Hanuka lyrics for Happy Joyous Hanukkah, their 2004 holiday CD release. Wonder Wheel, their 2006 release focused on Woody's lyrics dealing with Jewish history, culture and spirituality, won the 2007 Grammy Award for Best World Music Album.

In 2001 the Woody Guthrie Archive received a donation of a wire recording dating back to the 1940s. Nora Guthrie and Woody Guthrie Archive curator, Jorge Arevalo Mateus spent years investigating audio restoration, in the hopes of finding something special on this artifact. As it turned out, the wire recordings contained a never before heard, complete live performance given by Woody Guthrie in December 1949. Woody's wife, Marjorie Mazia, acted as moderator for the program. The evening was a cultural event meant to introduce Woody Guthrie's songs to a small group of adults and children at the YMHA in Newark, NJ. The Live Wire: Woody Guthrie in Performance 1949, was self-released on Woody Guthrie Legacy Records, won the 2007 Grammy Award for Best Historic Album.

Woody Guthrie ArtWorks with Steven Brower, published by Rizzoli Press, is the first publication to highlight Woody as a visual artist.

In 2008, Nora released another new album of unpublished lyrics with folk rock singer-songwriter, Jonatha Brooke, The Works.

The premier release in the almost two-year celebration of Woody's centennial year was Note of Hope, a CD almost a decade in the making. This project was spearheaded by Nora and renowned bassist, Rob Wasserman, and explored Woody Guthrie's poetry and prose.

Following Note of Hope, another original collaborative project was released. New Multitudes features Jay Farrar (Son Volt), Jim James (My Morning Jacket), Will Johnson (Centro-matic), and Anders Parker. Nora first invited Jay Farrar to peruse the Archive, who invited the other musicians to collaborate on the project. Most of the lyrics on this two-CD release, derive from Woody's early years in Los Angeles, the 1930s. Woody's days spent down on LA's skid row, and later, his return to LA in the early 50s, are two distinctly emotional periods in his life.

==== 2012 : Woody Guthrie Centenary ====
The year-long celebrations, co-produced by Guthrie and Robert Santelli (executive director of the GRAMMY Museum Foundation) included educational conferences, exhibits, adult and elementary school outreach programs and presentations, and concerts that followed Woody's road from Oklahoma through California and on to New York City.

==== Later projects ====
In 2013, Guthrie collaborated with Douglas Brinkley and Johnny Depp to release House of Earth, a previously unpublished manuscript Woody Guthrie wrote in 1947. It tells the story of an expectant couple surviving the Dust Bowl and the depression in the Texas Panhandle and dreaming of a better future where they will own their own home. The same year, the Woody Guthrie Center opened in Tulsa, Oklahoma. Guthrie, along with Robert Santelli and the George Kaiser Family Foundation created the permanent home for the Woody Guthrie Archive. Also in 2013, she self-published Woody Guthrie's Wardy Forty: Greystone Park State Hospital Revisited.

In 2014 Guthrie released My Name Is New York: Ramblin’ Around Woody Guthrie’s Town, a walking tour guidebook to 19 significant locations in NYC where Woody Guthrie lived and composed.

In 2005, Guthrie commissioned contemporary classical composer David Amram to create a symphonic interpretation of "This Land Is Your Land", asking Amram to use the text and melody as the inspiration. To mark the 75th Anniversary of Woody's "This Land" – penned in 1940 in NYC – Newport Records released This Land; Symphonic Variations on a Song by Woody Guthrie, conducted by David Amram and performed by the Colorado Symphony Orchestra, on February 23, 2015.

She collaborated with Del McCoury on an album focused on Woody's hillbilly and bluegrass styled lyrics. The premiere took place on June 29, 2013, at Caramoor Center for Music and the Arts in Katonah, NY.
