= Esther Zweig =

American composer (1906–1981)

Esther Sommerstein Zweig (July 29, 1906 – August 3, 1981) was an American composer, writer, translator, and teacher. She was born in New York and studied at Hunter College, New York University, the University of Vienna, and the Jewish Theological Seminary. Her instructors included composers Walter Damrosch and Kurt Weill. She taught choral music in the Hebrew schools of New York from 1927 to 1937. Zweig set poems by Yiddish poet Aliza Greenblatt to music and translated works by other authors into English, Hebrew, and Yiddish. She married Jacob Zweig on June 29, 1930. From 1949 to 1950 she directed the Esther Zweig Ensemble in New York. Zweig received an award from the Jewish Theological Seminary in 1927 and a merit certificate from the University of Vienna. Today, the Jewish Theological Seminary awards the Esther Sommerstein Zweig Education Award annually to a student who has demonstrated unusual intellectual ability and potential for growth.

Zweig's published works include:

- Conquerors of Canaan (cantata)
- Ersht Nechtn - translated by Elsie Mintz, music by Esther Zweig
- Hersh and Miriam and Other Stories - by Wolf Karmiol, translated by Esther Zweig
- "I Close My Eyes and Dream" (song)
- "I Sing to You, America" (song)
- "Salute to Haganah" - music by Moshe Nathanson, English words by Esther Zweig
- "When the Angels Have Their Feasting" - words by Esther Zweig, music by Zavel Zilberts
- "You Well of Joy" opus 8 no 2 - words and music by Samuel Imber, translated by Esther Zweig
