= Precious Friend =

Live album by Arlo Guthrie and Pete Seeger
- Released: 1981
- Genre: Folk
- Label: Warner Bros.
- Producer: John Pilla

Professional ratings
Review scores
| Source | Rating |
|---|---|
| Allmusic | link |

Precious Friend is a double album by Arlo Guthrie and Pete Seeger with Shenandoah. The album, Guthrie's final record on Warner Bros., is a compilation of songs from when Guthrie and Seeger toured together. John Pilla produced the recording.

== Background ==
Precious Friend is a compilation of songs from when Guthrie and Seeger toured together. was recorded in 1981 at the Poplar Creek Music Theater, Pine Knob Music Theatre (DTE Energy Music Theatre), Greek Theatre and Concord Pavilion.

The songs on the album include "Kisses Sweeter than Wine", made famous by The Weavers, "If I Had a Hammer", and a multi-religious "Old Time Religion". The duo also perform three of Woody Guthrie's songs. Some tracks, rather than songs, are Guthrie or Pete telling stories or thinking out loud. The track Sailin' Up, Sailin' Down is based on Seeger's Hudson River Sloop Clearwater to clean up the Hudson River in the 1960s and beyond.

== Track listing ==
Side One

1. "Wabash Cannonball" (public domain)
2. "All My Life's a Circle" (Harry Chapin)
3. "Hills of Glenshee" (public domain)
4. "Ocean Crossing" (Guthrie)
5. "Celery-Time" (Guthrie)
6. "Run, Come See Jeruselum" (Blind Blake)
7. "Sailin' Up Sailin' Down" (Jimmy Reed, Lorre Wyatt)

Side Two

1. "How Can I Keep from Singing" (Doris Plenn)
2. "Old Time Religion" (public domain)
3. "Pretty Boy Floyd" (Woody Guthrie)
4. "Ladies Auxiliary" (Woody Guthrie)
5. "Please Don't Talk About Me When I'm Gone" (Sam H. Stept, Sidney Clare)
6. "Precious Friend, You Will Be There" (Pete Seeger)

Side Three

1. "Do Re Mi" (Woody Guthrie)
2. "Tarentella" (public domain)
3. "The Neutron Bomb Story" (Guthrie)
4. "I'm Changing My Name to Chrysler" (Tom Paxton)
5. "St Louis Tickle" (Guthrie)
6. "Wimoweh (Mbube)" (Solomon Linda, Paul Campbell)
7. "Will the Circle Be Unbroken" (Traditional)

Side Four

1. "Garden Song" (David Mallett)
2. "Kisses Sweeter than Wine" (Joel Newman, Paul Campbell)
3. "Raggedy Raggedy" (Lee Hays)
4. "In Dead Earnest" (Lee Hays)
5. "If I Had a Hammer" (Pete Seeger, Lee Hays)
6. "Amazing Grace" (John Newton)

== Critical reception ==
The album was praised upon its release by Rolling Stone (which did not review Guthrie's last album, Power of Love) as "more than a collection of old folk memories ... memory made alive." Stereo Review also ran a positive review, writing that it worked better than most other live albums because of Guthrie's and Seeger's "nice, decent, eternally optimistic" personalities. A later All Music Guide' review was more mixed, claiming some of the tracks "lost much of their initial charm" over time.
