= Son of the Wind =

Studio album by Arlo Guthrie
- Released: 1992
- Recorded: 1991
- Genre: Folk, cowboy music
- Length: 48:09
- Label: Rising Son
- Producer: David Grover, Arlo Guthrie

Arlo Guthrie chronology
2 Songs (1992)	Son of the Wind (1992)	All Over the World (1991)

Son of the Wind is an album by the American folk singer Arlo Guthrie, released in 1992. It is an album of cowboy songs recorded with Guthrie's band, Shenandoah. Guthrie had wanted to make such an album since he was a child.

== Critical reception ==
Professional ratings
Review scores
Source	Rating
AllMusic	4/5 stars

The Seattle Times called the album "a refreshing, spunky set, occasionally marred by Guthrie's casual vocal stylings but more often rescued by a terrific little band."

== Track listing ==
1. "Buffalo Gals" (Traditional) 2:40
2. "Dead or Alive" (Woody Guthrie) 3:03
3. "Streets of Laredo" (Traditional) 3:48
4. "Ridin' Down the Canyon" (Gene Autry, Smiley Burnette) 4:24
5. "South Coast" (Sam Eskin, Lillian Bos Ross, Richard Dehr, Frank Miller) 4:17
6. "Shenandoah" (Traditional) 5:10
7. "Gal I Left Behind" 1:57
8. "When the Cactus Is in Bloom" (Jimmie Rodgers) 3:08
9. "Woody's Rag/Hard Work" (Woody Guthrie) 3:52
10. "I Ride an Old Paint" 3:47
11. "Utah Carroll" 7:02
12. "Red River Valley" 5:01

== Personnel ==
- Arlo Guthrie – guitar, vocals
- Edward Gerhard – guitar
- John Culpo – accordion
- Dan Velika – bass
- Terry "A la Berry" Hall – drums
- Rick Tivens – fiddle, mandolin
- Tim Gray – hammer dulcimer
- Paul Kleinwald – banjo
- Zip Zantay – clarinet
- Bob Bowes, Dick Delmolino, Mike Joyce, Jim Labbee – background vocals
- Greg Steele – recording engineer and producer at Derek Studios
