= Solomon Golub =

Solomon Golub (27 February 1887 in Latvia – 18 June 1952 in Bronx, New York) was a Russian Empire-born, naturalized American, song composer. A collection of his Yiddish songs was published by Metro Music in 1936.
