= Outlasting the Blues =

Studio album by Arlo Guthrie
- Released: June 1979
- Recorded: January–March 1979
- Genre: Folk rock, popular, country
- Length: 36:05
- Label: Warner Bros.
- Producer: John Pilla

Arlo Guthrie chronology
One Night (1978)	Outlasting the Blues (1979)	Power of Love (1981)

Outlasting the Blues is the tenth studio album by American singer-songwriter Arlo Guthrie, released in June 1979 by Warner Bros. Records (BSK 3336). Produced by John Pilla and recorded from January to March 1979 with Guthrie's touring band Shenandoah, the album consists of songs about mortality, spirituality, love, and the passing of time.

== Background ==
By the late 1970s, Guthrie had lost his father Woody Guthrie to Huntington's chorea, and all four of his older siblings had also died, including two sisters who died of the same disease in their 30s. As he approached an age when he would find out whether or not he would develop the disease and similarly face an early death (he would not and remains alive and well several decades later), he spent much of his time in serious introspection searching meaning and a way forward. Guthrie, who had been raised in the Jewish faith of his mother, converted to Christianity as a Roman Catholic. Outlasting the Blues consists of several songs in which his newfound faith figures prominently.

In a 2004 interview, Guthrie spoke about spirituality and the role it plays in his life and on Outlasting the Blues.

I'm not a big fan of overly happy spirituality ... Life ain’t happy all the time. For me, spirituality is not about being happy. It's about what to do when times are tough, not just for you personally but for everybody. There are times when disasters strike ... So, for me, spirituality is what to do about that, and then what to do in your own personal life when you're confronting things that hurt, things that ain't fun. Outlasting the Blues was about that. It was not about preachin', it was not about telling people what's right, although there's a little bit about what I found was right.

In 2020, Guthrie described music of faith as the ultimate form of protest music: "If this world ain’t doing it for you, and your hopes are in the next one — you can’t get more protest than that."

== Recording and production ==
Most of the songs on Outlasting the Blues were written and recorded during the first three months of 1979. Guthrie and producer John Pilla, who had produced Guthrie's successful album Amigo, decided not to record in Los Angeles with session musicians, which had been the approach taken on the artist's previous albums. Instead, Outlasting the Blues was recorded and mixed at Long View Farm Studios in North Brookfield, Massachusetts, close to Guthrie's home. For the recording sessions, Pilla drew upon the talents of Guthrie's touring band, Shenandoah, and members of a local string orchestra. Recording needed to be complete by the end of March in time for Guthrie's upcoming European tour in the spring.

== Release and promotion ==
Outlasting the Blues was released in the United States in June 1979. Unlike his recent albums, which were released with relatively little promotion, Outlasting the Blues was aggressively marketed by Warner Bros., who arranged numerous interviews with high-profile media outlets in the first months after the release. On July 20, Guthrie and his touring band Shenandoah performed a concert in West Hempstead, Long Island, New York, which was broadcast live in its entirety on WLIR-FM. The following night, July 21, they performed at the Dr. Pepper Music Festival at the Wollman Rink in Central Park in New York City—a concert that was broadcast live by WPLJ-FM to more than a million radio listeners. During these shows, Guthrie performed several songs from his new album, including "Prologue", "Which Side", and "Sailing Down My Golden River".

== Musical style and composition ==
=== Side one ===
Outlasting the Blues consists of eleven songs, nine of which were written by Guthrie. The first side of the album opens with "Prologue" and the declaration, "In the event of my demise, be sure to include this statement ..." The up-tempo number establishes the album's themes of facing mortality—for Guthrie the very real threat of inherited Huntington's disease—and rejecting the illusions of his past. Looking back on his experiences in the 1960s, Guthrie warns his former companions still clinging to those illusions that they too have been sold in the marketplace of idealism. The idealistic demonstrations, material wealth, drugs—Guthrie has rejected all of these: "Everything then has now passed away, except for the love in my heart."

The minor key rocker "Which Side" begins as a typical 1960s protest song or an old union song, but by the third verse it is clear that the choice presented is a spiritual one involving the soul. Guthrie uses the Biblical scene on Calvary to drive home the point. One of the "local thieves" crucified with Jesus asks what will happen after death, and Jesus responds that it all depends "which side are you on". For Guthrie, the choice is clear: "And me myself I'm satisfied to sing for God's own son". Biblical settings are retained in "Wedding Song", which shifts between the Genesis story of Adam and Eve, the songwriter's own wedding, the wedding of Mary and Joseph, and finally, after years of married life, the singer's preparation to attend another wedding. The healing comfort of married life is captured in casual moments of warm domesticity: "Ain't it something just to lie here in bed, just me and you, outlasting the blues". "World Away from Me" continues the theme of domesticity as a healing sanctuary from a life on the road.

And it's so good to come home to a woman all alone
Forgeting how hard loneliness can be
She will take me from this world
Then she'll gently take the world away from me

After establishing that it's "useless to be living without love", Guthrie closes the first side with "Epilogue", a "poignant baring of the soul by a man sure of his faith, if not his future, while at the same time at ease with his past". In this quiet dirge-like ballad, supported by electric piano and acoustic guitar, Guthrie has no regrets about his past as he explores his memories, these "stolen moments from the hourglass".

And all my memories seem to come alive
I think of everyone who still survives
And those who haven't may yet still arrive

Again Guthrie is remembering his former companions with love, hope, and genuine concern for their well-being, and confesses that despite his difficulty through the years sharing his feelings with them, he still loves them. With his future uncertain, Guthrie can only place his faith in God, presented in the image of a "sparrow" (perhaps the Holy Spirit) in the final verse:

I sit alone and hear the sparrow sing
No way of knowing what tomorrow brings
I leave my solitude upon his wings

=== Side two ===
The second side of Outlasting the Blues opens with the rollicking up-tempo "Telephone" about the absurd intrusion of technology (and strangers) in the singer's life. "Sailing Down This Golden River", written by Pete Seeger, captures on one level the simple joys of experiencing the natural world. In the context of this album, however, the images of sun and water and distant stars also take on spiritual connotations. The driving rocker "Carry Me Over" presents a prayer to escape the "twisted maze of old highways" of the singer's life on the road and to transcend the loneliness in his life.

Guthrie then transitions to the grave a cappella "Underground", which revisits the theme of mortality:

There's a river running underground that rolls along the clay
That took my body when I laid it down and carried it far away
It's too damned dark for you to see, so I did not protest
My soul shook free, you can't have me, but you may keep the rest

In "Drowning Man", Guthrie looks back at the point of his conversion and considers his weakness now and the ever-present threat of losing his faith. Despite the promises made at his conversion, the singer finds no solace in that memory. He invokes the Biblical passage of Saint Peter denying Jesus three times:

I remember when I met you underneath the evening sky
Now it seems I could forget you, rescue me, I'm bound to die
I'm going down for the third time and I need a helping hand
The rooster crows and I'm sinking, heart of stone, drowning man

The singer's plea is honest and filled with urgency.

It's too late for new beginnings in this world I've left behind
There is nothing left worth keeping, not a thing to change my mind
Did you know from the beginning that I'd dig this lousy hole
Oh, don't leave me here abandoned in this dark night of the soul

Guthrie closes the album with Hoyt Axton's moderate country ballad "Evangeline", which revisits the theme of domesticity and water as a symbol of life and healing.

I dream in the morning that she brings me water
And I dream in evening that she brings me wine
Just a poor man's daughter from Puerto Penasco
Evangelina in old Mexico

== Artwork and packaging ==
The cover of Outlasting the Blues has a black and white photo in sepia tone of Guthrie dressed in a flannel shirt and jeans, standing in profile, holding a saxophone, and looking out toward the camera. The title of the album is presented in capital letters along the right side of the cover. The original uncropped photo was used in promotional material distributed to the music press, magazines, and newspapers. The back cover has a photo of Guthrie's touring band, Shenandoah, gathered near an open doorway, showing Steve Ide (seated), David Grover (standing), Dan Velika and Carol Ide (standing in the doorway), and Terry A La Berry (partially hidden in shadow). The white album sleeve contains the song lyrics and album credits.

== Critical reception ==
Professional ratings
Review scores
Source	Rating
AllMusic	4/5 stars
Christgau's Record Guide	B
MusicHound Folk: The Essential Album Guide	4/5 stars

Upon its release in June 1979, Outlasting the Blues received mostly positive reviews. In his review for Rolling Stone magazine, Dave Marsh wrote, "Guthrie finally resolves the tensions between folk and rock, meaning mostly that he has put together some tough music ... to complement some of his most unsettling songs ever". Marsh concluded that Outlasting the Blues was "among the finest records ... [Guthrie] has ever made". The music critic for the Christian Science Monitor wrote, "In a world of cloned Top 40 hits ... every song on this album has the unusual quality of sounding distinctive." In his review for Rolling Stone magazine, Ken Tucker, while criticizing Shenandoah's "bar-band instrumental support", felt the album was a "small masterwork of writing and programming". The album also received some negative reviews at the time. The Montreal Gazette criticized Guthrie's "wretched, grating wailing on most cuts".

In his review for AllMusic, Brett Hartenbach gave the album a mixed review, noting that while the production lacked the vitality of producer John Pilla's earlier Guthrie effort, Amigo, much of the material is "first rate" and that "the first five songs are among Guthrie's best". The central themes of the album are mortality, fate, and the power of religious faith.

He was also approaching the age where he would discover whether or not he would be struck with Huntington's chorea, the hereditary nerve disease that killed his father. Outlasting the Blues deals with this sense of mortality, as well as faith, family, and time gone by. Guthrie refuses to ignore his possible fate, while examining the way things are, were, and should be.

Hartenbach concluded that "despite its flaws, there's plenty to admire about Outlasting the Blues, which, at its best, is about as honest and mature as folk or pop songwriting gets". The album received four out of five stars on the AllMusic website.

In Christgau's Record Guide: Rock Albums of the Seventies (1981), Robert Christgau wrote:

These reflections on God, love, and death are substantial and obviously earned, but too often they're just not acute. The problem isn't his religious overview, either ... Guthrie simply goes soft aesthetically at crucial moments, and although most of the material is creditable enough, only once [on "Epilogue"] is the enormous emotional potential of the project realized.

== Track listing ==
All tracks are written by Arlo Guthrie, except where noted.

No.	Title	Writer(s)	Length
1.	"Prologue"		3:37
2.	"Which Side"		4:20
3.	"Wedding Song"		3:56
4.	"World Away from Me"		3:29
5.	"Epilogue"		3:02
6.	"Telephone"		2:07
7.	"Sailing Down My Golden River"	Pete Seeger	3:07
8.	"Carry Me Over"		3:08
9.	"Underground"		1:21
10.	"Drowning Man"		3:34
11.	"Evangelina"	Hoyt Axton, Kenneth Higginbotham	4:22
Total length:			36:05

== Personnel ==
Music

- Arlo Guthrie – vocals, guitar, saxophone, string arrangements
- Peter Adams – steel guitar
- Terry A La Berry – drums, marimba, vocals
- Thomas Austin – cello
- Dave Brooks – violin
- John Culpo – accordion
- David Darling – cello
- Mic Gillette – violin
- David Grover – banjo, guitar, string arrangements, vocals
- Helen Huybrechts – viola
- Carol Ide – guitar, percussion, vocals
- Steve Ide – guitar, trombone, vocals
- Gordon Johnson – bass, string section leader
- John Pilla – cymbals, finger cymbals, guitar, vocals
- John Sauer – keyboards
- Ann Saughnessy – violin
- Ron Sloan – harmonica
- Dan Velika – bass, guitar, vocals
- Paul Yarbrough – viola

Production

- John Pilla – producer, photography
- Les Kahn – engineer
- Jesse Henderson – assistant engineer

== Release history ==
Region	Year	Label	Format	Catalog
United States	1979	Warner Bros. Records	LP	BSK 3336
United States	1991	Rising Son	Cassette	RSR 3336
United States	2005	Rising Son	CD	RSR 3336
United States	2010	Rising Son	MP3 (remastered)	RSR 3336
United Kingdom	1979	Warner Bros. Records	LP	K 56658
Canada	1979	Warner Bros. Records	LP	QBS 3336
Australia	1979	Warner Bros. Records	LP	BSK 3336
Germany	1979	Warner Bros. Records	LP	WB 56 658
Italy	1979	Warner Bros. Records	LP	W 56658
