= Washington County (album) =

Studio album by Arlo Guthrie
- Released: October 1970
- Recorded: August 1970
- Genre: Folk, folk rock
- Length: 36:23
- Label: Reprise
- Producer: Lenny Waronker, John Pilla

Arlo Guthrie chronology
Running Down the Road (1969)	Washington County (1970)	Hobo's Lullaby (1972)

Washington County is the third studio album by the American folk singer Arlo Guthrie, released in 1970. It peaked at No. 33 on the Billboard charts on December 4, 1970, and No. 28 in Australia. The single "Valley to Pray" became Guthrie's only chart success in Australia, reaching No. 11 on its chart.

== Critical reception ==
Professional ratings
Review scores
Source	Rating
AllMusic	3.5/5 stars
Christgau's Record Guide	B−
The Encyclopedia of Popular Music	3/5 stars
The New Rolling Stone Album Guide	3/5 stars

Contributing to Magnet, Bar/None owner Glenn Morrow called the album "remarkably eclectic". He praised "Gabriel's Mother's Highway Ballad #16 Blues", writing that it "wraps around the listener like a sonic temple—a place of peace and well-being, bracing out the cold winds of a hostile world".

== Compilations and covers ==
"Gabriel's Mother's Highway Ballad #16 Blues" was later included on the 1977 compilation The Best of Arlo Guthrie. A cover version of it became the title track of the 1972 Franciscus Henri album Gabriel's Mother's Highway.

== Track listing ==
All tracks composed by Arlo Guthrie, except where indicated.

Side one

1. "Introduction" – 3:22
2. "Fencepost Blues" (sometimes rendered as "Fence Post Blues") – 3:11
3. "Gabriel's Mother's Highway Ballad #16 Blues" – 6:23
4. "Washington County" – 1:59
5. "Valley to Pray" – 2:46 (Doc Coutson, John Pilla, Arlo Guthrie)

Side two

1. "Lay Down Little Doggies" (Woody Guthrie) – 3:18
2. "I Could Be Singing" – 3:19
3. "If You Would Just Drop By" – 4:23
4. "Percy's Song" (Bob Dylan) – 4:57
5. "I Want to Be Around" – 2:45

== Personnel ==
- Arlo Guthrie – banjo, guitar, piano, autoharp, harmonica, vocals
- Hoyt Axton – bass vocals
- Ry Cooder – slide guitar
- Doug Dillard – banjo
- Chris Ethridge – bass guitar
- Richie Hayward – drums
- John Pilla – guitar, autoharp, harmony vocals
- Gary Walters – bass guitar
- Clarence White – electric guitar

Technical

- Barry Feldman – executive producer
- Van Dyke Parks – co-producer on "Valley to Pray"
