= The Motorcycle Song =

1967 song by Arlo Guthrie

Song by Arlo Guthrie

from the album Alice's Restaurant
- Released: October 1967
- Genre: Talking blues; folk
- Length: 2:58
- Label: Reprise
- Producer: Fred Hellerman

Audio
- "The Motorcycle Song" on YouTube

"The Motorcycle Song" is a folk and comedic talking blues song by American singer-songwriter Arlo Guthrie. It was originally released on his 1967 album, Alice's Restaurant, with an extended version released on his 1968 live studio album, Arlo. Guthrie further expanded on the song, with "The Motorcycle Song-an Education" on his 2005 live album Live in Sydney and with "The Unbelievable Motorcycle Tale" on his 2009 live album Tales of ’69. The song includes a humorous rhyme scheme, with extended versions providing exaggerated storytelling elements.

== Story ==
In the original version of the song, Guthrie sings about recent visits to his friends, Ray and Mike, who proclaim they do not want a pickle, a tickle, or to die and that they only wants to ride their motorcycles. Through pronunciation, Guthrie ensures the three things they do not want rhyme with the word 'motorcycle':

I don't want a pickle
I just want to on ride my motorsickle
I don't want a tickle
I just want to ride on my motorsickle
And I don't want to die
I just wanna ride on my motorcy ... cle

In the first extended version of the song, released in 1968, Guthrie explains "the significance of the pickle" and history of the song. He describes a time when he was driving 150 miles per hour (240 km/h) on a mountain road while songwriting. After a string breaks off his guitar, he drives off the side of a cliff. While falling through the air, he writes what he believes will be his last song, recounting the song's chorus. At the bottom of the hill, he lands on a cop car, then runs into town and sees a man eating a large pickle, which seems to be wiretapped. While the man is asking Guthrie questions, a cop approaches, who appears to have been squashed, presumably by Guthrie's motorcycle. The officer throws the pickle in the air, shoots it, catches it on his toe, then fills the bullet hole with a ticket before shoving the pickle down Guthrie's throat. The song ends with by repeating the original chorus.

In "The Motorcycle Song-an Education", released in 2005, Guthrie shares more about the background writing the song, including how he tried to avoid being drafted into the military by continuing his education. While pursuing education in Massachusetts, he says, he wrote "The Motorcycle Song". He also provides additional improbable history about the song.

"The Unbelievable Motorcycle Tale", released in 2009, includes the original song lyrics with Ray and Mike, as well as new lyrics. In this version, he's still riding his motorcycle down a mountain road going 150 mph while playing his guitar but this time, he is accompanied by Bob on the bass guitar. He also makes more direct reference to the police officers who may be in the crowd at the concert, as well as many recent arrests. He does not include the part of the story where the cop shoots the pickle.

While singing extended versions of the song, particularly in concerts, Guthrie often comments on how improbable it is for him to have been performing such a poorly-written written song for so many years.

== Release history ==
"The Motorcycle Song" was originally released on Guthrie's October 1967 album, Alice's Restaurant, then as a two-side single in December of the same year. The A-side of the album included the song, referred to as "Part 1", while the B-side included the story behind the song, referred to as "Part 2". An extended version of "The Motorcycle Song" was released on Guthrie's 1968 live studio album, Arlo. He further expanded on the song, with "The Motorcycle Song-an Education" on his 2005 live album Live in Sydney. With "The Unbelievable Motorcycle Tale", from his 2009 live album Tales of ’69, Guthrie included both the original and expanded lyrics.

The original version is included on Alice's Restaurant: The Massacree Revisited, a live album released in 1996, and the original extended version appears on the 1977 compilation album, The Best of Arlo Guthrie.

== Characteristics ==
The original version of "The Motorcycle Song" is just under three minutes in length, in which Guthrie sings two verses and three iterations of the chorus. The chorus involves Guthrie rhyming the words 'pickle', 'tickle', and 'die' with 'motorcycle', with the stanzas including rhyming endings for his friends' names, Ray and Mike.

Following the success of Guthrie's 18-minute long, rambling storytelling song "Alice's Restaurant", also from the Alice's Restaurant album, Guthrie introduced more storytelling into "The Motorcycle Song", with the Arlo release being almost 8 minutes long and including discussion about "the significance of the pickle". This version includes the original chorus but none of the verses from the original. Over several decades, Guthrie continuing performing and releasing versions of this edition of the song, rather than the original.

Later versions of the song include a talking blues style of singing and storytelling, which had been adopted by Guthrie's father, Woody Guthrie after being developed by African-American artists.

== Analysis ==
Early in his career, Guthrie indicated that he did not want "The Motorcycle Song" to be deeply interpreted, though he later withdrew the sentiment.

=== Cultural analysis ===
"The Motorcycle Song" connected the hippie and motorcycling counter-cultures of the 1960s. While motorcycle culture is often conflated with danger and rebellion, "The Motorcycle Song" portrays a motorcyclist who is "an easy-going, ironic, laid-back storyteller who speaks in the vocabulary of sixties hippie culture". Dean specifically connects this modern disconnect of cultures to the specific timeframe in which the song was written, in which both motorcyclists and hippies were part of a similar counterculture with hopes of escaping rather than deliberately opposing mainstream culture. While this connection is tenuous, even for the time, Dean notes that both groups were the focus of attention from law enforcement, a theme that arises in both "The Motorcycle Song" and "Alice's Restaurant".

Extended versions of "The Motorcycle Song" also reference government over reach through the man eating the seemingly wiretapped pickle. Among other potential meanings, the seemingly wiretapped pickle may reference the presence of law enforcement at Guthrie's own shows, which is also referenced in "The Pause of Mr. Claus", also released on Arlo. Guthrie claims his shows were targeted by law enforcement due to the presence of illegal drugs and communists.

=== Rhyme scheme ===
Misao Dean, writing for International Journal of Motorcycle Studies, discusses Guthrie's use of rhyme in "The Motorcycle Song", as Guthrie attempts to rhyme the words 'pickle', 'tickle', and 'die' with 'motorcycle'. This includes pronouncing motorcycle as 'motorsickle' and including a long pause: 'motorcy---cle.' Dean writes, "These lines create the impression of a songwriter obliged to use rhythm and mispronunciation to torture various nonsensical words into a semblance of full rhyme." With later productions, Guthrie placed greater emphasis on the absurdity of these lines, such as by increasing the length of the pause. However, the overarching forced rhyming scheme is more apparent in the original version of the song, with each stanza rhyming, rather than just the chorus. Dean explains that "these verses carry out the impression of a songwriter whose limited abilities are challenged by an elementary requirement like end-rhyme".

Dean specifically discusses when Guthrie rhymes 'die' with 'motorcycle', with a long pause. Dean notes that this line in the song, which includes a drawn out vocalization of 'I', may have resonated with men fearing the Vietnam War draft. The line not only focuses on the lyric "I don't wanna die", but also includes a word cut short before cutting, which could reference a life cut short.

== Legacy ==
"The Motorcycle Song" has been featured in various media. In 1980, it was included in Peter Starr's film Take It to the Limit. In 1992, it featured in Kathleen Krull's Gonna Sing My Head Off: American Folk Songs for Children.
