= Mystic Journey (album) =

Studio album by Arlo Guthrie
- Released: 1996
- Studio: Derek
- Genre: Folk rock
- Label: Rising Son
- Producers: Arlo Guthrie, Abe Guthrie

Arlo Guthrie chronology
Alice's Restaurant: The Massacree Revisited (1996)	Mystic Journey (1996)	This Land Is Your Land: An All American Children's Folk Classic (1997)

Mystic Journey is an album by the American musician Arlo Guthrie, released in 1996. It was Guthrie's first album of mostly new material in a decade. It is dedicated to Ma Jaya Sati Bhagavati, Guthrie's Hindu guru.

== Production ==
The album was produced by Guthrie and his son, Abe. Cyril Pahinui played on the album. The songs were in part inspired by Guthrie's work as a hospice volunteer. Many were written three to four years before the recording sessions. "Moon Song" was written for The Byrds of Paradise, on which Guthrie starred.

== Critical reception ==
Professional ratings
Review scores
Source	Rating
AllMusic	3/5 stars
The Encyclopedia of Popular Music	3/5 stars
MusicHound Rock: The Essential Album Guide	3.5/5 stars
(The New) Rolling Stone Album Guide	3/5 stars

The Washington Post wrote that, "derivative as they are, these tunes nonetheless possess a charm of their own, and Guthrie slides into them as if they were an old pair of slippers." The Wisconsin State Journal called Mystic Journey "an intimate, acoustic album about love, family and spiritualism."

The Independent deemed "Doors to Heaven" "a well-meaning but horribly 'Imagine'-esque piece of whimsy." The Toronto Star stated that "Arlo continues his life mission of slyly confounding fans and foes alike... This time around, it's done by recording a rootsy, folk rocking set of tunes, a long haul from the gently paced acoustic album most fans likely expected." The Gazette determined that the album "contains relatively innocuous love songs for the Prairie Home Companion set."

AllMusic wrote that "the lyrics also had a Dylanish twinge in their highly poetic, sometimes obscure language, though Guthrie commented on a variety of contemporary issues." MusicHound Rock: The Essential Album Guide considered the album "a richly crafted and introspective record that shows he's hardly played out."

== Track listing ==
No.	Title	Length
1.	"Moon Song"
2.	"Face of Time"
3.	"The Mystic Journey"
4.	"Under Cover of Night"
5.	"You Are the Song"
6.	"Doors to Heaven"
7.	"Wake Up Dead"
8.	"When a Soldier Makes It Home"
9.	"Stairs"
10.	"All This Stuff Takes Time"
11.	"I'll Be with You Tonight"

== Personnel ==
- Arlo Guthrie - Vocals, guitar, harmonica
- Abe Guthrie – Hammond B-3 organ, keyboards, co-producer
- Cyril Pahinui – Guitar ("Moon Song")
- Darren Todd – Bass
- Terry A La Berry – Drums
- Jason Webster – Electric guitar
- Steve Ide – Electric and acoustic guitars, trombone
- Ed Gerhard – Guitar
- Greg Steele – Percussion, engineer
- Charlie Tokarz – Saxophone
- Jeff Stevens – Trumpet
- Sean Hurley – Bass guitar
- David Grover – Guitar
