= Hobo's Lullaby (album) =

Studio album by Arlo Guthrie
- Released: April 1972
- Recorded: October–December 1971
- Genre: Folk, folk rock
- Length: 37:20
- Label: Reprise
- Producer: Lenny Waronker, John Pilla

Arlo Guthrie chronology
Washington County (1970)	Hobo's Lullaby (1972)	Last of the Brooklyn Cowboys (1973)

Professional ratings
Review scores
Source	Rating
AllMusic	4/5 stars
Billboard	(favorable)
Christgau's Record Guide	B+
The New York Times	(favorable)
The Rolling Stone Album Guide	3/5 stars

Hobo's Lullaby is the fourth studio album by the American folk singer Arlo Guthrie. It was released in 1972 on Reprise Records. It was re-released on Rising Son Records in 1997. The album contains Guthrie's only Top 40 hit, a cover of Steve Goodman's "City of New Orleans".

== Track listing ==
No.	Title	Writer(s)	Length
1.	"Anytime"	Herbert Lawson	1:46
2.	"The City of New Orleans"	Steve Goodman	4:31
3.	"Lightning Bar Blues"	Hoyt Axton	2:47
4.	"Shackles and Chains"	Jimmie Davis	2:49
5.	"1913 Massacre"	Woody Guthrie	4:15
6.	"Somebody Turned on the Light"	Hoyt Axton	3:13
7.	"Ukulele Lady"	Richard A. Whiting, Gus Kahn	3:21
8.	"When the Ship Comes In"	Bob Dylan	4:24
9.	"Mapleview (20%) Rag"	Arlo Guthrie	2:05
10.	"Days Are Short"	Arlo Guthrie	4:15
11.	"Hobo's Lullaby"	Goebel Reeves	3:57

== Personnel ==
- Arlo Guthrie – vocals, guitar
- Hoyt Axton – vocals
- Max Bennett – bass guitar
- Byron Berline – mandolin, fiddle
- Roger Bush – bass guitar
- Cozy Cole – drums
- Ry Cooder – guitar
- John Craviotto – drums
- Nick DeCaro – vocals, accordion on "City of New Orleans"
- Jim Dickinson – keyboards
- Doug Dillard – banjo
- Chris Ethridge – bass guitar
- Wilton Felder – tenor saxophone
- Venetta Fields – vocals
- Anne Goodman – cello
- Gib Guilbeau – fiddle
- Richie Hayward – drums
- Jim Keltner – drums
- Clydie King – vocals
- Bill Lee – bass guitar
- Thad Maxwell – guitar
- Gene Merlino – vocals
- Arnie Moore – bass
- Gimmer Nicholson – guitar
- Spooner Oldham – keyboards
- Thurl Ravenscroft – vocals
- Fritz Richmond – bass guitar
- Linda Ronstadt – vocals
- Jessica Smith – vocals
- Clarence White – guitar

=== Production ===
- Lenny Waronker, John Pilla - producer
- Donn Landee - engineer
- John Pilla - photography
