= Arlo Guthrie (album) =

Studio album by Arlo Guthrie
- Released: June 1974
- Genre: Folk
- Length: 31:03
- Label: Reprise, Rising Son
- Producer: Lenny Waronker, John Pilla

Arlo Guthrie chronology
Last of the Brooklyn Cowboys (1973)	Arlo Guthrie (1974)	Together in Concert (1975)

Professional ratings
Review scores
Source	Rating
AllMusic	3.5/5 stars
Christgau's Record Guide	B+

Arlo Guthrie is the epynomous sixth studio album by the folk singer Arlo Guthrie.

== Track listing ==
All tracks composed by Arlo Guthrie; except where indicated

1. "Won't Be Long"
2. "Presidential Rag"
3. "Deportees" (Woody Guthrie, Martin Hoffman)
4. "Children of Abraham"
5. "Nostalgia Rag"
6. "When the Cactus Is in Bloom" (Jimmie Rodgers)
7. "Me and My Goose"
8. "Bling Blang" (Woody Guthrie, from Songs to Grow on for Mother and Child)
9. "Go Down Moses" (traditional, arranged by Arlo Guthrie)
10. "Hard Times"
11. "Last to Leave"

== Personnel ==
- Byron Berline - Fiddle
- George Bohanon - Arranger
- Roger Bush - Bass
- Bob Cato - Unknown Contributor Role
- James Cleveland - Choir Master
- Ry Cooder - Guitar
- Jesse Ed Davis - Guitar
- Nick DeCaro - Accordion, Strings
- Doug Dillard - Banjo
- Buddy Emmons - Pedal Steel Guitar
- Chris Ethridge - Bass
- Wilton Felder - Unknown Contributor Role
- Barry Feldman - Executive Producer
- Jim Gordon - Drums
- Arlo Guthrie - Guitar, Vocals
- Lee Herschberg - Engineer
- Milt Holland - Unknown Contributor Role
- Jim Keltner - Drums
- Clydie King - Vocals
- Donn Landee - Engineer
- Judy Maizel - Assistant Producer
- Thomas Molesky - Design
- Spooner Oldham - Keyboards
- John Pilla - Guitar, Photography, Producer
- Jessica Smith - Vocals
- Southern California Community Choir - Choir/Chorus
- Lenny Waronker - Producer
