= Urban Milwaukee =

Online magazine based in Milwaukee, Wisconsin

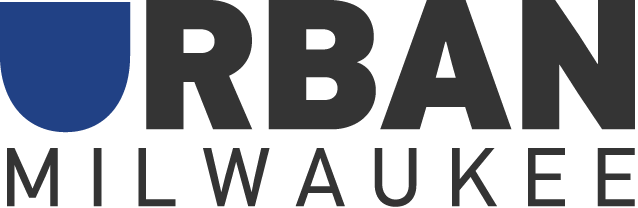
- Website type: Political/Real-Estate Development news
- Available in: English
- Creators: Jeramey Jannene, Dave Reid, Bruce Murphy
- President: Jeramey Jannene
- Key people: Dave Reid; (Publisher and Co-Founder); Bruce Murphy; (Editor)
- Website: urbanmilwaukee.com
- Launched: 2008

Urban Milwaukee is an online daily that provides real estate, politics, arts and entertainment news about Milwaukee, Wisconsin. The site publishes 5 to 10 daily articles covering city council hearings, investigative journalism, real estate developments, along with a wide range of entertainment news, from dining and the arts to movies, music, and sports, all related to Milwaukee.

== History ==
Urban Milwaukee was founded in 2008 by Jeramey Jannene and Dave Reid. Bruce Murphy joined Urban Milwaukee as their editor in 2012. Bruce Murphy was formerly the editor of Milwaukee Magazine and a senior reporter at the Milwaukee Journal Sentinel. The publication acquired Third Coast Daily in 2013. Their offices are located at 755 N. Milwaukee Street in the historic Colby Abbot Building. Urban Milwaukee also operates a small retail outlet which sells Milwaukee themed souvenirs and gifts.

Urban Milwaukee and its writer have won a number of Milwaukee Press Club awards. Its coverage of city government and other Milwaukee issues has been recognized by other local and national outlets. As of 2013, the site had 150,000 monthly visits.

The publication will often post stories from Wisconsin Public Radio, Milwaukee Neighborhood News Service and the Wisconsin Examiner.

== Reporters and contributors ==
- Jeramey Jannene
- Bruce Murphy
- Graham Kilmer
- Michael Holloway
- Steven Walters
- Bruce Thompson
- Rose Balistreri
- Tom Bamberger
