= Arlo (album) =

Live album by Arlo Guthrie
- Released: July 22, 1968
- Venues: The Bitter End, New York City
- Genre: Folk
- Length: 32:36
- Label: Rising Son/Koch
- Producer: Fred Hellerman

Arlo Guthrie chronology
Alice's Restaurant (1967)	Arlo (1968)	Running Down the Road (1969)

Professional ratings
Review scores
Source	Rating
AllMusic	3/5 stars
Rolling Stone	negative

Arlo is a 1968 live album by American folk singer Arlo Guthrie.

== Track listing ==
All tracks composed by Arlo Guthrie; except where indicated

1. "The Motorcycle Song" – 7:56
2. "Wouldn't You Believe It" – 3:03
3. "Try Me One More Time" (Ernest Tubb)– 2:13
4. "John Looked Down" – 2:22
5. "Meditation (Wave upon Wave)" – 6:38
6. "Standing at the Threshold" – 2:34
7. "The Pause of Mr. Claus" – 7:50

== Personnel ==
- Arlo Guthrie – vocals, guitar
- Ed Shaughnessy – drums, tabla
- Stan Free – piano, harpsichord
- Bob Arkin – bass

Technical

- Tory Brainard – recording engineer
- Bill Szymczyk – mixing engineer
- Henry Diltz – cover photography
