= Massachusetts (Arlo Guthrie song) =

1976 song by Arlo Guthrie

"Massachusetts" is a song with words and music by Arlo Guthrie. The song, originally released as a cut on Guthrie's 1976 album Amigo, was adopted by the Legislature in July 1981 as the official folk song of the Commonwealth of Massachusetts.
