= Amigo (Arlo Guthrie album) =

Studio album by Arlo Guthrie
- Released: August 1976
- Studios: Warner Bros., North Hollywood
- Genre: Folk
- Label: Reprise
- Producer: John Pilla

Arlo Guthrie chronology
| Together in Concert (1975) | Amigo (1976) | The Best of Arlo Guthrie (1977) |

Professional ratings
Review scores
| Source | Rating |
|---|---|
| AllMusic | 4.5/5 stars |
| Billboard | (favorable) |
| Christgau's Record Guide | A− |
| Los Angeles Times | (mixed) |
| The Rolling Stone Record Guide | 5/5 stars |

Amigo is a 1976 album by Arlo Guthrie. It is his seventh studio album. The album peaked at No. 133 on the Billboard 200.

== Track listing ==
All tracks composed by Arlo Guthrie; except where indicated

Side one

1. "Guabi Guabi" – 2:27
2. "Darkest Hour" – 4:04
3. "Massachusetts" – 3:10
4. "Victor Jara" (lyrics: Adrian Mitchell) – 4:17
5. "Patriots' Dream" – 2:51

Side two

1. "Grocery Blues" – 2:09
2. "Walking Song" (Leah Kunkel) – 3:08
3. "My Love" – 2:43
4. "Manzanillo Bay" (Rob "Rabbit" Mackay) – 4:24
5. "Ocean Crossing" – 3:22
6. "Connection" (Mick Jagger, Keith Richards) – 2:40

== Personnel ==
- Bob Glaub – bass
- Nick DeCaro – strings, accordion
- Bill Green – guitar
- Arlo Guthrie – guitar, harmonica, vocals
- Milt Holland – percussion
- Dr. Rick Jaeger – drums
- Leah Kunkel – keyboards, electric piano, vocals
- Russ Kunkel – percussion, drums
- Gayle LeVant – harp
- Linda Ronstadt – vocals
- Dan Velika – bass
- Waddy Wachtel – guitar
- Jai Winding – keyboards

Additional personnel

- Lloyd Cliff – engineer
- Donn Landee – engineer
- John Pilla – producer
- Lenny Waronker – producer
