= Running Down the Road =

Studio album by Arlo Guthrie
- Released: 1969
- Genre: Folk, folk rock
- Length: 34:25
- Label: Reprise
- Producer: Lenny Waronker, Van Dyke Parks

Arlo Guthrie chronology
Arlo (1968)	Running Down the Road (1969)	Washington County (1970)

Professional ratings
Review scores
Source	Rating
AllMusic	2.5/5 stars
Robert Christgau	A
Rolling Stone	(favourable)

Running Down the Road is the second studio album by American folk singer Arlo Guthrie. Guthrie's version of the traditional folk tune "Stealin'" was featured in the film Two-Lane Blacktop. The cover shows the artist upon a Triumph TR6 Trophy motorcycle which is also pictured in the album's 'gate'. Clarence White and Gene Parsons from the then current lineup of The Byrds played on some tracks.

== Track listing ==
All tracks composed by Arlo Guthrie; except where noted. "Coming into Los Angeles" is the first song on side-B of the original album.

A-side
No.	Title	Length
1.	"Oklahoma Hills" (composed by Woody Guthrie and Jack Guthrie)	3:26
2.	"Every Hand in the Land"	2:18
3.	"Creole Belle" (composed by Mississippi John Hurt)	3:43
4.	"Wheel of Fortune"	2:28
5.	"Oh, in the Morning"	4:51

B-side
No.	Title	Length
1.	"Coming in to Los Angeles"	3:04
2.	"Stealin'" (authors unknown)	2:46
3.	"My Front Pages"	3:46
4.	"Living in the Country" (composed by Pete Seeger)	3:16
5.	"Running Down the Road"	4:29

== Personnel ==
Musicians

- Arlo Guthrie – vocals, guitar, piano
- Clarence White – guitar
- Ry Cooder – guitar, mandolin, bass
- Gene Parsons – drums, guitar, harmonica
- James Burton – guitar
- Chris Ethridge – bass
- Milt Holland – percussion
- Jerry Scheff – bass
- John Pilla – guitar
- Jim Gordon – drums

Technical

- Barry Feldman – executive producer
- Lenny Waronker, Van Dyke Parks – producers
- Doug Botnick – engineer
- Donn Landee, John Pilia – assistant engineers
- Ed Thrasher – art direction
- Henry Diltz – cover photography
