= Last of the Brooklyn Cowboys =

Studio album by Arlo Guthrie
- Released: April 1973
- Recorded: 1973
- Studio: Warner Bros., Hollywood, California
- Genre: Folk, folk rock
- Length: 32:36
- Label: Reprise
- Producer: Lenny Waronker, John Pilla

Arlo Guthrie chronology
Hobo's Lullaby (1972)	Last of the Brooklyn Cowboys (1973)	Arlo Guthrie (1974)

Professional ratings
Review scores
Source	Rating
AllMusic	4/5 stars
Billboard	(favorable)
Christgau's Record Guide	B
Gay News	(favorable)
Los Angeles Times	(favorable)
The Rolling Stone Album Guide	3/5 stars
The Washington Post	(favorable)

Last of the Brooklyn Cowboys is a 1973 album by the American singer-songwriter Arlo Guthrie. The title was borrowed from a nickname given to Ramblin' Jack Elliott. Although not intended as a concept album, Guthrie recorded it with the goal of evoking a particular, "mythical" place and era, which he also intended to embody in the cover art.

== Track listing ==
All tracks composed by Arlo Guthrie; except where indicated

1. "Farrell O'Gara" (Traditional) – 2:49
2. "Gypsy Davy" (Traditional, Woody Guthrie) – 3:44
3. "This Troubled Mind of Mine" (Ernest Tubb, Johnny Tyler) – 2:27
4. "Week on the Rag" – 2:23
5. "Miss the Mississippi and You" ([William Heagney]) – 2:55
6. "Lovesick Blues" (Irving Mills, Cliff Friend) – 2:35
7. "Uncle Jeff" – 0:56
8. "Gates of Eden" (Bob Dylan) – 5:16
9. "Last Train" – 3:06
10. "Cowboy Song" – 3:42
11. "Sailor's Bonnett" (Traditional) – 1:23
12. "Cooper's Lament" – 2:47
13. "Ramblin' 'Round" (Woody Guthrie; music based on "Goodnight Irene" by Huddie Ledbetter and John Lomax) – 3:14

== Personnel ==
- Arlo Guthrie – vocals, guitar, banjo, piano, harmonica
- Doug Dillard – banjo
- Clarence White – guitar
- Kevin Burke – fiddle
- Ry Cooder – guitar
- Buddy Collette – clarinet
- Ed Shaughnessy – drums, tabla
- Chuck Rainey – bass guitar
- Stan Free – piano, harpsichord
- Jesse Ed Davis – guitar
- Gene Parsons – drums
- Clydie King – background vocals
- Jim Keltner – drums
- Grady Martin – guitar
- Buddy Alan – guitar
- Bob Arkin – bass guitar
- George Bohanon – horn
- Jerry Brightman – steel guitar
- Donald Christlieb – woodwind
- Gene Coe – horn
- Nick DeCaro – accordion
- Barry Feldman – Executive Producer
- Venetta Fields – background vocals
- Gib Guilbeau – fiddle
- Bob Glaub – bass guitar
- William Green – oboe
- Richie Hayward – drums
- Dick Hyde – trombone
- Thad Maxwell – bass guitar
- Gene Merlino – background vocals
- Bob Morris – guitar
- John Pilla – guitar
- Thurl Ravenscroft – background vocals
- Don Rich – fiddle, guitar
- Jim Shaw – organ, piano
- Doyle Curtsinger – bass guitar, mandolin
- Jessica Smith – vocals
- Robert Tebow – background vocals
- Mike Utley – organ
- Ernie Watts – flute
- Jerry Wiggins – drums
- Dick Hyde – horn
- Jesse Smith – background vocals
- Jim Gordon – piano
- Leland Sklar – bass guitar

Technical

- Judy Maizel - production manager
- Marty Evans - photography
