= Alice's Restaurant (album) =

Studio album by Arlo Guthrie
- Released: October 1967
- Genre: Folk
- Length: 34:36
- Label: Reprise
- Producer: Fred Hellerman

Arlo Guthrie chronology
Alice's Restaurant (1967)	Arlo (1968)

Professional ratings
Review scores
Source	Rating
AllMusic	4/5 stars
Rolling Stone	Positive
The Village Voice	B+

Alice's Restaurant is the debut studio album by Arlo Guthrie released in October 1967 by Reprise Records. It features one of his most famous songs, "Alice's Restaurant Massacree". A steady seller, the album peaked at No. 17 on the Billboard Top LPs chart in March 1968. The album re-entered the chart in October 1969 and reached No. 63 in November of that year. Alice's Restaurant went gold (500,000 units sold) in September 1969 and Platinum (1,000,000 sold) in October 1986.

The cover depicts Guthrie sitting shirtless at a table set for a meal, holding his knife and fork and waiting for Thanksgiving dinner to be served. He wears a black bowler hat and has a napkin spread across his chest.

In 1996, Guthrie recorded the same material live for the album Alice's Restaurant: The Massacree Revisited.

== Track listing ==
All tracks composed by Arlo Guthrie.

Side one

1. "Alice's Restaurant Massacree" – 18:20

Side two

1. "Chilling of the Evening" – 3:01
2. "Ring-Around-a-Rosy Rag" – 2:10
3. "Now and Then" – 2:15
4. "I'm Going Home" – 3:12
5. "The Motorcycle Song" – 2:58
6. "Highway in the Wind" – 2:40

== Personnel ==
- Arlo Guthrie – vocals, guitar
- The unknown musicians who play the electric guitar, keyboards, harmonica, standup bass, tuned percussion and drums
- Al Brown – assistant production
- Richard Chalfin – cover concept
- Diana J. Davies – photography
- Fred Hellerman – production
- Harold Leventhal – liner notes
- Ed Thrasher – art direction
- Sherman Weisburd – cover photography
- John S. Wilson – liner notes
