= Rising Son Records =

American independent record label

Rising Son Records is an independent record label founded in 1983 by Arlo Guthrie. The company has been located in the Old Trinity Church in Housatonic, Massachusetts (a village in the town of Great Barrington) since 1992. The church was home to Alice and Ray Brock, whose Thanksgiving Day dinners were the inspiration for Guthrie's 1967 song "Alice's Restaurant Massacree". Two years later the song was released as a movie by the same name. Rising Son Records offers Guthrie's complete catalogue of music, excepting the original Alice's Restaurant album, which remains under the ownership of Warner Music Group.

== Rising Son catalogue ==
Year	Title	Artist/Notes
2010	Mrs. Hollywood	Xavier
2009	Tales of '69	Arlo Guthrie
2008	32Cents/Postage Due	Arlo Guthrie with The Dillards
2007	Ex Tempore	Johnny Irion
2007	In Times Like These	Arlo Guthrie
2007	This Land is Your Land	Film soundtrack (re-issue)
2005	Folk Uke	Folk Uke
2005	Live in Sydney	Arlo Guthrie
2005	The Last Train	Gordon Titcomb
2004	Entirely Live	Sarah Lee Guthrie & Johnny Irion; EP
2004	Better With You	Terry A La Berry and Friends
2003	Songs from the Southland	Hans Theessink
2003	Spain in My Heart	Various
2002	Banjo Man – A Tribute to Derroll Adams	Various
2001	Sarah Lee Guthrie	Sarah Lee Guthrie & Johnny Irion
2000	Full Circle	Xavier
1998	Lifeline	Hans Theessink
1997	Journey On	Hans Theessink
1991	Woody’s 20 Grow Big Songs	Woody Guthrie
1986	Hard Travelin’	Film soundtrack
1986	Someday	Arlo Guthrie
1982	Power of Love	Arlo Guthrie
1979	Outlasting the Blues	Arlo Guthrie
1978	One Night	Arlo Guthrie
1976	Amigo	Arlo Guthrie
1974	Arlo Guthrie	Arlo Guthrie
1973	Last of the Brooklyn Cowboys	Arlo Guthrie
1972	Hobo’s Lullabye	Arlo Guthrie
1970	Washington County	Arlo Guthrie
1969	Running Down the Road	Arlo Guthrie
1968	Arlo	Arlo Guthrie
