= Arlo Guthrie =

American folk singer (born 1947)

- Guthrie in 1979

Background information
- Born: Arlo Davy Guthrie; July 10, 1947 (age 79); Brooklyn, New York City, U.S.
- Genres: Folk; folk rock; talking blues; protest music
- Occupations: Musician; songwriter
- Instruments: Guitar; piano; vocals; autoharp; banjo; mandolin; harmonica; saxophone
- Works: Arlo Guthrie discography
- Years active: 1965–2020; 2023
- Labels: Warner Bros.; Rising Son; Koch
- Spouses: Jackie Hyde (m. 1969; died 2012); Marti Ladd (m. 2021)
- Website: arlo.net
- Children: 4, including Sarah Lee
- Parents: Woody Guthrie (father); Marjorie Mazia (mother)
- Relatives: Nora Guthrie (younger sister); Aliza Greenblatt (maternal grandmother); Richard Greenblatt (cousin)

Arlo Davy Guthrie (born July 10, 1947) is an American folk singer-songwriter. He is known for singing songs of protest against social injustice, and storytelling while performing songs, following the tradition of his father, Woody Guthrie. Guthrie's best-known work is his debut piece, "Alice's Restaurant Massacree", a satirical talking blues song of about 18 minutes that has since become a Thanksgiving anthem. His only top-40 hit is a cover of Steve Goodman's "City of New Orleans". His song "Massachusetts" was named the official folk song of the state, in which he has lived most of his adult life. Guthrie has also made several acting appearances. He is the father of four children, who have also had careers as musicians.

== Early life and education ==
Guthrie was born in the Coney Island neighborhood of Brooklyn, the son of the folk singer and composer Woody Guthrie and dancer Marjorie Mazia Guthrie. He is the fifth, and oldest surviving, of Woody Guthrie's eight children; two older half-sisters died of Huntington's disease (of which Woody also died in 1967, when Arlo was 20), an older half-brother died in a train accident, another half-sister died in a car crash, and a fourth sister died in childhood. His sister is the record producer Nora Guthrie. His mother was a professional dancer with the Martha Graham Company and founder of what is now the Huntington's Disease Society of America. Arlo's father was from a Baptist family of English and Scottish descent; and his mother was Jewish, the daughter of immigrants from Ukraine. His maternal grandmother was Yiddish poet Aliza Greenblatt, and country/western singer Jack Guthrie, who died when Arlo was an infant, was Arlo's cousin once removed.

Guthrie received religious training for his bar mitzvah from Rabbi Meir Kahane, who formed the Jewish Defense League. "Rabbi Kahane was a really nice, patient teacher," Guthrie later recalled, "but shortly after he started giving me my lessons, he started going haywire. Maybe I was responsible." Guthrie converted to Catholicism in 1977, before embracing interfaith beliefs later in his life. "I firmly believe that different religious traditions can reside in one person, or one nation or even one world," Guthrie said in 2015. In 2020, following his retirement, Guthrie expressed a philosophical affinity for gospel music, noting: "Gospel music to me is the biggest genre of protest music. If this world ain't doing it for you, and your hopes are in the next one – you can't get more protest than that."

Guthrie attended Woodward School in Clinton Hill, Brooklyn, from first through eighth grades. In 1965, he graduated from Stockbridge School in Stockbridge, Massachusetts. He spent the summer of 1965 in London, eventually meeting Karl Dallas, who connected Guthrie with London's folk rock scene and became a lifelong friend of his. He briefly attended Rocky Mountain College, in Billings, Montana. He received an honorary doctorate from Siena College in 1981 and from Westfield State College in 2008.

As a singer, songwriter, and lifelong political activist, Guthrie carries on the legacy of his father. He was awarded the Peace Abbey Courage of Conscience award on September 26, 1992.

== Career ==
=== "Alice's Restaurant" ===
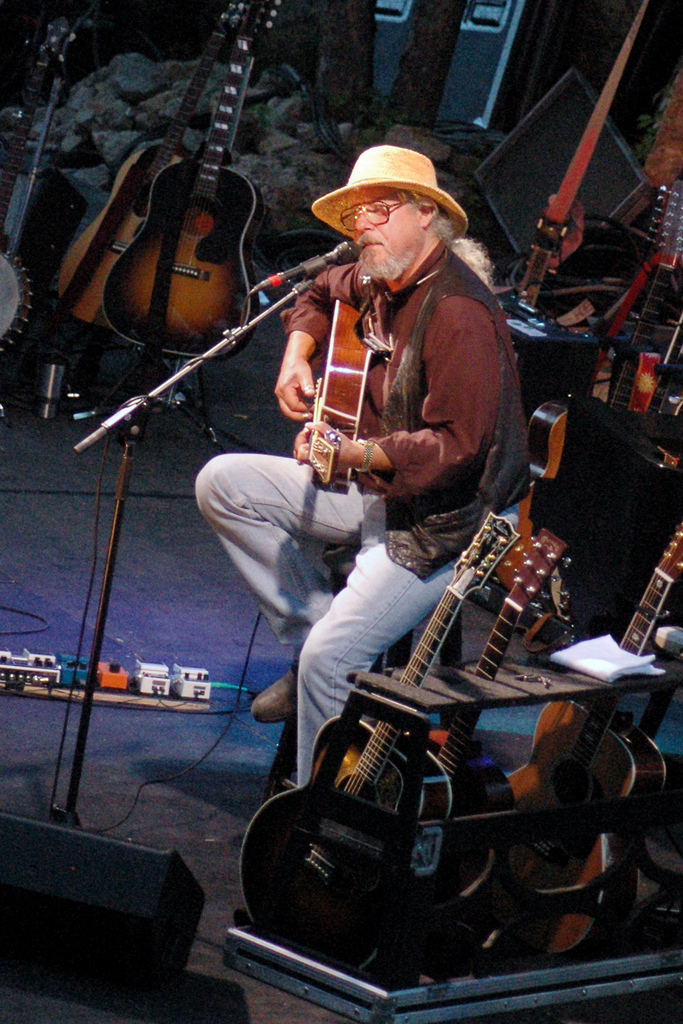
Guthrie performing during the Alice's Restaurant Massacree 40th Anniversary tour in 2005

On November 26, 1965, while in Stockbridge, Massachusetts, during Thanksgiving break from his brief stint in college, 18-year-old Guthrie and his friend, Richard Robbins, were arrested for illegally dumping on private property what Guthrie described as "a half-ton of garbage" from the home of his friends, teachers Ray and Alice Brock, after he discovered that the local landfill was closed for the holiday. Guthrie and Robbins appeared in court, pled guilty to the charges, were levied a nominal fine and picked up the garbage that weekend. Four months later, after dropping out of college and failing at an attempt to claim conscientious objector status, he appeared at the Army Building on Whitehall Street in New York City for a physical examination related to the Vietnam War draft in March 1966.

These incidents served as the basis for Guthrie's most famous work, "Alice's Restaurant", a talking blues song that runs 18 minutes and 34 seconds in its original recorded version. In 1997, Guthrie jokingly pointed out that this was also the exact length of one of the infamous gaps in President Richard Nixon's Watergate tapes, and that Nixon owned a copy of the record. Alice Brock had been a librarian at Arlo's boarding school in the town before opening her restaurant. She later opened an art studio in Provincetown, Massachusetts, which she operated until shortly before her death in 2024.

The song lampoons the Vietnam War draft. However, Guthrie has stated in multiple interviews that the song is more an "anti-stupidity" song than an anti-war song, adding that it is based on a true incident. In the song, Guthrie is called up for a draft examination and rejected as unfit for military service as a result of a criminal record consisting solely of one conviction for the aforementioned littering. Alice and her restaurant are the subjects of the refrain, but are generally mentioned only incidentally in the story (early drafts of the song explained that the restaurant was a place to hide from the police). Though her presence is implied at certain points in the story, Alice herself is described explicitly in the tale only briefly when she bails Guthrie and a friend out of jail. On the DVD commentary for the 1969 movie, Guthrie stated that the events presented in the song all actually happened. Others, such as the arresting officer, William Obanhein, disputed some of the song's details, but generally verified the truth of the overall story.

"Alice's Restaurant" was the song that earned Guthrie his first recording contract, after counterculture radio host Bob Fass began playing a tape recording of one of Guthrie's live performances of the song repeatedly one night in 1967. A performance at the Newport Folk Festival on July 17, 1967, was also very well received. Soon afterward, Guthrie recorded the song in front of a studio audience in New York City and released it as side one of the album, Alice's Restaurant. By the end of the decade, Guthrie had gone from playing coffee houses and small venues to playing massive and prestigious venues such as Carnegie Hall and the Woodstock Festival.

For a short period after its release in October 1967, "Alice's Restaurant" was heavily played on U.S. college and counterculture radio stations. It became a symbol of the late 1960s, and for many it defined an attitude and lifestyle that were lived out across the country in the ensuing years. Its leisurely finger-picking acoustic guitar and rambling lyrics were widely memorized and played by irreverent youth. Many radio stations in the United States have a Thanksgiving Day tradition of playing "Alice's Restaurant".

A 1969 film, directed and co-written by Arthur Penn, was based on the true story told in the song, but with the addition of a large number of fictional scenes. This film, also called Alice's Restaurant, featured Guthrie and several other figures in the song portraying themselves. The part of his father Woody Guthrie, who had died in 1967, was played by actor Joseph Boley; Alice, who made a cameo appearance as an extra, was also recast, with actress Pat Quinn in the title role. Guthrie, Brock and Robbins have all spoken out about their dissatisfaction with the film and the way they were portrayed.

Despite its popularity, the song "Alice's Restaurant Massacree" was not always featured on the setlist of any given Guthrie performance. Since putting it back into his setlist in 1984, he has performed the song every ten years, stating in a 2014 interview that the Vietnam War had ended by the 1970s and that everyone who was attending his concerts had likely already heard the song anyway. So, after a brief period in the late 1960s and early 1970s when he replaced the monologue with a fictional one involving "multicolored rainbow roaches", he decided to do it only on special occasions from that point forward.

==== Musical career and critical reception ====
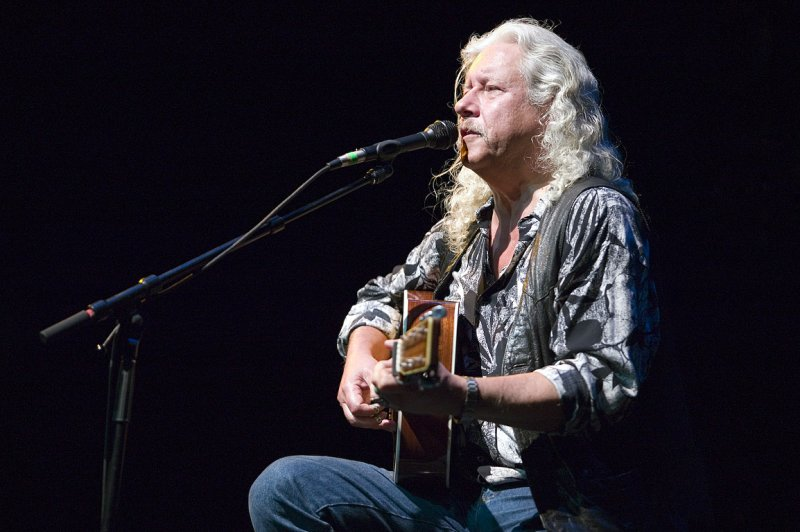
Guthrie performing with the Guthrie Family Legacy Tour 2007

In 1972 Guthrie had a highly successful single as well: Steve Goodman's song "City of New Orleans", a wistful paean to long-distance passenger rail travel. Guthrie's first trip on that train was in December 2005 (when his family joined other musicians on a train trip across the country to raise money for musicians financially devastated by Hurricane Katrina and Hurricane Rita, in the South of the United States). Other songs that achieved minor popularity without reaching the record charts included "Coming into Los Angeles", which was played at the 1969 Woodstock Festival, and a live version of "The Motorcycle Song" (one of the songs on the B-side of the Alice's Restaurant album). A cover of the folk song "Gypsy Davy" was a hit on the easy listening charts.

In the fall of 1975 during a benefit concert in Massachusetts, Guthrie performed with his band, Shenandoah, in public for the first time. They continued to tour and record throughout the 1970s until the early 1990s. Although the band received good reviews, it never gained the popularity that Guthrie did while playing solo. Shenandoah consisted of (after 1976) David Grover, Steve Ide, Carol Ide, Terry A La Berry and Dan Velika and is not to be confused with the country music group Shenandoah. The Ides, along with Terry a la Berry, reunited with Guthrie for a 2018 tour. In 1991, Guthrie's backing band was known as Xavier, an assembly of college-aged musicians led by his son Abe, designed to emulate the sound of Guthrie's studio recordings as closely as possible.

Guthrie performed a concert almost every Thanksgiving weekend at Carnegie Hall from the late 1960s until 2019; he had planned to end the tradition even before his career-ending stroke.

Guthrie's 1976 album Amigo received a five-star (highest rating) from Rolling Stone, and may be his best-received work. Aside from the song Massachusetts, it also includes Victor Jara, a poignant tribute to the slain Chilean folk singer with lyrics by poet Adrian Mitchell.

A number of musicians from a variety of genres have joined Guthrie onstage, including Pete Seeger, David Bromberg, Cyril Neville, Emmylou Harris, Willie Nelson, Judy Collins, John Prine, Wesley Gray, Josh Ritter, and others. A video from a concert with Seeger at Wolf Trap in 1993 has been a staple of YouTube, with Guthrie's story-telling showcased in a performance of "Can't Help Falling in Love". In 2020, Guthrie collaborated with Jim Wilson on a cover of Stephen Foster's "Hard Times Come Again No More".

On October 23, 2020, Guthrie announced via Facebook that he had "reached the difficult decision that touring and stage shows are no longer possible," due to a series of strokes that had impaired his ability to walk and perform. All of his scheduled tour appearances for 2020 were cancelled, and Guthrie said he will not accept any new bookings offered. His final performance at Carnegie Hall was on November 29, 2019. His final live touring concert was on March 7, 2020, at The Caverns in Pelham, Tennessee. He had attempted to record some private concerts in the summer of 2020 but concluded his playing was no longer up to his standards.

Guthrie rescinded his retirement announcement and stated that he would begin touring again in April 2023, albeit with his appearances reduced to locations in the Northeast within driving distance of his Massachusetts home, spaced at least one week apart to allow him to return home between shows. Due to the inhibitions caused by the stroke, the What's Left of Me tour was mostly conversations with Bob Santelli and archival video "with maybe some music included," but he embarked on the comeback tour in an effort to rehabilitate from his stroke more quickly. Guthrie expressed no interest in further tours after What's Left of Me ended, conceding he was no longer interested nor physically able to "live in a tour bus." He remarked in 2025, shortly after making a public appearance at a Guthrie Center fundraiser to celebrate the 60th anniversary of "Alice's Restaurant," that he was amazed that contemporaries who were older than he could still perform and tour, and that he wished that he still had the physical capability to do that.

Following his retirement from full-scale musical touring, Guthrie shifted his public appearances toward spoken-word storytelling and intimate community events. In October 2026, he headlined "Arlo Guthrie – Unscripted," an on-stage conversation and Q&A with journalist Laura Mars at the Mahaiwe Performing Arts Center in Great Barrington, Massachusetts. Serving as a benefit for The Guthrie Center, the event focused on his legacy as an elder folk artist, his family's history, and his life in the Berkshires.

=== Acting ===
Though Guthrie is best known for being a musician, singer, and composer, throughout the years he has also appeared as an actor in films and on television. The film Alice's Restaurant (1969) is his best known role, but he has had small parts in several films and even co-starred in a television drama, Byrds of Paradise.

Guthrie has had minor roles in several movies and television series. Usually, he has appeared as himself, often performing music and/or being interviewed about the 1960s, folk music and various social causes. His television appearances have included a broad range of programs from The Muppet Show (1979) to Politically Incorrect (1998). A rare dramatic film part was in the 1992 movie Roadside Prophets. Guthrie's memorable appearance at the 1969 Woodstock Festival was documented in the Michael Wadleigh film Woodstock.

Guthrie also made a pilot for a TV variety show called The Arlo Guthrie Show in February 1987. The hour-long program included story telling and musical performances and was filmed in Austin, Texas. It was broadcast nationally on PBS. Special guests were Pete Seeger, Bonnie Raitt, David Bromberg and Jerry Jeff Walker.

=== Political activism ===
From the 1960s to the 1980s, Guthrie had taken what seemed a left-leaning approach to American politics, influenced by his father. In his often lengthy comments during concerts, his expressed positions were consistently anti-war, anti-Nixon, pro-drugs and in favor of making nuclear power illegal. However, he apparently did not perceive himself as the major youth culture spokesperson he had been regarded as by the media, as evidenced by the lyrics in his 1979 song "Prologue": "I can remember all of your smiles during the demonstrations ... and together we sang our victory songs though we were worlds apart." A 1969 rewrite of "Alice's Restaurant" pokes fun at former President Lyndon Johnson and his staff.

In 1984, he was the featured celebrity in George McGovern's presidential campaign for the Democratic presidential nomination in Guthrie's home state of Massachusetts, performing at rallies and receptions.

Guthrie identified as a registered Republican in 2008. He endorsed Texas Congressman Ron Paul for the 2008 Republican Party nomination, and said, "I love this guy. Dr. Paul is the only candidate I know of who would have signed the Constitution of the United States had he been there. I'm with him, because he seems to be the only candidate who actually believes it has as much relevance today as it did a couple of hundred years ago. I look forward to the day when we can work out the differences we have with the same revolutionary vision and enthusiasm that is our American legacy." He told The New York Times Magazine that he (had become) a Republican because, "We had enough good Democrats. We needed a few more good Republicans. We needed a loyal opposition."

Commenting on the 2016 election, Guthrie identified himself as an independent, and said he was "equally suspicious of Democrats as I am of Republicans". He declined to endorse a candidate, noting that he personally liked Bernie Sanders despite disagreeing with parts of Sanders' platform. While he thought it "wonderful" that Donald Trump was not relying on campaign donations, he did not believe that it necessarily meant that Trump had the best interests of the country in mind.

In 2018, Guthrie contacted publication Urban Milwaukee to clarify his political stance. He stated "I am not a Republican", and expressed deep disagreement with the Trump administration's views, especially its policies on immigration and treatment of detained immigrants by ICE. Guthrie further clarified, "I left the party years ago and do not identify myself with either party these days. I strongly urge my fellow Americans to stop the current trend of guilt by association, and look beyond the party names and affiliations, and work for candidates whose policies are more closely aligned with their own, whatever they may be. ... I don't pretend to be right all the time, and sometimes I've gone so far as to change my mind from time to time."

Guthrie expressed support for the George Floyd protests in June 2020, stating that it would be good if politicians "embraced it rather than resist the evolving nature of what it means to be an American".

In 2023, Guthrie stated that though he still maintained his personal convictions on particular issues, he had grown to become largely apolitical. He expressed irritation at having his past political views be brought up in later interviews and commented that the collapse of the groups and institutions that his parents' generation had embraced in favor of an overly individualist culture was "disheartening", but a natural progression of society.

=== Legacy ===
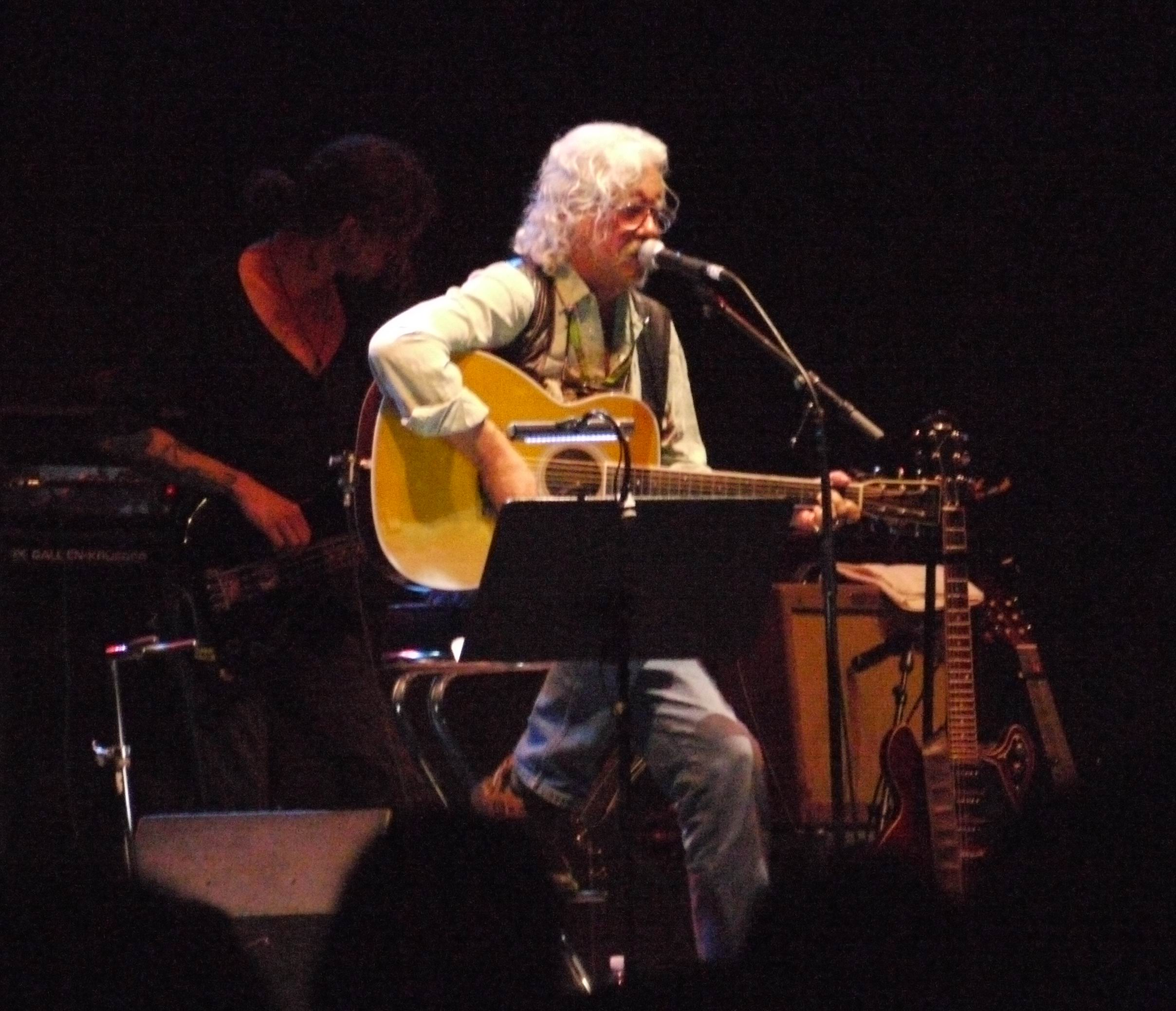
Guthrie in 2010 in Nuremberg, Germany

Like his father, Woody Guthrie, he often sings songs of protest against social injustice. He collaborated with poet Adrian Mitchell to tell the story of Chilean folk singer and activist Víctor Jara in song. He regularly performed with folk musician Pete Seeger, one of his father's longtime partners. Ramblin' Jack Elliott, who had lived for two years in the Guthries' home before Arlo left for boarding school, had absorbed Woody's style perhaps better than anyone; Arlo has been said to have credited Elliott for passing it along to him. Arlo also attributed his inheritance of his father's talking blues stylings as "genetic" without any conscious learning of it, as Woody was too ill to perform by the time Arlo was old enough to enter most concert venues and thus Arlo never saw his father perform live.

In 1991, Guthrie bought the church that had served as Alice and Ray Brock's former home in Great Barrington, Massachusetts, and converted it to the Guthrie Center, an interfaith meeting place that serves people of all religions. The center provides weekly free lunches in the community and support for families living with HIV/AIDS, as well as other life-threatening illnesses. It also hosts a summertime concert series and Guthrie does six or seven fund raising shows there every year. There are several annual events such as the Walk-A-Thon to Cure Huntington's Disease and a "Thanksgiving Dinner That Can't Be Beat" for families, friends, doctors and scientists who live and work with Huntington's disease.

One of the title characters in the comic strip Arlo and Janis is named after Guthrie. Cartoonist Jimmy Johnson noted he was inspired by a friend who resembled Guthrie to name one of his characters Arlo. English commentator Arlo White was named after Guthrie.

Guthrie was the subject of a 2012 unauthorized biography, Arlo Guthrie: The Warner Reprise Years, by Hank Reineke, for which Guthrie refused to cooperate. After finding Reineke's work to be "better than (he) imagined it" and feeling it had suffered from Guthrie's non-participation in it, he agreed to assist Reineke in the sequel, Rising Son: The Life and Music of Arlo Guthrie, which was released in 2023. Guthrie has expressed no interest in writing any memoir or tell-all.

== Personal life ==
Guthrie owns a home in Washington, Massachusetts, where he and his first wife Jackie Hyde, were longtime residents. After 43 years of marriage Jackie died on October 14, 2012, shortly after being diagnosed with liver cancer.

In 2021, Guthrie announced his engagement to Marti Ladd, with whom he had been in a relationship since shortly after Jackie's death. The couple married December 8, 2021. It is the second marriage for each of them. Guthrie had met Ladd 20 years earlier when he went to Woodstock, New York with his wife Jackie to do a film. They stayed at The Wild Rose Inn, where Ladd was the owner/operator. In September 2016, Ladd sold the inn and moved in with Guthrie.

He and Ladd now split time between Washington, Massachusetts in the summer and Micco, Florida in the winter.

Guthrie's son Abe Guthrie and his daughters Annie Guthrie, Sarah Lee Guthrie, and Cathy Guthrie are also musicians. Abe Guthrie was formerly in the folk-rock band Xavier and has toured with his father. Annie Guthrie writes songs, performs, and takes care of family touring details. Sarah Lee performed and recorded with her then-husband Johnny Irion from 2000 until their 2014 breakup. Cathy plays ukulele in Folk Uke, a group she formed with Amy Nelson, a daughter of Willie Nelson. Cathy and Sarah Lee also perform as the "Guthrie Girls", a country music duo.

On October 23, 2020, Guthrie announced he was retiring from touring and stage shows, citing health issues, including a stroke on Thanksgiving Day 2019 which required brief hospitalization and physical therapy. On his official website and in social media, he posted, "A folksinger's shelf life may be a lot longer than a dancer or an athlete, but at some point, unless you're incredibly fortunate or just plain whacko (either one or both) it's time to hang up the 'Gone Fishing' sign. Going from town to town and doing stage shows, remaining on the road is no longer an option." In a November 2023 interview, Guthrie conceded that he was having difficulty adjusting to retirement and not being able to perform the way he had his entire life. In 2025, Guthrie said that his Social Security pension and appearances on Cameo "is what I live on".

== Discography ==
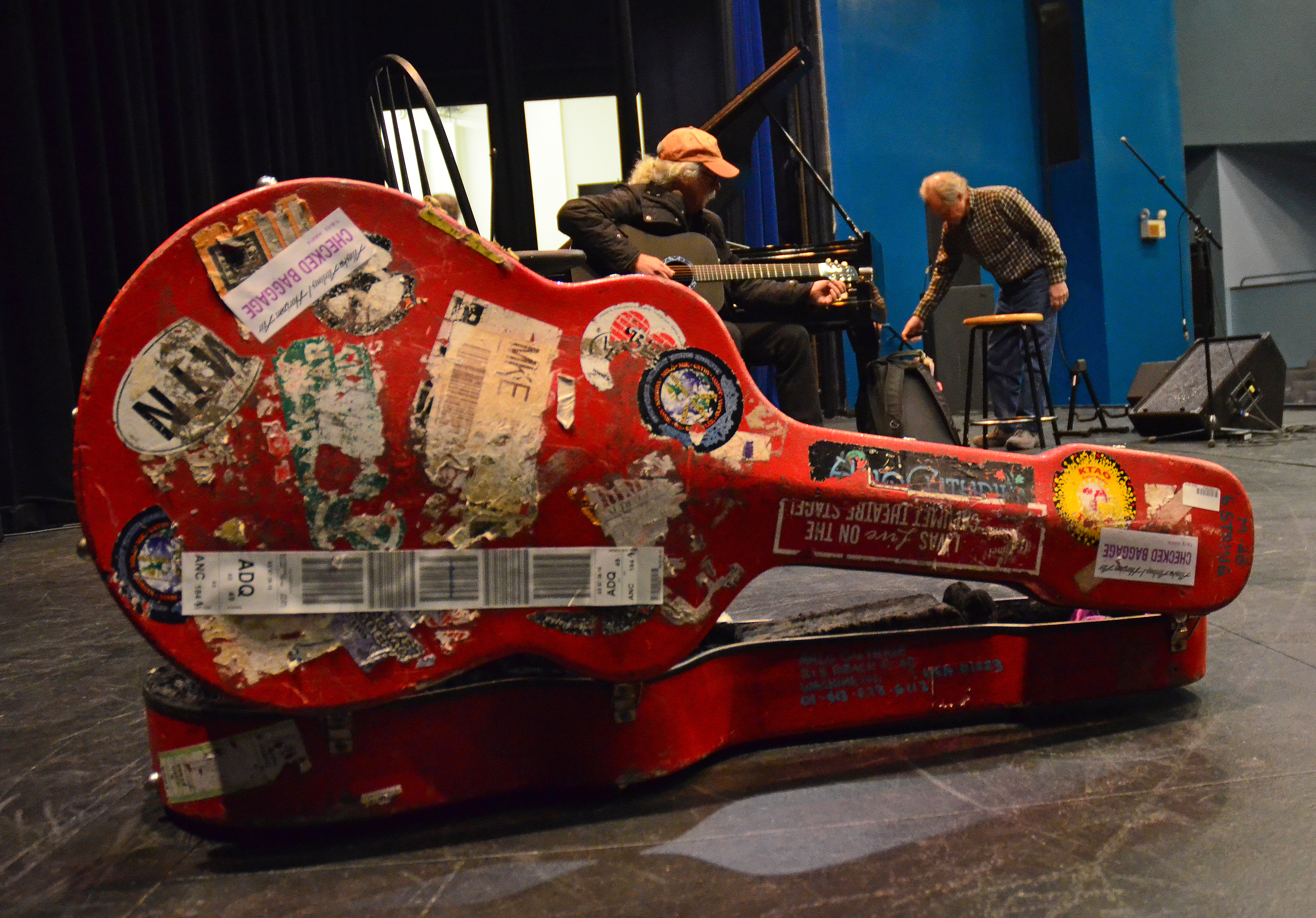
Guthrie tuning up before a performance in Kodiak, Alaska, in 2013

=== Studio albums ===
- Alice's Restaurant (1967)
- Running Down the Road (1969)
- Washington County (1970)
- Hobo's Lullaby (1972)
- Last of the Brooklyn Cowboys (1973)
- Arlo Guthrie (1974)
- Amigo (1976)
- One Night (1978), with Shenandoah
- Outlasting the Blues (1979), with Shenandoah
- Power of Love (1981)
- Someday (1986)
- Baby's Storytime (1990)
- Son of the Wind (1992)
- Woody's 20 Grow Big Songs (1992)
- Mystic Journey (1996)
- This Land Is Your Land: An All American Children's Folk Classic (1997), with Woody Guthrie
- In Times Like These (2007), with University of Kentucky Symphony Orchestra
- 32¢ Postage Due (2008), with The Dillards
- Tales of '69 (2009)

== Other works ==
=== Selected filmography ===
- Alice's Restaurant (1969)
- Renaldo and Clara (1978)
- Baby's Storytime (1989)
- Roadside Prophets (1992)

=== Notable television appearances ===
- Beat Club (season 1, episode 52) February 28, 1970
- The Byrds of Paradise (1994, 8 episodes), a short-lived ABC drama set in Hawaii
- Relativity December 29, 1996
- Renegade, guest-starring in "Top Ten with a Bullet" (season 5, episode 14) aired on January 24, 1997
- Rich Man, Poor Man Book II: two episodes, 1976
- The fourth season of The Muppet Show.
- The Fiftieth Anniversary of "Alice's Restaurant". PBS special on Thanksgiving Day, November 26, 2015

=== Film and television composer ===
- Alice's Restaurant (1969) (song "Alice's Restaurant Massacree")
- Woodstock (1970)
- Clay Pigeon (1971) also known as Trip to Kill (UK)
- Baby's Storytime (1989)

=== Producer and writer ===
- Isn't This a Time! A Tribute Concert for Harold Leventhal (2004)
- Mooses Come Walking (1995) (children's book)

=== Appearances as himself ===
- The Johnny Cash Show (season 2, episode 1), January 21, 1970
- Hylands hörna (episode # 4.4) January 31, 1970
- Woodstock (1969) (also known as Woodstock 25th Anniversary Edition and as Woodstock, 3 Days of Peace & Music)
- The Dick Cavett Show September 8, 1970
- Arthur Penn 1922–: Themes and Variants (1970) (TV)
- The Tonight Show Starring Johnny Carson, August 17, 1972
- The Muppet Show (episode # 4.8) June 19, 1979
- Take it to the limit (1980)
- The Weavers: Wasn't That a Time (1982)
- Woody Guthrie: Hard Travelin' (1984)
- Farm Aid '85 (1985) (TV)
- Farm Aid '87 (1987) (TV)
- A Vision Shared: A Tribute to Woody Guthrie and Leadbelly (1988)
- Woodstock: The Lost Performances (1990)
- Woodstock Diary (1994) (TV)
- The Kennedy Center Honors: A Celebration of the Performing Arts (1994) (TV)
- The History of Rock 'N' Roll, Vol. 6 (1995) (TV) (also known as My Generation)
- This Land Is Your Land: The Animated Kids' Songs of Woody Guthrie (1997)
- Healthy Kids (1998) (TV series)
- The Ballad of Ramblin' Jack (2000)
- Hollywood Rocks the Movies: The Early Years (1955–1970) (2000) (TV)
- Last Party 2000 (2001) (also known as The Party's Over)
- Pops Goes the Fourth! (July 4, 2001)
- NPR's Talk of the Nation radio broadcast (November 14, 2001)
  - "St. James Infirmary" and "City of New Orleans"
- Singing in the Shadow: The Children of Rock Royalty (2003)
- Get Up, Stand Up (2003) (TV series)
- From Wharf Rats to the Lords of the Docks (2004)
- Isn't This a Time! A Tribute Concert for Harold Leventhal (2004)
- Sacco and Vanzetti (2006)
- 1968 with Tom Brokaw (2007)
- Pete Seeger: The Power of Song (2008) (American Masters PBS TV special)
- The 84th Annual Macy's Thanksgiving Day Parade (2010) (TV special)

== See also ==
- Jan Randall
- List of 1970s one-hit wonders in the United States
