= Bear Creek (San Francisquito Creek tributary) =

Bear Creek Arroyo de la Presa Bear Gulch Creek
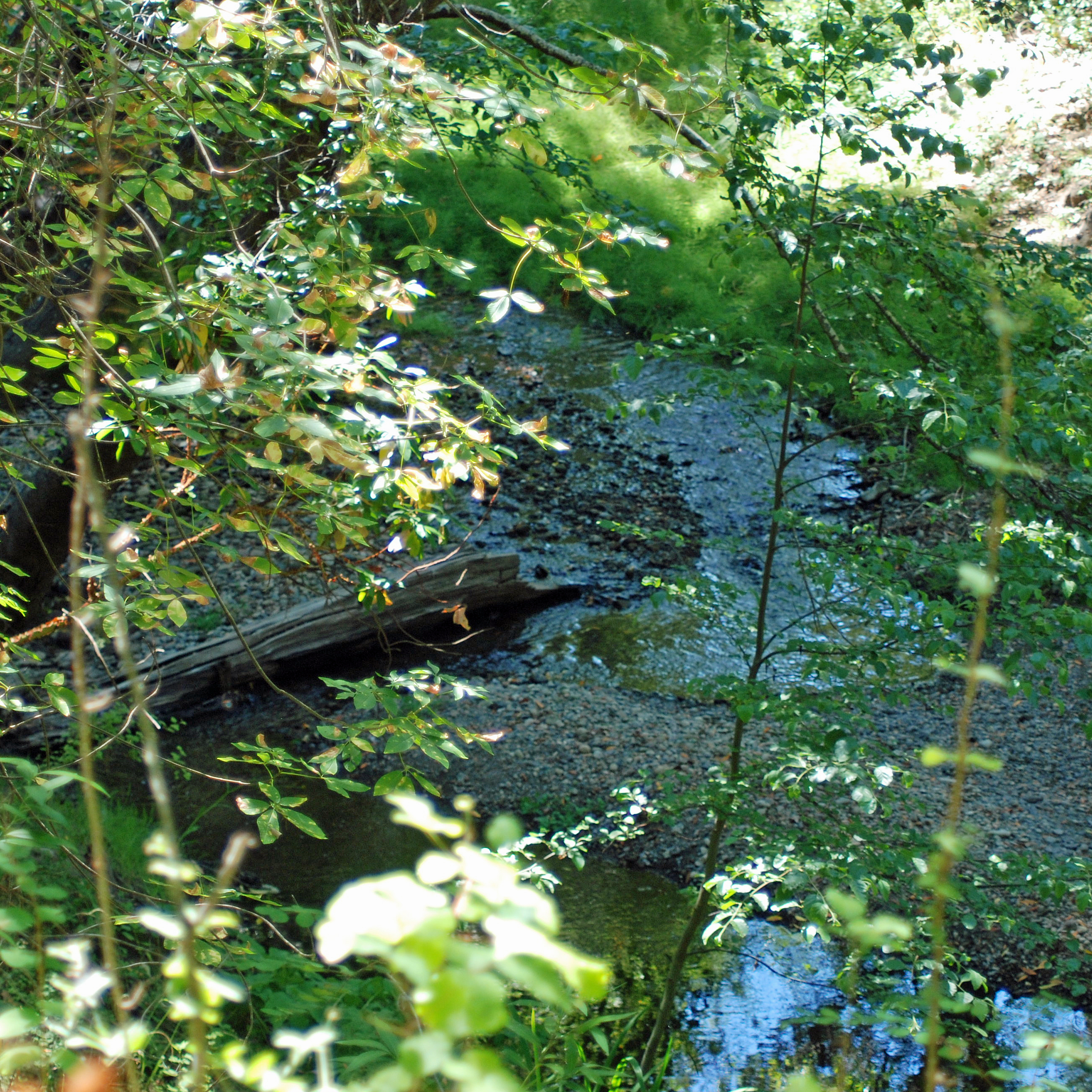
- Bear Creek coming down from top of photo to join with Corte Madera Creek at bottom of photo, forming San Francisquito Creek below Searsville Dam.

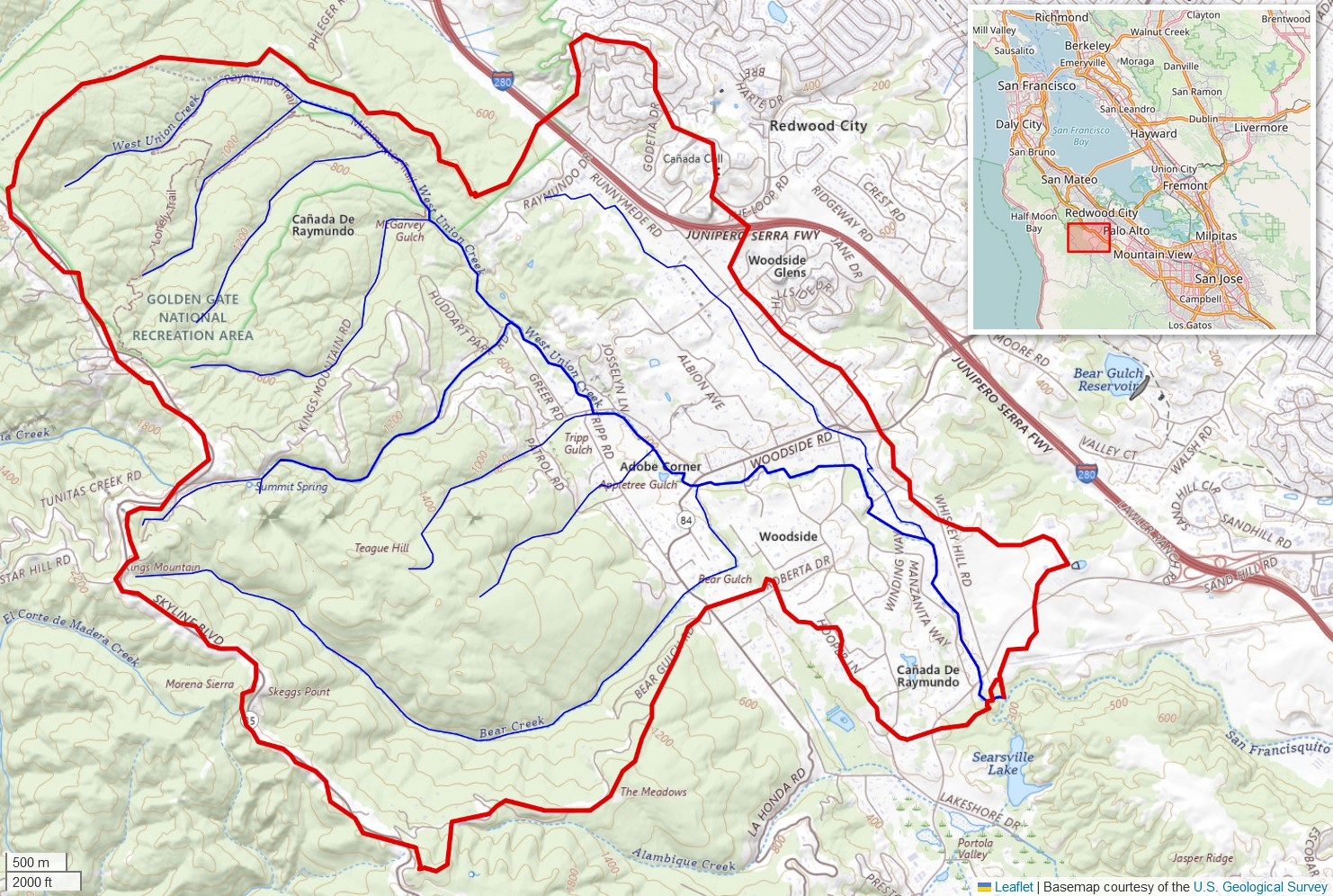
- Bear Creek watershed (Interactive map)

Location
- Country: United States
- State: California
- Region: San Mateo County
- City: Woodside, California

Physical characteristics
- Source: Northeast slope of Sierra Morena, California a summit in the Sierra Morena portion of the Santa Cruz Mountains, near Kings Mountain, California
  - location: Woodside
  - coordinates: 37°25′09″N 122°19′09″W
  - elevation: 2,150 ft (660 m)
- Mouth: San Francisquito Creek
  - location: Jasper Ridge Biological Preserve, Stanford University
  - coordinates: 37°24′36″N 122°14′18″W
  - elevation: 256 ft (78 m)
- Basin size: 31 km^{2} (12 sq mi)

Basin features
- Progression: Bear Creek > San Francisquito Creek > San Francisco Bay > Pacific Ocean
- Tributaries
  - left: West Union Creek, Dry Creek

Bear Creek, or Bear Gulch Creek, is a 6.6-mile-long (10.6 km) southeastward-flowing stream originating north of the summit of Sierra Morena in the Santa Cruz Mountains, near the community of Kings Mountain in San Mateo County, California, United States. It flows through the town of Woodside. Bear Creek and Corte Madera Creek join to become San Francisquito Creek in the Jasper Ridge Biological Preserve at Stanford University.

== History ==
The Spanish called the creek Arroyo de la Presa, meaning "creek of the dam", and it was part of the Rancho Cañada de Raymundo land grant. A foreclosure sale in 1861 records, "Arroyo de la Presa, now called by the Americans Bear Gulch...which heads near the summit of the mountains (Sierra Morena)". In 1850, Mexican war veteran James H. Ryder was working for Dr. Robert Orville Tripp's lumber company, which used oxen to haul the logs to what is now Redwood City, where they were then floated to San Francisco. When two oxen went missing, Ryder went looking for them only to be attacked by a California grizzly bear (Ursus arctos californicus) with two cubs when he stopped for a drink at a creek. Severely mauled, he survived — and the creek became known as Bear Gulch Creek and James Ryder became known as "Grizzly" Ryder.

== Indomitable salmon ==
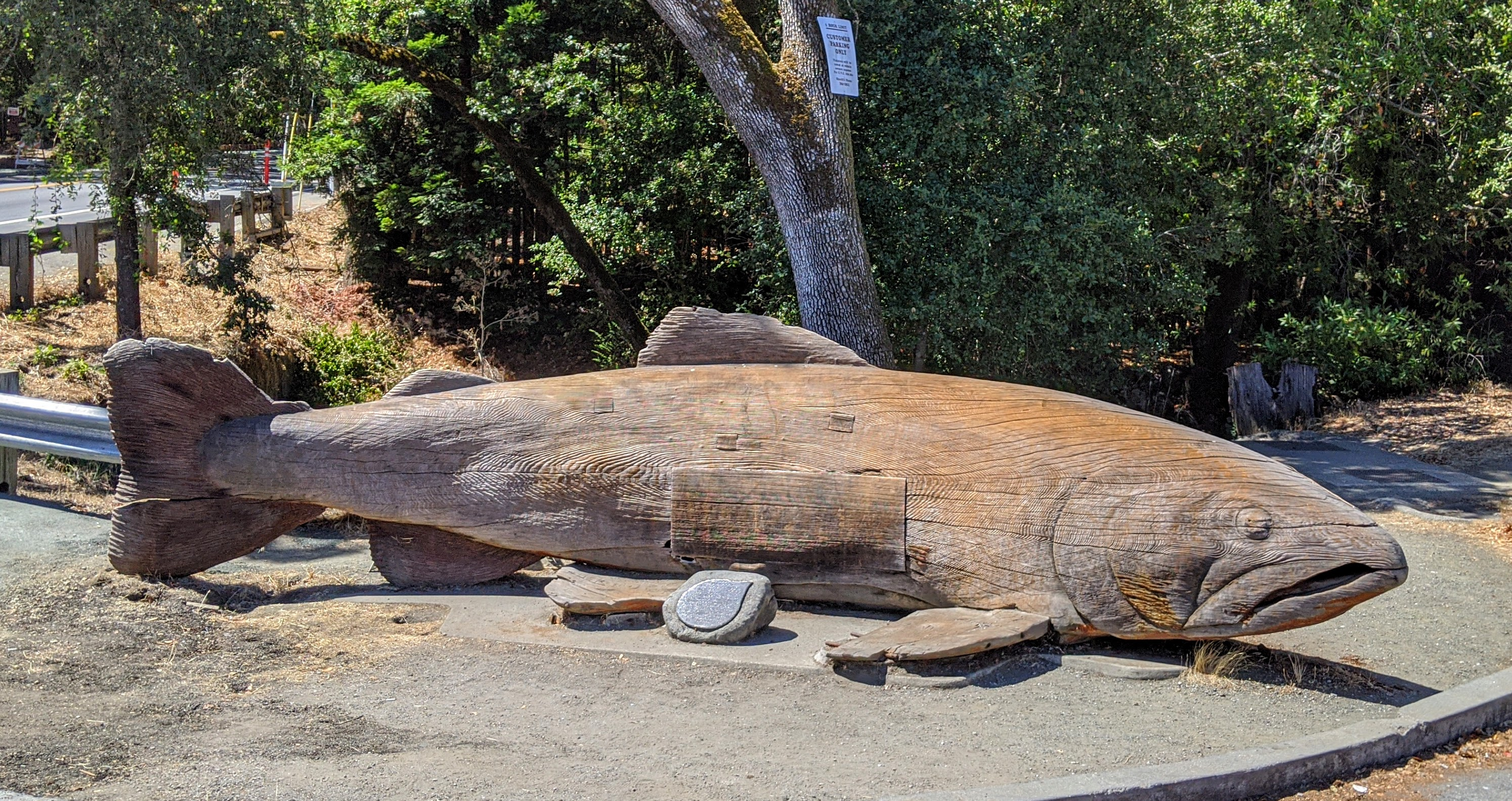
The sculpture of the Indomitable salmon, installed March 5, 1974 at the Prairie Creek Fish Hatchery, currently outside Buck's of Woodside restaurant in Woodside, California.

The large wooden salmon sculpture that sits outside Buck's of Woodside restaurant was carved to commemorate a salmon's remarkable return journey to the Prairie Creek Fish Hatchery where it was born. On 2 December 1964, Superintendent Ken Johnson hatchery near Orick, Humboldt County, California found a 2-year-old marked coho salmon swimming in a tank of newborn fish, exactly where he had been raised two years earlier. To reach the tank, he had to travel from the Pacific Ocean up Redwood Creek, turn into Lost Man Creek, run up a ditch, through a 1.5 feet (0.46 m) culvert under Highway 101, through a storm sewer, and up the hatchery waste water through a 4 inches (10 cm) drainage pipe, making a 90 degree turn and a 2.5 feet (0.76 m) vertical jump inside the pipe. Finally, he rammed through an overhead wire mesh screen, probably by jumping, to get into the rearing pond. The fish was rapidly nicknamed Indomitable by the local press. Looking for how he got into the tank, workers found 72 more marked coho jack salmon of the same age class stuck in the flume or drainage pipe on the way to the hatchling pond. The story of Indomitable received massive press coverage, inspired a book, and continues to be cited as one of the amazing feats of animal migration.

After the Prairie Creek Hatchery closed in 1992, the original Davis salmon sculpture was sold by the Humboldt County Board of Supervisors and is currently installed outside Buck's of Woodside, by a minor tributary of Bear Creek called Dry Creek.

== Watershed ==
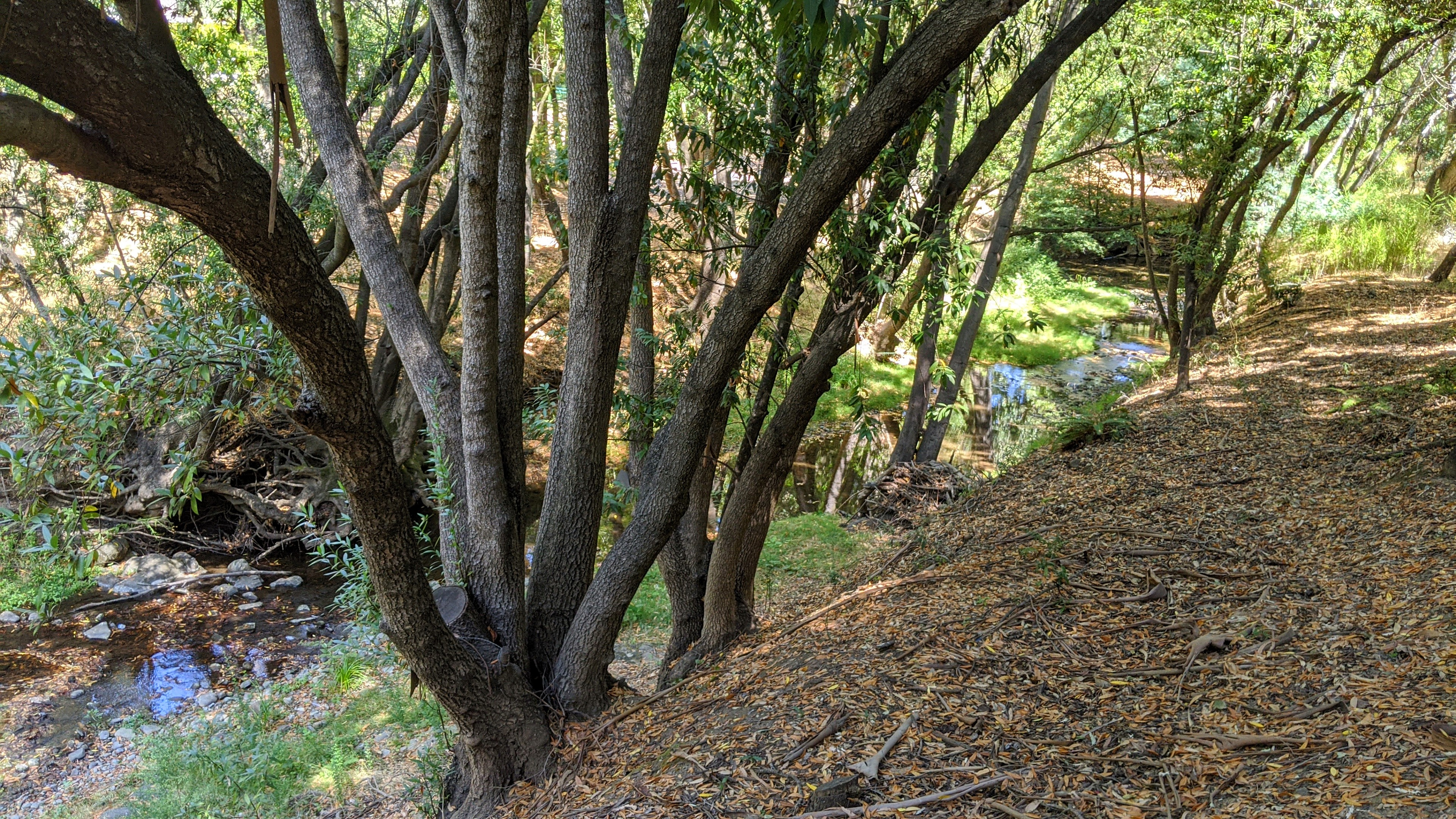
Bear Creek after it crosses below Mountain Home Road

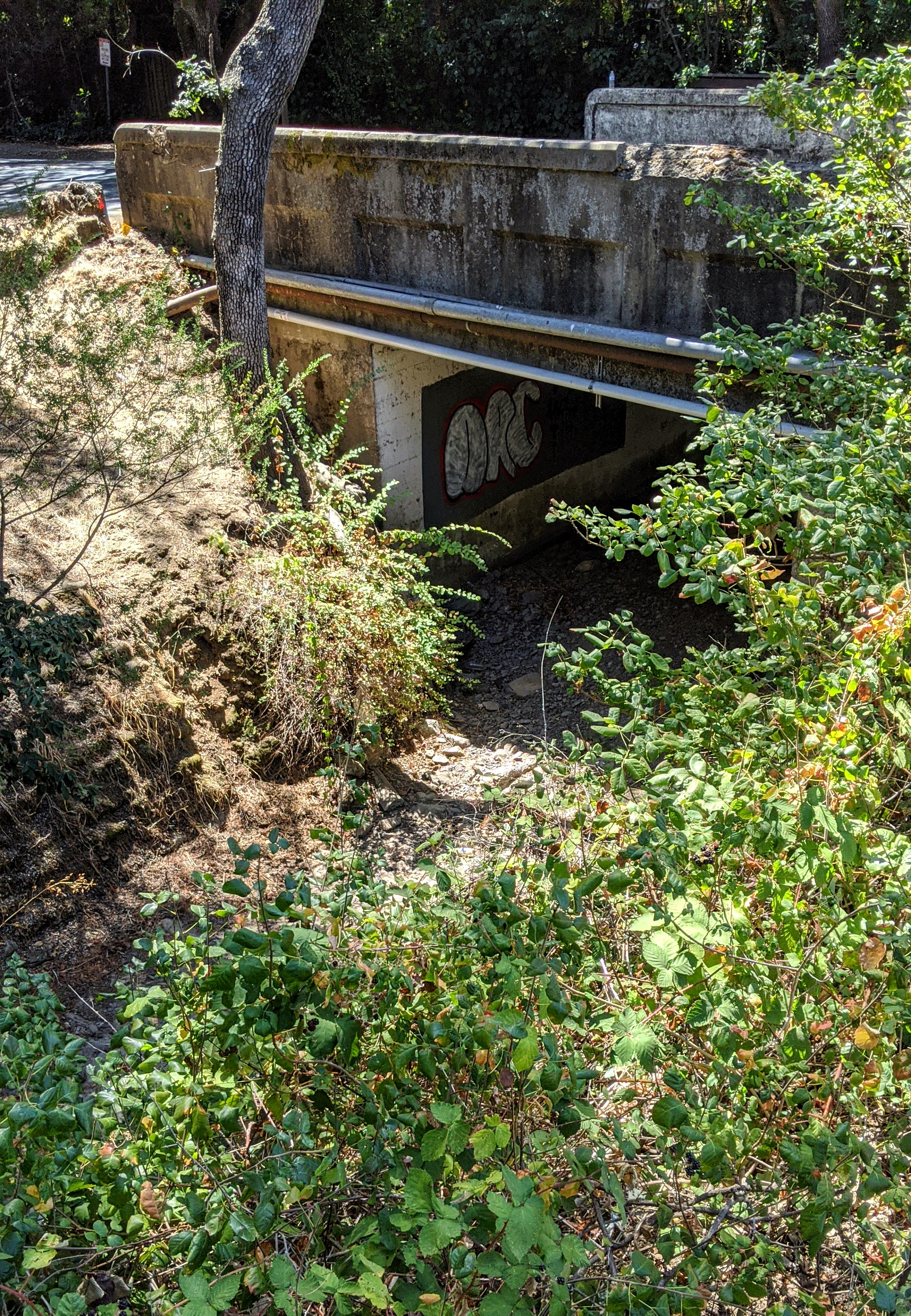
The tributary Dry Creek flows along the west side of Cañada Road and by Buck's of Woodside, before crossing Woodside Road, then under Mountain Home Road (this view) before its confluence with the Bear Creek mainstem.

The Bear Creek mainstem is formed by the confluence of Bear Gulch Creek and West Union Creek near the intersection of Kings Mountain Road and Highway 84 in Woodside, California. The candelabra pattern of the numerous creeks and gulches that culminate in Bear Creek formed due to the motion of the San Andreas Fault. West Union Creek originates in the Phleger Estate, now part of the San Francisco State Fish and Game Refuge. The other Bear Creek tributaries flow through numerous additional public lands including Huddart County Park, Teague Hill Regional Open Space Preserve, and the northern edge of Wunderlich County Park. Dry Creek, totally within Woodside, flows south-east along Cañada road. The Bear Creek watershed drains 13 square miles (34 km^{2}).

Water diverted from the creek at Woodside Diversion Dam and Lower Bear Gulch Creek Diversion Dam is stored in Bear Gulch Reservoir and provides as much about 20% of Woodside's drinking water, rising to 50% in the winter months, with the balance coming from Hetch Hetchy. It also supplies water to residents of Menlo Park, Atherton, and Portola Valley. The Woodside Diversion Dam was built around 1840 as a grist mill and is located within the 1,200-plus acre California Water Service Company watershed, and there is a second diversion taken from the lower portion of Bear Gulch Creek near Manzanita Road in Woodside.The California Water Service purchased the Bear Gulch Water Co. from the University of California in 1936. Precessor water companies include Arroyo de La Presa (1863), Corte Madera Water Co. (1863–1873), Menlo Park Water Company (1873–1889) and Bear Gulch Water Company (1889–1936).

== Ecology ==
In the Bear Creek sub-basin of the San Francisquito Creek watershed, adult steelhead (Oncorhynchus mykiss) migrate from the Bay to the freshwater streams of mainstem Bear creek, and its West Union, Bear Gulch and Dry Creek tributaries to spawn. They are listed as a threatened species under the Endangered Species Act. Steelhead smolt spend the first two years of their lives in freshwater, requiring perennial streams, or at least pools, to survive. The anomalously low gradient of the channel of West Union Creek is also related to the fault and creates high quality steelhead habitat, as do the numerous seeps and springs along the fault. The permanent pools created by these seeps and springs are crucial to the survival of steelhead young.

In a 2001 report thirty four barriers to trout migration were identified within Bear Creek and its West Union Creek, Bear Gulch, Squealer Gulch, and McGarvey Gulch tributaries. That report identified the culvert for McGarvey Gulch creek at the Richards Road crossing in Huddart County Park as a significant migration barrier for adult and juvenile steelhead and was reconstructed with funds from the State Department of Transportation's San Francisco Bay Salmonid Habitat Restoration Fund.

== See also ==
- List of watercourses in the San Francisco Bay Area
