= West Union Creek =

Location
- Country: United States
- State: California
- Region: San Mateo County
- City: Woodside, California

Physical characteristics
- Source: Kings Mountain a summit in the Santa Cruz Mountains
  - location: Woodside
  - coordinates: 37°26′48″N 122°19′29″W
  - elevation: 1,600 ft (490 m)
- Mouth: Bear Gulch Creek
  - location: Adobe Corner, Woodside, California
  - coordinates: 37°25′30″N 122°16′01″W
  - elevation: 390 ft (120 m)

Basin features
- Tributaries
  - right: McGarvey Gulch, Squealer Gulch, Tripp Gulch, Appletree Gulch

West Union Creek is a 4.5-mile-long (7.2 km) stream originating on the eastern slope of Kings Mountain in the Santa Cruz Mountains, in San Mateo County, California, United States. It flows easterly down to the valley formed by the San Andreas Rift where it turns near the Phleger Estate to flow southeasterly on an unusually level course (for a mountain stream) to Adobe Corner in the town of Woodside where it then joins Bear Gulch Creek. This in turn flows to the San Francisquito Creek and ultimately, the San Francisco Bay.

== History ==
In August 1840, the Governor of Spanish California granted the land, later called Rancho Cañada de Raymundo, to John Coppinger, an Irishman who had become a naturalized Mexican citizen. This 12,545-acre (5,077 ha) ranch contained the 973 acres (394 ha) which are now Huddart County Park. The area redwoods were an important source of lumber exports. According to Mexican government records of 1841, 100,000 board feet of wood were ready at the embarcadero near Mission Santa Clara for export to the Hawaiian Islands, presumably the source of this timber was Coppinger's Rancho. Willard Whipple was one of many area lumbermen who dragged logs to the port at Redwood City. His Whipple's Mill Road has come to be known as Whipple Avenue. He was a Union sympathizer in the American Civil War and named the creek on which his mills operated West Union Creek. Whipple built his steam-powered Upper Mill in late 1852 at the site of today's Phleger House (now occupied by Intel founder, Gordon E. Moore) on the Phleger Estate.

== Watershed ==
The watershed drains about 7 square miles (18 km^{2}). Numerous steep gulches drain the eastern slope of the Santa Cruz Mountains to nourish West Union Creek. Named tributaries include McGarvey Gulch, Squealer Gulch, Tripp Gulch, and Appletree Gulch. McGarvey Gulch joins West Union Creek at Huddart County Park. Although West Union Creek runs dry most summers, it has perennial pools that provide refugia for steelhead trout, the anadromous form of rainbow trout.

== Ecology ==
Steelhead trout (Oncorhynchus mykiss) migrate from the Bay to spawn in Bear Creek and its West Union and Bear Gulch Creeks tributaries. They are listed as a threatened species under the Endangered Species Act. Steelhead smolt spend the first two years of their lives in freshwater, requiring perennial streams, or at least pools, to survive. The anomalously low gradient of the channel of West Union Creek is related to its course along the San Andreas Fault and creates high quality steelhead habitat, as do the numerous seeps and springs along the fault. The permanent pools created by these seeps and springs are crucial to the survival of steelhead young.

In a 2001 report thirty four barriers to trout migration were identified within Bear Creek and its West Union Creek, Bear Gulch, Squealer Gulch, and McGarvey Gulch tributaries. That report identified the culvert for McGarvey Gulch creek at the Richards Road crossing in Huddart County Park as a significant migration barrier for adult and juvenile steelhead and was reconstructed with funds from the State Department of Transportation's San Francisco Bay Salmonid Habitat Restoration Fund.

== Recreation ==
Hiking trails along West Union Creek include the Miramontes Trail which originates in Huddart County Park. It can also be accessed by the Crystal Springs Trail from Edgewood County Park.

== See also ==
- List of watercourses in the San Francisco Bay Area
