= Sky Londa, California =

Unincorporated community in California, United States

Sky Londa
- Unincorporated community
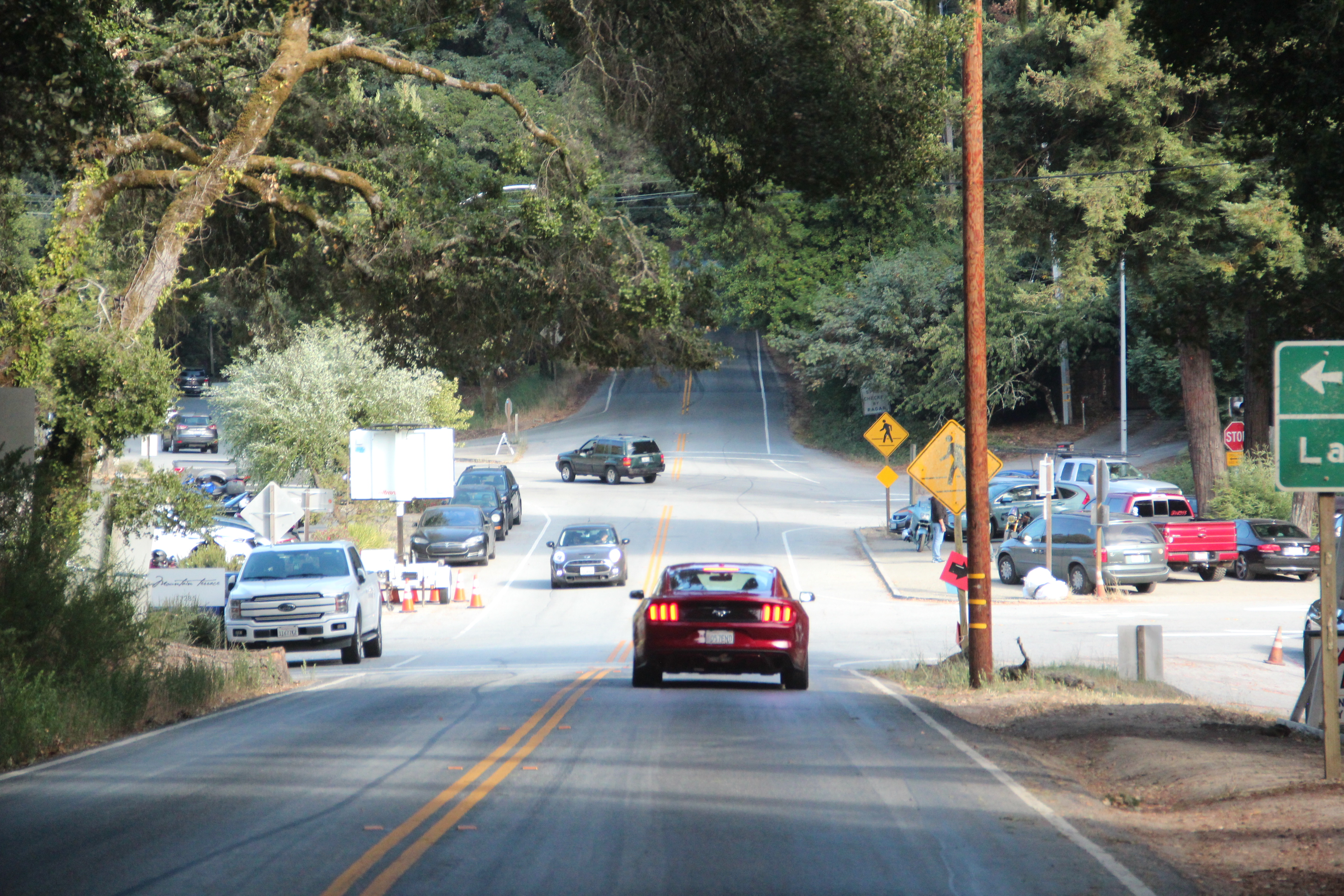
- California State Route 35 in Sky Londa, 2019

- Location within the state of California Sky Londa (the United States)
- Coordinates: 37°23′1″N 122°15′42″W
- Country: United States
- State: California
- County: San Mateo
- Elevation: 1,520 ft (460 m)
- Time zone: UTC-8 (Pacific (PST))
  - Summer (DST): UTC-7 (PDT)
- ZIP codes: 94062
- Area code: 650

Sky Londa is an unincorporated mountain community in San Mateo County, California, United States, located at the intersection of State Route 84 (La Honda Road) and State Route 35 (Skyline Boulevard). The community is inside area code 650 and ZIP code 94062.

Atop the coastal range west of Woodside, the community's official elevation is 1,520 feet (463 m) above mean sea level (AMSL).

While Sky Londa is the spelling approved by the U.S. Board of Geographic Names, a frequently used state government variant spelling is Skylonda. The variant spelling is used on a Caltrans sign for southbound SR35 north of SR84 and on the name of a CDF Fire station in the community. This variant name is also shown as a variant in the National Geographic Names Database. The 1994 USGS 7.5-minute quadrangle, Woodside, California shows it spelled Sky Londa. Maps recorded as early as 1909 show it as Sky L'onda apparently derived from the crossroad names Skyline Boulevard and Woodside-La Honda Road.

The 7.5-minute quadrangle, Woodside, California, (1994), shows Woodside VOR north of the settlement. The aircraft navigation facility is shown as being outfitted with distance measuring equipment. It lies one mile (1.6 km) at 285 degrees off true north from the intersection of SR35 and SR84. Its identifier is "OSI" and publicly available FAA documents show the VOR signal is on 113.9 MHz.

Many of the area's characteristic redwood-log homes were first built in the early 1930s by a developer who subdivided a few tracts and established a water supply and reservoirs dedicated to the new community. The redwood "logs" came from unused railroad-tie stock sawn by a mill located at the intersection until the Depression. The local water is still pumped from wells and La Honda Creek, and delivered to 154 homes by the Sky L'onda Mutual Water Company.

There are a few commercial establishments at the intersection of SR35 and SR84, including two service stations, a convenience store, a real estate office, a small events center, and Alice's Restaurant. Once a general store, and the first commercial building in Sky Londa, during the 1960s the restaurant was bought by one Alice Taylor, who renamed the restaurant after herself. The relationship to the restaurant of Arlo Guthrie's Vietnam War protest song is only in hindsight. Already a renowned stop for motorcyclists, hikers and tourists, Alice’s Restaurant (and the adjacent buildings) was bought in the 1970s and has been family owned and operated ever since.

The area is a popular destination for motorcycle and bicycle riders, especially during spring and summer weekends.

== See also ==
- La Honda, California
- Portola Valley, California
- Skeggs Point, California
