= La Honda, California =

La Honda
- Census-designated place
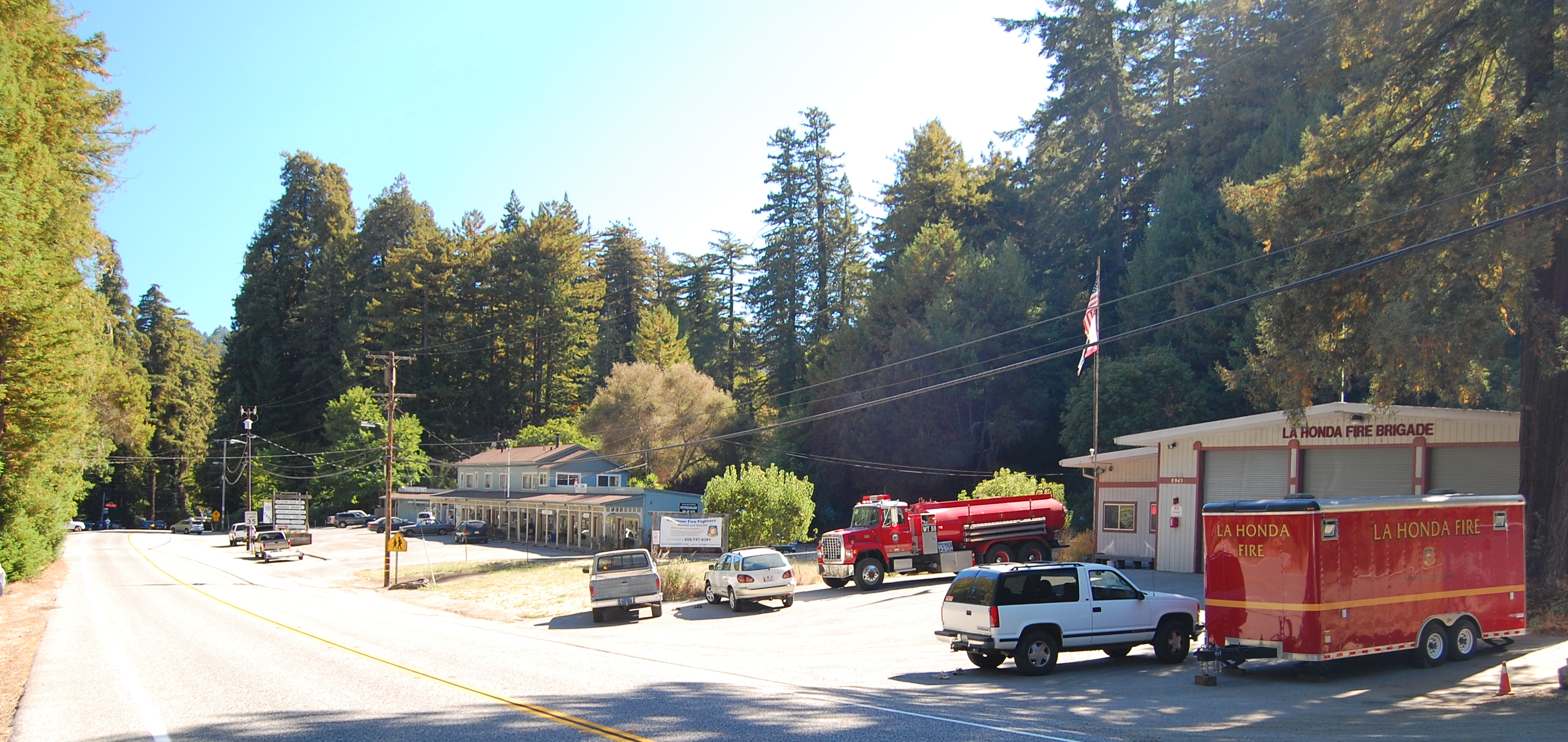
- State Route 84 in downtown La Honda

- Location of La Honda in San Mateo County, California.

- Location within the state of California La Honda (the United States)
- Coordinates: 37°19′9″N 122°16′27″W
- Country: United States
- State: California
- County: San Mateo

Area
  - Total: 4.264 sq mi (11.044 km^{2})
  - Land: 4.256 sq mi (11.023 km^{2})
  - Water: 0.0081 sq mi (0.021 km^{2}) 0.19%
- Elevation: 715 ft (218 m)

Population (2020)
  - Total: 979
  - Density: 230/sq mi (88.8/km^{2})
- Time zone: UTC-8 (Pacific (PST))
  - Summer (DST): UTC-7 (PDT)
- ZIP codes: 94020
- Area code: 650
- FIPS code: 06-39318
- GNIS feature ID: 2628746

La Honda (Spanish for "The Sling") is a census-designated place (CDP) in southern San Mateo County, California, United States. The population was 979 at the 2020 census. It is located in the Santa Cruz Mountains between the Santa Clara Valley and California's Pacific coast. La Honda is near the La Honda Creek Open Space Preserve and State Route 84 on the ocean side of the Coastal Range.

The ZIP Code for La Honda is 94020 and the area code is 650. Land-line numbers in the La Honda telephone exchange follow the pattern 747-xxxx while wired telephones in and around the Middleton Tract (along Portola State Park Road) work out of the Los Altos exchange with 94x-xxxx numbers. Per the U.S. Geological Survey, Lahonda is a historic variant of the modern spelling.

== Geography ==
According to the United States Census Bureau, the CDP covers an area of 4.3 square miles (11.0 km^{2}), 99.81% of it land, and 0.19% of it water.

=== Habitat ===
La Honda is home to diverse habitats, from cool, moist forests of coast redwood and coast Douglas fir, to mixed woodland, chaparral, and grassy hillsides.

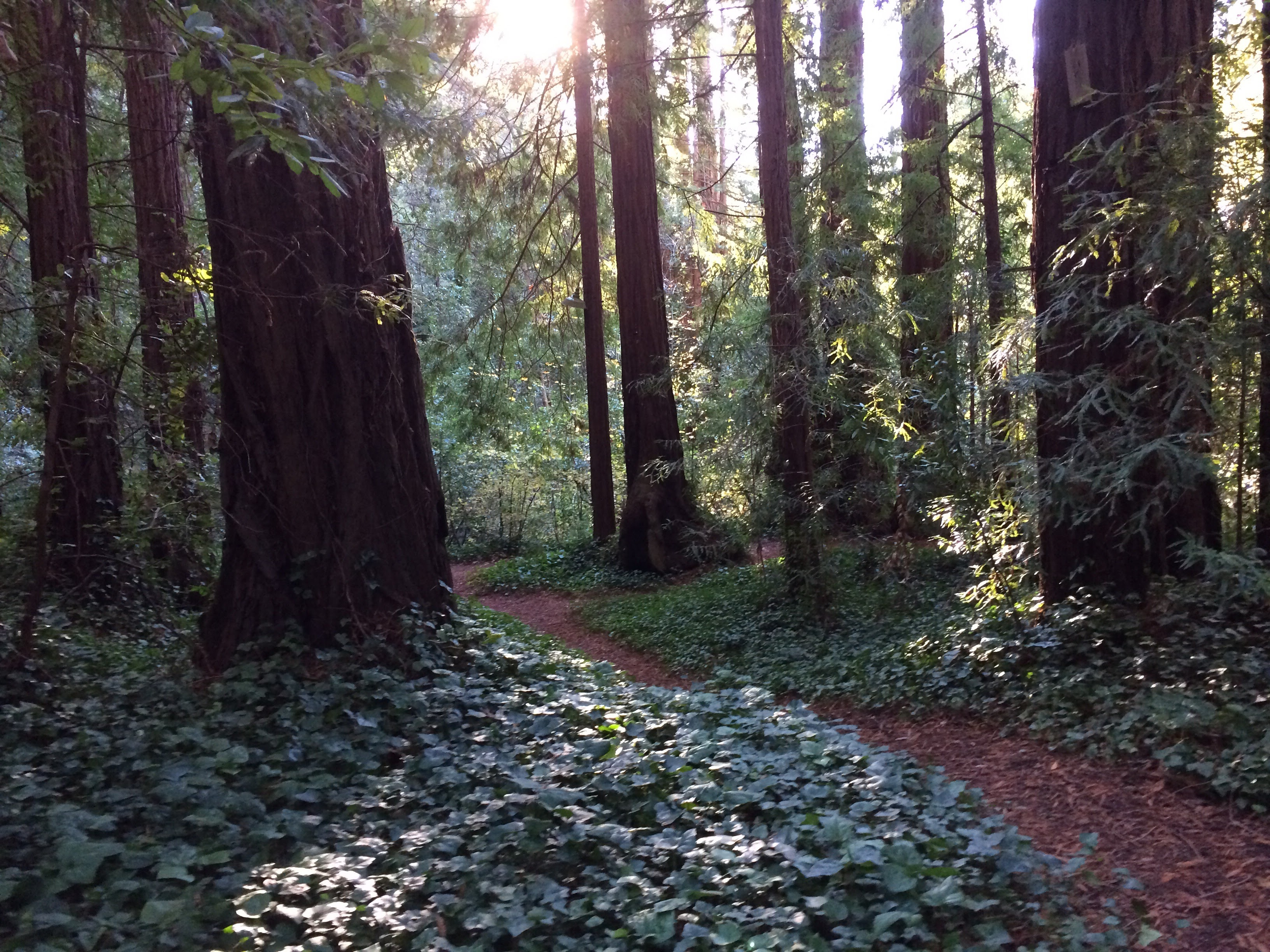
A redwood forest at Play Bowl, a valley traversed by trails and the La Honda Creek, located at the end of Play Bowl Drive..

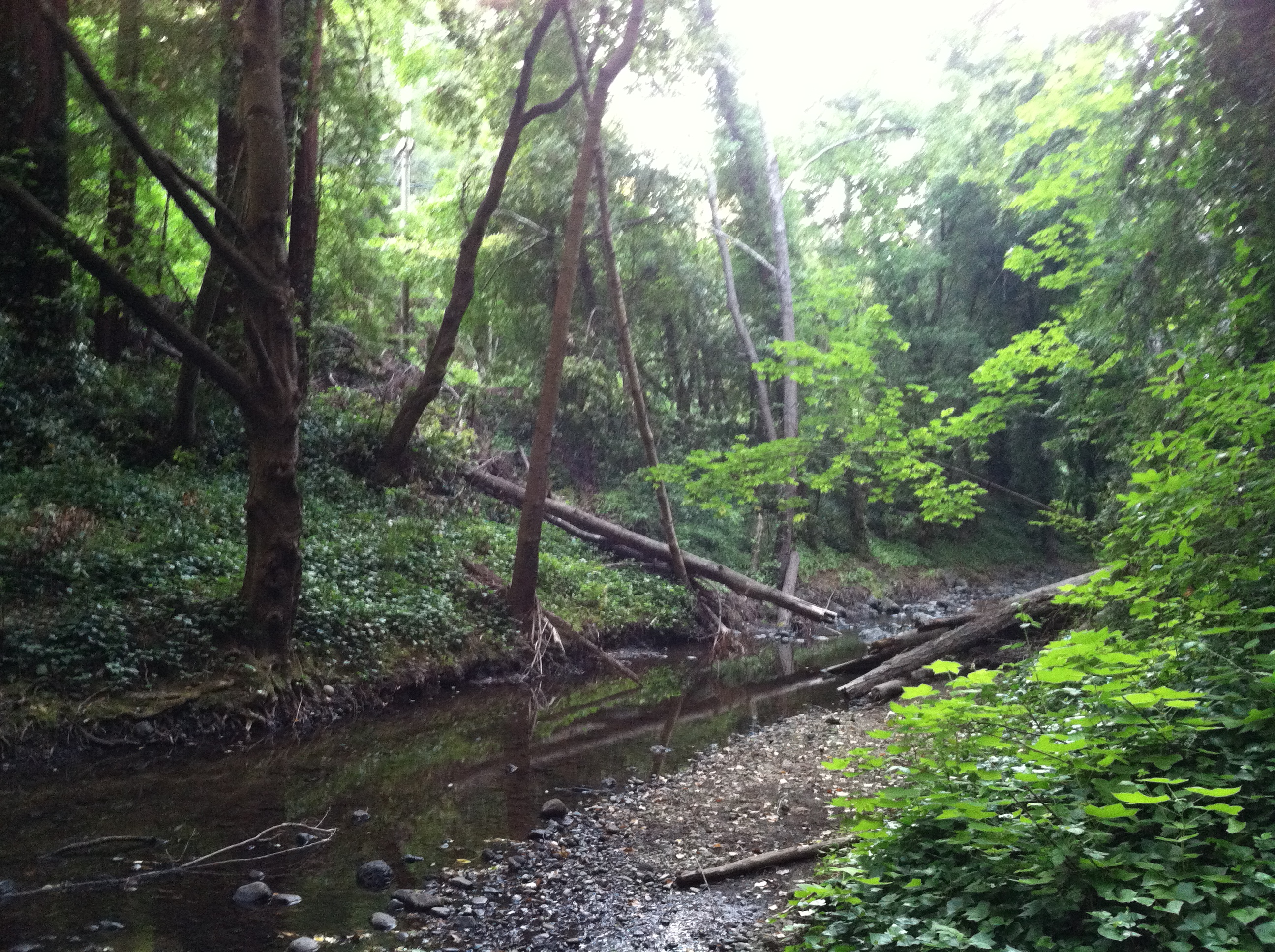
La Honda Creek at Play Bowl.

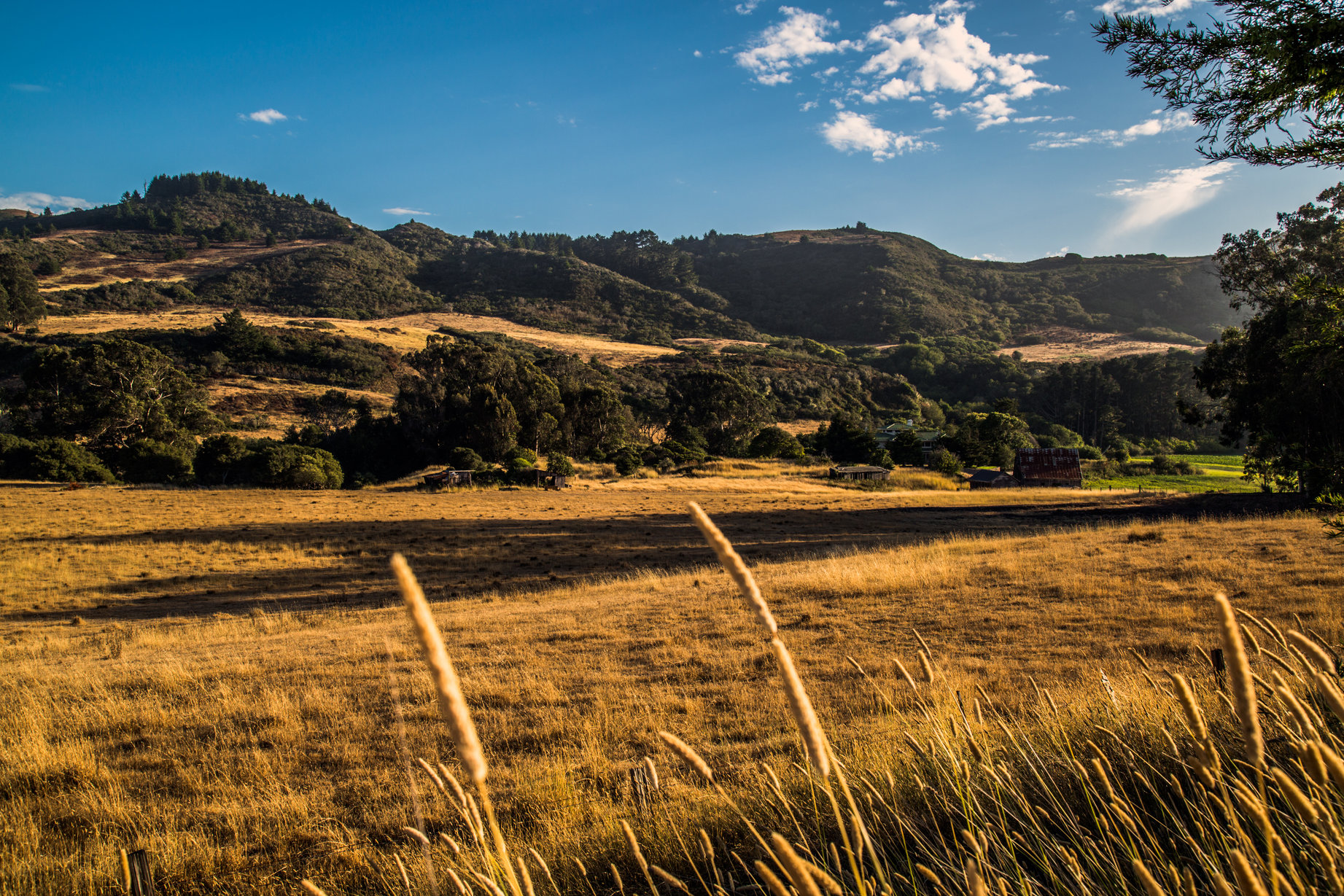
A grassy area between La Honda and San Gregorio (closer to the latter), as seen from Highway 84.

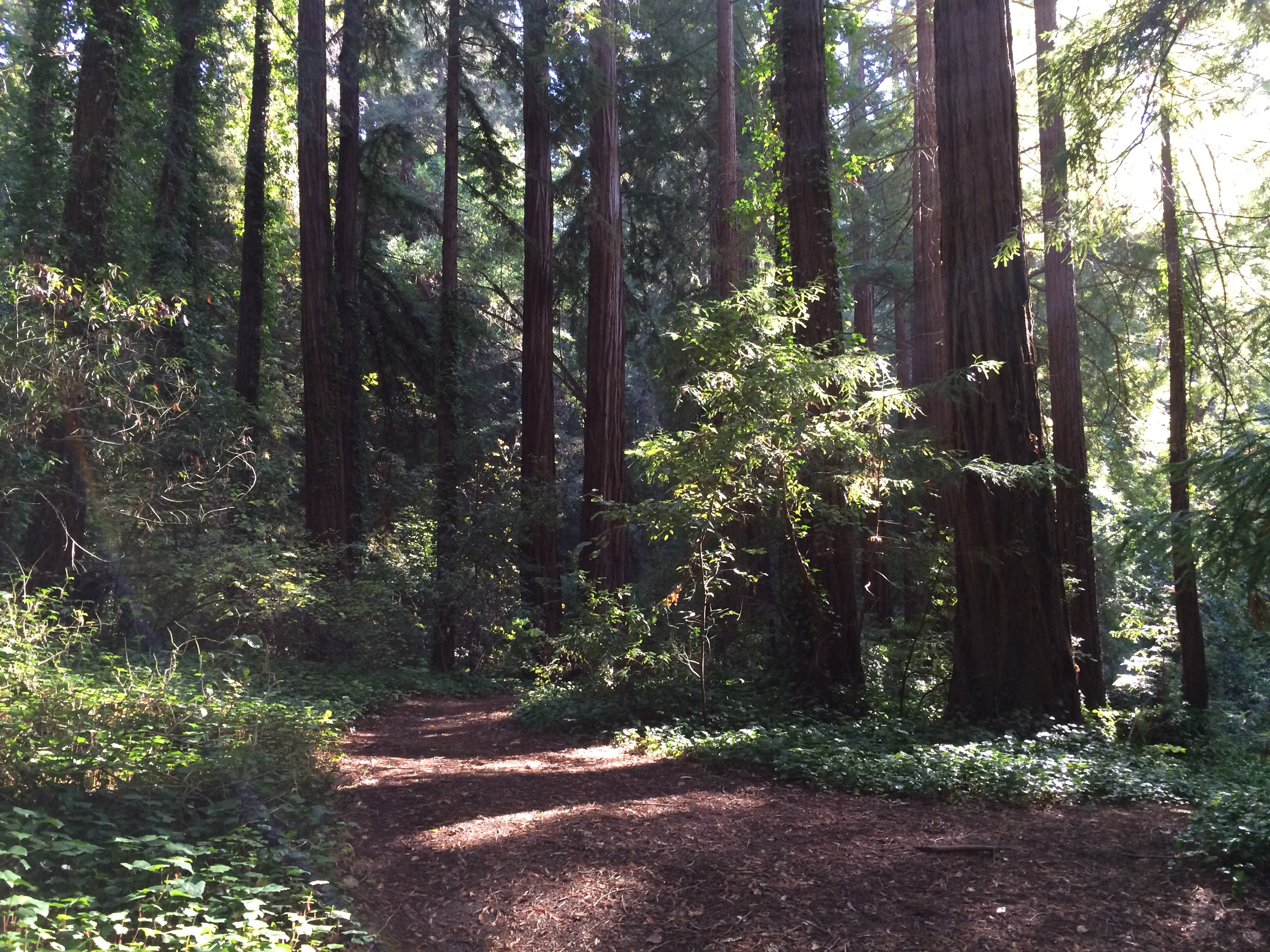
A trail at Play Bowl in November 2015.

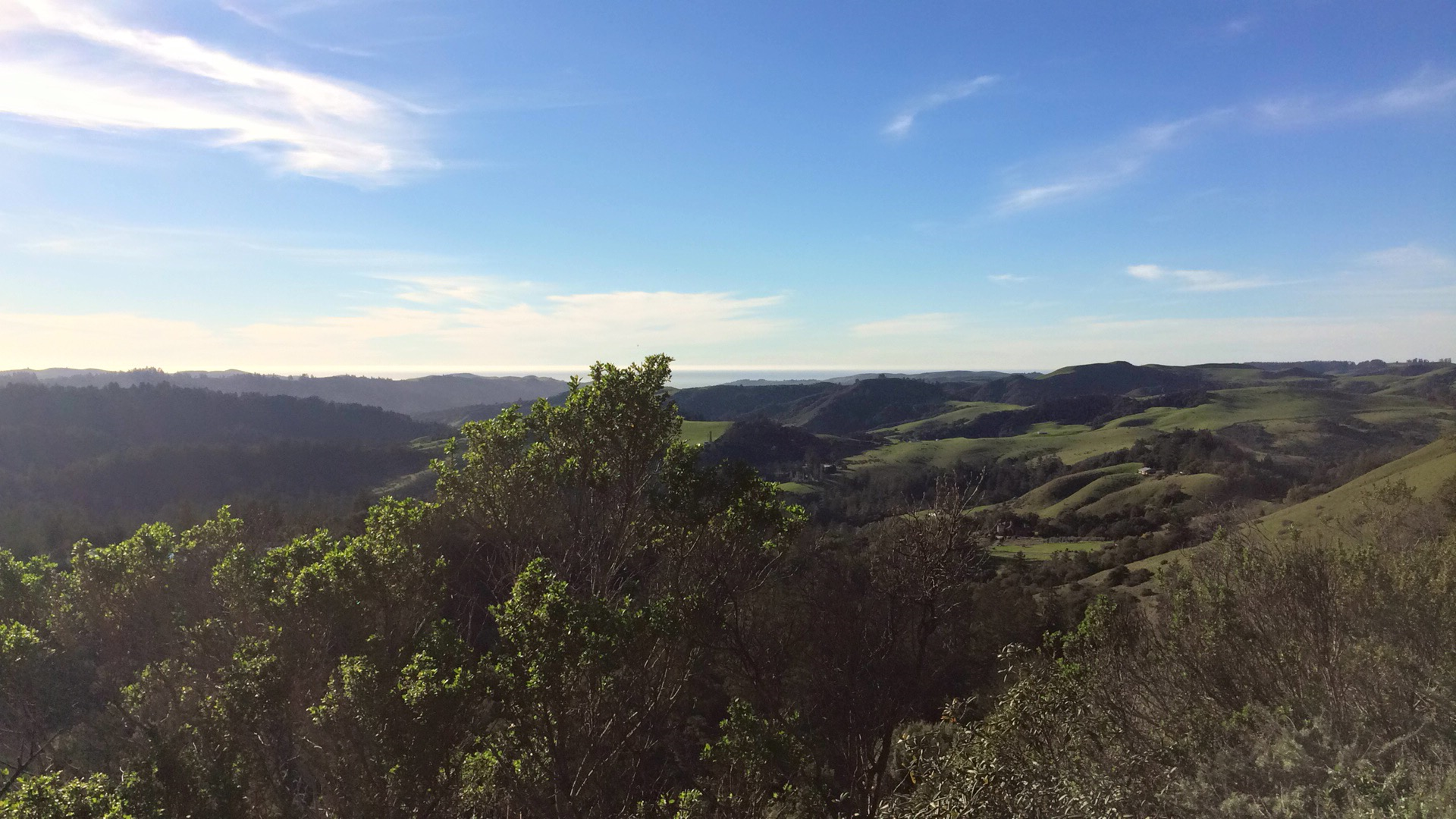
Hills—grassy, wooded, or chaparral-coated—lay between La Honda and the Pacific. From here, only a few buildings on the Northern end of town are visible.

=== Climate ===
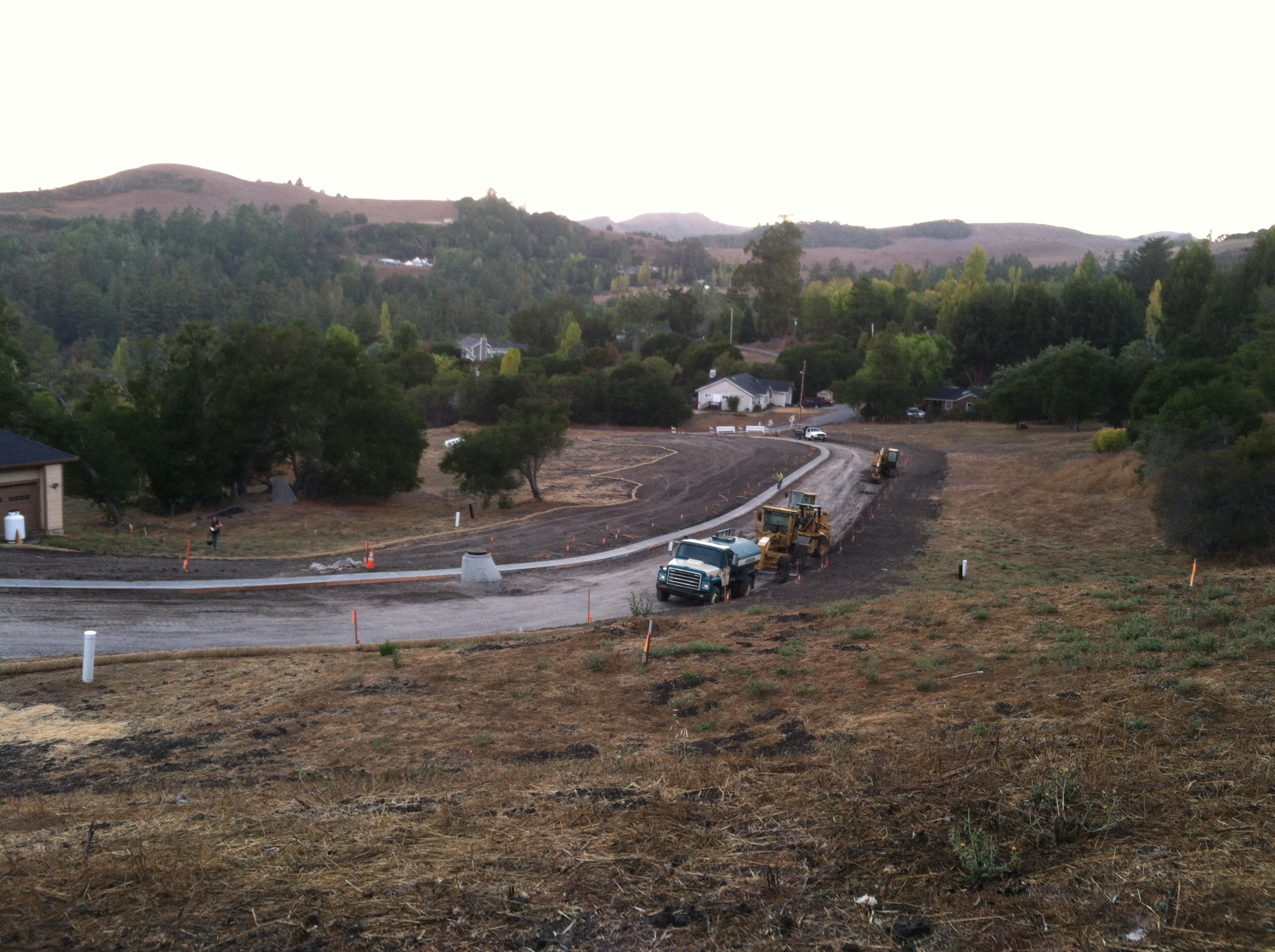
2013 reconstruction of Scenic Drive after 2005's landslide.

This region experiences warm (but not hot) and dry summers, with no average monthly temperatures above 71.6 °F (22.0 °C). According to the Köppen Climate Classification system, La Honda has a warm-summer Mediterranean climate, abbreviated "Csb" on climate maps. In addition, like much of California, the town receives most of its rain between November and April. Due to El Niño, the region sometimes receives heavy winter rains, making it vulnerable to landslides. Scenic Drive, a local road, has seen three landslides since 1998. With elevations ranging from about 300 feet where La Honda Creek meets Alpine Creek, to more than 1200 feet in the hills, the weather may vary between the town's hillsides and valleys. Sometimes the marine layer is too low to reach the hills, leaving the lower elevations foggy or overcast while the mountains enjoy clearer weather. On some winter nights, similar thermal inversions trap cold air in the valleys, leading to frost, with higher elevations remaining generally milder. These same weather patterns are at play in much of the coast-facing Santa Cruz Mountains.

== Demographics ==
Historical population
Census	Pop.	Note	%±
2010	928		—
2020	979		5.5%
U.S. Decennial Census; 1850–1870 1880-1890; 1900 1910 1920; 1930 1940 1950; 1960 1970 1980; 1990 2000 2010

La Honda first appeared as a census designated place in the 2010 U.S. census.

The 2020 United States census reported that La Honda had a population of 979. The population density was 230.0 inhabitants per square mile (88.8/km^{2}). The racial makeup of La Honda was 789 (80.6%) White, 3 (0.3%) African American, 3 (0.3%) Native American, 28 (2.9%) Asian, 2 (0.2%) Pacific Islander, 46 (4.7%) from other races, and 108 (11.0%) from two or more races. Hispanic or Latino of any race were 148 persons (15.1%).

There were 420 households, out of which 97 (23.1%) had children under the age of 18 living in them, 213 (50.7%) were married-couple households, 38 (9.0%) were cohabiting couple households, 73 (17.4%) had a female householder with no partner present, and 96 (22.9%) had a male householder with no partner present. 104 households (24.8%) were one person, and 55 (13.1%) were one person aged 65 or older. The average household size was 2.33. There were 265 families (63.1% of all households).

The age distribution was 142 people (14.5%) under the age of 18, 34 people (3.5%) aged 18 to 24, 259 people (26.5%) aged 25 to 44, 317 people (32.4%) aged 45 to 64, and 227 people (23.2%) who were 65 years of age or older. The median age was 48.9 years. For every 100 females, there were 120.0 males.

There were 457 housing units at an average density of 107.4 units per square mile (41.5 units/km^{2}), of which 420 (91.9%) were occupied. Of these, 256 (61.0%) were owner-occupied, and 164 (39.0%) were occupied by renters.

== Early history ==
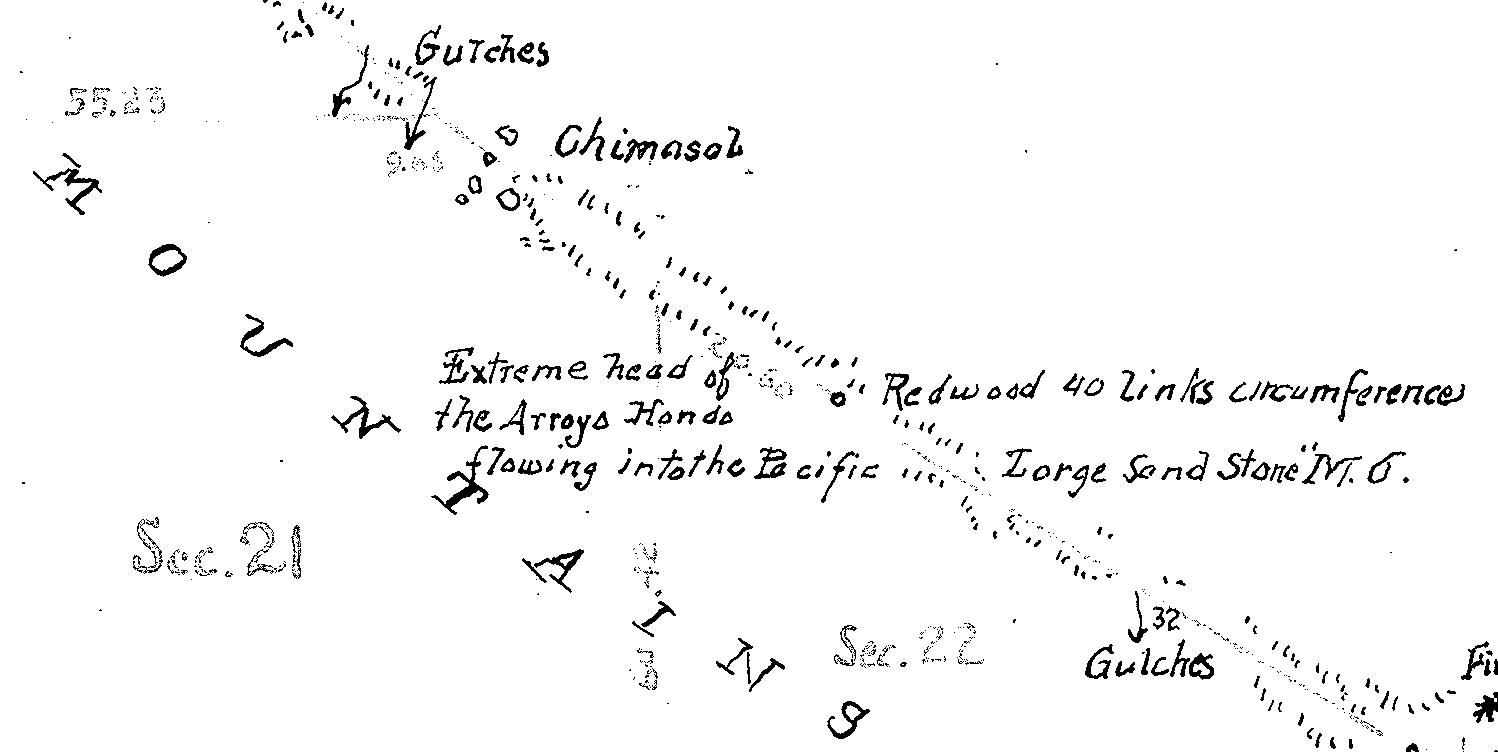
Portion of Rancho Cañada de Raymundo map showing La Honda Creek headwaters in 1856

The Ohlone lived in San Mateo County for at least 3,000 years prior to European arrival and had more than 40 communities in the region. The La Honda Ohlone were hunter gatherers and lived without farming or herd animals.

The creek that runs through the town is listed as Arroyo Ondo on several diseños on the Mexican land grants and as Arroyo Hondo on the 1856 Rancho Cañada de Raymundo map. Hondo is Spanish for 'deep'. The post office was listed as La Honda in 1880 and revised to Lahonda after 1895. The name was restored in 1905 owing to Z. S. Eldredge's efforts.

In 1862 John Howell Sears purchased 400 acres and settled in La Honda after his prior residence in Searsville was sold to the water company due to the decline of lumber and flooding issues. The early days of La Honda were built around the lumber industry and the Old Store at La Honda was one of the earliest buildings.

== Recent history ==
Ken Kesey, the author of One Flew Over the Cuckoo's Nest (pages of which were written all over the restroom wall of his La Honda residence) and other books, owned a home in La Honda, which served as the base of operations for The Merry Pranksters where they used LSD and other drugs. The escapades of Kesey and the Merry Pranksters are documented in Tom Wolfe's The Electric Kool-Aid Acid Test, which describes the wildly painted school bus, 'Furthur', driven by Neal Cassady, who had been the hyperkinetic driver in Jack Kerouac's On the Road.

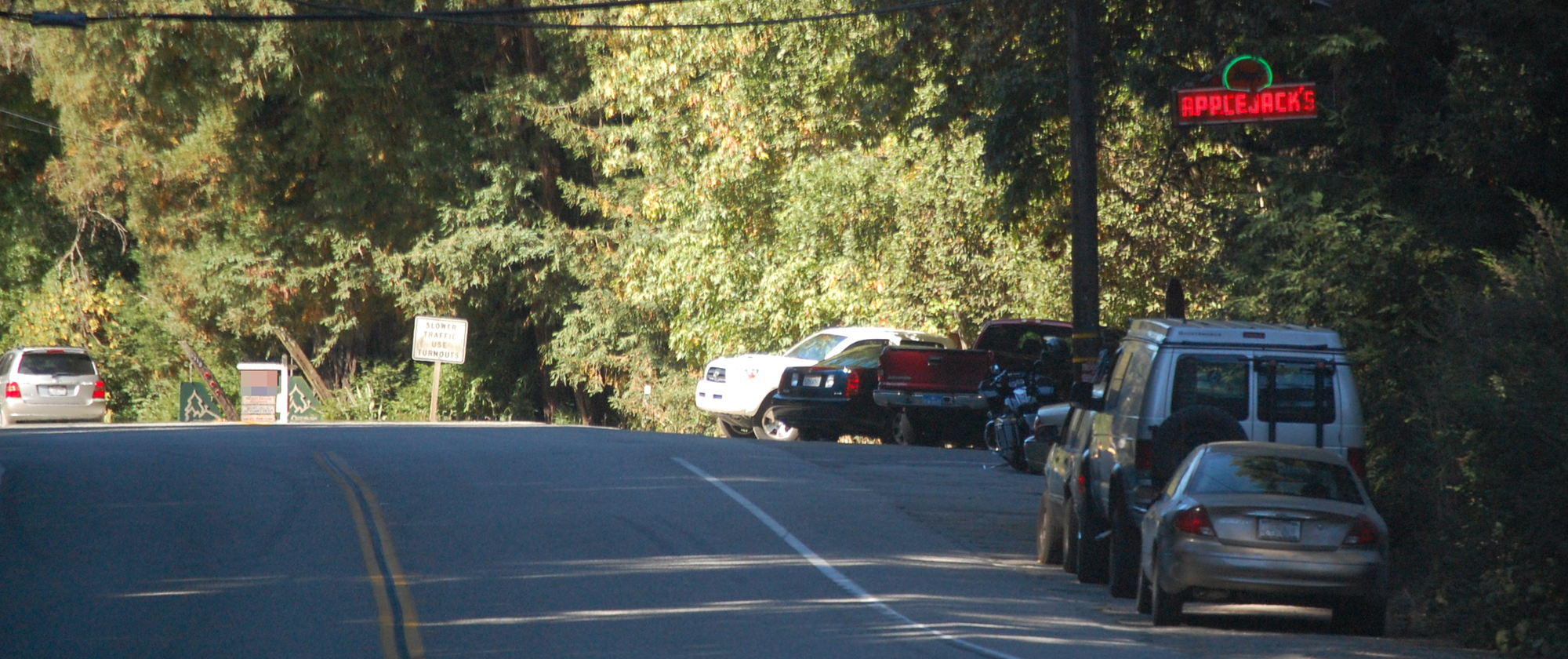
A neon sign in the Redwoods: Applejack's Saloon.

The La Honda house where Kesey's adventures became famous—one mile (1.6 km) west of Apple Jack's Inn—has been faithfully restored after years of neglect and a near-catastrophic flood in 1998.

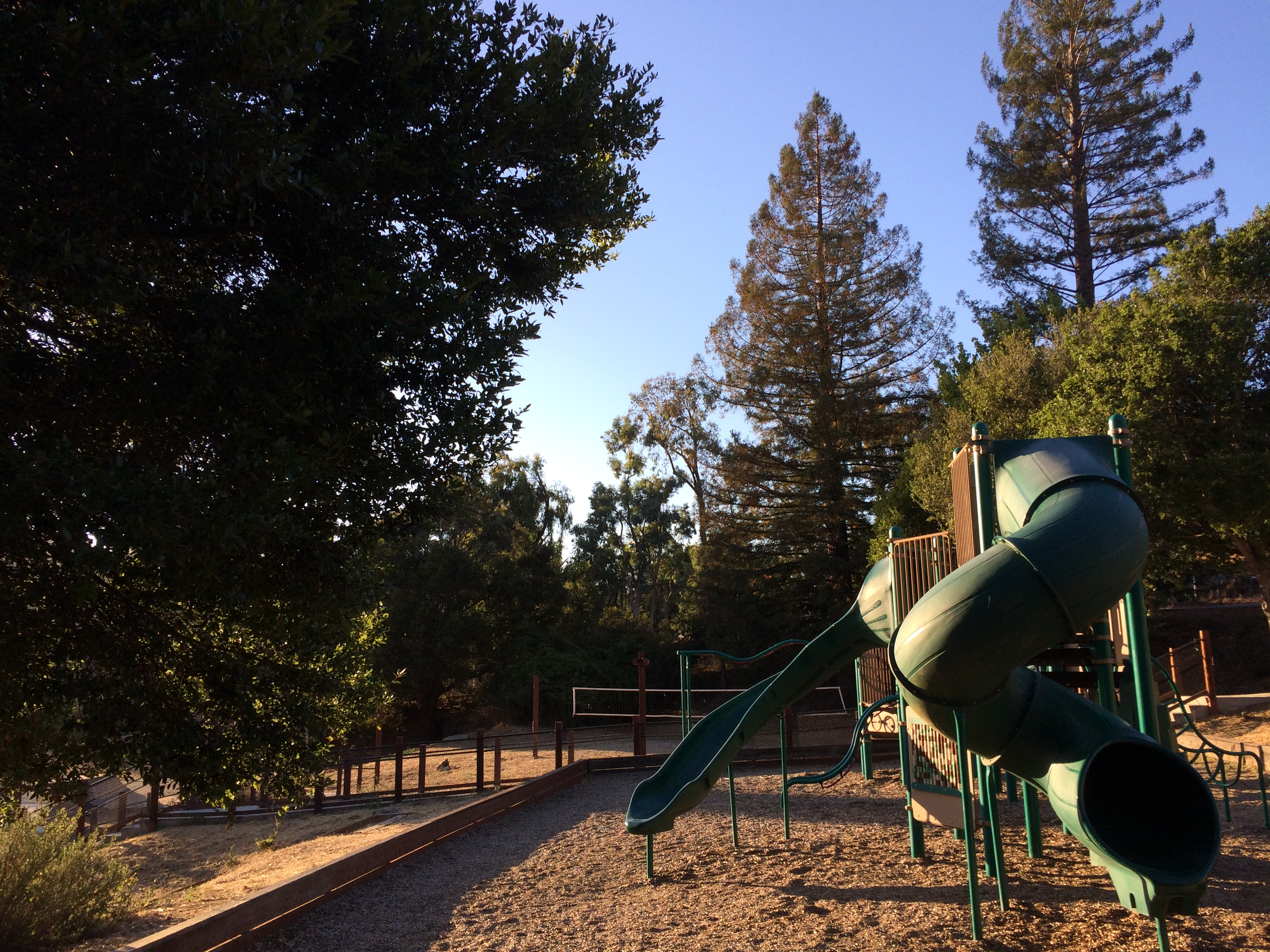
La Honda Playground.

== Schools ==
The town has a single school, La Honda Elementary, located within the La Honda-Pescadero Unified School District.

== Festivals ==
The town hosts the La Honda Fair & Music Festival every June, and holds an annual Fourth of July picnic at Play Bowl.

== Notable people ==
- Joe Cottonwood
- Richard Allen Davis
- Ken Kesey
- Neil Young
- Pegi Young
- The Merry Pranksters
- Reed Hastings

== See also ==
- Middleton Tract
- Skeggs Point
