= Area code 650 =

Area code for San Mateo County and parts of Santa Clara County, California

Coordinates: 37.5°N 122.3°W

Numbering plan areas in California (blue) and border states. Area code 650 is shown in red.

Area code 650 is a telephone area code in the North American Numbering Plan (NANP) for the San Francisco Bay Area in the U.S. state of California. It was split from area code 415 on August 2, 1997, and includes most of San Mateo County (except the northernmost portion), part of San Francisco, and the northwestern portion of Santa Clara County including Palo Alto, Mountain View, and Los Altos.

Prior to October 2021, area code 650 had telephone numbers assigned for the central office code 988. In 2020, 988 was designated nationwide as a dialing code for the National Suicide Prevention Lifeline, which created a conflict for exchanges that permit seven-digit dialing. This area code was therefore scheduled to transition to ten-digit dialing by October 24, 2021.

== Service area ==
=== San Mateo County ===
- Atherton
- Belmont
- Broadmoor
- Burlingame
- Colma
- Daly City (small portion in 415)
- East Palo Alto
- El Granada
- Emerald Lake Hills
- Foster City
- Half Moon Bay
- Highlands-Baywood Park
- Hillsborough
- Kings Mountain
- La Honda
- Ladera
- Loma Mar
- Los Trancos Woods
- Menlo Park
- Middleton Tract
- Millbrae
- Montara
- Moss Beach
- North Fair Oaks
- Pacifica
- Pescadero
- Portola Valley
- Princeton-by-the-Sea
- Redwood City
- San Bruno
- San Carlos
- San Gregorio
- San Mateo
- Sky Londa
- South San Francisco
- West Menlo Park
- Woodside

=== Santa Clara County ===
- Los Altos
- Los Altos Hills
- Loyola
- Mountain View
- Palo Alto
- Stanford
- Sunnyvale (western edge)

=== San Francisco County ===
- San Francisco

California area codes: 209/350, 213/323, 310/424, 408/669, 415/628, 510/341, 530, 559, 562, 619/858, 626, 650, 661, 707/369, 714/657, 760/442, 805/820, 818/747, 831, 909/840, 916/279, 925, 949, 951
	North: 415/628	
West: Pacific Ocean, 808	650	East: 510/341, 925
	South: 408/669, 831	
Hawaii area codes: 808
