= Middleton Tract, California =

Unincorporated community in California, United States

The gated Slate Creek Road entrance to the area.

Middleton Tract is a rural community in the coastal Redwoods of San Mateo County, California, United States. Unattributed press reports say the name Middleton Tract may have been applied to this area as early as 1925. In the present day, the name is official at the county government level. It appears on County Assessor's maps including County of San Mateo, Master Index Map, Revision 2, June, 1985, (Redwood City, California: County of San Mateo Assessor), page 40–41.

The community is located east of Portola Park Road and south of SR35 or Skyline Boulevard, near Portola State Park and the town of La Honda. The coordinate set 37°15′52″N 122°12′21″W (NAD27) is within the area of the community. The community is served by area code 650.

The community is east of Portola Park Road generally between Middleton Tract Road and Slate Creek Road. While the 1997 version of the Mindego Hill 7.5 minute quadrangle does not show Middleton Tract Road, it diverges east from Portola Park Road at a location called Crockers Curve (USGS feature ID 221842, NAD27 coordinates) 37°16′13″N 122°12′37″W. There are approximately two dozen mailboxes on the west side of Portola Park Road at this location. The intersection of Slate Creek Road and Portola Park Road is located approximately at latitude and longitude 37°15′57″N 122°12′35″W (NAD27). This is just outside the entrance station for Portola State Park.

Oil Creek Oil Field is east of the area.

A geographic feature, San Mateo County Fire Department Station 54 – also known as Middleton Tract according to the County of San Mateo's web site – supports this name as being official. Some of the roads and the fire station are shown on commercial maps such as Thomas Brothers Guides but the name Middleton Tract is not identified. The South Skyline Historical Society also cites this name in describing the area.

The ZIP Code is 94020 and the community is inside area code 650.

== History ==
Middleton Tract was purchased by William Middleton sometime prior to 1923. Middleton received title to the great expanse of land (approximately 640 acres (2.6 km^{2}) or one "section") by way of several deeds. The tract is legally described as: the northeast quarter of section 5; the east half of the southeast quarter of section 5; the west half of section 4; all in township 8 south, range 3 west, M.D.B. & M.

During the late 1880s portions of the land now known as the "Middleton Trac" were logged and the logs processed at the "Old Page Mill" site which is now located within Portola State Park. However much of the logging was perfunctory and many stands of old growth redwoods remained within the quarter section, including some very large trees in the Peters Creek drainage, and in several steep canyon areas. Some of these old growth trees exceed 40-foot (12 m) diameters at the base. Second growth trees soon sprouted from the logged stumps and today stand as very large trees many exceeding ten foot diameters at the base.

The Middleton Tract was subdivided according to a plan created by Middleton and parcels were sold for summer residences. Included in Middleton's plan of development was a prohibition on logging and hunting.

During the late 1920s and through the early 1950s a number of parcels were purchased by Stanford University luminaries and summer "cabins" were constructed. Among the owners of homes in the Middleton Tract was Frederick Terman. Terman founded the "towers of excellence" academic strategy that led Stanford to a leading role in engineering and electronics. J. Wallace Sterling, President of Stanford University from 1949 to 1968 built a rustic log cabin within the Middleton Tract as well as several university professors. Descendants of President Herbert Hoover also constructed several summer cabins within the tract. During the 1970s many of these summer homes became full-time residences and continue as full-time residences to this day. William Middleton died in 1962.

While the 640 acres (2.6 km^{2}) was subdivided according to Middleton's plan into 80 parcels, many of the parcels, particularly those to the south and those on steep slopes remained undeveloped.

Many of the undeveloped parcels were acquired by the Holmes Lumber Company in Santa Cruz County. Approximately 150 acres (0.61 km^{2}) were purchased and in 1986 Holmes Lumber applied for and received a "Timber Harvesting Permit" from the California State Board of Forestry allowing commercial logging activities on the property

Many residents of the Middleton Tract, fearing the devastation of logging within their peaceful rural community formed the Greater Middleton Association(GMA)and proceed to file a lawsuit to enforce Middleton's Covenants, Conditions, and Restrictions (CC&R's) reflected within the deeds to the parcels. Residents of the Middleton Tract Laura: A. Bryan, Timothy G. Geiser, and Malcolm McGilvray, Jr., were responsible for forming the GMA

After a lengthy court trial in Superior Court of San Mateo County, Presiding JudgeFrank Piombo ruled in favor of the GMA and enforced the CC&R's. Holmes Lumber was permanently enjoined from logging activity within the Middleton Tract.

Holmes Lumber Company appealed the lower court decision, but the Appellate Court upheld the lower courts decision as did the Supreme Court of the State of California. The commercial logging ban, under the legal concept of enforceable "equitable servitude" was upheld. An "equitable servitude" is a term used in the law of real property to describe a nonposseessory interest in land that operates much like a covenant running with the land.

The case may be found at "Greater Middleton Assn. v. Holmes Lumber Co.(1990) 222 Cal.App.3d 980, 271 Cal.Rptr. 917" and was one of the first legal decisions concerning "equitable servitudes" in the past 70 years. This case is frequently sited in both California court decisions and in other states as well. Much of the history of the Middleton Tract can be found within the court filings of both litigants.

Other notable personages who owned cabins in the Middleton Tract include famed Palo Alto Architect Birge Clark, Round Table Pizza founder William R. Larson, Stanford University Professor of Education Avlarez, and one of the Mozilla Foundation/Mozilla Corporation's founders Asa Dotzler.
