= Lost Man Creek Dam =

Upper Dam
- Official name: Lost Man Creek Dam
- Location: 0.8 miles upstream from Prairie Creek Fish Hatchery
- Coordinates: 41.3290°N 124.0214°W
- Purpose: Hatchery
- Status: Removed
- Opening date: 1936
- Demolition date: 1989

Dam and spillways
- Type of dam: Gravity dam
- Impounds: Lost Man Creek

Lost Man Creek Dam was a gravity dam used by the Prairie Creek Fish Hatchery in Humboldt County, California from 1936 to 1955.

== Location and description ==
The Lost Man Creek Dam was located inside the Redwood National and State Parks, in Humboldt County, California. It was positioned 0.8 miles (1.3 km) upstream from the confluence of Lost Man Creek with Prairie Creek and was 24 feet (7.3 m) in length with a width of 75 feet (23 m). The dam extended back southwards 100 feet (30 m).

== History ==
Due to overfishing in the northern region of California, streams in Humboldt County were failing to continue to be an abundant source of fishing. Since tourism in the area was in decline, in July 1926, the Humboldt Fish and Game Commission made plans to replenish all the trout streams within Humboldt County. The commission decided since the hatchery at Fort Seward is not large enough to supply all of the streams in this section of the state, it would be cost-effective and economically beneficial to build the hatcheries closer to where the fish would be deposited. On August 18, 1927, the president of the California Fish and Game Commission, Isadore Zellerbach, released a statement saying that "egg-taking stations will be established on Smith River in Del Norte County and Prairie Creek in Humboldt County."

In 1927, about four miles north of Orick, California, the Prairie Creek Fish Hatchery was built in temporary facilities at the junction of Prairie Creek and Lost Man Creek to stimulate the growth of cutthroat, chinook, steelhead, and silverside fish.

In 1936, the California Department of Fish and Game set up the Prairie Creek Fish Hatchery into a permanent facility, which included the Lost Man Creek Dam to serve as its water source. The dam was also referred to as the upper dam. The upper dam where the pipeline began consisted of a wood-frame structure of rocks, with a trap and holding boxes at the north end. The pipeline ended at a water filter located behind the east end of the hatchery.

In the mid-forties, extensive logging was conducted above the watershed, which minimized water flow. This contributed to extensive sediment build up creating a barrier for the chinook salmon's migration. By 1955, the hatchery required extensive repairs, so operations were largely discontinued and production was replaced by the Cedar Creek Experimental Station.

On September 15, 1961, the property was given to Humboldt County, at no cost, by order of the California State Assembly:

"The property was transferred without cost to be used only as a fish hatchery for the following reasons: "The Legislature finds that there is an urgent need that all available facilities are used to produce fish for the citizens of this State and that use of this property by the County of Humboldt is a state public purpose since it will permit the continued operation of a fish hatchery which would otherwise be discontinued for economic reasons"

— California State Assembly 1961

Numerous changes were made at the hatchery during the 1960s. Since the upper dam was, by this time, completely unserviceable and created a barrier for the chinook salmon's migration, it was replaced by the lower dam. The lower dam's concrete construction was completed in August 1969 and is located upstream about 100 feet from the pipeline crossing.

The upper dam was removed by Redwood National Park in August 1989. Removal of the dam increased salmonid spawning access and use of 2.9 km of upstream habitat in the creek.

The Prairie Creek Hatchery ceased operations in 1992.
