= Joe Cottonwood =

American poet

- Education: Washington University in St. Louis (BA)
- Occupations: Author; poet
- Children: 3
- Writing career
- Genre: Fiction

Joe Cottonwood (born August 19, 1947) is an American author of fiction and poetry for adults and children. He was born August 19, 1947 and lives in La Honda, California. His novels for adults include Famous Potatoes (1978) and Clear Heart (2009). His novels for children and young adults include Quake! (1995) and The San Puerco Trilogy (1990–1996).

== Early life ==
Cottonwood grew up in Bethesda, Maryland. His mother and father were both scientists.

== Education ==
Cottonwood earned a Bachelor of Arts degree from Washington University in St. Louis, in 1970, majoring in English "with a heavy dose of science."

== Personal life ==
From 1970 to 1976 Cottonwood worked as a computer operator in St. Louis, San Francisco, Philadelphia, and Mountain View, California. Since 1976 Cottonwood has worked in the building trades as a carpenter, plumber, and electrician and eventually became a general contractor doing house repairs. Since 1978 he has lived in the small mountain town of La Honda, California, where he and his wife have raised three children. Cottonwood has said, "I used to bristle at being called a hippie but now I'm proud to be called an Old Hippie. La Honda is no longer the Acid Tests / Hells Angels hangout of the sixties, but it is still full of cranks, dreamers, and a few astonishing outlaws".

Cottonwood is the co-host of a La Honda tradition known as Lit Night, which is a monthly literary gathering in a bar with an open mic for locals to read their own or other people's works before a live, somewhat lubricated audience. The literary works range from cowboy poetry to Shakespearean drama. Their motto: "Get Lit!"

== Writing career ==
Cottonwood's first success was his novel Famous Potatoes, published in 1978, often called an "underground novel" due to its countercultural readership and its title. Cottonwood has said that during every college break he would set out hitchhiking around the United States without money or a backpack, going wherever rides would take him. The experiences formed the basis of Famous Potatoes.

One of Cottonwood's first plumbing jobs was what should have been a half-day project repairing a woman's shower. It turned into a three-day botch, but in the process he became friends with the woman's boyfriend (John Daniel) who wanted to be a book editor. They decided to jointly publish Famous Potatoes under the imprint of No Dead Lines Press. On the day of the press run, Cottonwood got a phone call from a New York City publisher (Seymour Lawrence, publisher of Kurt Vonnegut and Richard Brautigan) who wanted to buy the book on the condition that there be no competing self-published edition. It was too late to stop the press, so as 500 copies were being printed Cottonwood agreed never to sell them. He still has them.

Cottonwood's novels for younger readers have been commended by educators for their content and tone and by youngsters for their plot and characters: Quake! about the 1989 World Series earthquake; The San Puerco Trilogy of novels about three scrappy boys in the small town of San Puerco, California (which bears a remarkable resemblance to La Honda, California); and the most recent, Four Dog Riot, published in 2011.

His most recent novel for adult readers, Clear Heart— which he describes as a love story involving nail guns, wet concrete and strong women —appears popular among readers generally and has special resonance among carpenters and tradespeople.

Cottonwood's 2013 memoir, 99 Jobs: Blood, Sweat, and Houses, based on his experiences as a contractor, carpenter, plumber, and electrician, is available electronically and in print. Readers and reviewers have praised its humor and authenticity.

Cottonwood has issued podcasts of five of his novels. The first draft of the memoir published as 99 Jobs began as an ongoing blog, with readers invited to comment. He calls it "open source editing".

Readers have compared his work to that of John Steinbeck and Mark Twain.

He and his work have been profiled in local and regional publications.

== Novels for children and young adults ==
The Adventures of Boone Barnaby (The San Puerco Trilogy) (Scholastic, 1990)

Danny Ain't (The San Puerco Trilogy) (Scholastic 1992)

Quake! (Scholastic 1995)

Babcock (The San Puerco Trilogy) (Scholastic 1996)

Four Dog Riot (ebook, 2011)

== Novels for adults ==
The Naked Computer (Black Dragon Books 1974)

Famous Potatoes (No Dead Lines Press 1978)

Famous Potatoes (Delacorte/Seymour Lawrence 1979)

Frank City (Goodbye) (Delacorte/Seymour Lawrence 1981)

Clear Heart (audiobook: Podiobooks.com 2007, winner of the 2008 Founders Choice Award; BookSurge Publishing 2008).

== Books of poetry ==
Son of a Poet (John Daniel 1986). Foggy Dog: Poems of the Pacific Coast (Clear Heart Books 2018). Random Saints (Kelsay Books 2020).

== Honors ==
- Danny Ain't won the BABRA Award (Bay Area Book Reviewers Association) as Best Book for Children in 1992.
- The audiobook of Clear Heart won the Founders Choice Award for "excellence in serialized audiobook production" in 2008.
- The audiobooks of Boone Barnaby and Babcock won the Founders Choice Award for "impeccable quality" in 2009.
- 99 Jobs won First Place for nonfiction in the 2014 IndieReader Discovery Awards.
