= Phleger Estate =

Park in San Mateo County, California, U.S.

Coordinates: 37°27′N 122°18.5′W

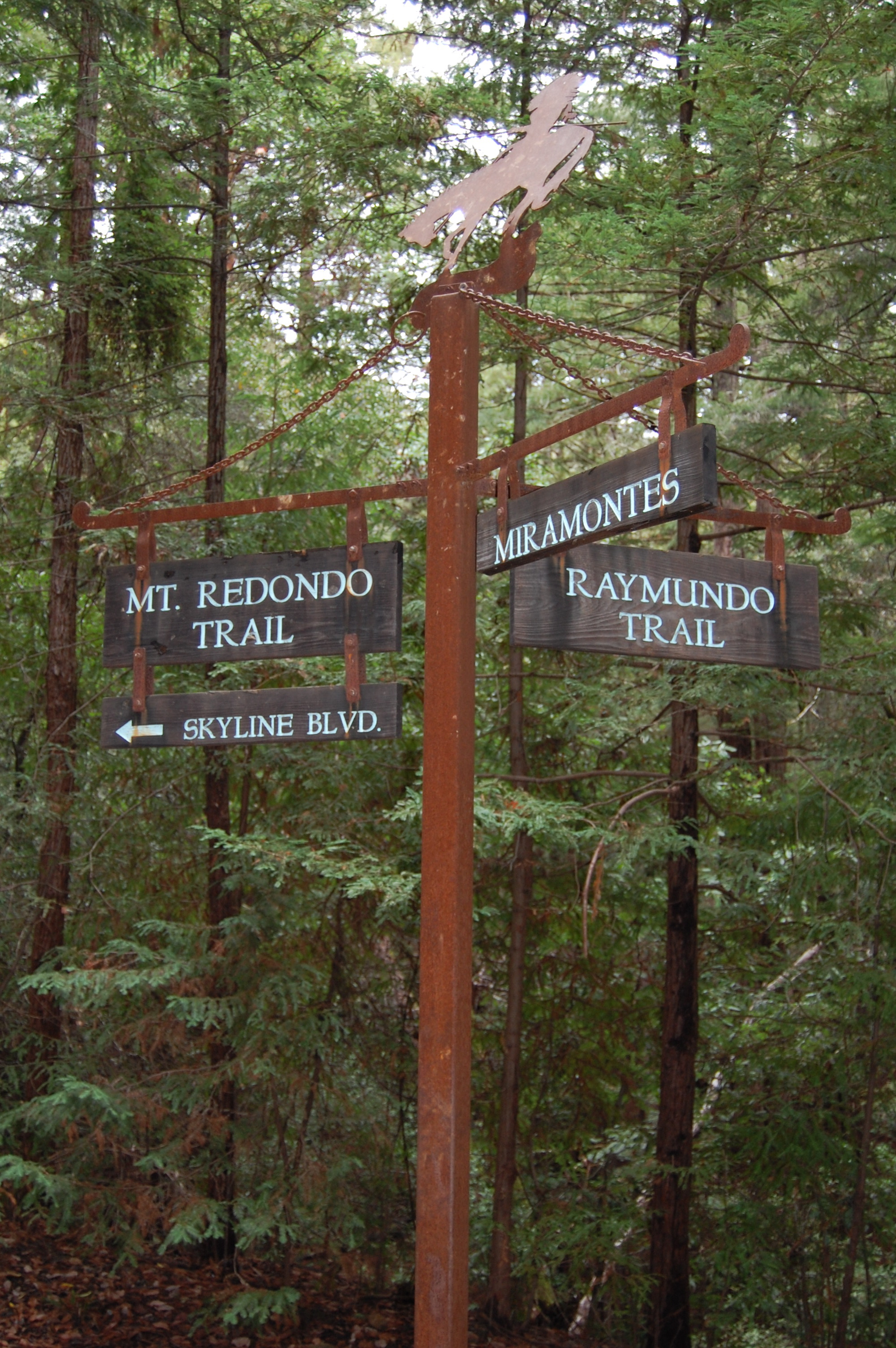
Trail signs at the Phleger Estate

The Phleger Estate is a park in San Mateo County, California, United States. The park is located outside the town of Woodside and adjacent to Huddart County Park. The park was acquired in 1991 by the Peninsula Open Space Trust (POST) for $25 million and is now part of the Golden Gate National Recreation Area (GGNRA).

== History ==
When the Spanish arrived on the San Francisco Peninsula in 1769, the land from Belmont south to Redwood City, and from the Bay into the foothills including Woodside, Huddart Park and the Phleger Estate was occupied by the Lamchin local tribe of the Ohlone people. This tribe was encountered by the Portolà expedition as it descended from Sweeney Ridge to San Francisquito Creek through what Portola called the Cañada de San Francisco (now traversed by Cañada Road). The padres spoke of the Lamchin as possessing four villages, Cachanigtac, Guloisnistac, Oromstac and Supichon, but moved them to Mission San Francisco de Asís between 1784 and 1793 for forced Christianization and indentured servitude.

After secularization of the California missions, Governor Juan Bautista Alvarado granted the 12,545-acre Rancho Cañada de Raymundo (5,077 ha) which now includes the Phleger Estate to John Coppinger in 1841. Coppinger was a British seaman who deserted his ship in San Francisco in 1835 but he went on to support Governor Alvarado's revolt against the Mexico-installed Governor Gutiérrez in Monterey in 1836. When Coppinger died in 1847, his widow Maria Luisa Soto Coppinger married another Irish seaman, Captain John Greer, who sold off timber rights on the Rancho and is notable for laying out Cañada Road in 1862.

The area Redwoods were an important source of lumber exports. According to Mexican government records of 1841, 100,000 board feet of wood were ready at the embarcadero near Mission Santa Clara for export to the Hawaiian Islands, presumably the source of this timber was Coppinger's Rancho. The wooded area was a refuge for American, English, Scots and Irish expatriates who cut timber and distilled alcohol for sale. The California Gold Rush, beginning in 1848 catalyzed logging operations to support the explosive growth of the city of San Francisco. By the 1860s most of the logger's mills had moved west over the Skyline, having depleted the eastern slope of trees.

Willard Whipple was one of many area lumbermen who dragged logs to the port at Redwood City. His Whipple's Mill Road has come to be known as Whipple Avenue. He was a Union sympathizer in the Civil War and named the creek on which his mills operated West Union Creek. Whipple built his steam-powered Upper Mill in late 1852 at the site of today's Phleger House (now occupied by Gordon and Betty Moore) on the Phleger Estate.

About 1908, William Bourn completely acquired the Spring Valley Water Company, which closed its lands (which included the Phleger Estate, Bourn's estate "Filoli" and today's Crystal Springs Reservoirs) to agriculture, logging and vineyards. The two Crystal Springs lakes and San Andreas Lake used to be known as Spring Valley Lakes for the Spring Valley Water Company which took its name with it from its original location at the Spring Valley was between Mason and Taylor Streets, and Washington and Broadway Streets in San Francisco, where the water company started. When the company went south for more water, the Spring Valley name was carried south too. In 1915, Bourn hired Willis Polk to build Filoli, and moved in in 1917.

Just before Bourn sold the Spring Valley Water Company to the city of San Francisco, he allowed a Company Vice President, Samuel P. Eastman, to create his own estate, "Mountain Meadow", just south of Filoli. Eastman contracted Gardner Dailey, who had just left the Willis Polk architectural firm, to design his estate home, which was completed in 1927. The 8,000-square foot house, with a tiled mission revival style roof, was situated to permit views of both the second-growth redwoods and oak woodlands. In 1937, Herman and Mary Elena Phleger (née Macondray) began acquiring this watershed property, that they referred to as "the home place" ultimately assembling an estate of 1,315 acres (532 ha). Their nearest neighbors were the Roth family, the new owners of Filoli, a mile to the north.

Herman was raised in Sacramento to a family of modest means, and became a lawyer and diplomat after attending the University of California Berkeley (B.S. 1912) and studying law at Harvard Law School. He co-founded the law firm of Brobeck, Phleger & Harrison. Mary Elena Macondray Phleger was the granddaughter of prominent Peninsula family scion Faxon Dean Atherton and San Franciscan Frederick W. Macondray. Herman Phleger allowed fellow equestrians use of the property's scenic Raymundo Trail which runs through the estate. Herman served as a director of the Save the Redwoods League for 20 years. Which was part of why Herman and Mary Elena wanted to preserve the 1,315 acres (532 ha). In 1990 Mary Elena along with extended family began negotiating with the Peninsula Open Space Trust (POST) to acquire the land, which was valued at $30 million. POST would raise the money and then in turn, turn the land over to the National Park Service. In 1990 Mary Elena passed away and her remaining child Mary Elena "Polly" Goodan (née Phleger) represented the family and parent's wishes. In 1994, the family completed the sale to POST for $21 million which was quite a contribution by the family considering the true value of the property. POST turned over the Phleger Estate to the National Park Service. Because the latter did not want the Phleger mansion, Audrey Rust convinced Gordon Moore, the founder of Intel Corporation and his wife Betty to purchase the home and 24 acres (9.7 ha) of what would become a conservation easement for $6 million. Members of the Phleger family still own a 23-acre parcel (9.3 ha) on the estate.

On December 23, 1994, San Mateo Times staff writer, Marshall Wilson, reported: "Hikers and nature lovers can enjoy more than 1,200 acres (490 ha) of hills and canyons now that the Phleger Estate officially has been added to the National Park System, and quoted Audrey Rust as saying: "I feel this has been my life." On April 29, 1995, the Phleger Estate was dedicated as part of the GGNRA. Polly Phleger Goodan, who grew up on the estate and rode a horse from her home daily to attend college at Stanford (B.A. 1944), died in 2005.

== Geography ==
The 1,084 acres (439 ha) parcel is located west of Cañada Road and east of Skyline Boulevard on the eastern slope of Kings Mountain on the Sierra Morena portion of the Santa Cruz Mountains. The Phleger Estate lies between San Mateo County's Huddart Park to the south and Filoli to the north on the San Francisco Peninsula. This area was once a portion of Rancho Cañada de Raymundo which was aggressively logged during the nineteenth century. After entering the estate from Cañada and Edgewood Roads, Phleger Road immediately crosses the south fork of Laguna Creek which flows north to Upper Crystal Springs Reservoir. Higher up the slope three minor tributaries flow into West Union Creek, which travels southeast to Adobe Corner in the town of Woodside where it joins Bear Gulch Creek, which in turn flows to San Francisquito Creek and ultimately, San Francisco Bay.

== Trails ==
There are several hiking trails through the park, access is limited to hikers and equestrians (on some trails). The trails are marked with unique trail signs and pass through a mix of second growth redwood forests and oak woodlands. In the lower elevations of the park the Miramontes Trail follows West Union Creek. The Lonely Trail climbs steeply from the valley to Skyline Boulevard. Wildlife in the park includes a variety of birds, Banana slugs, and the Coast Range Newt.

The park is bounded to the north by San Francisco watershed land, to the west by Skyline Blvd (CA Highway 35), and to the south by Huddart County Park. The area east of the park is private property and is off limits to hikers. Access to the trails is from the parking area in Huddart County Park (off Kings Mountain Road). There is park access via a trailhead on Skyline Blvd.
