= Prairie Creek Fish Hatchery =

- U.S. National Register of Historic Places
- U.S. Historic district
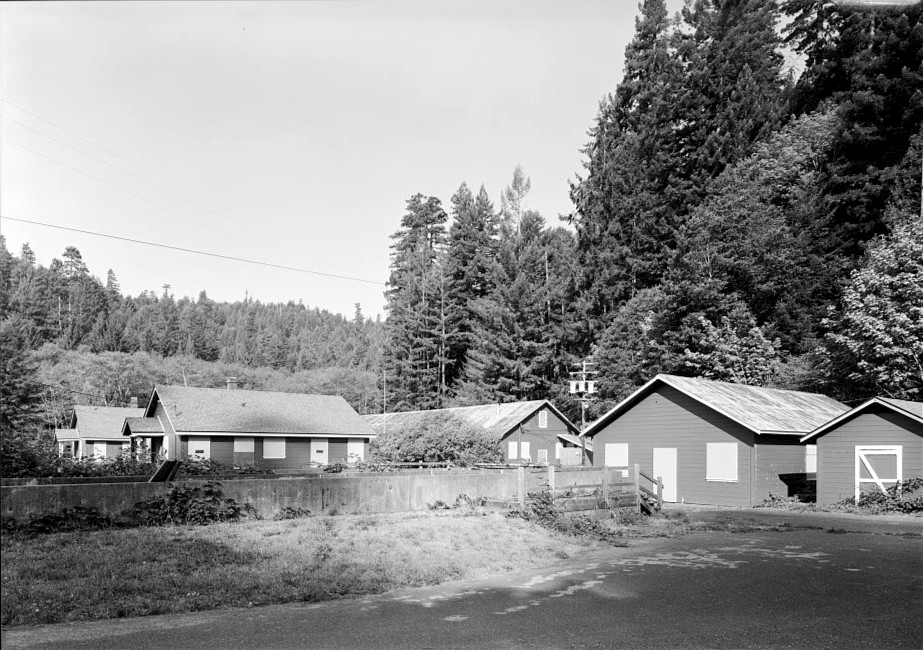
- Hatchery complex

- Location within California Location within the United States
- Location: State Highway 101, Milepost 124.83 North of Orick, California (Redwood National and State Parks)
- Coordinates: 41°19′59″N 124°1′45″W
- Area: 6.2 acres (2.5 ha)
- Built: 1936
- Architect: California Division of Architecture
- Architectural style: Late 19th And 20th Century Revivals
- NRHP reference No.: 00000034
- Added to NRHP: 04 February 2000

The Prairie Creek Fish Hatchery near Orick, Humboldt County, California was one of the first small local fish hatcheries developed to improve the area's sport and commercial fishing, and is one of only three remaining hatcheries built in California from 1871 to 1946.

== History ==
During a survey conducted by north coast streams in 1927, coast cutthroat trout eggs were discovered on Lost Man Creek above the confluence with Prairie Creek. About a year later, traps and a temporary hatchery were built. By the spring of 1928, they had 30 troughs for the 208,000 Coho salmon and 1,400,000 steelhead eggs collected. The constant stream of fresh water needed was delivered through 12-inch flume that was nearly 2,500 feet long from behind a dam on Lost Man Creek. The early success of the temporary hatchery resulted in the continuation of the hatchery experiment during the early 1930s and hatchery steelhead, cutthroat trout, Coho salmon, and King salmon, were released to the wild.

The site of the temporary hatchery was abandoned and the present hatchery was completely rebuilt in 1936 on approximately the same footprint as the 62-acre historic district with the five buildings and seven contributing structures recognized today: the hatchery, superintendent's house, assistant's house, sidewalks, garage shop, shed, pipeline stream crossing, and four of the round outdoor water tanks. The fifth tank was added later. Several buildings were reworked and removed over the time of operation and the dam and reservoir were removed in 1989.

The hatchery continued production of trout and salmon during the 1940s, but as the water supply deteriorated as mechanized logging increased following World War II. Humboldt County began operating the hatchery in 1957. The property was conveyed to Humboldt County by the California State Assembly on 15 September 1961 and continued operation until 31 October 1992.

== Indomitable salmon ==
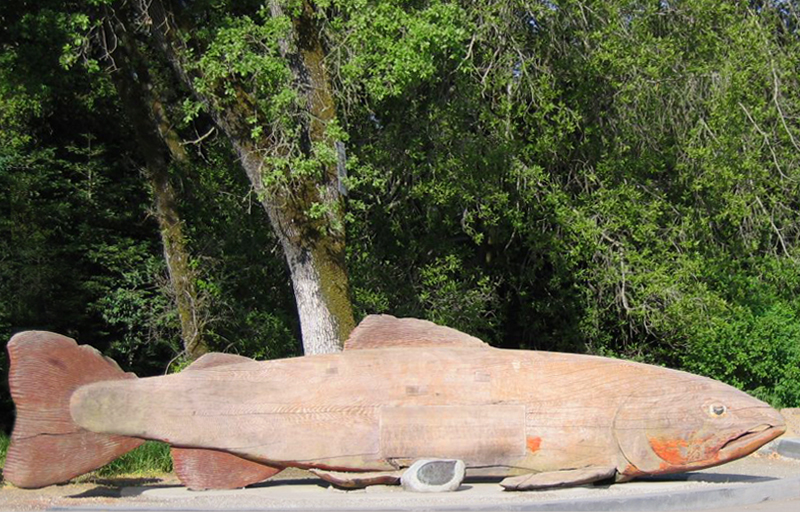
The sculpture of the Indomitable salmon, installed March 5, 1974 at the Prairie Creek Fish Hatchery, currently outside Buck's of Woodside restaurant in San Mateo County, California.

On 2 December 1964, Hatchery Superintendent Ken Johnson found a 2-year-old marked coho salmon swimming in a tank of newborn fish, exactly where he had been raised two years earlier. To reach the tank, he had to travel from the Pacific Ocean up Redwood Creek, turn into Lost Man Creek, run up a ditch, through a 1.5 feet (0.46 m) culvert under Highway 101, through a storm sewer, and up the hatchery waste water through a 4 inches (10 cm) drainage pipe, making a 90 degree turn and a 2.5 feet (0.76 m) vertical jump inside the pipe. Finally, he rammed through an overhead wire mesh screen, probably by jumping, to get into the rearing pond.

The fish was rapidly nicknamed Indomitable by the local press. Looking for how he got into the tank, workers found 72 more marked coho jack salmon of the same age class stuck in the flume or drainage pipe on the way to the hatchling pond. The story of Indomitable received massive press coverage, inspired a book, and continues to be cited as one of the amazing feats of animal migration. From 1974 to 1992 two large redwood sculptures of Indomitable were sequentially mounted outside the hatchery. The first, a 22 feet (6.7 m), two-ton sculpture by Floyd Davis of Gasquet, California was made and installed in 1974 after fundraising efforts by System 99 Vice-president Ed Henke. In 1992, this sculpture was judged too weathered to be displayed. Following donations by Arcata Redwood Company, Miller Farms Saw Shop and Humboldt County Supervisor, Anna Sparks, the second fish was carved on site by Mark Leppanen of Arcata. When the Hatchery was closed on 31 October 1992, the second sculpture was removed and stored at the Arcata/Eureka airport until 14 October 1997 when the Humboldt County Board of Supervisors sold it to the North Coast Co-op grocery store in Arcata for $5,005 and displayed inside the store. Still at Prairie Creek are Indomitable's mounting pole, concrete pad and dedication marker. The original Davis sculpture was sold by the Humboldt County Board of Supervisors and is currently installed outside Buck's of Woodside restaurant.

== See also ==
- Lost Man Creek Dam

== Additional Sources ==
- Corbett, Michael; Denise Bradley (May 1997). Final Historic Resources Study Report for Prairie Creek Fish Hatchery, Redwood National and State Parks, Humboldt County California (PDF). Contract Number 1443RP8480-96-001. pp. 53 pages.
- "Orick Townspeople Honor Their Heroic Salmon; Monument for Indomitable". Sacramento Bee. June 2, 1974. pp. C1–C4.
- Angney, Heather (December 1, 1996). "Whither a Wooden Woodside Fish Not Fit for a Smallish Dish?". Oakland Tribune. pp. C-9.
- Angney, Heather (December 24, 1996). "Carving Still Makes for One Heck of Fish Story". San Mateo County Times.
- Editorial (August 27, 1966). "A Fish Story". The Humboldt Times. p. 4.
- Bernay, Xan (November 23, 1992). "Prairie Creek Fish Hatchery Fades into History". The Eureka Times-Standard. pp. Al.
