= Kings Mountain, California =

Unincorporated community in California, United States

Kings Mountain
- Unincorporated community
- Location within the state of California Kings Mountain (the United States)
- Coordinates: 37°25′14″N 122°19′24″W
- Country: United States
- State: California
- County: San Mateo
- Time zone: UTC-8 (Pacific (PST))
  - Summer (DST): UTC-7 (PDT)
- ZIP codes: 94062
- Area code: 650

Kings Mountain is an unincorporated community in San Mateo County, California, United States, located along State Route 35 (Skyline Boulevard) between Skeggs Point and Pise Mountain. This is approximately five miles (8 km) north of Woodside Road (SR84). In the U.S. Geological Survey, National Geographic Names Database, the area is identified only as a geographic feature of type "summit" and not as a populated place. The community is inside area code 650 and uses the Woodside ZIP Code 94062.

== Profile ==
The community derived its name from a former 19th-century landmark hotel, the "Kings Mountain Browhouse", run by the Frank King family. Long-time nationally prominent residents include birth control pill inventor and novelist Carl Djerassi; billionaire investor, Forbes columnist, and local historian Kenneth Fisher; and rock 'n' roll legend Neil Young.

On the Woodside, California, 7.5-minute quadrangle, (1997), features supporting the name include Kings Mountain Road and Kings Mountain School. The school, a TK-5 institution, is operated by Cabrillo School District of Half Moon Bay and was the recipient of the 2008 Distinguished Schools award from the State of California.

County government documents also identify a Kings Mountain Fire Station and Community Center at 13899 Skyline Boulevard. This is between Kings Mountain Road and Pise Mountain. Today the Kings Mountain Volunteer Fire Brigade responds to over 160 calls a year, many of them to assist weekend bicyclists and hikers who are enjoying the redwood forest. Kings Mountain Road is steep and twisty, providing a challenging climb and descent for cyclists.

== High Point ==
The area includes Sierra Morena (also called Morena Sierra, "brown mountain"), which is 2,417 feet (737 m) above sea level according to the U.S. Geological Survey maps. It is near Skeggs Point (elevation 2,315 feet), the vista point and parking lot along Skyline Boulevard. Due to the presence of communication antennas and microwave equipment, the gravel road leading to Sierra Morena is behind a chain link fence and closed to the public.

== Climate ==
Much of the area experiences heavy wet snows every several years; on rare occasions snowfall has exceeded a foot in depth. The National Weather Service does not maintain a station in the area (there are cooperative stations in Ben Lomond, California and Woodside, California), but normal annual rainfall has been estimated to exceed 50 inches (1,300 mm). Heavy fog is very common in the area, especially in the summer months, and usually clears back to the coast from the late morning to early evening. Normal temperatures in January range from the lower fifties to upper thirties, and in July from upper seventies to lower fifties.

== Kings Mountain Art Fair ==
An annual fine arts fair is held on Labor Day weekend, primarily to support the operations of the Kings Mountain Volunteer Fire Brigade. The Fair also benefits Kings Mountain Elementary School, a California "Distinguished School," and several other community organizations. A pancake breakfast, lunch, food and drinks are served at the Fair, also to fund the fire department and the school. There are free shuttles up and down Skyline Blvd. to ease the parking problems. The first Kings Mountain Art Fair was held in 1963, and the Fair is organized and run entirely by volunteers from the Kings Mountain community. The fair is consistently ranked among the best in California.

== Government Land ==
The community is encircled by government reservations. The San Francisco Peninsula Watershed, owned by the City and County of San Francisco, is north. East of the community is Huddart County Park and the adjoining Phleger Estate operated by the County of San Mateo. To the south and west is Midpeninsula Regional Open Space District's Purisima Creek Redwoods Open Space Preserve.

== History ==
During the late 19th century, an extensive timber and saw-milling industry felled thousands of acres of virgin redwoods. The remaining and substantial redwood forests are nearly all second-growth trees. Until the 1950s, a majority of Kings Mountain's inhabitants were summer residents, including residents of Henrik Ibsen Park, a private 40-acre (160,000 m^{2}) recreational facility for Sons of Norway members from San Francisco. More recently, however, since the building of Interstate 280 in the 1960s and '70s, making San Francisco only a 40-minute commute, and with a booming Silicon Valley economy, Kings Mountain has become a full-time residential community, with million-dollar homes now outnumbering rustic cabins.

In 1953, BCPA Flight 304 crashed into Kings Mountain, killing all passengers aboard, including pianist William Kapell and eighteen others.

== See also ==
- Sky Londa, California also known as Skylonda.
- Santa Cruz Mountains
- State Route 35 (Skyline Boulevard)
- Purisima Creek Redwoods Open Space Preserve
