= Buck's of Woodside =

Coordinates: 37°25′46.8″N 122°15′18.4″W

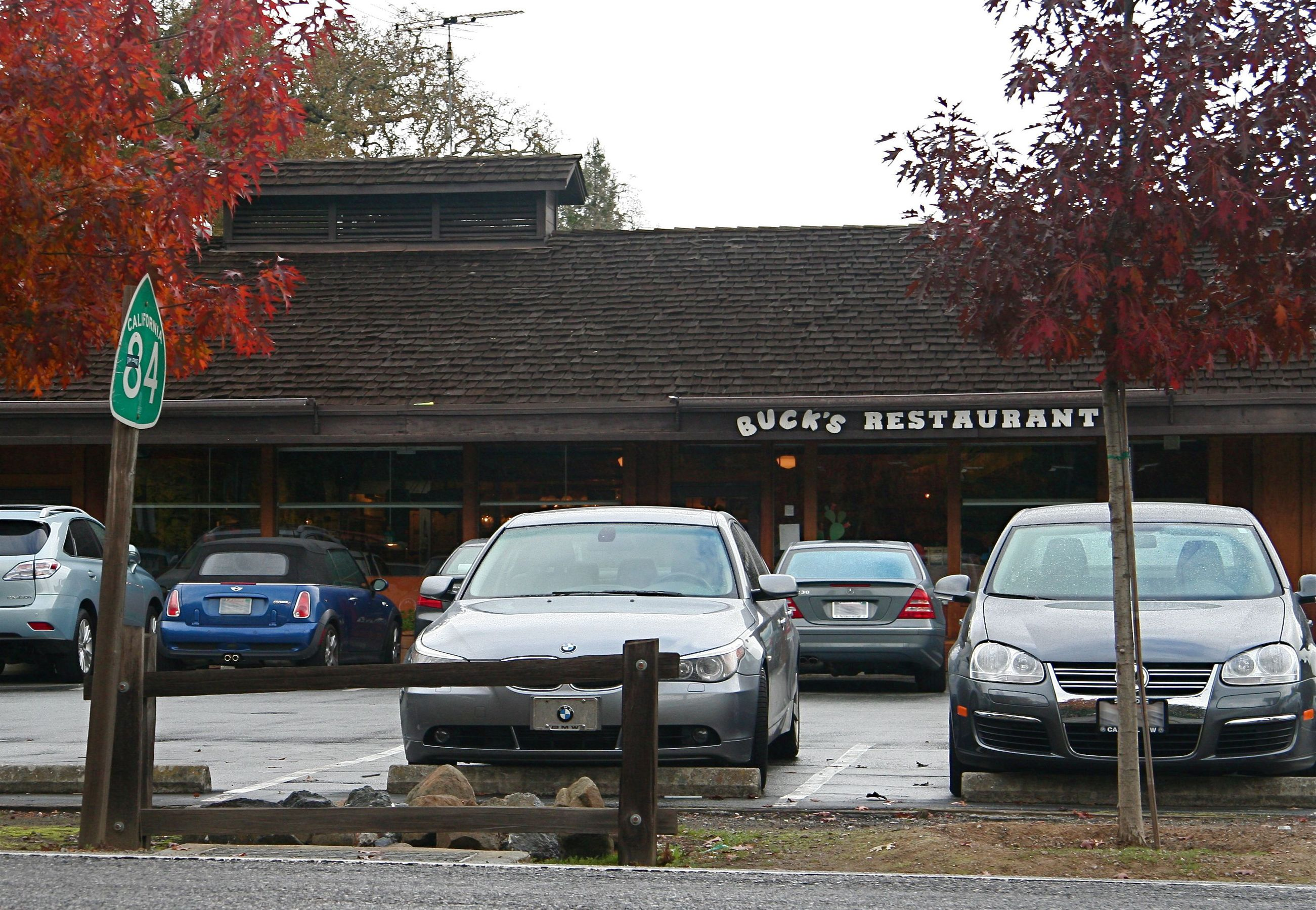
- Interactive map of Buck's of Woodside

Restaurant information
- Established: 1991
- Owners: Dylan,Tyler, Rowan MacNiven
- Food type: Traditional American
- Location: 3062 Woodside Rd., Woodside, California
- Website: buckswoodside.com

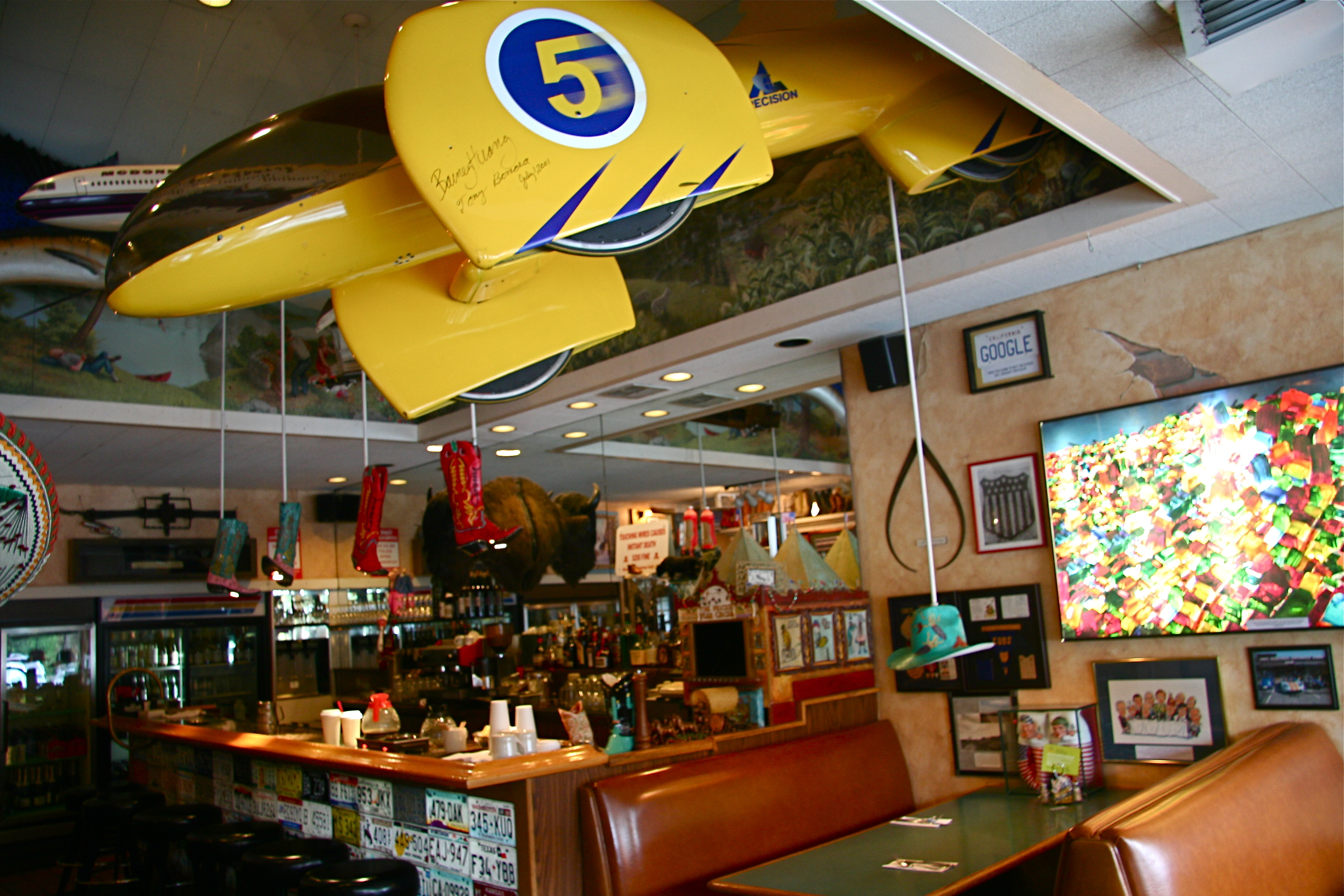
Bar at Buck's of Woodside

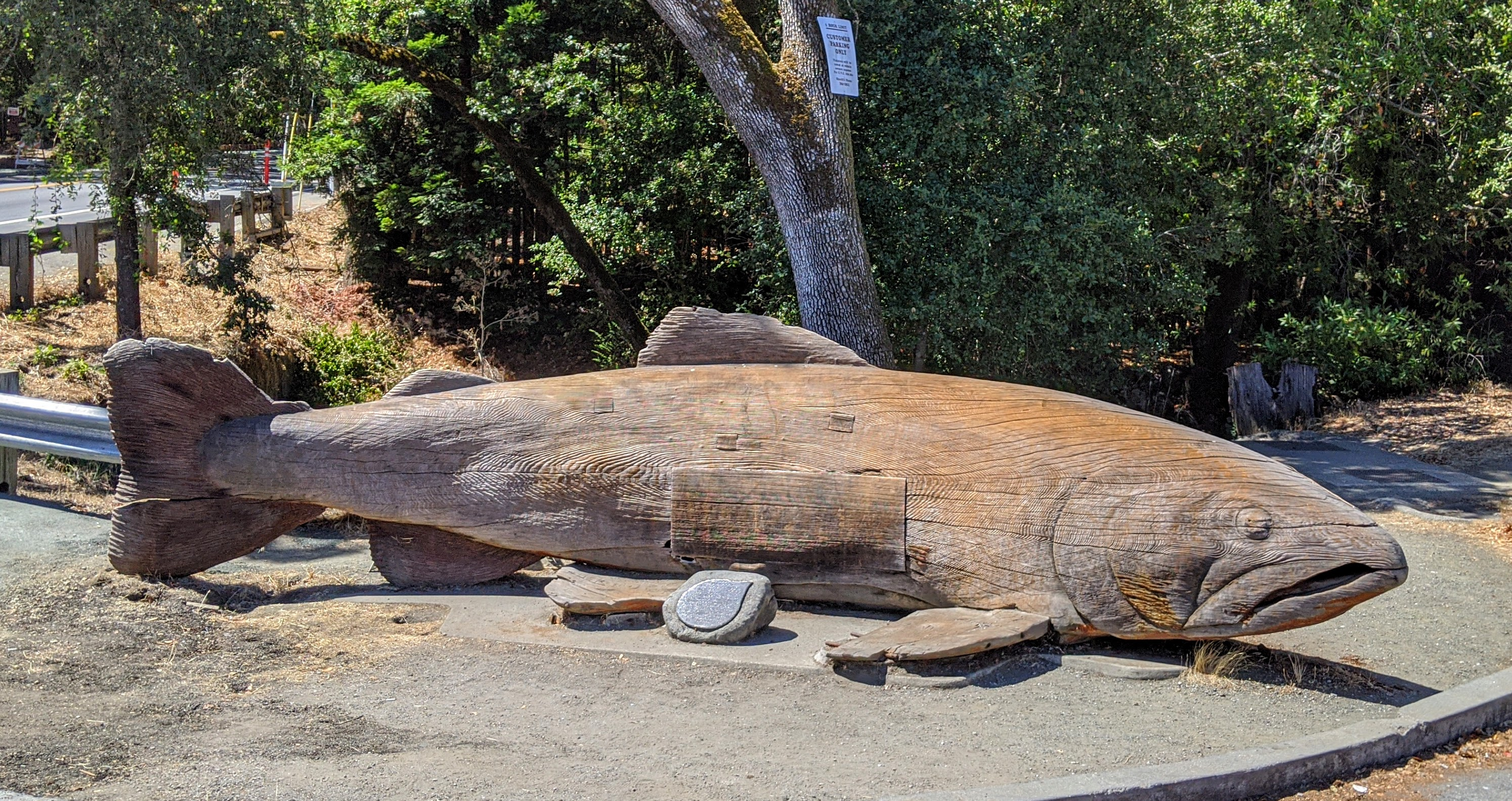
The sculpture of the Indomitable salmon, installed March 5, 1974 at the Prairie Creek Fish Hatchery, currently outside Buck's of Woodside restaurant in San Mateo County, California.

Buck's of Woodside (Locally known as: Buck's) is a restaurant in Woodside, California, that has gained fame as a meeting place for venture capitalists and tech entrepreneurs. Like nearby Sand Hill Road, Buck's has become a fixture of Silicon Valley.

== About ==
Jamis MacNiven left his career in construction to open the restaurant in 1991. Unhappy with local restaurants, MacNiven decided to create his own. By 1995, when the dot-com boom began, word of mouth spread that Buck's was a hotspot for Silicon Valley's most powerful.

The restaurant is close to both Sand Hill Road—home to the majority of Silicon Valley's venture capitalists—and Stanford University. Netscape, PayPal, Hotmail and Tesla Motors are among the companies whose entrepreneurs held early meetings at Buck's.

"Breakfast at Buck's" is the title of the introduction of the book, The Startup Game: Inside the Partnership between Venture Capitalists and Entrepreneurs, by venture capitalist Bill Draper.

In 2003, Forbes magazine named Buck's one of its top business restaurants.

The interior of Buck's features colorful decor, including cowboy boots, a talking buffalo head, a model of the Statue of Liberty holding an ice cream sundae, and a stuffed alligator.

According to MacNiven, Steve Jobs is one of the few Silicon Valley icons who never set foot in his restaurant; MacNiven and the Apple co-founder had a falling out in the 1980s after Jobs hired him to remodel his house. Buck's nevertheless has a rare photo of Jobs, wearing a set of Groucho glasses, on display.

When the COVID-19 pandemic hit in the spring of 2020, and the resulting restaurant shut-down, Jamis MacNiven decided to retire. In August 2020 Buck's was re-opened by his sons (Dylan, Tyler & Rowan MacNiven) who now run it.
