= Skeggs Point (California) =

Scenic turnout

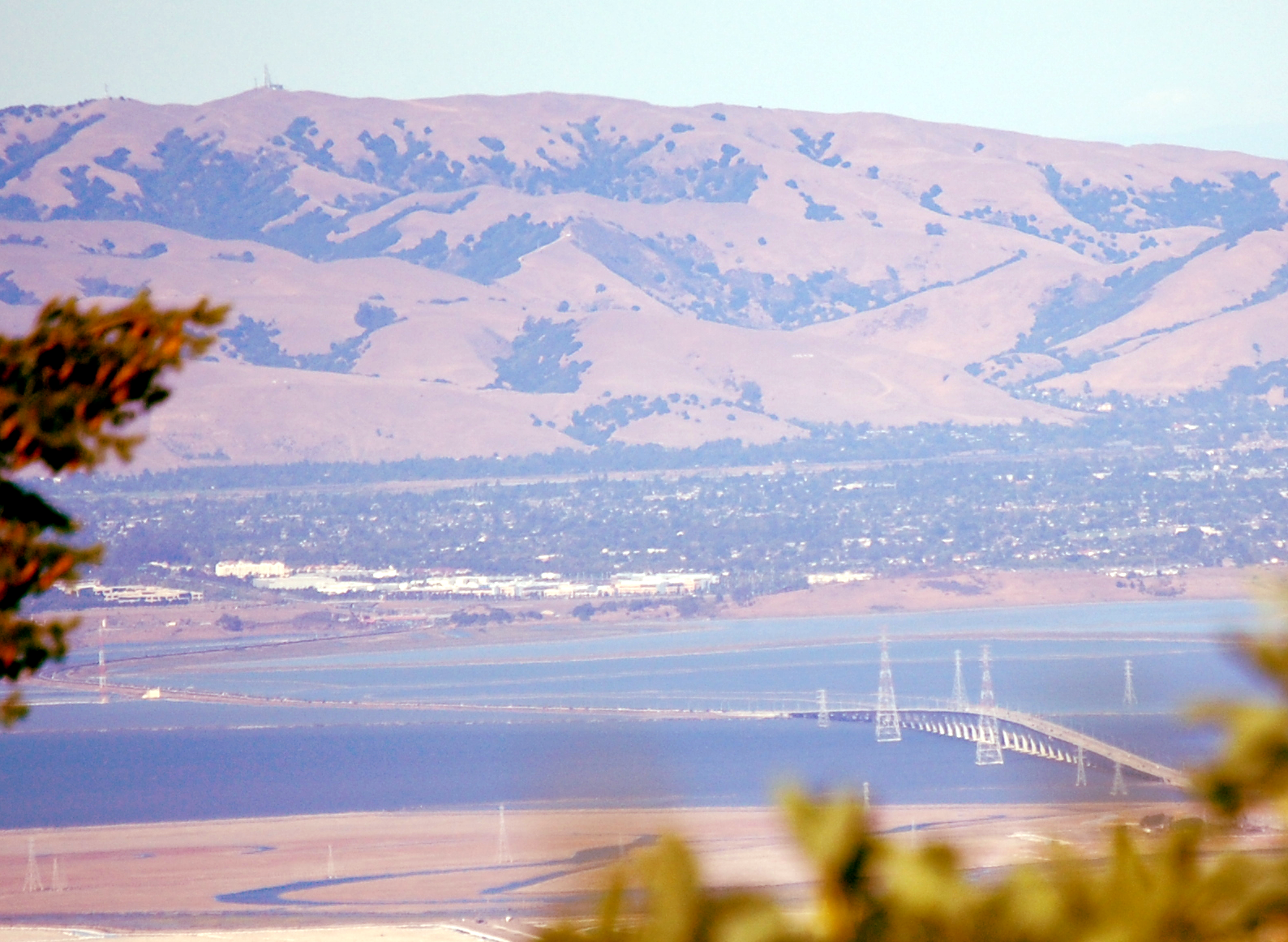
The Dumbarton Bridge as seen from Skeggs Point.

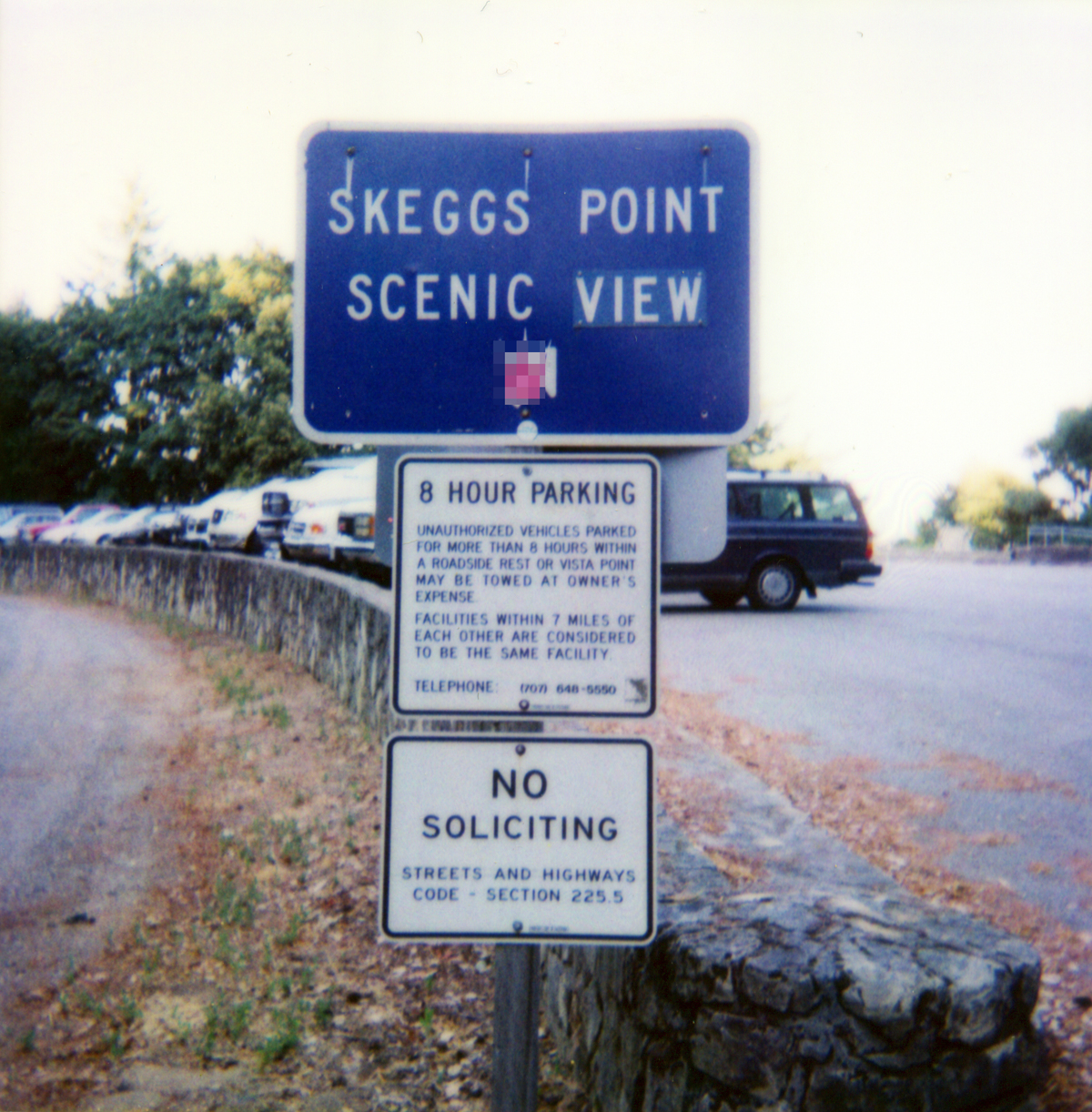

Skeggs Point is a scenic turnout in San Mateo County along State Route 35 between Kings Mountain and State Route 84. The feature is marked with a guide sign along the road and is listed on the USGS 7.5 minute quadrangle, "Woodside, California" as well as in the National Geographic Names Database. The area is about three miles (five kilometers) west and 2,000 feet (600 m) above the town of Woodside.

If not for the vegetation, there would be a panoramic view of the San Francisco Bay south of Candlestick Park, (a.k.a. Monster Park, 3Com Park) (Candlestick Park was demolished in 2015). Skeggs Point is about 2,300 feet (700 m) above mean sea level, (AMSL). NAD83 coordinates for the location are 37°24′39″N 122°18′20″W. The USGS shows a benchmark of 2,315 ft (706 m) at the vista point.

A peak named Sierra Morena (elevation 2,417 ft or 737 m) is a prominent local feature about 100 feet (30 m) west of the Skeggs Point turn-out. One of the highest points in San Mateo County (according to U.S. Geological Survey maps), Sierra Morena is closed to the public because of communication antennas and microwave equipment. Land along the roadway is largely owned by a Special District, the Midpeninsula Regional Open Space District.

== Named for Caltrans District 4 engineer ==
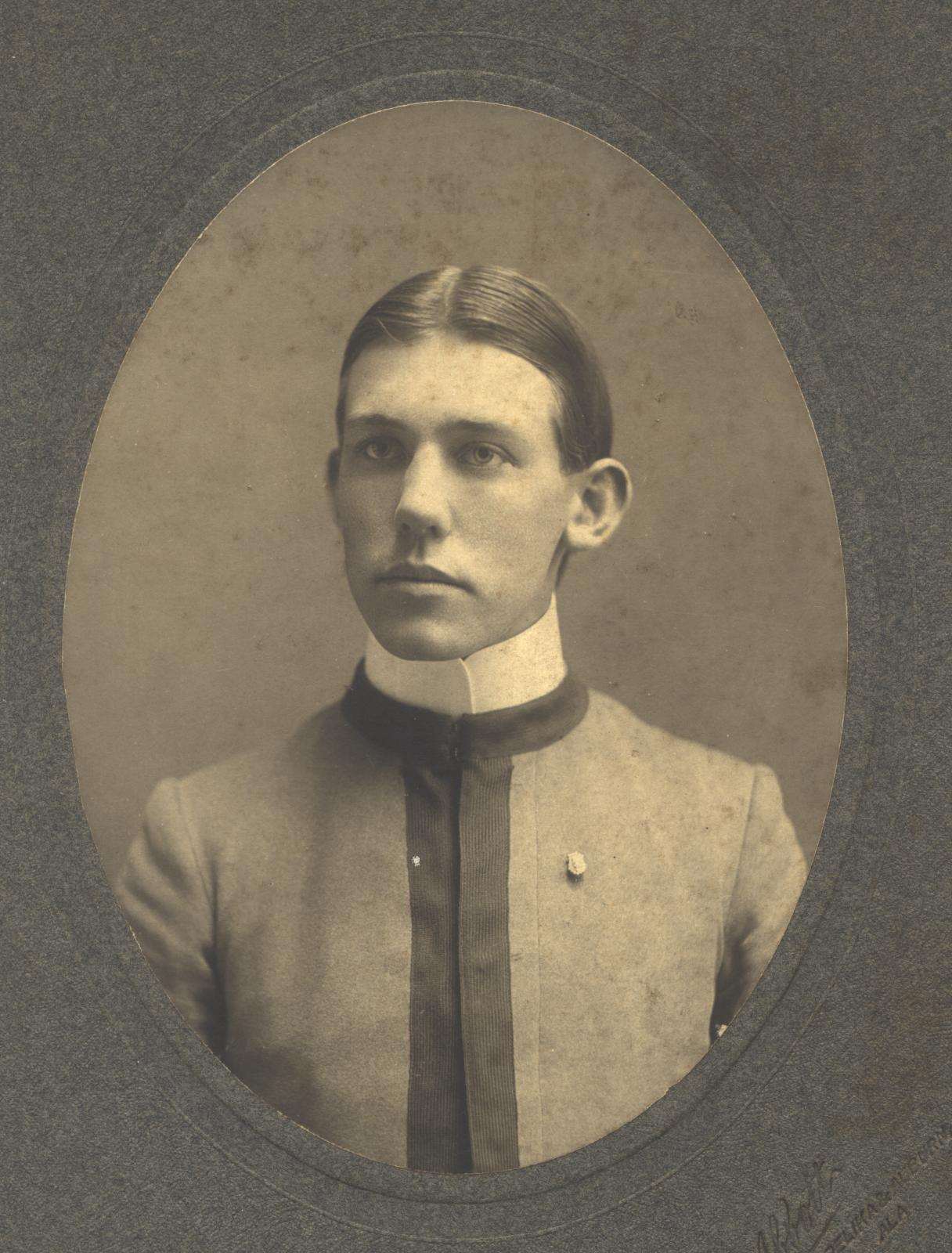
Possible portrait of Colonel Skeggs in his Alabama Polytechnic Institute (now Auburn University) uniform, circa 1901.

The geographic feature was named for Colonel John Hunt Skeggs, (US Army ret.), who served in World War I. On returning from the war, he worked as California Department of Transportation (Caltrans) District 4 engineer from roughly 1919 until his retirement in 1952. Skeggs was a high-profile factor in early Caltrans District 4 project work building US 101, SR 35, SR 152 through Pacheco Pass, the Waldo Tunnel, the Altamont Pass (then US 50 and now part of I-580), as well as a pre-1952 El Camino Real widening project. Before the war, he worked for the City of Los Angeles Department of Water and Power, (DWP).

Col. Skeggs died 28 August 1959 in Santa Clara, California.

== In popular culture ==
In Neil Young's autobiography, Waging Heavy Peace: A Hippie Dream, he describes writing "Like a Hurricane" at Skeggs Point Scenic Lookout in the back of a 1950 DeSoto Suburban.

== Sources ==
- Beal, Richard, Highway 17: The Road to Santa Cruz, (Aptos, Calif.: Pacific Group, 1991).
- Woodside, California, 7.5 minute Quadrangle, US Geological Survey, 1997.
- AncestryLibrary.com (death record information).
- Photo courtesy of Auburn University.
