= Group W =

Group W may refer to:

- Group W, Westinghouse Broadcasting
- Group W, people being considered for moral waiver by American military
  - The Group W bench from "Alice's Restaurant" by Arlo Guthrie is a reference to moral waiver
