= Alice Brock =

American artist, author and restaurateur (1941–2024)

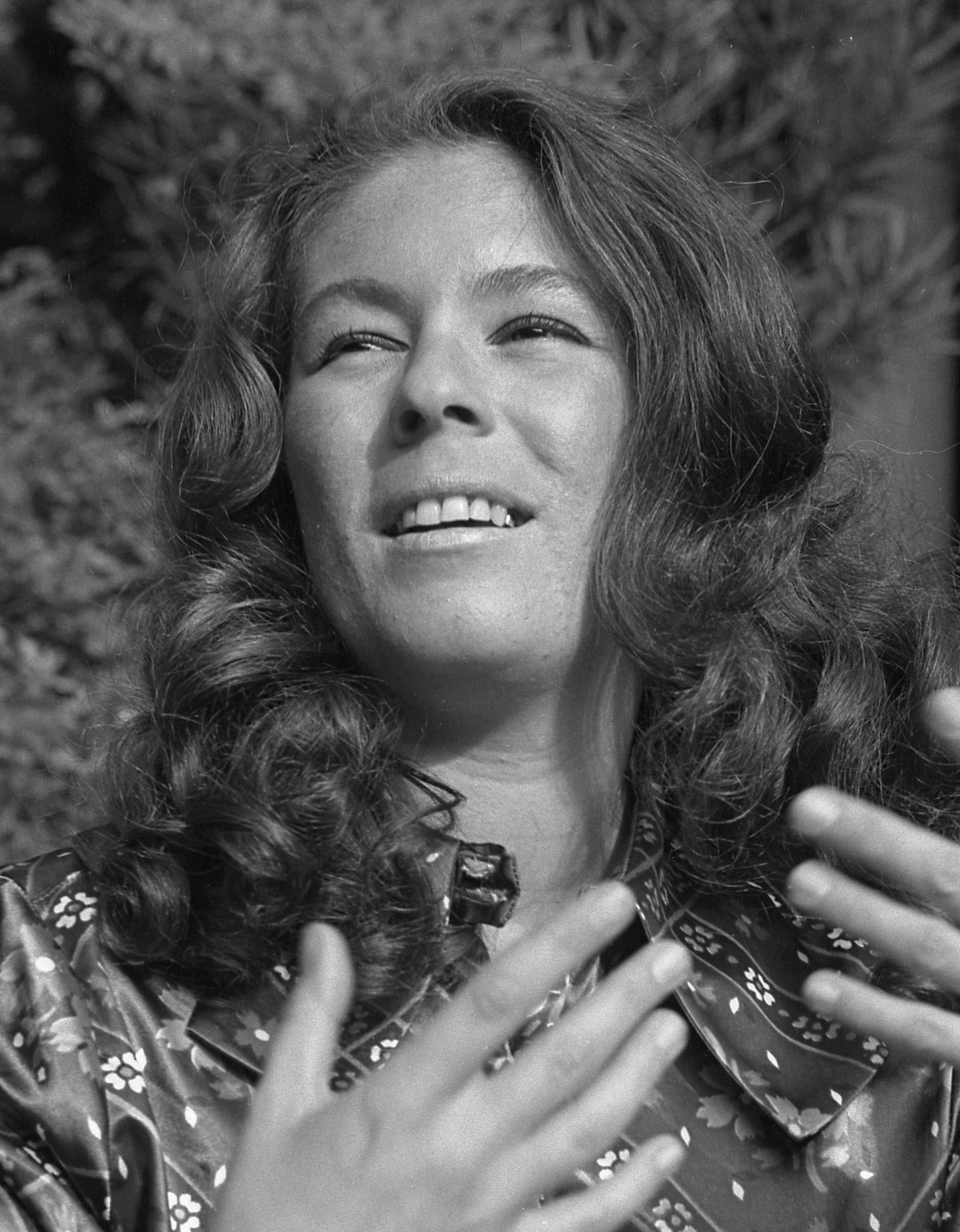
- Brock in 1969
- Born: Alice May Pelkey; February 28, 1941; Brooklyn, New York, US
- Died: November 21, 2024 (aged 83); Wellfleet, Massachusetts, US
- Years active: 1964-1991 (cooking career); 1979-2016 (art career)
- Known for: Alice's Restaurant Massacree
- Notable work: The Alice's Restaurant Cookbook
- Movement: 1960s counterculture
- Spouse: Ray Brock (m. 1962; div. 1968)

Alice May Brock (February 28, 1941 – November 21, 2024) was an American artist, author and restauranteur. A resident of Massachusetts for her entire adult life, Brock owned and operated three restaurants in the Berkshires—The Back Room, Take-Out Alice, and Alice's at Avaloch—in succession between 1965 and 1979. The first of these was the subject of Arlo Guthrie's 1967 song "Alice's Restaurant", which in turn inspired the 1969 film.

== Early life ==
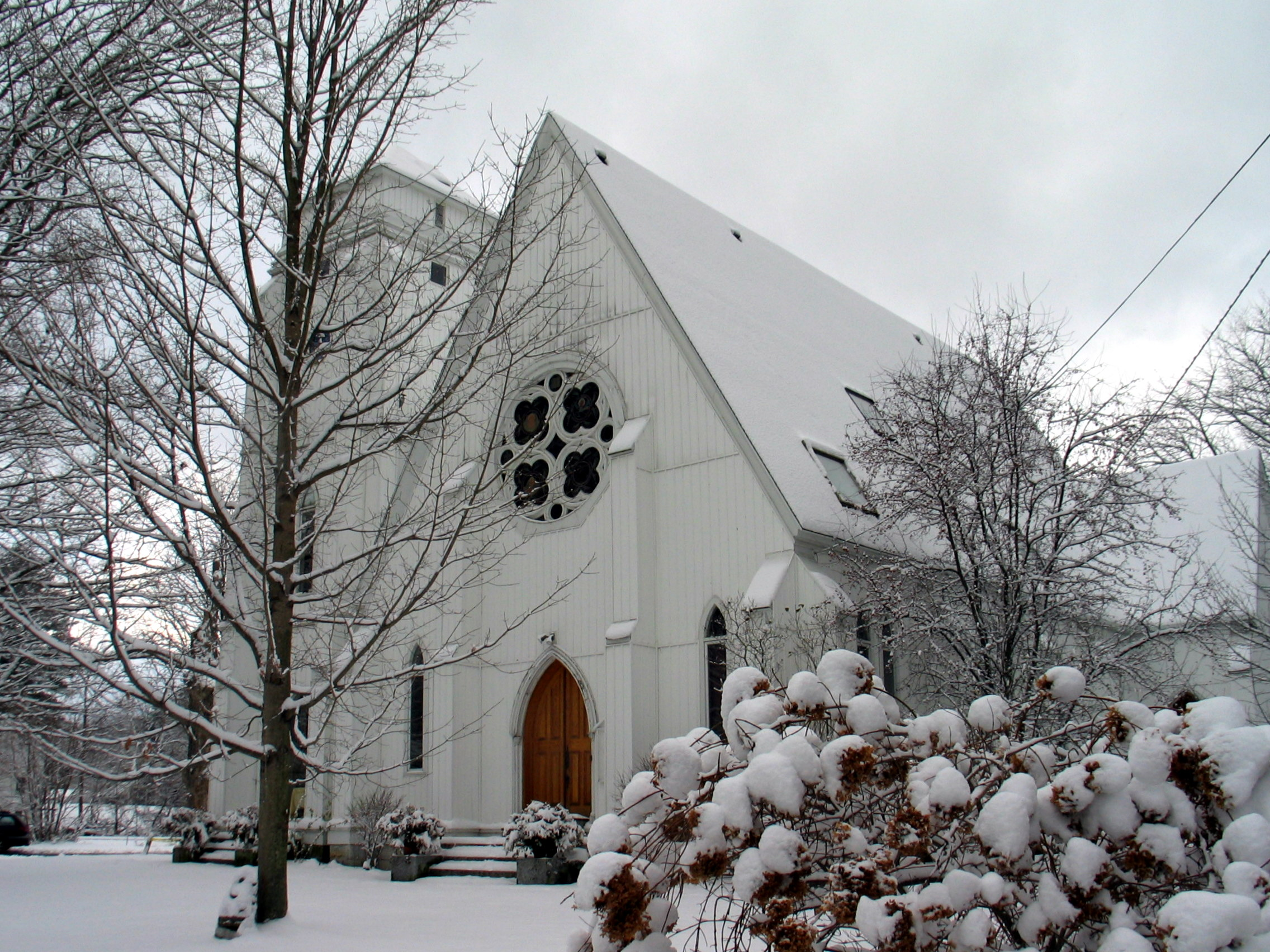
Brock lived with her husband at this former church from 1963 to 1971. Arlo Guthrie later purchased it.

Brock was born Alice May Pelkey in Brooklyn, New York City. Her mother, Mary (Dubrowski) Pelkey, was from a Jewish family in Brooklyn; her father, an Irish Catholic, was originally from Pittsfield, Massachusetts. The Pelkey family was relatively well-to-do and often spent summers in Provincetown, Massachusetts, where Mr. Pelkey sold artwork for Peter Hunt. Neither of her parents were religious, but her family had many connections to Jewish culture and she herself variously identified as a Jew and as half-Jewish. She gave mixed opinions about her early life and parents, crediting her mother for a love of cooking and her father with encouraging her love of art and taking her out to new restaurants regularly as a child, while suggesting that her parents were not "good parents" and that her father was "a bully," reasoning that her attachment to them was born more out of a people pleasing desire than familial love. She admitted being a difficult child who had never in her life been able to submit to authority, and continued to acknowledge a "mean and opinionated" side to herself well into adulthood. After a stint in reform school, she graduated from the public high school in White Plains, New York. She attended Sarah Lawrence College. By her teen years, she had taken an interest in left-wing politics, and was registered with the Socialist Workers Party along with membership in the Students for a Democratic Society (as a founding member of that organization) and Fair Play for Cuba Committee. She dropped out of college after her sophomore year.

After leaving college, she spent a short period of time in Greenwich Village, where in 1960 she met, then married in 1962, Ray Brock, a woodworker from Hartfield, Virginia who was over a decade older than Alice. Alarmed at the radicalized environment, both Ray Brock and Mary Pelkey urged Alice to leave the area, and the Brocks and Pelkeys moved to her father's hometown of Pittsfield, where Ray and Alice initially lived on Mary's property. By June 1963, Mary had arranged for both to get hired at the Stockbridge School, with Ray working as a shop teacher and Alice as a librarian. With a gift from her mother, they purchased a deconsecrated church in Great Barrington, which the couple converted into a residence for themselves and a gathering place for friends and like-minded bohemians. She would later describe the choice of a church for the group as a form of sacrilege, using a symbol of tradition and established religion to further her counterculture values. In 1991, the long-neglected building was restored and transformed into The Guthrie Center at Old Trinity Church, an interfaith worship center and performance venue. During the summer of 1963, the Brocks worked at a hostel for youth in West Tisbury, Massachusetts, on Martha's Vineyard, before returning to the church in the fall for the school year and preparing the church to be livable.

=== Littering incident ===
One of the Brocks' students at the Stockbridge School had been Arlo Guthrie, at the time an aspiring forester, a half-Jewish New York transplant like Brock, and the son of then-ailing folk icon Woody Guthrie. When Arlo Guthrie left Rocky Mountain College in Montana for Thanksgiving break in November 1965, he stayed at the Brocks' residence for their annual Thanksgiving dinner. The Brocks had largely only lived in a small corner of the bell tower, and thus large amounts of debris remained from the previous owners in the sanctuary that they had planned to use for the dinner; as a favor to the couple, Guthrie and his friend Richard Robbins agreed to dispose of the debris, not realizing that the local dump was closed for the holiday. Guthrie and Robbins dumped their load over a cliff on private property. When Stockbridge chief of police William "Obie" Obanhein was made aware of the illegal dumping, he arrested Guthrie and Robbins. Brock bailed them out, and her anger at the incident nearly prompted Obanhein to arrest her as well. Brock was otherwise friendly with Obanhein, considering him "a very sweet man, and [...] a very good cop." The turning point in their relations came after they had made the film. In the end, Guthrie and Robbins were levied a small fine and picked up the garbage that weekend.

== First restaurant ==
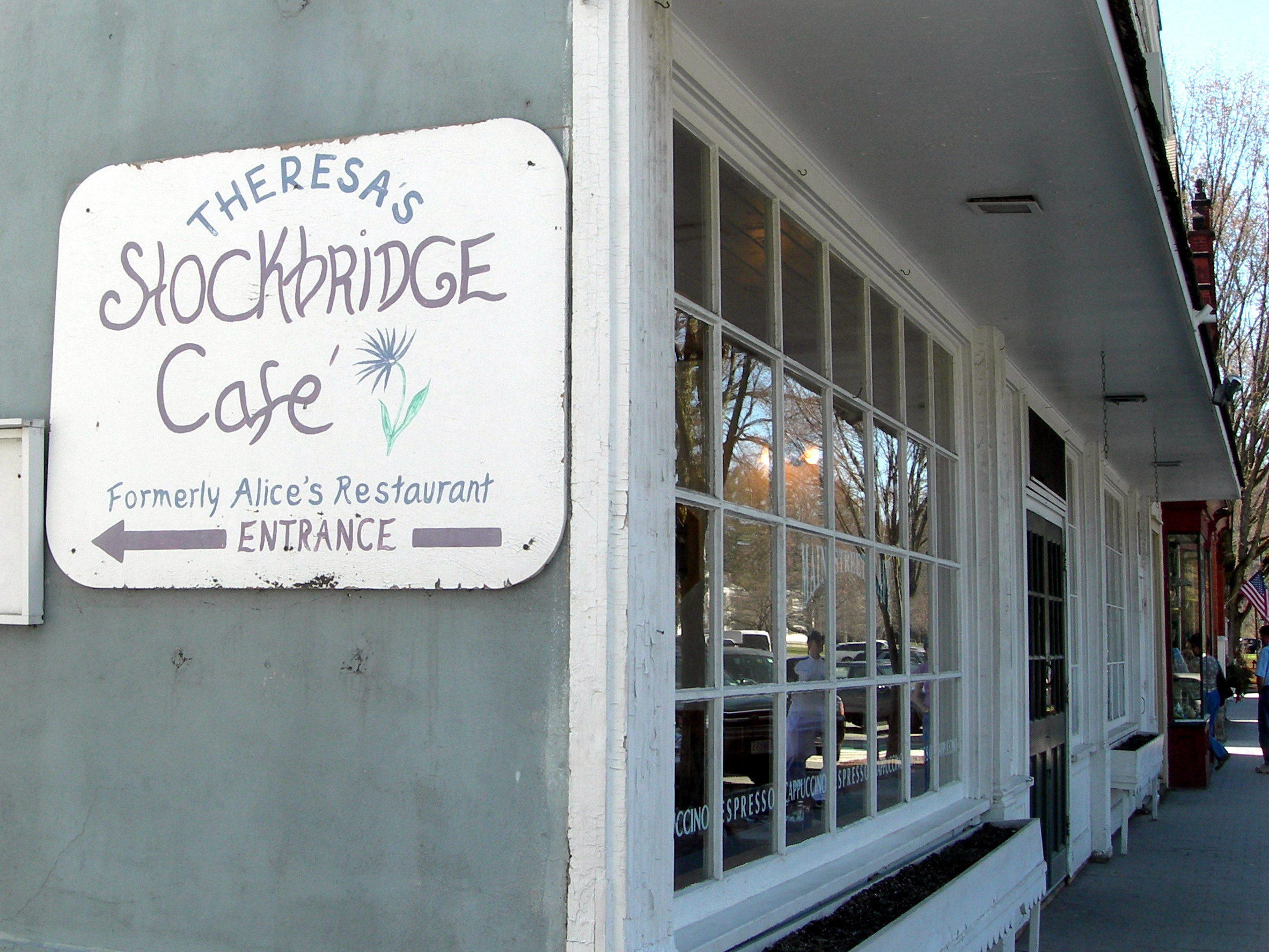
The location of Brock's first restaurant

Brock was persuaded to open a restaurant by her mother, who saw the purchase as an opportunity for her daughter to become financially independent. She had already been doing a significant amount of cooking and housekeeping for her friends at the church, which frustrated her. Alice purchased an empty business space in the back of a row of stores on US 7 in Stockbridge and converted it into The Back Room in 1965, shortly before the Guthrie visit. There is some dispute over exactly when The Back Room opened; Brock would claim in 2008 that it was not until after the littering incident, but Guthrie's song about it implies the restaurant was already open by that time. At a jam session Guthrie had with the Brocks during his visit, he, Ray and Alice began formulating the basis for what would become the first half of "Alice's Restaurant". (The second half of the song would come later.) Alice said of the finished product: "The song is great, and it's very funny. Arlo is very clever. It's a lot of fun and it has a message of all the right things: of hope and music."

Brock would reflect on this restaurant's opening as the breaking point in her marriage. According to her, because she was now living her life as an independent woman and needed her own transportation to work the restaurant, Ray no longer had financial control over her—prior to this he had only allotted her a small allowance—which increased tension between the two. Alice also admitted to not knowing much about either cooking at a professional level or business. Contrary to an implication made in the film about The Back Room, Alice says that she was faithful to Ray throughout the marriage and was not promiscuous; she did not sleep with Guthrie, for example. Guthrie also asserts that Alice was faithful to Ray in the final chorus of the song, noting a customer could "get anything you want...excepting Alice" at the restaurant, and his co-defendant, Richard Robbins, described the notion of Alice having affairs as being "complete bull."

Brock closed the restaurant in April 1966 and moved to the Boston area with friends, in addition to spending some time in Puerto Rico. She would return to Great Barrington and reconcile with Ray shortly thereafter, complete with a large hippie wedding that was written into the film, but the two would divorce permanently in 1968. According to her, Ray was "a bully, like my father." Ray returned to his home state of Virginia and died of a heart attack in 1979. There are no known remarriages or children after her divorce from Ray Brock; she commented in 2020 that she had a dim view of the nuclear family because very few of those she knew had healthy, close-knit family lives, and a statement from her caretaker upon her death implied no surviving direct next of kin, instead emphasizing Brock's "chosen family and friends." She did become a godmother to Richard Robbins's son Jesse.

== Film ==
Brock agreed to participate in the production of the film Alice's Restaurant, including taking part in promotions and making cameo appearances in the film itself; unlike Guthrie and many other figures in the story, she declined an offer to portray herself in the film, and actress Pat Quinn played the role of Alice. Brock earned almost nothing from her promotional work and was dismayed after learning that Arthur Penn, the film's director and co-writer, inserted fictional material into the story that she felt "misrepresented me, embarrassed me, and made me into an object." She objected that "I wasn't sleeping with everybody in the world, for example—and not Arlo Guthrie! And I didn't know anybody who shot heroin." Additionally, the surprise success of the song and the film made Brock an unwilling celebrity. She specifically cited the film as the source of her unwanted fame and stated in hindsight shortly after it was released that she should have done everything in her power to prevent the film from being produced. Penn, who lived in Stockbridge, had heard of the story from Brock's father, who was on the board of directors at The Berkshire Playhouse, when the song was already out. Penn and co-writer Venable Herndon finished the screenplay in 1967 and the film was released in 1969. As of June 1970, Brock was living alone in a rented house in Lenox, Massachusetts, with plans to stay there long-term.

As a way to compensate Brock, one of the film's producers arranged for her to write a cookbook, The Alice's Restaurant Cookbook, published in 1969. Brock later admitted that many of the featured recipes were created by her and her mother specifically for the book, rather than having originated at the restaurant, and had not been tested before being published; she has made it a life philosophy to frequently experiment with new recipes. The book proved to be a moderate success and went through four printings.

== Proposed restaurants ==
Brock attempted to start an Alice's Restaurant franchise in the late 1960s, but closed the first location in New York almost immediately when it failed a taste test. Brock also attempted to open another restaurant in partnership with Joan Woodruff in Lenox, Massachusetts. By June 1970, officials in Lenox had rejected the proposal, fearing that the fame behind the name would draw excessive numbers of hippies and disturb the peace. Brock—who blamed the film's portrayal of her for the town's decision while empathizing with their stance—pulled out, giving her menus and share in the proposed restaurant to Woodruff. In the meantime, Brock continued working as a caterer.

== Second restaurant ==
The proceeds from the film and book sales (which netted her $12,000, or approximately $100,000 in 2024), coupled with her decision to sell the church in 1971, freed up Brock's financial situation enough that she bought a former convenience store on Route 183 in Housatonic, Massachusetts, and converted it into Take-Out Alice, a walk-up food stand that, according to her, operated on the principle of serving "slow food, cooked fast," while maintaining some alcohol sales to maintain the site's liquor license. Take-Out Alice was considered to be Brock's best and most well-received food service operation. After battling with town officials, in 1973 she was able to install seats in the facility, which she then renamed Alice's Restaurant in an effort to capitalize on her fame.

== Third restaurant ==
As the popularity of the restaurant outgrew its location, and admittedly acting on an impulse she did not fully understand nor remember, Brock bought an estate in Lenox at a price in the hundreds of thousands of dollars, which she converted into her third and final restaurant, Alice's at Avaloch, in 1976. In contrast to her smaller, more intimate operations at the previous two restaurants, Alice's at Avaloch boasted a disco floor, swimming pool and a performance venue in addition to increased seating. By early 1978, Alice's at Avaloch was a substantial success that had made her wealthy, prompting her to display her wealth ostentatiously; an interview in The Washington Post remarked on the previously socialist Brock having suddenly turned more conservative. The location proved to be a major headache for Brock, as its infrastructure was not well-suited to an operation as large as the one she was running, at one point a severe snowstorm hit in the middle of spring, she had an admittedly "picky, petty" way of micromanaging the restaurant (continuing to make all the food from scratch even as the restaurant served hundreds of customers a day) and she again ran afoul of local town officials. As was typical of her life philosophy, she often used the restaurant for charitable purposes, offering jobs to those in need; this often backfired upon Brock, who at the time lamented the lack of work ethic her employees would often show by calling out of work for unnecessary reasons. Alice's at Avaloch went out of business a year later, she had gone into substantial debt and partnered with other investors on the venture and allowed her creditors to foreclose upon the property. The loss of the property took her by surprise and left her bankrupt. The only remaining items she kept from her time in the Berkshires were a collection of quarters from the restaurant's vending machines (which she used to rent her next apartment) and the folding table on which Guthrie had written "Alice's Restaurant". As of 2024, the former Alice's at Avaloch facility is the Apple Tree Inn.

== Retirement and death ==
Brock never intended to pursue a career in the restaurant business and expressed more interest in art. She did a few printings for an exhibition shortly before leaving the Berkshires, and all of them sold, further encouraging her to pursue it more seriously. After the closure of Alice's at Avaloch, she relocated to Provincetown, where she set up an art studio. She spent most of the 1980s as a part-time prep cook for various restaurants in Provincetown before leaving the labor force in part because of a diagnosis of emphysema in the 1990s. A chronic cigarette smoker of up to three packs a day, she visited hypnotist Yefim Shubentsov in 1991, after which she never smoked again. Smoking and alcohol dependency were Brock's two substantial vices; she was often visibly drunk during her time operating Alice's at Avaloch and would regularly down a pint of whiskey every evening during that era, commenting to The Washington Post that she never took hard drugs because "I can (dr)ink and (function normally) but I can't be stoned(.)" Beginning in the mid-1980s, Brock contributed recipes to Guthrie's periodical newsletter, the Rolling Blunder Revue.

In 2014, Brock made a one-time appearance at the Dream Away Lodge in Becket, Massachusetts, where she and other chefs inspired by her prepared some of her old recipes. Brock's personal favorite medium is rock art, a medium that she practiced most of her adult life; she was an active and early participant in the movement of painting rocks and encouraging people to hide them in unusual places to be found and relocated, what came to be known as The Kindness Rocks Project after another Cape Cod resident came up with a similar idea. Her home art gallery was located on Commercial Street overlooking Cape Cod. She continued to host a Thanksgiving dinner with her friends, either on Cape Cod or, less commonly, the Berkshires. Her 2022 dinner was hosted at the home of Richard Robbins, who had helped Guthrie dispose of Brock's garbage in 1965 and still lives in Housatonic; Guthrie visited the dinner, reuniting the three for their first Thanksgiving dinner together in 57 years. She and Guthrie had remained friends throughout the rest of her life, with the two regularly reuniting for the "occasional meal" when his schedule allowed.

In addition to the Cookbook, Brock authored two other books: her 1976 autobiography My Life as a Restaurant and a children's book, How to Massage Your Cat. She also illustrated another children's book, Mooses Come Walking, written by Arlo Guthrie.

Brock initially bristled at the fame that the song and (in particular) film had brought upon her—recalling that she had an "inherent aversion" to nostalgia and fearing that her fame had proverbially frozen her in time—but later came to appreciate her role as an icon of the 1960s. She resented how the film portrayed her yet stated that the joy people get when meeting her in person is an honor: "How can you resent that?" She recalled in 2022 feeling guilt at being upset at her association with the song after seeing how well she was respected by fans of the song: "What [...] is wrong with me? How lucky can I be?"

Brock's financial and physical health declined in the late 2010s. Declining artwork sales forced her to sell her home in 2017, after which she moved in with a friend who died shortly thereafter. Worsening chronic obstructive pulmonary disease and heart disease forced her to enter a nursing home in 2018, while an essential tremor prevented her from drawing the artwork that had been her primary source of income. Viki Merrick, a public radio producer (The Moth) and former bartender at Alice's at Avaloch, served as Brock's caretaker. Dini Lamot and other friends in the music and arts communities organized fundraisers for her so that she could afford the approximately $60,000 per year she needed to remain in Provincetown. NPR reported on Brock's medical and financial problems in a feature on Thanksgiving Day 2020, prompting $180,000 in donations. That same year, Brock recorded a custom series of introductions to "Alice's Restaurant" for stations that regularly play the song on Thanksgiving. For the remainder of her life, she resided in the West End of Provincetown. As she neared death in early November, Brock entered into discussions with Guthrie (who announced the news) and his daughter Annie to put together an exhibit on Brock's life for the Guthrie Center.

Brock died at the Lily House, a community hospice in Wellfleet, Massachusetts, on November 21, 2024, of "heart-related problems" at the age of 83.

== Other/imitator ==
The Alice's Restaurant of Sky Londa, California, has no association with Alice Brock. It was founded by Alice Taylor at the same time Brock opened up The Back Room, then converted into a tourist trap by subsequent owners capitalizing on the similarity in name (eventually adding a "Group W bench" in homage to the Guthrie song).
