= Tourist trap =

Establishment designed to attract tourists and their money

A tourist trap is an establishment (or group of establishments) created or re-purposed to attract tourists and their money. Tourist traps typically provide overpriced services, entertainment, food, souvenirs, and other products for tourists to purchase. Tourist trap derives from the information asymmetry between tourists and the market.

The term originates from Graham Greene's 1939 book The Lawless Roads describing the author's journey to Mexico. It originally referred to cheap souvenirs targeted towards tourists, but over time came to describe crowded places that tourists visit, but locals avoid.

== Mexico ==
The 1939 book The Lawless Roads was the first to use the term "tourist trap," describing the souvenirs (rather than the locations themselves) targeted at tourists who were stopping at various train stations.

[D]ifferent stations had their different tourist traps - at Apizaco, hideous little painted clubs and walking-sticks, at Rinconada little grey stone mortars for pounding corn made hideous with blue and scarlet birds’ beaks.

The same book describes Oaxaca City as a "tourist track," which matches the modern meaning of "tourist trap" as a locale that caters to tourists.

I was back where sometimes I had longed to be—on the tourist track; at any moment I expected to see my old friend from Wisconsin coming round a corner, eager to introduce me to a porter or a waitress who had looked after him. This was a city described in guidebooks where you could hire a taxi and see the sights.

== United States ==
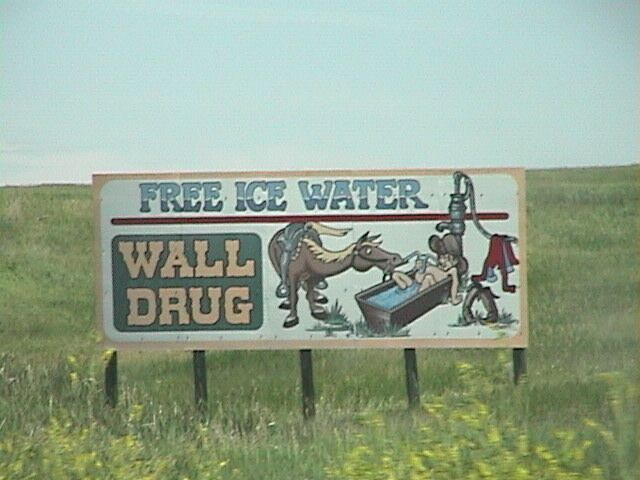
A billboard advertising Wall Drug's products

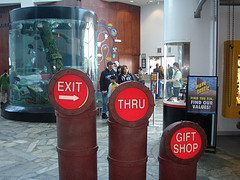
Directional signs to the gift shop and exit, Ripley's Aquarium, Myrtle Beach

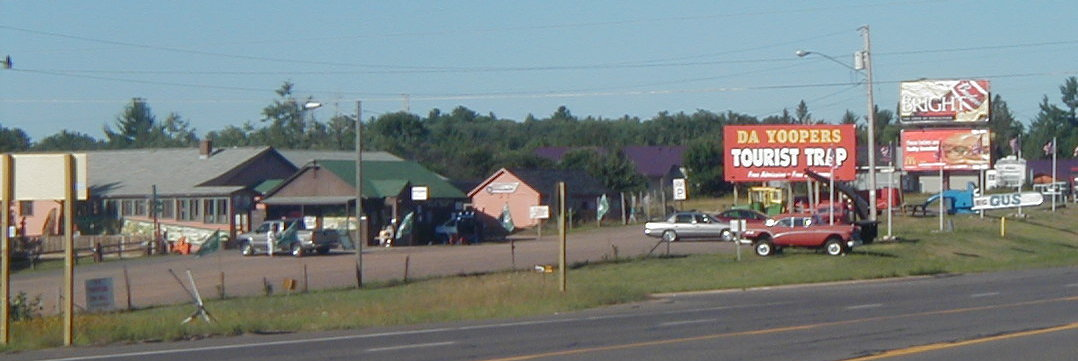
"Da Yoopers Tourist Trap" in Upper Michigan

In some areas, simple facilities may be a sufficient draw to entice tourists to stop. Wall Drug, in South Dakota, began its tourist trade by offering free ice water.

Breezewood, Pennsylvania, represents a physical tourist trap at the intersection of U.S. Route 30 Lincoln Highway Interstate 70 (Pennsylvania Turnpike) and Interstate 76, where the two major highways are not directly connected, forcing transiting drivers off the interstate and "into several suddenly urban blocks with traffic lights and a dense bazaar of gas stations, fast food restaurants and motels."

South of the Border is an attraction on Interstate 95 (I-95), US Highway 301 (US 301) and US 501 in Dillon, South Carolina, just south of Rowland, North Carolina. It is so named because it is just south of the border between North Carolina and South Carolina, and was the halfway point to Florida from New York in the early days of motor travel. The area is themed in tongue-in-cheek, faux-Mexican style. The rest area contains restaurants, gas stations, a video arcade, a motel, a truck stop as well as a small amusement park, a mini golf course, shopping and fireworks stores. Its mascot is Pedro, a caricature of a Mexican bandito. South of the Border is known for its roadside billboard advertisements, which begin many miles away, and incorporate a mileage countdown to the attraction itself. The venue is also home to a prominent motocross training facility.

Alice's Restaurant, a restaurant in Sky Londa, California, named after its founder Alice Taylor, accidentally became a tourist trap after singer Arlo Guthrie released his signature song of the same name, which was based on a totally unrelated Massachusetts restaurant established by Alice Brock. After Taylor sold the restaurant, her successors themed the restaurant after the song, adding a "Group W bench" for example, when they realized the confusion was good for business.

A few establishments take pride in the term and embody it into their names, such as "Da Yoopers Tourist Trap", run by the comedy troupe Da Yoopers in Michigan’s Upper Peninsula, and "The Tourist Trap" at Deep Creek Lake, Maryland.

== Analysis ==
Christopher Elliot writing for USA Today argues that tourist traps are desirable in urban planning to concentrate noise, trash, and crowds in areas away from residents. In remote areas such as jungles, they also ensure safety to tourists by providing water and other necessities.

In her book The New Tourist: Waking Up to the Power and Perils of Travel, author Paige McClanahan states that tourist traps are appealing to tourists because they provide "an enclave of fellow humans who, like us, are looking to explore and enjoy a new place, but who are struggling to manage the challenges and inconveniences that we've been wrestling with." Iconic tourist traps like Niagara Falls, the Eiffel Tower, and the Burj Khalifa provide tourists with a connection larger than themselves to "a sight or experience that the rest of humanity has deemed exceptional". Tourist traps also provide an escape from reality, encouragement for tourists to try new experiences, and a source of entertainment.

== See also ==
- Australia's big things
- Gift shop
- List of confidence tricks
- Lists of tourist attractions
- Overtourism
- Roadside attraction
- Tourist attraction
