= Alice's Restaurant (film) =

1969 Arthur Penn film starring Arlo Guthrie

- Theatrical release poster
- Directed by: Arthur Penn
- Screenplay by: Venable Herndon; Arthur Penn
- Based on: "Alice's Restaurant Massacree" by Arlo Guthrie
- Produced by: Hillard Elkins; Joseph Manduke
- Starring: Arlo Guthrie; Pat Quinn; James Broderick; Pete Seeger; Lee Hays; William Obanhein
- Cinematography: Michael Nebbia
- Edited by: Dede Allen
- Music by: Arlo Guthrie; Garry Sherman
- Distributed by: United Artists
- Release date: August 19, 1969 (Boston)
- Running time: 111 minutes
- Country: United States
- Language: English
- Box office: $6,100,000 (North American theatrical rentals)

Alice's Restaurant is a 1969 American biographical comedy film directed by Arthur Penn. It is an adaptation of the 1967 folk song "Alice's Restaurant Massacree", originally written and sung by Arlo Guthrie. The film stars Guthrie as himself, with Pat Quinn as Alice Brock and James Broderick as Ray Brock. Arthur Penn, who resided in the story's setting of Stockbridge, Massachusetts, co-wrote the screenplay in 1967 with Venable Herndon after hearing the song and more of the story from Brock's father, who was on the board of directors at The Berkshire Playhouse, and shortly after directing Bonnie & Clyde.

Alice's Restaurant premiered in Boston a few days after Guthrie appeared at the Woodstock Festival. A soundtrack album for the film was also released by United Artists Records. The soundtrack includes a studio version of the title song, which was originally divided into two parts (one for each album side); a 1998 CD reissue on the Rykodisc label presents this version of the song in full, and adds several bonus tracks to the original LP.

== Plot ==
In 1965, bohemian musician Arlo Guthrie has attempted to avoid the draft by attending college in Montana. His long hair and unorthodox approach to study gets him in trouble with local police as well as residents, so he quits school and hitchhikes back East. He first visits his ailing father Woody Guthrie in a New York City hospital, then performs music at various local venues.

Arlo ultimately returns to his friends Ray and Alice Brock at their home, a deconsecrated church in Great Barrington, Massachusetts, where they welcome friends and like-minded bohemian types to "crash". Among these are Arlo's school friend Roger and artist Shelly, an ex-heroin addict who is in a motorcycle racing club. Alice is starting up a restaurant in nearby Stockbridge. Arlo composes a jingle for the business, which is then advertised on a radio station, bringing in the first wave of customers. Frustrated with Ray's lackadaisical attitude, Alice has an affair with Shelly and leaves for New York to visit Arlo and Roger, who are paying Woody another visit. Ray comes to take her home, saying he has invited "a few" friends for Thanksgiving.

After Thanksgiving dinner, Arlo and Roger offer to take months' worth of garbage from Alice and Ray's house to the town dump. After loading up a red VW microbus with the garbage, plus a number of tools, they head for the dump. Finding it closed for the holiday, they drive around and discover a pile of garbage that someone else had placed at the bottom of a short cliff. They then decide to add their trash to the accumulation.

The next morning, Arlo and Roger receive a call from "Officer Obie", who asks about the garbage. After admitting to littering, they agree to pick up the garbage and meet him at the police station. Loading up the microbus with their tools, they go to the station and are immediately arrested. Arlo and Roger are driven to the "scene of the crime", where the police collect extensive forensic evidence amid a media circus. Hours later, Alice bails the boys out. At the trial the next day, Officer Obie has photos of the crime, but the judge is blind and simply levies a $25 fine, orders the boys to pick up the garbage, and sets them free. They take the garbage to New York and place it on a barge. At the church, Arlo pursues a relationship with an Asian girl, Mari-chan.

Days later, Arlo is called up for a physical examination related to Vietnam War draft at the New York City military induction center on Whitehall Street. He attempts to make himself unfit for military induction by acting like a homicidal maniac in front of a psychiatrist, but this gets him praise. Because of Guthrie's criminal record for littering, he is sent to wait with other convicts on the Group W bench. He is then pronounced unfit for military service when he comments on the dubiousness of considering littering to be a problem when selecting candidates for armed conflict, making the officials suspicious of "his kind" and prompting them to send his personal records to Washington, D.C.

Returning to the church, Arlo finds Ray and members of the motorcycle club showing home movies of a recent race. A high Shelly enters, and Ray beats him until he reveals his stash of heroin, concealed in a mobile he has made from spare car parts. Shelly roars off into the night on his motorcycle to his death. Joni Mitchell's "Songs to Aging Children Come" is sung at the funeral. The next day, Woody dies, and Arlo laments not visiting his father one last time. Ray and Alice have a hippie-style wedding and celebration in the church, and a drunken Ray proposes to sell the church and start a country commune instead while blaming himself for Shelly's death. Alice and Ray see off Arlo and Mari-chan in Arlo's microbus. Ray returns inside, while Alice silently stands on the steps and looks off into the distance.

== Cast ==
- Arlo Guthrie as himself
- Pat Quinn as Alice Brock
- James Broderick as Ray Brock
- Pete Seeger as himself
- Lee Hays as himself – reverend at evangelical meeting
- Michael McClanathan as Shelly
- Geoff Outlaw as Roger Crowther
- Tina Chen as Mari-chan
- Kathleen Dabney as Karin
- William Obanhein as himself – Officer Obie
- James Hannon as himself – the blind judge
- Seth Allen as Evangelist
- Monroe Arnold as Bluegrass
- Joseph Boley as Woody Guthrie
- Vinnette Carroll as Draft Clerk
- Sylvia Davis as Marjorie Guthrie
- Simm Landres as Private Jacob / Jake
- Eulalie Noble as Ruth
- Louis Beachner as Dean
- MacIntyre Dixon as First Deconsecration Minister
- Arthur Pierce Middleton as Second Deconsecration Minister
- Donald Marye as Funeral Director
- Shelley Plimpton as Reenie
- M. Emmet Walsh as Group W Sergeant

== Cameos and special appearances ==
The real Alice Brock makes a number of cameo appearances in the film. In the scene where Ray and friends are installing insulation, she is wearing a brown turtleneck top and has her hair pulled into a ponytail. In the Thanksgiving dinner scene, she is wearing a bright pink blouse. In the wedding scene, she is wearing a Western-style dress. She declined an offer to portray herself in the film. The real Ray and Alice appear in a black-and-white film within the film (being watched by the fictional Ray and Alice). Guthrie's real-life co-defendant Richard Robbins appears (in blue shirt, with mustache) outside Woody's hospital room right before the funeral. Robbins, at the time, was embarrassed at his involvement in the incident and refused to let his name be associated with it; the character based upon him was played by one of Robbins's personal friends.

Stockbridge police chief William Obanhein ("Officer Obie") plays himself in the film; he explained to Newsweek magazine that making himself look like a fool was preferable to having somebody else make him look like a fool. Judge James E. Hannon, who presided over the littering trial, also appears as himself in the film. Many of Guthrie's real-life associates in Stockbridge made appearances as extras, and Penn, who himself had a home in Stockbridge, spent time living among them in an effort to grasp their lifestyle. Guthrie and all of the extras were housed at the same hotel during filming of scenes outside Stockbridge, but Guthrie received star treatment; a limousine was provided for Guthrie each morning while the others had to find their own transportation for filming. This strained the relations between Guthrie and his friends for many years. Much of the film was recorded in Stockbridge.

The film also features the first credited film appearance of character actor M. Emmet Walsh, playing the Group W sergeant. (Walsh had previously appeared as an uncredited extra in Midnight Cowboy, released three months prior.) The film also features cameo appearances by American folksingers/songwriters Lee Hays (playing a reverend at an evangelical meeting) and Pete Seeger (playing himself).

== Differences from real life ==
The original song "Alice's Restaurant Massacree" that formed the basis for the film's central plotline was, for the most part, a true story. However, other than this and the hippie wedding at the end of the film, most of the other events and characters in the film were fictional creations of the screenplay's writers. According to Guthrie on the DVD's audio commentary, the film used the names of real people but took numerous liberties with actual events. Richard Robbins, Guthrie's co-defendant in real life, was replaced by the fictional Roger Crowther for the film (in the song, he remained anonymous); Robbins later described almost all the additions to the story as "all fiction" and "complete bull." He estimated that the film contained approximately "15 minutes of truth" in its entire running time. The subplots involving the Shelly character were completely fictional and not based on any real people or incidents in Guthrie's life; his character's motorcycle club was loosely based on the Trinity Motorcycle Club (or, by a conflicting account, the Triangle Motorcycle Club), a real-life group of motorcyclists that associated with the Brocks and were alluded to in another Guthrie song, the "Motorcycle Song". Mari-chan was also a fictional creation; Guthrie's girlfriend in the mid-1960s was English. The film also has Guthrie being forced to leave a Montana town after "creating a disturbance" – i.e., several town residents object to Guthrie's long hair and gang up to throw him through a plate glass window. This never happened, and Guthrie expresses regret that Montana got a "bad rap" in the film. In reality, during the time of the littering incident and trial, Guthrie was still enrolled in a Montana college, and was only in Stockbridge for the long Thanksgiving weekend (he would drop out of college at the end of the semester).

Alice Brock spoke very negatively of the film's portrayal of her. She stated in a 2014 interview, "That wasn't me. That was someone else's idea of me." She took particular offense at the film implying that she had slept with Guthrie (among others) and denied ever associating with heroin users; Brock, though she was a chronic smoker and drinker, was firmly against the use of hard drugs because they impaired her ability to work. She also noted that the film in particular had brought a large amount of unwanted publicity: "It just really impinged on your privacy. It's just amazing how brazen people can be when you're a supposed public figure (...) We sold the church at that point." In a 1970 interview, she expressed regret over the film, stating that she should have fought to stop the film from being released.

In 2023, Guthrie admitted that he thought the film was "frankly, garbage" and "a terrible movie;" he walked out of the premiere screening, believing that Penn and Herndon drew the totally wrong message from the material and that, contrary to the nihilistic mood of the film, Guthrie's generation had indeed made a major difference. "Those values are not sixties values; they're eternal values." Brock held similar sentiments in late 2022, noting that they may not have been successful in all of the things they had tried to change but had managed to accomplish much good in their lifetimes. In a 2025 reflection, Guthrie credited Penn with accurately capturing the "depressing" mood of the era and that it had "held up well."

== Reception ==
The film has a 63% rating on Rotten Tomatoes based on 19 reviews, with a weighted average of 6.19/10. In 2009, Politics Daily wrote that, "calling the 1969 film a comedy misses its noir backbeat of betrayed romanticism, and thinking of it as a madcap autobiography misses its politics. This is a movie driven by the military draft and the Vietnam War".

Upon its initial release, Newsweek called the film "the best of a number of remarkable new films which seem to question many of the traditional assumptions of establishment America."

When interviewed in 1971, the film's director, Arthur Penn, said of the film: "What I tried to deal with is the US's silence and how we can best respond to that silence. ... I wanted to show that the US is a country paralyzed by fear, that people were afraid of losing all they hold dear to them. It's the new generation that's trying to save everything".

In being offered the opinion that violence is not so important in the film, Penn replied: "Alice's Restaurant is a film of potential transition because the characters know, in some way, what they are looking for. ... It's important to remember that the characters in Alice's Restaurant are middle-class whites. They aren't poor or hungry or working class. They are not in the same boat as African Americans. But they're not militants either. In this respect the church dwellers are not particularly threatening. They find it easy to live there, even if most people can't afford such a luxury. From this point of view, this film depicts a very specific social class. It's a bourgeois film".

The final scene is not of a loving couple seeing off their guests, but of Alice standing alone looking into the distance, watching the guests leave, as if knowing that her future is in fact bleak with Ray. Coincidentally, the real Alice and Ray finalized their divorce on the same day the wedding scene was filmed. Arthur Penn has said that the final scene was intended as comment on the inevitable passing of the counterculture dream: "In fact, that last image of Alice on the church steps is intended to freeze time, to say that this paradise doesn't exist any more, it can only endure in memory". Gene Siskel of the Chicago Tribune listed Alice's Restaurant as third best film of 1969.

The film earned $6,300,000 in US theatrical rentals, making it the 17th highest-grossing film of 1969.

== Awards ==
- Nominated for Academy Award for Best Director (1969) – Arthur Penn
- Nominated for Writers Guild of America Award for Best Drama Written Directly for the Screen (1970) – Venable Herndon, Arthur Penn
- Third Place – Laurel Awards – Golden Laurel for Comedy (1970)
- Nominated for British Academy of Film and Television Arts Awards – Anthony Asquith Award for Film Music (1971) – Arlo Guthrie

== See also ==
- List of American films of 1969
