= Peter Hunt (folk artist) =

American folk artist (1896–1967)

- Born: Frederick Lowe Schnitzer; 1896; East Orange, New Jersey
- Died: 1967 (aged 70–71); Cape Cod, Massachusetts
- Education: self-taught
- Known for: painting
- Movement: folk art
- Patrons: Helena Rubenstein, DuPont

Peter Hunt (born Frederick Lowe Schnitzer; 1896 in East Orange, New Jersey – 1967 in Cape Cod) was an American artist whose work is described as folk art or primitive art. He gained recognition for his art in the 1940s and 1950s when his decorated, refinished furniture was featured in magazines such as Life, House Beautiful, and Mademoiselle.

== Life and work ==
Hunt grew up in East Orange, New Jersey in a tenement house. Hunt served in World War I in France. After spending time in Greenwich Village, he moved to Provincetown, Massachusetts in the late 1920s with his parents Ma and "Pa" (Edward C.) Hunt. Pa Hunt began painting in 1929, and his naïve art oil painting Peter Hunt's Antique Shop, 1930-34 was acquired by the MOMA in 1941.

In the 1930s, Hunt expanded his business to include several storefronts and workshop space called "Peter Hunt's Peasant Village."

He painted old furniture, household items, and fabrics, decorating them with colorful peasant designs, reminiscent of Pennsylvania German and French Provincial folk art. Hearts, flowers, fruits, birds, angels, and pretty maidens and their suitors adorned hutches, cabinets, dressers, tables, chairs, stools, wooden trays, fabrics, tins, and metalware. Hunt further embellished some of those pieces with pseudo-French phrases scrawled across their surfaces.

Hunt attracted clients in Cape Cod, including wealthy and influential individuals such as Boston socialite Frances Brown Merkel and New York cosmetics entrepreneur Helena Rubinstein, who helped establish his reputation. He designed interiors and decorative elements for their summer homes.

He employed young artists to decorate pieces in his signature style, and upscale New York department stores began carrying his furniture and knickknacks. Throughout the 1930s and 1940s, Hunt’s star shone brightly. One of Hunt's employees was a salesman surnamed Pelkey, which inspired Pelkey's daughter Alice Brock to become a Provincetown artist herself—decades after her incidental brush with fame as the titular owner of Alice's Restaurant.

Peter designed the "Cape Cod Room" restaurant of Chicago's Drake Hotel in 1935, bringing Cape Cod artifacts and painting murals of the sea. He gained popularity in the 1930s and 1940s when he encouraged women to re-make furniture during the economically challenging times of the Great Depression and World War II. His Peter Hunt's Workbook was published in 1945 by Ziff-Davis Publishing Company. In the 1950s interest in the peasant style waned, and Hunt sold his Peasant Village shops and moved to Orleans, Cape Cod where he opened a shop called Peacock Alley. Peter Hunt died almost penniless in 1967.

Today Hunt's works are collectible and sell at auction for up to thousands of dollars. LaGina Austin, an American folk art specialist, described as work as "folksy and attractive to kitschy almost corny." To recognize a Hunt original, collectors should luck for his rounded cursive signature "Peter Hunt" or "anno Domini" with the year. He always used bright colors in styles that looked like European and Pennsylvania Dutch folk art.

== Works ==
- How to Transform Outdated Furniture, E. I. Du Pont de Nemours & Co., 1943
- Peter Hunt's Workbook with text and pictures: Complete Handbook on Decorating Old and New Furniture, Ziff-Davis Publishing Company, 1945 Peter Hunt's Workbook
- Peter Hunt's How-to-do-it Book, Prentice-Hall, Inc., 1952 Peter Hunt's How-to-do-it Book
- Peter Hunt's Cape Cod Cookbook: A Cape Cod Treasury of Favorite Recipes Illustrated by the Author, Hawthorn Books, Inc., 1954

Articles

- Cape Cod Compass, 1963, "Winter is Best"
- Design, November, 1950, "Peter Hunt’s Painting Magic"
