= Joël Henry =

Joël Henry may refer to:

- Joël Henry (journalist) (born 1955), French journalist
- Joël Henry (footballer) (1962–2026), French footballer
