= William Obanhein =

United States police officer and cultural figure (1924–1994)

William J. Obanhein
- Born: October 19, 1924
- Died: September 11, 1994 (aged 69)
- Other name: Officer Obie
- Citizenship: American
- Occupation: police officer
- Years active: 1951-1985
- Employer: Stockbridge police department
- Known for: mention in Arlo Guthrie’s song “Alice's Restaurant” and role in the subsequent film, and for appearing in Norman Rockwell paintings
- Spouse: Dorothy Anderson
- Children: 4

William J. Obanhein (October 19, 1924 – September 11, 1994), also known as Officer Obie, was the chief of police for the town of Stockbridge, Massachusetts, United States. He was a member of the police force there for 34 years, 1951 to 1985. He is fairly well known for his appearances in popular culture.

Obanhein was the "Officer Obie" mentioned in Arlo Guthrie's 1967 talking blues song "Alice's Restaurant". Obanhein later said that some of the details in the song were not completely true; he said he had not handcuffed Guthrie during the arrest and said they removed the seat from the toilet in Guthrie's cell to prevent theft and vandalism, not suicide. Obanhein later would note that he would not have arrested Guthrie had the amount of garbage been smaller (he would have picked up the garbage himself) and that he meant to use the arrest and subsequent media circus as an example to deter any further large-scale littering incidents.

Obanhein accepted an offer from another Stockbridge resident, Arthur Penn, to appear as himself in the 1969 film adaptation of Alice's Restaurant Penn was directing and co-writing. Obanhein told Newsweek magazine (September 29, 1969, where his photo appears) that making himself look like a fool was preferable to having somebody else make him look like a fool. Working on the film caused Obanhein to develop greater respect for Guthrie, and afterward, the two remained friends for the rest of Obanhein's life.

Obanhein posed for Norman Rockwell (himself a resident of Stockbridge) for a handful of sketches, including the 1959 black-and-white sketch Policeman with Boys, which was used in nationwide advertisements for Massachusetts Mutual Life Insurance Company (MassMutual). He was also one of the models in Rockwell's iconic The Problem We All Live With, though his face is not seen. Obanhein also served as a model for Rockwell's illustration of the inauguration of John F. Kennedy for a 1961 cover of The Saturday Evening Post. He is sometimes mistaken (including on Guthrie's website) for the officer who posed for Rockwell's painting The Runaway, which appeared on a 1958 cover of The Saturday Evening Post; this was not Obanhein but Massachusetts state trooper Richard Clemens, and the painting was instead set at Joe's Diner in Lee, Massachusetts, not in Stockbridge.

== Personal life ==
Obanhein was married to Dorothy Anderson; they had four children. Obanhein died September 11, 1994, apparently from a heart attack at the age of 69.
