= The Lawless Roads =

1939 travel account by Graham Greene

- First edition
- Author: Graham Greene
- Language: English
- Publisher: Longmans
- Publication date: 1939
- Publication place: United Kingdom
- Media type: Print (Hardback & Paperback)
- OCLC: 41953106

The Lawless Roads (1939) (published as Another Mexico in the United States) is a travel account by Graham Greene, based on his 1938 trip to Mexico, to see the effects of the government's campaign of forced anti-Catholic secularization and how the inhabitants had reacted to the brutal anti-clerical purges of President Plutarco Elías Calles via the uprisings known as the Cristero War.

A Catholic himself, Greene travels to Mexico to see what the effects of the conflict on Catholicism there had been. His journey takes him from the northern border towns, then to San Luis Potosí, where he manages to get an audience with General Saturnino Cedillo, an agrarian warlord who had played a significant role in the conflict. He later travels to the more cosmopolitan urban environment of Mexico City, and then into the rural states of Puebla and Chiapas. His main interest was in Tabasco, home of the atheist activist and cacique of the state, Tomás Garrido Canabal.

In addition to this book, the voyage inspired Greene's novel The Power and the Glory.

The term "tourist trap" was coined by Greene in this book, referring originally not to places, but to cheaply made souvenirs aimed at American and European visitors and sold at train stations.

== Context ==
- Calles Law
- Cristero War
