= Joël Henry (journalist) =

French journalist (born 1955)

Joël Henry (born 1955) is a French journalist who was born in Strasbourg.

== Career ==
Henry founded ‘Latourex’ in 1990, which is an abbreviation of the French phrase for ‘Laboratory of Experimental Travel’.

He also co-authored The Lonely Planet Guide to Experimental Travel, published in 2005, along with Rachael Antony. The book consisted of 40 alternative methods of taking a holiday, which included:

- Organising a backpacking expedition to K2, the grid location on a map of one's locality
- Secretly following a close friend or family member on holiday and photographing their activities while wearing a cliché detective's trench coat
- Spending 24 hours in an airport lobby not intending to fly anywhere
- Traveling to a city separately to one's partner or spouse and attempting to find each other without contact or travel information
- Going to well known tourist destinations and photographing what is opposite the famous landmark

== Philosophy ==
In a similar fashion to the Oulipo group, the imposition of arbitrary restrictions serves to heighten the tourist experience. What is more, Henry appears to be concerned that the majority of foreigners in another country do exactly the same as each other, and that discovering another country is more than a mere observation of its landmarks; indeed visiting tourist traps may be the worst way to discover a country, as here one will find the fewest locals, least tradition and minimal authenticity.

== See also ==
- Lonely Planet
