= Pat Quinn (American actress) =

American actress

- Born: Langhorne, Pennsylvania, U. S.
- Occupation: Actress
- Spouse: Tommy Leonetti
- Children: 2

Patricia Quinn is an American actress.

== Biography ==
Quinn was born in Langhorne, Pennsylvania, and grew up in Panama, where her father was employed. In her early acting performances she went by Ariane Quinn to avoid confusion with an actress from Britain named Patricia Quinn.

In 1966, Quinn played the female lead as Cora Ellis, a Quaker who falls in love with Thad (Roger Ewing) in "Quaker Girl" (S12E12) on the TV Western Gunsmoke (credited as Ariane Quinn).

Quinn played the title role of Alice Brock in the 1969 film Alice's Restaurant, which the real Alice Brock disowned after its release. After the success of Alice's Restaurant, Quinn indicated she wanted to be known as 'Patricia Quinn'. Yet the movie's producer, Arthur Penn, did not like the name Patricia and insisted she go by the name Pat, and Quinn obliged.

Quinn's other credits included An Unmarried Woman, Shoot Out, Zachariah, Clean and Sober, and Shut Yer Dirty Little Mouth!.

Quinn was married to Tommy Leonetti and John Escobar. She lives in Palmdale, California.

== Filmography ==
=== Film ===
Year	Title	Role	Notes
1966	Made in Paris	Model	Uncredited
1966	The Chase	Girl at Party	Uncredited
1969	Alice's Restaurant	Alice	
1971	Zachariah	Belle Starr	
1971	Shoot Out	Juliana Farrell	
1978	An Unmarried Woman	Sue	
1983	California Cowboys	Rosa	
1988	Clean and Sober	June	
1994	Confessions of a Hitman	Jenny	

=== Television ===
Year	Title	Role	Notes
1965	Dr. Kildare	Inez	4 episodes
1965	Burke's Law	Jasmine Delleef	Episode: "A Little Gift for Cairo"
1966	Gunsmoke	Cora Ellis / Amy Boyle	2 episodes (credited as Ariane Quinn)
1968	Judd, for the Defense	Suzanne Groot	Episode: "My Client, the Fool"
1969	Then Came Bronson	Pat MacLeod	Episode: "Two Percent of Nothing"
1969	Medical Center	Dr. Katherine Kenter	Episode: "The Adversaries"
1970	Mannix	Dana Simmons	Episode: "Sunburst"
1972	Invitation to a March	Camilla Jablonski	Television film
1973	Isn't It Shocking?	Ma Tate	Television film
1974	Banacek	Charlotte Malloy	Episode: "Fly Me- If You Can Find Me"
1974	Movin' On	Sally Danielson	Episode: "Games"
1974, 1976	The Waltons	Wilma Turner	2 episodes
1977	McCloud	Eileen Mitchell	Episode: "The Great Taxicab Stampede"
