= The Power and the Glory =

1940 novel by Graham Greene

- First edition
- Author: Graham Greene
- Language: English
- Publisher: Heinemann
- Publication date: 1940
- Publication place: United Kingdom
- Media type: Print (hardback and paperback)
- Pages: 216

The Power and the Glory is a 1940 novel by British author Graham Greene. The title is an allusion to the doxology often recited at the end of the Lord's Prayer: "For thine is the kingdom, the power, and the glory, forever and ever, amen." It was initially published in the United States under the title The Labyrinthine Ways.

Greene's novel tells the story of a renegade Catholic 'whisky priest' (a term coined by Greene) living in the Mexican state of Tabasco in the 1930s, a time when the Mexican government was attempting to suppress the Catholic Church. That suppression had resulted in the Cristero War (1926–1929), so named for its Catholic combatants' slogan "Viva Cristo Rey" ("Long live Christ the King").

In 1941, the novel received the Hawthornden Prize, a British literary award. In 2005, it was chosen by TIME magazine as one of the hundred best English-language novels since 1923.

== Plot ==
During the period of intense anti-clerical government policies in Mexico, the state of Tabasco enforces a ban on Catholicism rigorously, while many other states follow a don't-ask-don't-tell policy. But in Radical Socialist Tabasco, priests have been settled by the state with wives (breaking celibacy) and pensions in exchange for their renouncing the faith and being strictly banned from fulfilling pastoral functions. Those who refuse are on the run and liable to be shot.

A scene-setting introduction to some of the characters, who are enduring a barely satisfactory existence in the provincial capital, now gives way to the story of the novel's protagonist: a fugitive priest returned after years to the small country town that was formerly his parish. The narrative then follows him on his journey through the state, where he tries to minister to the marginalised people as best he can. In doing so, he is faced with many problems, not least of which is that Tabasco is also prohibitionist, with the unspoken prime objective to hinder celebration of the Sacrifice of the Mass, for which actual wine is an essential. Otherwise it is fairly easy to obtain beer or hard liquor, despite their being forbidden.

The unnamed "traitor to the state" is a 'whisky priest' who, among his other personal failings, had fathered a child in his parish some years before. Now he meets his daughter during a brief stay, but is unable to feel repentance. Rather, he feels a deep love for the evil-looking and awkward little girl and decides to do everything in his power to save her from damnation. His chief antagonist is the police lieutenant, who is morally irreproachable but unbending in outlook. While he is supposedly "living for the people", he puts into practice a plan of taking hostages from villages and shooting them if he discovers the priest has sojourned there without being denounced. On account of bad experiences with the church in his youth, there is a personal element in his pursuit.

For his part, the priest has remained on the run in order to serve the religious needs of the poverty-stricken agriculturists he meets, despite his deep sense of unworthiness. In order to save them from harm at the hands of the vengeful lieutenant, he now feels compelled to cross the mountainous border to the less stringent, neighbouring state. During this time, he twice encounters the lieutenant - once during a round-up in his village and then after he is imprisoned as a drunk – but is not recognised and allowed to go on his way. Near death after a perilous journey, he is rescued by the workers of the Lehrs, Protestant land-owners from the US, who nurse the priest back to health and help him make plans to reach the local capital.

As he sets out, the priest meets again a mestizo whom he has earlier learned to mistrust and who eventually reveals himself to be a Judas figure. The mestizo persuades the priest to return to hear the confession of a dying man just over the border, an American gunman who is the lieutenant's second target. Though suspecting that it is a trap, the priest feels compelled to fulfil his sacramental duty. Urged by the dying man to escape and save himself, the priest falls into the hands of the waiting lieutenant nevertheless. Though the lieutenant admits that he has nothing against the priest as a man, and rather admires him, the lieutenant persists that he must be shot "as a danger". On the eve of the execution, the lieutenant shows mercy and attempts to enlist the renegade Padre José to hear the condemned man's confession (which in extremis the Church would allow), but the effort is thwarted by Padre José's domineering wife.

The lieutenant is now convinced that he has "cleared the province of priests", but in the final chapter another covert priest arrives in the capital. A faithful Catholic woman, who has previously figured as reading pious tracts about the lives of native saints to her children, has added the protagonist to her repertoire of Christian martyrs and now agrees to harbour this new arrival.

== Secondary characters ==
- Maria: The mother of Brigitta, the priest's daughter.
- Brigitta: Maria's illegitimate daughter.
- Padre José: A despised priest who obeyed the government's instructions and took a wife.
- Mr. Tench: A dissatisfied English dentist who cannot return home because devaluation of the peso affects his savings.
- Captain Fellows: The English owner of a banana plantation in whose barn the priest takes refuge.
- Mrs. Fellows: The valetudinarian wife of Captain Fellows.
- Coral Fellows: The thirteen-year-old daughter of Captain and Mrs. Fellows.
- The Chief of Police: The lieutenant's inefficient superior, mostly concerned with playing billiards and assuaging his toothache.

== Composition ==
Greene visited Mexico from January to May 1938 to research and write a nonfiction account of the persecution of the Catholic Church in Mexico, that he had been planning since 1936. (Note: It is sometimes claimed that Greene fled England in 1938 to escape a lawsuit that 20th Century Fox brought against him for a review he wrote of the Shirley Temple movie Wee Willie Winkie in Night and Day magazine. Greene's friend, the Brazilian-born film director Alberto Cavalcanti, wrote: "Graham was warned that the Americans producing the film had introduced a writ of libel against him, meaning that not only would the backers of Night and Day pay a large fine, but he, Graham himself, faced a prison sentence. The only solution was to find a country without extradition. They chose Mexico and our poor Graham went away very quickly indeed. Very likely Shirley Temple never learned that it was partly thanks to her that, during his exile, Graham Greene wrote one of his best books." Others have noted that the trip had been planned long before the review appeared, Greene paid UK£600 to settle the suit, and was never threatened with imprisonment.) The persecution of the Catholic Church was especially severe in the province of Tabasco, under anti-clerical governor Tomás Garrido Canabal. His campaign succeeded in closing all the churches in the state. It forced the priests to marry and give up their soutanes. Greene called it the "fiercest persecution of religion anywhere since the reign of Elizabeth." He chronicled his travels in Tabasco in The Lawless Roads, published in 1939. In that generally hostile account of his visit he wrote "That, I think, was the day I began to hate the Mexicans" and at another point described his "growing depression, almost pathological hatred ... for Mexico." Pico Iyer has marveled at how Greene's responses to what he saw could be "so dyspeptic, so loveless, so savagely self-enclosed and blind" in his nonfiction treatment of his journey, though, as another critic has noted, "nowhere in The Power and the Glory is there any indication of the testiness and revulsion" in Greene's nonfiction report. Many details reported in Greene's nonfiction treatment of his Tabasco trip appeared in the novel, from the sound of a revolver in the police chief's holster to the vultures in the sky. The principal characters of The Power and the Glory all have antecedents in The Lawless Roads, mostly as people Greene encountered directly or, in the most important instance, a legendary character that people told him about, a certain "whisky priest", a fugitive who, as Greene writes in The Lawless Roads, "existed for ten years in the forest and swamps, venturing out only at night".

Another of Greene's inspirations for his main character was the Jesuit priest Miguel Pro, who performed his priestly functions as an underground priest in Tabasco and was executed without trial in 1927 on false charges.

In 1983, Greene said that he first started to become a Christian in Tabasco, where the fidelity of the peasants "assumed such proportions that I couldn't help being profoundly moved."

Despite having visited Mexico and published an account of his travels, in the novel Greene was not meticulous about Tabasco's geography. In The Power and the Glory, he identified the region's northern border as another Mexican state and its southern border as the sea, when Tabasco's northern border is actually the Bay of Campeche and its southern border is Chiapas.

== Adaptations ==
In 1947, the novel was freely adapted into a film, The Fugitive, directed by John Ford and starring Henry Fonda as the priest. It was faithfully dramatized by Denis Cannan for performance at the Phoenix Theatre in London in 1956, the whisky priest acted by Paul Scofield, and in 1958 at the Phoenix Theatre in New York City. The dramatization was The Play of the Week on US television in 1959, with James Donald as the priest. A highly acclaimed 1961 US television version, released theatrically overseas, featured Laurence Olivier in the role.

== Criticism ==
The Power and the Glory was somewhat controversial and, in 1953, Cardinal Bernard Griffin of Westminster summoned Greene and read him a pastoral letter condemning the novel. According to Greene:

The Archbishop of Westminster read me a letter from the Holy Office condemning my novel because it was "paradoxical" and "dealt with extraordinary circumstances." The price of liberty, even within a Church, is eternal vigilance, but I wonder whether any of the totalitarian states ... would have treated me as gently when I refused to revise the book on the casuistical ground that the copyright was in the hands of my publishers. There was no public condemnation, and the affair was allowed to drop into that peaceful oblivion which the Church wisely reserves for unimportant issues.

Evelyn Waugh in Greene's defence wrote, "It was as fatuous as unjust – a vile misreading of a noble book." Greene said that when he met Pope Paul VI in 1965, he assured Greene, "some aspects of your books are certain to offend some Catholics, but you should pay no attention to that." Many novelists consider the novel to be Greene's masterpiece, as John Updike claimed in his introduction to the 1990 reprint of the novel. On its publication, William Golding claimed Greene had "captured the conscience of the twentieth century man like no other."

== See also ==
- Red Shirts (Mexico)
