= Rinconada, Veracruz =

Rinconada
- Locality
- Library in Rinconada
- Interactive map of Rinconada
- Country: Mexico
- State: Veracruz
- Municipality: Emiliano Zapata

Government
  - Federal electoral district: Veracruz's 8th
- Elevation: 255 m (837 ft)

Population (2020)
  - Total: 8,005
- Time zone: UTC-6 (Zona Centro)

Rinconada is a town in the Mexican state of Veracruz. It is part of the municipality of Emiliano Zapata.

== Demographics ==
Population census
Year	Pop.	±%
1900	373	—
1910	516	+38.3%
1921	1,077	+108.7%
1930	826	−23.3%
1940	1,265	+53.1%
1950	996	−21.3%
1960	1,607	+61.3%
1970	2,461	+53.1%
1980	4,649	+88.9%
1990	5,046	+8.5%
2000	6,545	+29.7%
2010	8,173	+24.9%
2020	8,005	−2.1%
Source: INEGI 2020
