= Sociotropy =

Excessive investment in interpersonal relationships

Sociotropy is a personality trait characterized by excessive investment in interpersonal relationships and usually studied in the field of social psychology. People with this personality trait can be known as people pleasers.

People with sociotropy tend to have a strong need for social acceptance, which causes them to be overly nurturant towards people who they do not have close relationships with. Sociotropy can be seen as the opposite of autonomy, because those with sociotropy are concerned with interpersonal relationships, whereas those with autonomy are more concerned with independence and do not care so much for others. Sociotropy has been correlated with feminine sex-role orientation in many research experiments.

Sociotropy is notable in that it interacts with interpersonal stress or traumatic experience to influence subsequent depression.

== Sociotropy-Autonomy Scale ==
The Sociotropy-Autonomy Scale (SAS) was introduced by Aaron T. Beck as a means of assessing two cognitive-personality constructs hypothesized as risk factors in depression. The scale focuses on the two personality traits of Sociotropy (social dependency) and Autonomy (satisfying independency). The development of the SAS was gathered through patient self-reports and patient records collected from therapists. Using psychometrics, from the sample of 378 psychiatric patients questions were placed into a two-factor structure where the final pool of items was 60-109. From there each 30 items generated three factors for sociotropy: Concern About Disapproval, Attachment/Concern About Separation, and Pleasing Others; and three for autonomy: Individualistic or Autonomous Achievement, Mobility/Freedom from Control of Others, and Preference for Solitude. The SAS has 60 items rated on a 5-point scale (ranging from 0 to 4). Scores are then totaled separately on each dimension. The scale has been modified since its development. The current SAS decomposes Sociotropy into two factors (neediness and connectedness). Neediness is associated with the symptoms of depression—and connectedness is a sensitivity towards others, and associated with valuing relationships.

Since the development of the SAS, many other measures of personality constructs have been developed to assess other personality traits with some overlapping with the SAS, but examining for different traits.

== Self-control ==
Sociotropic individuals react differently when faced with situations that involve self-control. Sociotropic individuals consume more food, or try to match a peer's eating habits when they believe doing so makes the peer more comfortable. This is often hypothesized as being a result of the individual attempting to achieve social approval and avoid social rejection. The social pressure and dependence can cause a loss of self-control in an individual, especially if they are unaware of their desire for social acceptance.

== Depression ==
Much research on sociotropy focuses on links between personality and the risk for depression. People who are very dependent are classified as sociotropic individuals, and are more prone to depression as they seek to sustain their low self-esteem by establishing secure interpersonal relationships. Sociotropic individuals are heavily invested into their relationships with other people and have higher desires for acceptance, support, understanding, and guidance—which is problematic when relationships fail. People who are sociotropic and going through failed relationships are likely to become depressed due to intensified feelings of abandonment and loss. Researchers have difficulty figuring out exactly how much personality affects risk for depression, as it is hard to isolate traits for research, though they conclude that a person can either be sociotropic or independent, but not both.

== Research ==
Sociotropy has been linked to other personality traits such as introversion and lack of assertion. Lack of assertion has been hypothesized to be due to the need to please others to build interpersonal relationships. Individuals who are sociotropic avoid confrontation to prevent abandonment.

Along the lines of lack of assertion there has also been research studying the connection between sociotropy and shyness. The characteristic interpersonal dependence and fear of social rejection are also attributes of shyness. Research shows that many items from the SAS relate to dimensions of dependence and preoccupations for receiving approval of others, which is problematic in interpersonal relationships for people who are shy. Individuals who are shy and sociotropic have internal conflicts to want to avoid others as well as having strong motives to approach people. The results from such research concludes that sociotropy predicts other symptoms of discomfort in assertive situations and in conversations.

Research on the subject also seems to connect a link between higher levels of anxiety and sociotropy. Putting excessive amounts of energy into dependent relationships increases anxiety. The behavioral disposition that causes an individual to depend on others for personal satisfaction can also have an effect on their anxiety levels. The research concluded that anxiety and sociotropy are positively correlated in many situations such as social evaluation, physical danger, and ambiguous situations. Sociotropy and anxiety are present in these situations because they are social by definition, and therefore associated with emphasis on social relationships that are characteristic of sociotropic individuals.
