= Arthur Penn =

American film and theatre director (1922–2010)

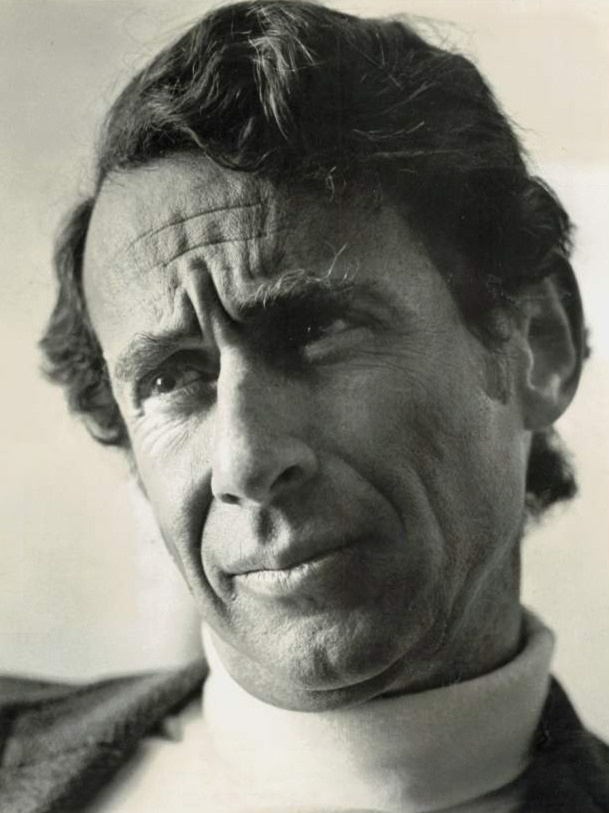
- Penn in 1972
- Born: Arthur Hiller Penn; September 27, 1922; Philadelphia, Pennsylvania, U.S.
- Died: September 28, 2010 (aged 88); New York City, New York, U.S.
- Education: Black Mountain College
- Occupations: Film director, theatre director, film producer, television producer, screenwriter
- Spouse: Peggy Maurer (m. 1955) (1931-2012)
- Children: Two, including Matthew
- Family: Irving Penn (elder brother)
- Military career
- Allegiance: United States
- Branch: United States Army
- Service years: 1943-1946
- Conflicts: World War II; Western Front; Battle of the Bulge

Arthur Hiller Penn (September 27, 1922 – September 28, 2010) was an American filmmaker, theatre director, and producer. He was a three-time Academy Award nominee for Best Director, and a Tony Award winner. Among other accolades, he was also nominated for a BAFTA Award, a Golden Globe and two Primetime Emmy Awards.

Penn first achieved prominence as a theatre director, winning a Tony Award for Best Direction of a Play for The Miracle Worker. He received similar acclaim and his first Oscar nomination for directing the 1962 film adaptation. His 1967 film Bonnie and Clyde is credited with initiating the New Hollywood movement, by infusing the biographical crime drama with a counterculture sensibility. He achieved similar critical and commercial success directing the comedy Alice's Restaurant (1969) and the revisionist Western Little Big Man (1970), which further reflected that ethos.

Penn’s other notable films included the neo-noir Night Moves (1975) and the revisionist Western The Missouri Breaks (1976). In the 1990s, he returned to stage and television direction and production, including an executive producer role for the police procedural series Law & Order.

== Early life ==
Penn was born in 1922, to a Russian Jewish family in Philadelphia, Pennsylvania, the son of Sonia (Greenberg), a nurse, and Harry (Tzvi) William Penn, a watchmaker, both natives of then Novoaleksandrovsk, Russia, now Zarasai, Lithuania. He was the younger brother of Irving Penn, the fashion, portrait and still life photographer. During his early years, he moved in with his mother after she divorced his father. Some time after, he came back to his sickly father, leading him to run his father's watch repair shop. As Penn grew up, he became increasingly interested in film, especially after seeing the Orson Welles film Citizen Kane.

At 19, he was drafted into the United States Army during World War II (1943–1946), serving as an infantryman in the Battle of the Bulge. While stationed in Britain, he became interested in theater. He started to direct and take part in shows being put on for the soldiers around England at the time.

After the war, Penn attended Black Mountain College in North Carolina. As a student there he directed a production of Erik Satie's Le piège de Méduse with R. Buckminster Fuller, Elaine de Kooning, and Merce Cunningham performing, and he was a featured commentator in the documentary Fully Awake about the college.

== Career ==
After making a name for himself as a director of quality television dramas, Penn made his feature debut with The Left Handed Gun (1958) for Warner Brothers. A retelling of the Billy the Kid legend, it was distinguished by Paul Newman's portrayal of the outlaw as a psychologically troubled youth (the role was originally intended for James Dean). The production was completed in only 23 days, but Warner Brothers reedited the film against his wishes with a new ending he disapproved of. The film failed upon release in North America, but was well received in Europe.

Penn's second film was The Miracle Worker (1962), the story of Anne Sullivan's struggle to teach the blind and deaf Helen Keller how to communicate. It garnered two Academy Awards for its leads Anne Bancroft and Patty Duke. Penn had won a Tony Award for directing the stage production, written by William Gibson, also starring Bancroft and Duke, and he had directed Bancroft's Broadway debut in playwright Gibson's first Broadway production, Two for the Seesaw.

Penn began working on The Train in France in June and August 1963 when star Burt Lancaster had Penn fired after three days of Penn's filming and called on John Frankenheimer to take over the film.

In 1965 Penn directed Mickey One. Heavily influenced by the French New Wave, it was the dreamlike story of a standup comedian (played by Warren Beatty) on the run from sinister, ambiguous forces. In 2010, Penn commented: "You know, you could not have gone through the Second World War with all that nonsense with Russia being an ally and then being the big black monster. It was an absurd time. The McCarthy period was ridiculous and humiliating, deeply humiliating. When I finally did 'Mickey One', it was in repudiation of the kind of fear that overtook free people to the point where they were telling on each other and afraid to speak out. It just astonished me, really astonished me. I mean, I was a vet, so it was nothing like what we thought we were fighting for."

Penn's next film was The Chase (1966) a thriller following events in a small corrupt Southern town on the day an escaped convict, played by Robert Redford, returns. Penn was excluded from the post-production process, which was instead overseen by producer Sam Spiegel. However, the film was still praised by critics, with Dave Kehr later calling it one of Penn's "most personal and feverishly creative works". Also that year, he directed the stage version of the thriller Wait Until Dark starring Lee Remick and Robert Duvall.

He reunited with Warren Beatty for the gangster film Bonnie and Clyde (1967). The film went on to become a worldwide phenomenon. It was strongly influenced by the French New Wave and itself went on to make a huge impression on a younger generation of filmmakers. Indeed, there was a strong resurgence in the "love on the run" subgenre in the wake of Bonnie and Clyde, peaking with Badlands (1973; in which Penn received acknowledgement in the credits). Beatty had given him 10% of the potential profits of the film before production started and the success of the film earned Penn over $2 million.

At the time he had completed Bonnie and Clyde, Penn was residing in Stockbridge, Massachusetts, when he heard a story of a large-scale littering incident that had happened in the town two years prior. He contacted Arlo Guthrie, received permission to adapt his song "Alice's Restaurant Massacree" into a film, and secured Guthrie's participation as well as several other Stockbridge town residents while filming in many of the same locations where the events took place. The film Alice's Restaurant was released in 1969. Guthrie later stated in 2023 that he was angered by the film, believing Penn and his co-writer had come to a fundamentally wrong conclusion about whether or not hippie values were still relevant, and had walked out of the film's premiere; Alice Brock and Richard Robbins, who were also portrayed in the film, were similarly offended.

Penn followed up Alice's Restaurant in 1970 with Little Big Man, a "shaggy dog" account of the life of a white man (played by Dustin Hoffman) who gets adopted into the Cheyenne tribe. In 1973 Penn provided a segment for a promotional film for the Olympics titled Visions of Eight along with several other major directors such as John Schlesinger and Miloš Forman. His next film was Night Moves (1975) about a private detective (played by Gene Hackman) on the trail of a runaway. Next came The Missouri Breaks (1976), a ramshackle, eccentric story of a horse thief (Jack Nicholson) facing off with an eccentric bounty hunter (played by Marlon Brando).

In the 1980s, Penn's career began to lose its momentum with critics and audiences. Four Friends (1981) was a traumatic look back at the 1960s. Target (1985) was a mainstream thriller reuniting the director with Gene Hackman, and Dead of Winter (1987) was a horror/thriller. Subsequently, Penn returned to work in television, including as an executive producer for the crime series Law & Order.

At the 57th Berlin International Film Festival in 2007, Penn received the Honorary Golden Bear.

Penn maintained an affiliation with Yale University, occasionally teaching classes there.

== Personal life ==
In 1955, he married actress Peggy Maurer. They had two children: son Matthew Penn and daughter, Molly Penn.

Penn became friends with Alger Hiss during the production of Mickey One, saying in a 2010 interview, "Alger got married here in my apartment. And so I became more of a student of the Hiss period than I knew what to do with, frankly".

=== Death ===
Penn died from congestive heart failure at his home in Manhattan on September 28, 2010, the day after his 88th birthday.

== Filmography ==
=== Film ===
Year	Title	Notes
1958	The Left Handed Gun	
1962	The Miracle Worker	
1965	Mickey One	
1966	The Chase	
1967	Bonnie and Clyde	
1969	Alice's Restaurant	
1970	Little Big Man	
1973	Visions of Eight	Segment: "The Highest"
1975	Night Moves	
1976	The Missouri Breaks	
1981	Four Friends	
1985	Target	
1987	Dead of Winter	
1989	Penn & Teller Get Killed	
1995	Lumière and Company	1 segment

=== Television ===
Year	Title	Notes
1953	Gulf Playhouse	7 episodes
1953–55	Goodyear Television Playhouse	6 episodes
1953–55	The Philco Television Playhouse	11 episodes
1954	Justice	Episode: "Man on the Hunt"
1954–55	Producers' Showcase	2 episodes
1955–56	Playwrights '56	7 episodes
1957–58	Playhouse 90	5 episodes
2000–01	Law & Order	Executive producer – 13 episodes
2001	100 Centre Street	Episode: "The Fix"

==== TV films and miniseries ====
Year	Title	Notes
1968	Flesh and Blood	
1993	The Portrait	
1996	Inside	

== Stage directing credits ==
Year	Title	Venue	Ref.
1956	The Lovers	Martin Beck Theatre, New York	
1958	Two for the Seesaw	Booth Theatre, New York	
1958–59	Two for the Seesaw	US tour	
1959	The Miracle Worker	New Locust Theatre, Philadelphia	
1959	The Miracle Worker	Wilbur Theatre, Boston	
1959–61	The Miracle Worker	Playhouse Theatre, New York	
1960–61	Toys in the Attic	Hudson Theatre, New York	
1960–61	An Evening with Mike Nichols and Elaine May	John Golden Theatre, New York	
1960–61	All the Way Home	Belasco Theatre, New York	
1961	The Miracle Worker	Hanna Theatre, Cleveland	
1962	In the Courting House	Biltmore Theatre, New York	
1963	Lorenzo	Plymouth Theatre, New York	
1963	My Mother, My Father and Me	Plymouth Theatre, New York	
1964–66	Golden Boy	Majestic Theatre, New York	
1966	Wait Until Dark	Ethel Barrymore Theatre, New York	
1966	Wait Until Dark	Shubert Theatre, New York	
1966	Wait Until Dark	George Abbott Theatre, New York	
1966	Wait Until Dark	Music Box Theatre, New York	
1967	How Now, Dow Jones	Shubert Theatre, New York	
1967	How Now, Dow Jones	Miller Theater, Philadelphia	
1967	How Now, Dow Jones	Emerson Colonial Theatre, Boston	
1976–78	Sly Fox	Broadhurst Theatre, New York	
1977	Golda	Morosco Theatre, New York	
1978	Sly Fox	Jacobs Music Center, San Diego	
1978	Sly Fox	Orpheum Theatre, San Francisco	
1978	Sly Fox	Blackstone Theatre, Chicago	
1978	Sly Fox	Shubert Theatre, Los Angeles	
1982	Monday After the Miracle	Eugene O'Neill Theatre, New York	
1987	Hunting Cockroaches	New York City Center, New York	
1987	Hunting Cockroaches	Mark Taper Forum, Los Angeles	
1990	One of the Guys	Public Theater, New York	
2000	Who's Afraid of Virginia Woolf?	Actors Studio, New York	
2002	Fortune's Fool	Truglia Theatre, Stamford	
2002	Fortune's Fool	Music Box Theatre, New York	
2004	Sly Fox	Ethel Barrymore Theatre, New York	

== Awards and nominations ==
Institution	Year	Category	Work	Result	Ref.
Academy Awards	1963	Best Director	The Miracle Worker	Nominated	
Academy Awards	1968	Best Director	Bonnie and Clyde	Nominated	
Academy Awards	1970	Best Director	Alice's Restaurant	Nominated	
Avoriaz Fantastic Film Festival	1987	Grand Prize	Dead of Winter	Nominated	
Bodil Awards	1968	Best English Language Film	Bonnie and Clyde	Won	
British Academy Film Awards	1968	Best Film	Bonnie and Clyde	Nominated	
Cannes Film Festival	1996	SACD Prize	Inside	Nominated	
Golden Globe Awards	1968	Best Director	Bonnie and Clyde	Nominated	
Mar del Plata International Film Festival	1968	Best Film (Critics Grand Prize)	Bonnie and Clyde	Won	
Mar del Plata International Film Festival	1968	Best Film (International Competition)	Bonnie and Clyde	Won	
Moscow International Film Festival	1971	FIPRESCI Prize (Special Mention)	Little Big Man	Won	
New York Film Critics Circle	1967	Best Director	Bonnie and Clyde	Nominated	
Primetime Emmy Awards	1958	Outstanding Directing for a Drama Series	Playhouse 90 ("The Miracle Worker")	Nominated	
Primetime Emmy Awards	2001	Outstanding Drama Series	Law & Order	Nominated	
San Sebastián International Film Festival	1962	OCIC Award	The Miracle Worker	Won	
Tony Awards	1958	Best Director	Two for the Seesaw	Nominated	
Tony Awards	1960	Best Direction of a Play	The Miracle Worker	Won	
Tony Awards	1961	Best Direction of a Play	All the Way Home	Nominated	
Valladolid International Film Festival	1968	Golden Spike	Mickey One	Nominated	
Valladolid International Film Festival	1996	Golden Spike	Inside	Nominated	
Venice Film Festival	1965	Golden Lion	Mickey One	Nominated	
Writers Guild of America	1970	Best Original Screenplay	Alice's Restaurant	Nominated	

Penn also received lifetime achievement honors from the Berlin International Film Festival, the San Francisco International Film Festival, and the Los Angeles Film Critics Association, among others.

=== List of accolades earned by Penn's films ===
Year	Title	Academy Awards		BAFTA Awards		Golden Globe Awards	
Year	Title	Nominations	Wins	Nominations	Wins	Nominations	Wins
1962	The Miracle Worker	5	2	2	1	4	1
1967	Bonnie and Clyde	10	2	4	1	7	
1969	Alice's Restaurant	1		1			
1970	Little Big Man	1		3		1	
1975	Night Moves			1			
1981	Four Friends					1	
Total		17	4	11	2	13	1

Oscar-related Performance
Under Penn's directions, these actors have received Oscar nominations and wins for their performances in these respective roles.

Year	Performer	Feature Film	Result
Academy Award for Best Actor
1968	Warren Beatty	Bonnie and Clyde	Nominated
Academy Award for Best Actress
1963	Anne Bancroft	The Miracle Worker	Won
1968	Faye Dunaway	Bonnie and Clyde	Nominated
Academy Award for Best Supporting Actor
1968	Gene Hackman	Bonnie and Clyde	Nominated
1968	Michael J. Pollard	Bonnie and Clyde	Nominated
1971	Chief Dan George	Little Big Man	Nominated
Academy Award for Best Supporting Actress
1963	Patty Duke	The Miracle Worker	Won
1968	Estelle Parsons	Bonnie and Clyde	Won

Preceded by Frank Corsaro	Artistic Director of the Actors Studio; 1995–1998	Succeeded by Estelle Parsons
