= Alice's Restaurant =

1967 song by Arlo Guthrie

"Alice's Restaurant Massacree"

Song by Arlo Guthrie

from the album Alice's Restaurant
- Released: October 1967
- Recorded: 1967
- Genre: Talking blues; folk rock
- Length: 18:34
- Label: Warner Bros.
- Songwriter: Arlo Guthrie
- Producer: Fred Hellerman

Audio
- "Alice's Restaurant Massacree" on YouTube

"Alice's Restaurant Massacree", commonly known as "Alice's Restaurant", is a satirical talking blues song by singer-songwriter Arlo Guthrie. Released as the title track to his 1967 debut album Alice's Restaurant, the song is a deadpan protest against the Vietnam War draft in the form of a comically exaggerated but largely true story from Guthrie's own life. While visiting acquaintances in Stockbridge, Massachusetts, he was arrested and convicted of dumping trash illegally, which later endangered his suitability for the military draft. The title refers to a restaurant owned by one of Guthrie's friends, the artist Alice Brock. Although Brock is a minor character in the story, the restaurant plays no role in it aside from being the subject of the chorus and the impetus for Guthrie's visit.

The song inspired the 1969 film Alice's Restaurant, which starred Guthrie and took numerous liberties with the story. The work has become Guthrie's signature song and he has periodically re-released it with updated lyrics. In 2017, it was selected for preservation in the National Recording Registry by the Library of Congress as being "culturally, historically, or aesthetically significant".

== Characteristics ==
The song consists of a protracted spoken monologue, with a constantly repeated fingerstyle Piedmont blues ragtime guitar backing and light brush-on-snare drum percussion (the drummer on the record is uncredited). This is bookended by a short chorus about the titular restaurant. Arlo Guthrie has used the brief "Alice's Restaurant" bookends and guitar backing for other monologues bearing the "Alice's Restaurant" name.

The track lasts 18 minutes and 34 seconds, occupying the entire A-side of the Alice's Restaurant album. Due to Guthrie's rambling and circuitous telling with unimportant details, it has been described as a shaggy dog story.

Guthrie refers to the incident as a "massacree", a colloquialism originating in the Ozark Mountains that describes "an event so wildly and improbably and baroquely messed up that the results are almost impossible to believe". It is a corruption of the word massacre, but carries a much lighter and more sarcastic connotation, rather than describing anything involving actual death.

== Story ==
=== Prologue ===
Guthrie introduces the song as "Alice's Restaurant", noting that the restaurant itself is not literally named Alice's Restaurant. He then sings the chorus, which is in the form of a jingle for the restaurant, beginning with "You can get anything you want at Alice's restaurant" twice, and continuing with directions to it before restating the slogan once more.

=== Part One ===
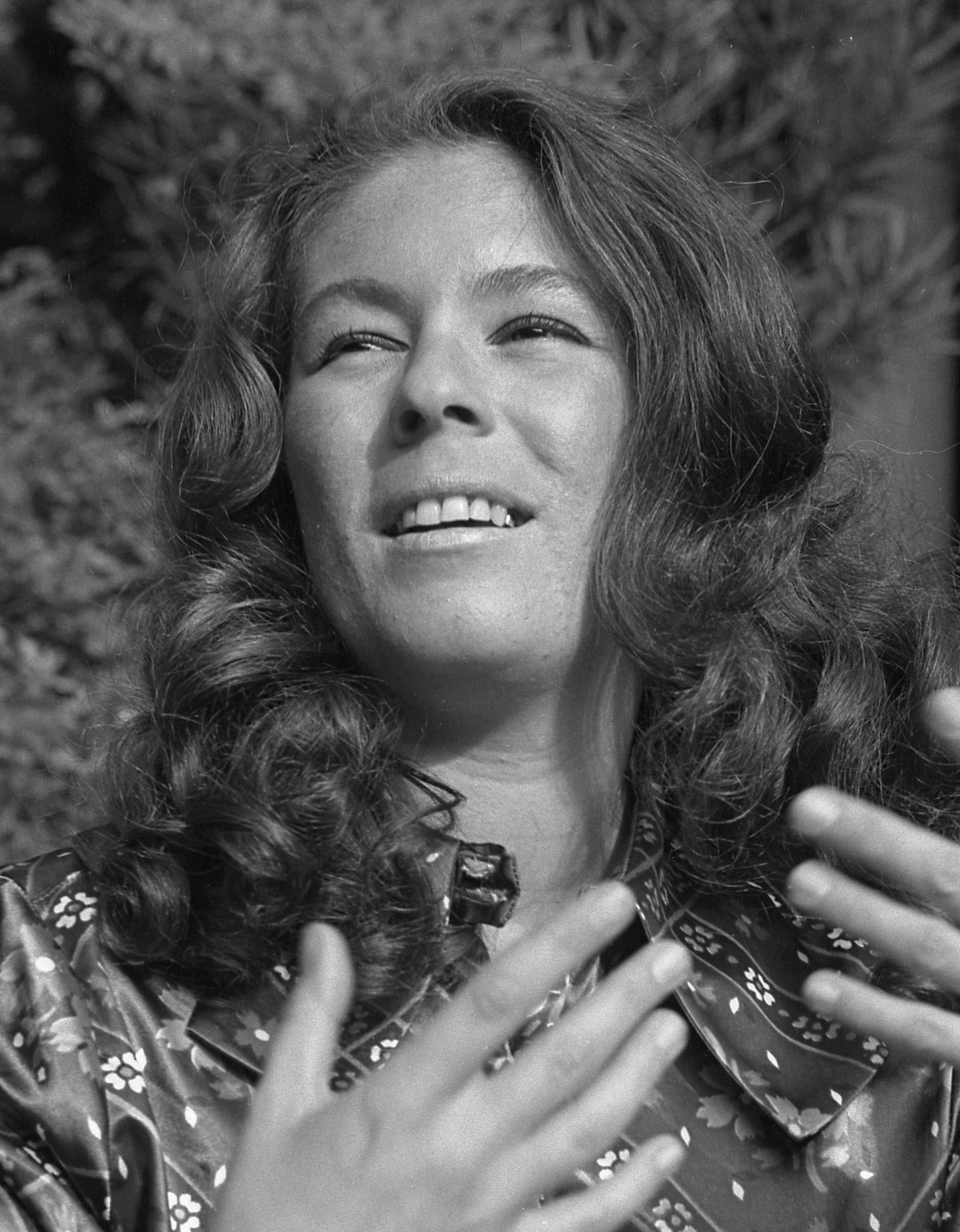
Alice Brock, the titular host of the Thanksgiving dinner who bailed Guthrie and his friend out of jail

Guthrie recounts events that took place in 1965 (two years prior to the time of the original recording), when he and a friend spent Thanksgiving Day at a deconsecrated church on the outskirts of Stockbridge, Massachusetts, which their friends Alice and Ray had been using as a home. As a favor to them, Guthrie and the friend volunteered to take their large accumulation of garbage to the local dump in their VW Microbus, not realizing until they arrived there that the dump would be closed for the holiday. They eventually noticed another pile of trash that had previously been dumped off a cliff near a side road, and added theirs to the accumulation before returning to the church for Thanksgiving dinner.

The next morning, the church received a phone call from the local police chief, "Officer Obie", saying that an envelope in the garbage pile had been traced back to them. Guthrie, stating "I cannot tell a lie" and with tongue in cheek, confessed that he "put that envelope underneath" the garbage. He and his friend drove to the police station, expecting a verbal reprimand and to be required to clean up the garbage, but they were instead arrested, handcuffed, and taken to the scene of the crime. There, Obie and a crew of police officers from the surrounding areas collected extensive forensic evidence of the litter, including "twenty-seven 8-by-10 color glossy photographs with circles and arrows and a paragraph on the back of each one explaining what each one was, to be used as evidence against us" amid a media circus of local media trying to get news stories on the littering. The young men were briefly jailed, with Obie taking drastic precautions to prevent Guthrie from escaping or committing suicide. After a few hours, Alice bailed them out and held another Thanksgiving dinner.

Guthrie and his friend stood trial the next day. When Obie saw that the judge relied upon a seeing-eye dog, he realized that the officers' meticulous work had been foiled by a literal "case of American blind justice", as the judge would not be able to see the evidence. Guthrie and his friend paid a fine of $50 (equivalent to $510.82 in 2025) to the court, and were ordered to pick up the garbage, in the snow.

=== Part Two ===
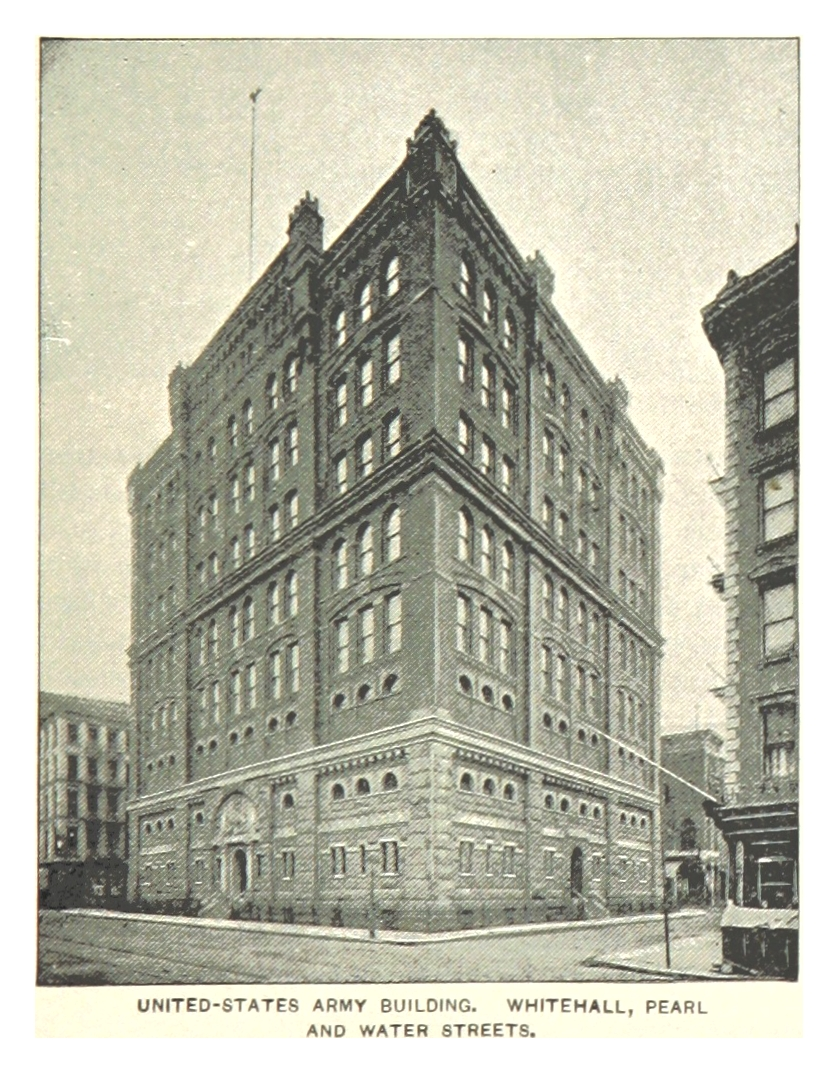
The Army Building where Guthrie had his physical examination

Guthrie then states that the littering incident was "not what I came to tell you about" and shifts to another story, this one based at the Army Building on Whitehall Street in New York City as Guthrie appeared for a physical exam related to the Vietnam War draft. He tried various strategies to be found unfit for military service, including getting drunk the night before so he was hung over, and attempting to convince the psychiatrist that he was homicidal, which only earned him praise.

After several hours, Guthrie was asked whether he had ever been convicted of a crime. He began to recount the littering incident and was sent to the "Group W" bench to file for a moral waiver. The other convicts ("mother-rapers... father-stabbers... father-rapers") were initially put off that his conviction had been for littering, but accepted him when he added "and creating a nuisance". When Guthrie noticed one of the questions on the paperwork asked whether he had rehabilitated himself since the crime, he noted the irony of having to prove himself reformed from a crime of littering when the realities of war were often far more brutal. The officer in charge of the induction process commented, "We don't like your kind", rejected Guthrie and sent his fingerprints to the federal government to be put on file.

=== Epilogue ===
In the final part of the song, Guthrie explains to the live audience that anyone finding themselves in a similar situation should walk into the military psychiatrist's office, sing the opening line from the chorus and walk out. He predicts that a single person doing it would be rejected as "sick" and that two people in harmony would be rejected as "faggots", but that once three people started doing it they would begin to suspect "an organization" and 50 people a day would be recognized as "the Alice's Restaurant Anti-Massacree Movement". As he continues fingerpicking, he invites the audience to sing the chorus along with him "the next time it comes around on the guitar". When they do so, Guthrie claims that their singing "was horrible", and challenges them to sing it with him "with four-part harmony and feeling". Guthrie and the crowd then sing the chorus, and the song concludes.

== Development ==
Guthrie cited the long-form monologues of Lord Buckley and Bill Cosby, and the movies of Charlie Chaplin, as inspirations for the song's lyrics, and a number of different musicians (in particular Mississippi John Hurt) as inspirations for the Piedmont fingerstyle guitar accompaniment, noting that he took about "two seconds" to come up with the accompaniment because he wanted something easy to play mindlessly while narrating the story. Guthrie acknowledged in 1969 that the melody was inspired by the children's song "Old MacDonald Had a Farm." The song was written as the events happened over the course of approximately one year; it grew out of a simple joke riff Guthrie had been working on in 1965 and 1966 before he appeared before the draft board (the opening was originally written as "you can hide from Obanhein at Alice's restaurant", which is how the restaurant got tied into the original story). The earliest performance of a song bearing the "Alice's Restaurant" name was at Gerde's Folk City in July 1966; this song, though its chorus remained the same and bore a few elements of similarity, was otherwise a completely different monologue later dubbed "Alice's Restaurant Around the World" with a slower and more bluesy arrangement, a vocal style more explicitly mimicking his father Woody Guthrie (the advertising for the show identified him as "Woody's son"), and a monologue containing nothing about the littering incident or his draft board appearance, instead telling the story of the chorus going viral. The littering incident was added to the monologue by September 1966. Additional portions of the song were written during one of Guthrie's many stays with the English songwriter and music journalist Karl Dallas and his family in London in December 1966. By February 1967, the draft story had been added, completing the song in its best-known form.

== Response ==
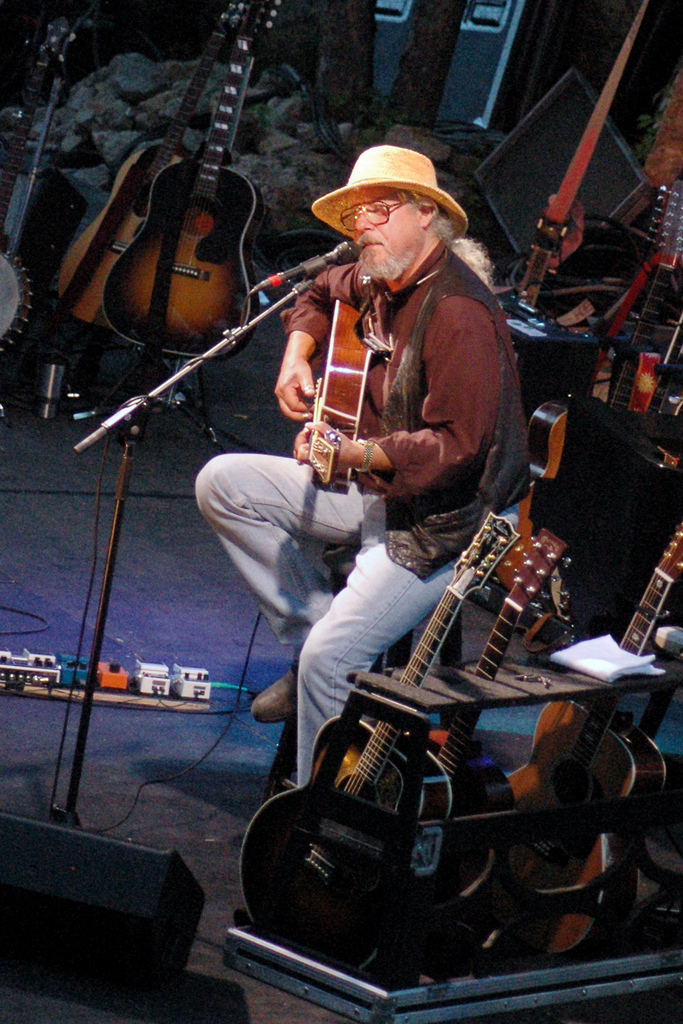
Guthrie performing during his 2005 Alice's Restaurant Massacree 40th Anniversary tour

=== 1960s ===
Guthrie performed the finished song live on Radio Unnameable, the overnight program hosted by Bob Fass that aired on New York radio station WBAI, one evening in February 1967, following a year of Guthrie honing the song at various small venues. The initial performance was part of an impromptu supergroup at the WBAI studios that included David Bromberg, Jerry Jeff Walker and Ramblin' Jack Elliot. Guthrie performed the song several times live on WBAI in 1967 before its commercial release. By May 1967, the song had proved so popular that at one point Fass (who was known for playing songs he liked over and over again in his graveyard slot) started playing a recording of one of Guthrie's live performances of the song repeatedly; eventually the non-commercial station rebroadcast it only when listeners pledged to donate a large amount of money. (Fass subverted it and occasionally asked for donations to get him to stop playing the recording.)

"Alice's Restaurant" was performed on July 17, 1967, at the Newport Folk Festival in a workshop or breakout section on "topical songs", where it was such a hit that he was called upon to perform it for the entire festival audience. Faced with an increasing number of bootleg recordings of his performances achieving wide circulation, Guthrie's agent pressed him to record it in front of a studio audience in New York City and release it as side one of the album Alice's Restaurant in October 1967. Guthrie noted that the studio recording combined some of the worst elements of both studio and live recording, in that the audience chosen for the record had already heard him perform the song repeatedly, but because of the audience, he had to record the song and album in one take.

Guthrie sent a demo recording of the song to his father on his deathbed; it was, according to a "family joke", the last thing Woody heard before he died in October 1967. Because of the song's length, Guthrie never expected it to be released, because such extended monologues were extremely rare in an era when singles were typically less than three minutes.

The original album spent 16 weeks on the Billboard 200 album chart, peaking at #29 during the week of March 2, 1968, then reentered the chart on December 27, 1969, after the film version was released, peaking that time at #63. In the wake of the film version, Guthrie recorded a more single-friendly edit of the chorus in 1969. Titled "Alice's Rock & Roll Restaurant", it included three verses, all of which advertise the restaurant, and a fiddle solo by country singer Doug Kershaw; to fit the song on a record, the monologue was removed, bringing the song's length to 4:43. This version, backed with "Ring Around the Rosy Rag" (a cut from the Alice's Restaurant album), peaked at #97 on the Billboard Hot 100, and #64 in Canada. Because the single did not reach the popularity of the full version, which did not qualify for the Hot 100 because of its length, Billboard officially classifies Guthrie as a one-hit wonder for his later hit "City of New Orleans".

After the release of the original album, Guthrie continued to perform the song in concert, regularly revising and updating the lyrics. In 1969, for instance, he performed a 20-minute rendition of the song that, instead of the original narrative, told a fictional story of how Russian and Chinese military operatives attempted to weaponize "multicolored rainbow roaches" they had found at Alice's restaurant, and the Lyndon Johnson administration orchestrated a plan for the nation to defend itself. A 30-minute recording of this version titled "Alice: Before Time Began," which included a prologue explaining the song's supposed origins in ancient Egypt, where it passed through the Hebrews, Europe, and into America via the Pilgrims, was released in 2009 on the album Tales of '69 distributed by Guthrie's Rising Son Records label; another recording of this version, titled "The Alice's Restaurant Multicolored Rainbow Roach Affair", was also released on that label. In 1970, the song was used as an anthem for WBAI's sister station KPFT-FM in Houston, Texas, after that station had repeatedly been bombed by the Ku Klux Klan; Guthrie came and performed the song live after the station returned to the air following the second bombing.

=== Developing tradition ===
It has become a tradition for many classic rock and adult album alternative radio stations to play the song each Thanksgiving. Guthrie surmised that its emergence as a radio tradition came from disc jockeys, who at the time did not have the benefits of voice-tracking or automation and would take advantage of the song's length to leave the studio for a break; "Alice's Restaurant" was a good fit for such purposes especially in November, given the song's Thanksgiving setting. The first stations other than WBAI to give the record substantial airplay were smaller FM stations in New York City that ran freeform and underground-progressive formats. John Gorman's recollection was typical of the song's pattern of growth: while working as a program director at WMMS in Cleveland, Ohio in 1974, the Massachusetts native incorporated the record into his holiday music lineup; positive feedback led him to bring the song back the next year, and in time, "next year became every year." Portions of the rural United States were still unaware of the song as late as the 1980s.

Despite its mention of the slur "faggots", radio stations generally present the song uncensored as it was originally recorded, and the Federal Communications Commission has never punished a station for playing it. When performing the song in later years, Guthrie began to change the line to something less offensive and often topical: during the 1990s and 2000s, the song alluded to the Seinfeld 1993 fourth season episode "The Outing" by saying "They'll think you're gay—not that there's anything wrong with that," and in 2015, Guthrie used the line "They'll think they're trying to get married in some parts of Kentucky", a nod to the controversy of the time surrounding county clerk Kim Davis.

By the late 1970s, Guthrie had removed the song from his regular concert repertoire. In 1984, Guthrie, who was supporting George McGovern's ultimately unsuccessful comeback bid for the Democratic presidential nomination, revived "Alice's Restaurant" to protest the Reagan Administration's reactivation of the Selective Service System registrations. That version has not been released on a commercial recording; at least one bootleg of it from one of Guthrie's performances exists. It was this tour, which occurred near the 20th anniversary of the song (and continued as a general tour after McGovern dropped out of the race), that prompted Guthrie to return the song to his playlist every ten years, usually coinciding with the anniversary of either the song or the incident. The 30th anniversary version of the song includes a follow-up recounting how he learned that Richard Nixon had owned a copy of the song, and he jokingly suggested that this explained the famous 18½-minute gap in the Watergate tapes.

Guthrie rerecorded his entire debut album for his 1997 CD Alice's Restaurant: The Massacree Revisited, on the Rising Son label, which includes this expanded version. The 40th anniversary edition, performed at and released as a recording by the Kerrville Folk Festival, made note of some parallels between the 1960s and the Iraq War and George W. Bush administration. Guthrie revived the song for the 50th anniversary edition in 2015, which he expected would be the last time he would do so. In 2018, at which point he decided he was too old to care about overplaying the song anymore, Guthrie began the Alice's Restaurant: Back by Popular Demand Tour, reuniting with members of his 1970s backing band Shenandoah. The tour, which features Guthrie's daughter Sarah Lee Guthrie as the opening act, was scheduled to wrap up in 2020. To justify bringing the song back out of its usual ten-year sequence, he stated that he was doing so to commemorate the 50th anniversary of the film version of the song. The tour ended in 2019 and was later confirmed to have been Guthrie's last; he suffered a career-ending stroke in November of that year and announced his retirement in October 2020.

For the 60th anniversary edition, Guthrie made an in-person appearance at the Guthrie Center and granted an interview, noting that he had wished he could have been on the road like some of his older friends who were still performing.

Recorded versions timeline:

– Original album (1967)

– Film soundtrack recording (1969)

– "The Alice's Restaurant Multi-Colored Rainbow Roach Affair" (recorded 1969, released 2015), alternate storyline

– "Alice-Before Time Began" (recorded 1969, released 2010), alternate storyline

– 30th anniversary - "Alice's Restaurant (The Massacree Revisited)" (1995)

– 40th anniversary (2006) (available only on Apple Music/iTunes)

– 50th anniversary (2016) (PBS special)

=== Artist's reflections ===
In a 2014 interview with Rolling Stone, Guthrie said he believed there are such things as just wars, and that the message of this song was targeted at the Vietnam War in particular. Interviews with Ron Bennington in 2009 and NPR in 2005 describe the song not so much as against war but as "against stupidity". Guthrie considered the song as relevant in 2015 as it was in 1965, particularly in that Millennials and Generation Z were, much like the Baby Boomers of his era, beginning to coalesce as a bloc in opposition to the "very sophisticated manipulation" from major authority figures and institutions of the era, something that Guthrie believed Baby Boomers would find familiar.

== Historicity ==
Most of the events of the story are true; the littering incident was recorded in the local newspaper at the time it happened, and although Guthrie made some minor embellishments, the persons mentioned in the first half of the story all granted interviews on the subject, mostly verifying that part of the story. The second half of the story does not have as much specific corroborating evidence to support it; the public exposure of COINTELPRO in 1971 confirmed that the federal government was collecting personal information on anti-war protesters as Guthrie alleged, and Guthrie's father was known to have been on the FBI watchlists due to his Communist sympathies.

=== Alice, Ray and the restaurant ===
The Alice in the song was restaurant-owner Alice May Brock (1941–2024). In 1963, shortly after dropping out of Sarah Lawrence College, Alice used $2,000 supplied by her mother to purchase a deconsecrated church in Great Barrington, Massachusetts, where Alice and her husband, Ray Brock (1929–August 1, 1979), would live. Alice was a painter and designer, while Ray was an architect and woodworker who originally was from Hartfield, Virginia; the two had met while in Greenwich Village in 1960. Both worked at a nearby private academy, the music and art-oriented Stockbridge School, from which Guthrie (then of Howard Beach, a neighborhood in Queens, New York City) had graduated.

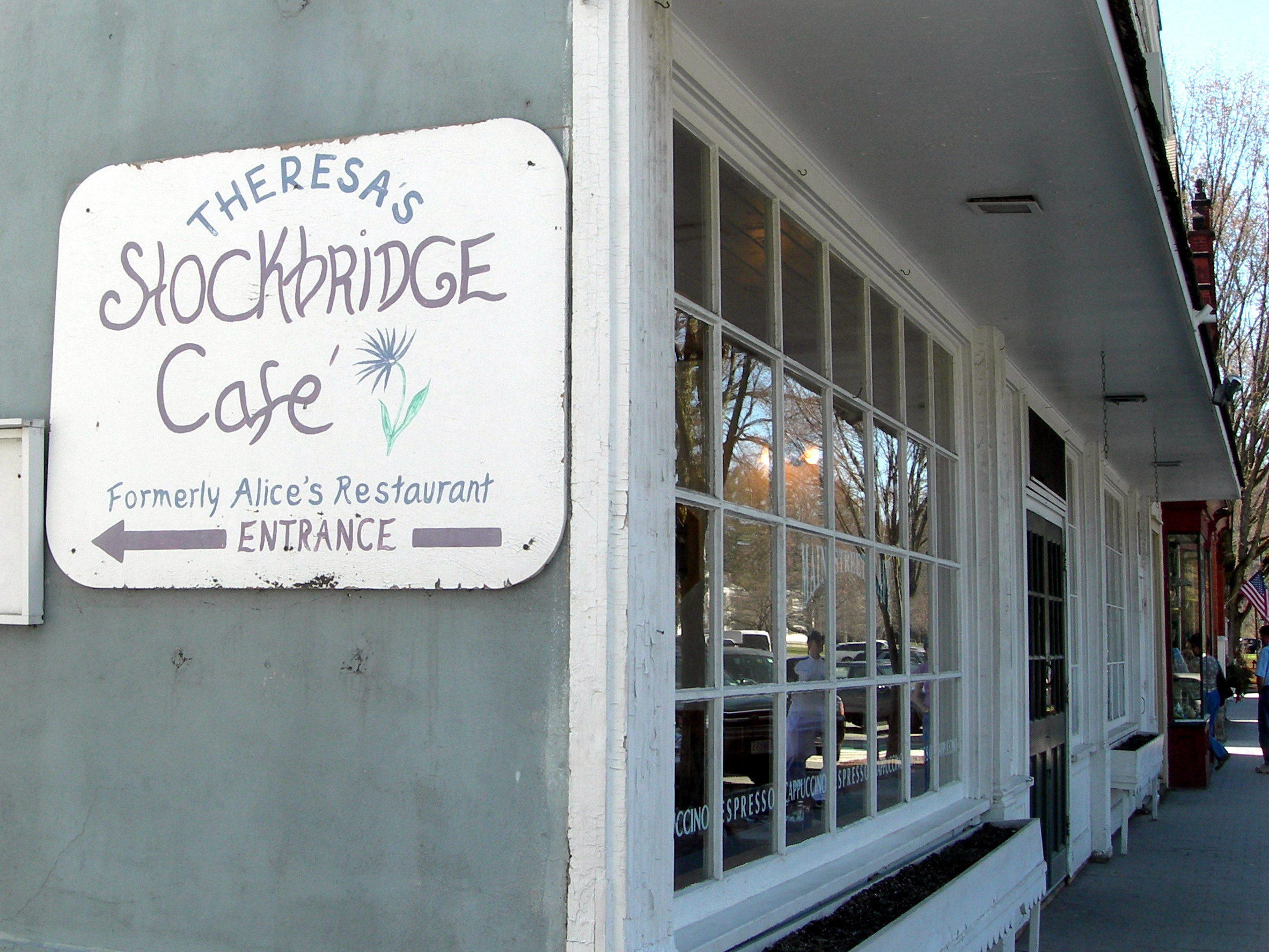
Sign to restaurant

Alice Brock operated a restaurant called "The Back Room" in 1966, at 40 Main Street in Stockbridge, located behind a grocery store and directly underneath the studios of Norman Rockwell. The Back Room was already closed by the time the song was released; it ceased operations in April 1966. (Theresa's Stockbridge Café was last known to occupy the site; the café's sign makes note that the space was "formerly Alice's Restaurant". Theresa's was closed by 2022, but the sign pointing to the restaurant remained.) After a breakup and abortive reconciliation, Alice divorced Ray in 1968; she went on to launch two more restaurants (a take-out window in Housatonic in 1971 and a much larger establishment in Lenox in the late 1970s) before leaving the restaurant business in 1979. Ray returned to Virginia after the divorce and took on various projects until his death in 1979.

Alice owned an art studio and gallery in Provincetown, Massachusetts, until 2016. She illustrated the 2004 children's book Mooses Come Walking, written by Guthrie, and authored and illustrated another, How to Massage Your Cat. She and Guthrie remained friends the rest of her life, typically visiting each other during the summers.

In 1969, Random House published The Alice's Restaurant Cookbook (ISBN 039440100X) which featured recipes and hippie wisdom from Alice Brock, as well as photos of Alice and Guthrie, and publicity stills from the movie. A tear-out record was included in the book with Brock and Guthrie bantering on two tracks, "Italian-Type Meatballs" and "My Granma's Beet Jam".

Brock, Guthrie and Rick Robbins (the friend who assisted Guthrie in disposing of the garbage) reunited for Thanksgiving dinner in 2022, the only time all three of them would spend Thanksgiving together after the events depicted in the song; Guthrie has typically gone south for the winter but chose to stay in Massachusetts that year. Guthrie said of the experience: "We had a nice Thanksgiving (, but) once was enough." Brock died November 21, 2024 following years of declining health.

Alice Brock, in general, approved of the song, considering it "great and very funny" with "a message of all the right things(.)" She had some misgivings about the fame that resulted from it, particularly after the film was released, which she consistently denounced as a mischaracterization.

=== The church ===
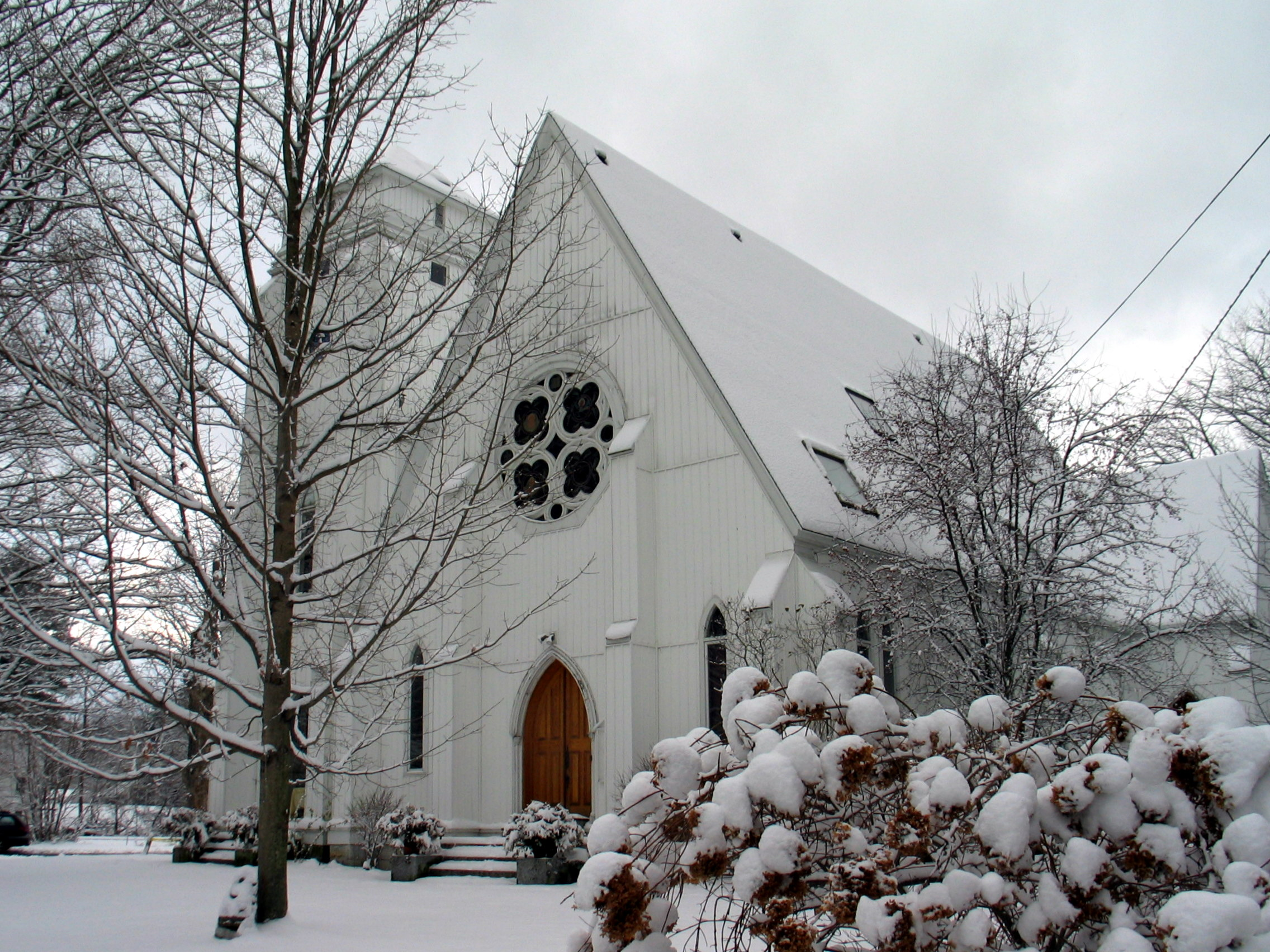
The former church where the story begins, located at 4 Van Deusenville Road in Great Barrington, Massachusetts; the building later became the Guthrie Center.

The church, originally built as the St. James Chapel in 1829, was enlarged in 1866 and renamed Trinity Church. Ray and Alice Brock purchased the property in 1963 and made it their home. Alice sold the building shortly after the film adaptation was released, commenting that the song and film had brought a great deal of unwanted publicity. The building changed ownership several times in the 1970s and 1980s until Guthrie bought the facility in 1991 and converted it to the Guthrie Center, a nondenominational, interfaith meeting place. Brock was pleasantly surprised that Guthrie had ended up with the building.

In the main chapel area is a stage on which Officer Obie's chair sits as a reminder of the arrest. A set of private rooms in which Alice and Ray once lived remains.

In later years, the Guthrie Center became a folk music venue, hosting a Thursday evening hootenanny as well as the Troubadour Concert series annually from Memorial Day to Labor Day. Musical guests have included John Gorka, Tom Paxton, Ellis Paul, Tom Rush, The Highwaymen folk group and Arlo Guthrie. The Troubadour series helps to support the church's free community lunch program which is held at the church every Wednesday at noon. On Thanksgiving, the church hosts a "Thanksgiving dinner that can't be beat" for the local community. The annual "Garbage Trail Walk", retracing the steps of Arlo and folksinger Rick Robbins (as told in the song), raises money for Huntington's disease research.

The folding table on which Guthrie had written the first lines of "Alice's Restaurant" remained in Alice Brock's possession, the only item she still held from her time in the area at the time she died.

=== The littering incident ===
The incident which Guthrie recounts in the first half of the song was reported in The Berkshire Eagle on November 29, 1965. It describes the conviction of Richard J. Robbins, age 19, and Arlo Guthrie, age 18, for illegally disposing of rubbish, and a fine of $25 each, plus an order to remove the trash. The arresting officer was Stockbridge police chief William J. Obanhein ("Officer Obie"), and the Eagle identified the incriminating evidence as an envelope addressed to a male resident of Great Barrington (presumably Ray Brock). Guthrie remarked that it was Alice who answered Obanhein's phone call: "it wasn't me, but I think I know who did it." The trial was presided over by Special Judge James E. Hannon, who was visually impaired and worked with the aid of a guide dog named Susie. Judge Hannon, who served Lee District Courts for decades, made a cameo appearance along with Susie in the 1969 movie.

In a 1972 interview with Playboy's Music Scene, Obanhein denied handcuffing Guthrie and Robbins. He also said the real reason there was no toilet seat in the jail cell was to prevent such items from being stolen, not as a suicide deterrent as Guthrie had joked. Guthrie also admitted in 2020 that the police photographs were in black-and-white, not in color. Robbins commented that the reason neither he nor Guthrie understood that landfills were not always open was because they had both spent most of their upbringings in New York City where the Department of Sanitation handled curbside pickup of all garbage. The Microbus that Guthrie and Robbins used to dispose of the garbage was eventually scrapped; the Guthrie Center later acquired a replica that Guthrie occasionally drives.

=== The draft ===
The Armed Forces Examination and Entrance Station was part of a large complex at 39 Whitehall Street in New York City from 1884 to 1969. By the late 1960s, the building had become a target for anti-war protesters, and two bombings left minor damage to the building, prompting the building to be vacated. The building has since been repurposed as a mixed-use development and its address changed (it is now 3 New York Plaza).

Guthrie had appeared at the Whitehall Street facilities in March 1966, after his application for conscientious objector status was rejected. He later acknowledged that he was never in danger of being drafted, since he had been given a high draft number. A friend commented that he and Guthrie were "not going to get called unless there's a squirrel invasion in New Hampshire."

The brief mention of "faggots" being rejected for military service in the song's epilogue was based on military policy at the time, which rejected all homosexuals and expelled anyone caught engaging in homosexual behavior with a section 8 dishonorable discharge. The policy was modified in 1993 and fully repealed in 2012.

== Legacy ==
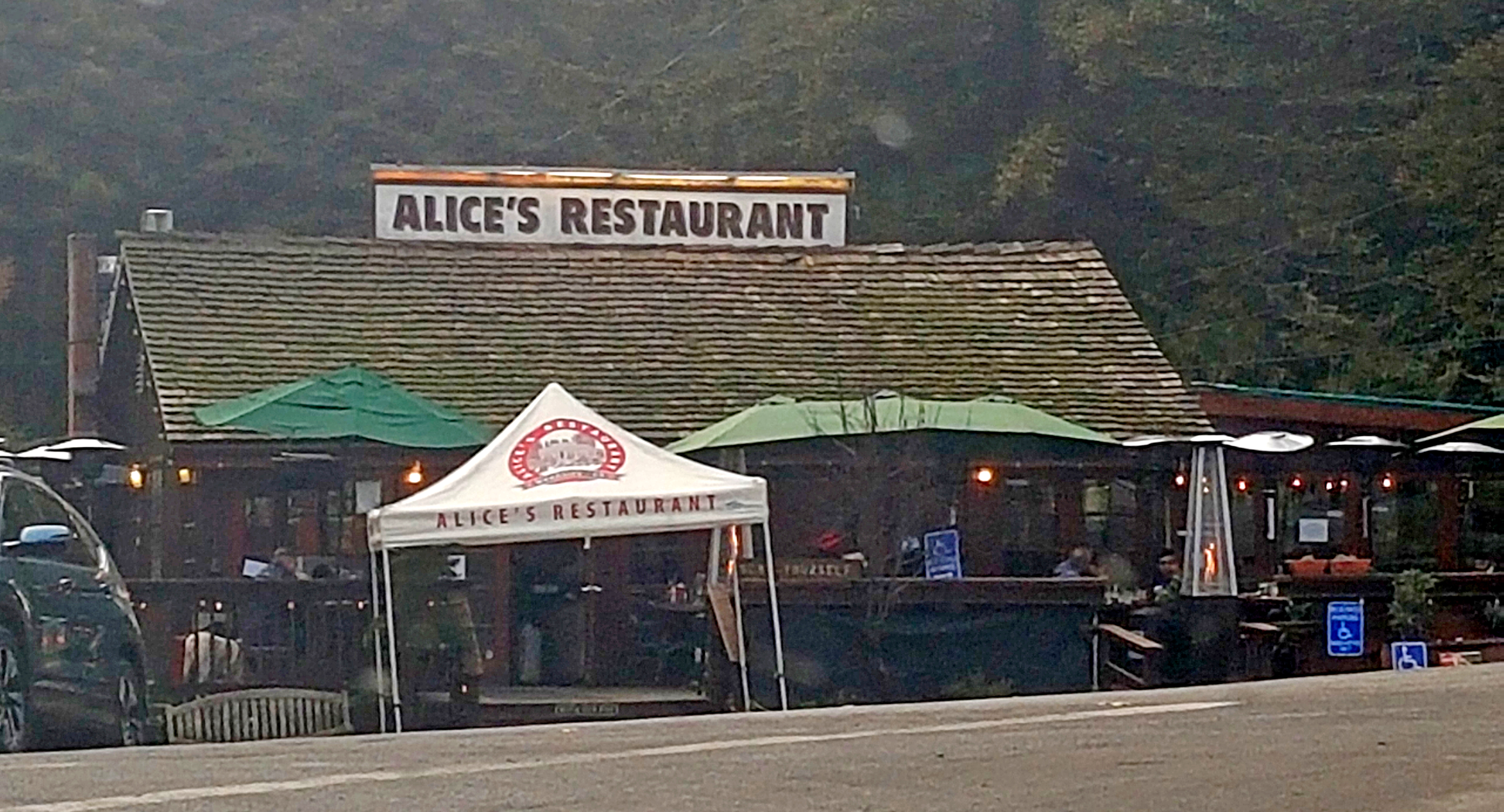
Namesake Alice's Restaurant in Sky Londa, California

Alice's Restaurant of Sky Londa, California, founded in the 1960s, was originally founded by Alice Taylor with no connection to Alice Brock. Subsequent owners of the restaurant kept the original name as a homage to the song, eventually adding a "Group W bench", because the name had made the restaurant a tourist attraction that was "good for business."

The programming language Smalltalk was written around the same time. The song played a minor role that lives on today. The choices to adopt some of the language in the song has spread to other languages that may not even know that Alice's Restaurant helped to inspire. The lyrics: "They got a building down New York City, it’s called Whitehall Street, Where you walk in, you get injected, inspected, detected, infected, neglected and selected." helped shape the programming methods #inject #inspect #detect, #select.

The German singer-songwriter Hannes Wader used the tune for his anarchistic song "Der Tankerkönig" ("The Tanker King").

== Feature film ==
The song was adapted into the 1969 movie Alice's Restaurant, directed and co-written by Arthur Penn, who had heard the song in 1967 while living in Stockbridge and immediately wanted to make the song into a movie. Guthrie appears as himself, with Pat Quinn as Alice Brock and James Broderick as Ray Brock, William Obanhein and James Hannon appearing as themselves, and Alice Brock making a cameo appearance.

The film was released in August 1969, a few days after Guthrie appeared at the Woodstock Festival, and a soundtrack album was released by United Artists Records. The soundtrack includes a studio version of "Alice's Restaurant", which was originally divided into two parts (one for each album side). A compact disc reissue on the Rykodisc label presents this version in full and adds several bonus tracks to the original LP.

== See also ==
- List of anti-war songs
- Shaggy dog story
