= Moral waiver =

US Armed Forces legal provision

A moral waiver is an action by United States armed forces officials to accept, for induction into one of the military services, a recruit who is otherwise disqualified for one or more of several reasons.

The mechanism dates from at least the mid-1960s, and was by no later than 1969 part of Army Regulation 601-270. There are several cases where a large number of moral waivers were issued for the purpose of meeting recruitment goals. As of 2009, the "major revision" effective in March 2007 and titled "Military Entrance Processing Station (MEPS)" remains in effect; in that revision, Chapter 9 ("Processing of Selective Service System Registrants"), Section III ("Determination of Moral Qualifications and Waivers") is primarily concerned with moral waiver.

Each disqualifying situation involves at least multiple convictions for minor traffic offenses, or a single conviction of a more serious charge. The waiver-granting official would be either the commanding officer of the induction center, or the commander of the national induction-center system; the regulations permit partial discretion as to which of the two applies only in the case of serious juvenile offenses: for adverse juvenile adjudication for one or more juvenile "felonies" (where the quotation marks are part of the regulation), the induction center commander may either reject the inductee on that commander's own authority, or submit the case for consideration of a moral waiver by the national commander. A single adult felony conviction could be subject to moral waiver, at the discretion of the national commander, but multiple ones are completely disqualifying. While those convicted or were found guilty of offenses are deemed unacceptable for service, the Armed Forces Moral Waiver Determination Board can still issue an exemption and render such disqualification waivered.

== Popular culture ==
The Group W bench, a key element of Arlo Guthrie's 1967 folk song and extended monologue "Alice's Restaurant", is a reference to the moral waiver provision―the W stands for "waiver." He described that key element of the work as a waiting area where he mingled with other potential inductees awaiting consideration for a waiver and stated that all sorts of crimes, ranging from rape, sodomy and assault with a deadly weapon down to littering (Guthrie's crime) could necessitate its use. The Guthrie work made the expression "Group W bench" (or occasionally simply "Group W," not to be confused with the Group W brand used by Westinghouse Broadcasting) a catchphrase for non-conformity. Various websites, and a well established "eclectic boutique" in New Haven, Connecticut, take their names from it.

== Potential effects in Iraq War era ==
In the 2000s, maintaining higher troop levels in the face of higher casualties required two changes in the US Army. Tours of duty were increased and a higher fraction of volunteers were inducted via moral waivers. A Defense Department sponsored report described increased length of tours leading to higher stress which increase manifestations of anger and disrespect for civilians.

John D. Hutson, dean and president of the Franklin Pierce Law Center (now the University of New Hampshire Law School) in New Hampshire and former judge advocate general of the US Navy, said the military must tread carefully in deciding which persons with criminal histories to accept. He says that there is a reason why allowing people with criminal histories into the military has long been the exception rather than the rule, and

If you are recruiting somebody who has demonstrated some sort of antisocial behavior and then you are a putting a gun in their hands, you have to be awfully careful about what you are doing. You are not putting a hammer in their hands, or asking them to sell used cars. You are potentially asking them to kill people.
