= The Nueva School =

Nueva School
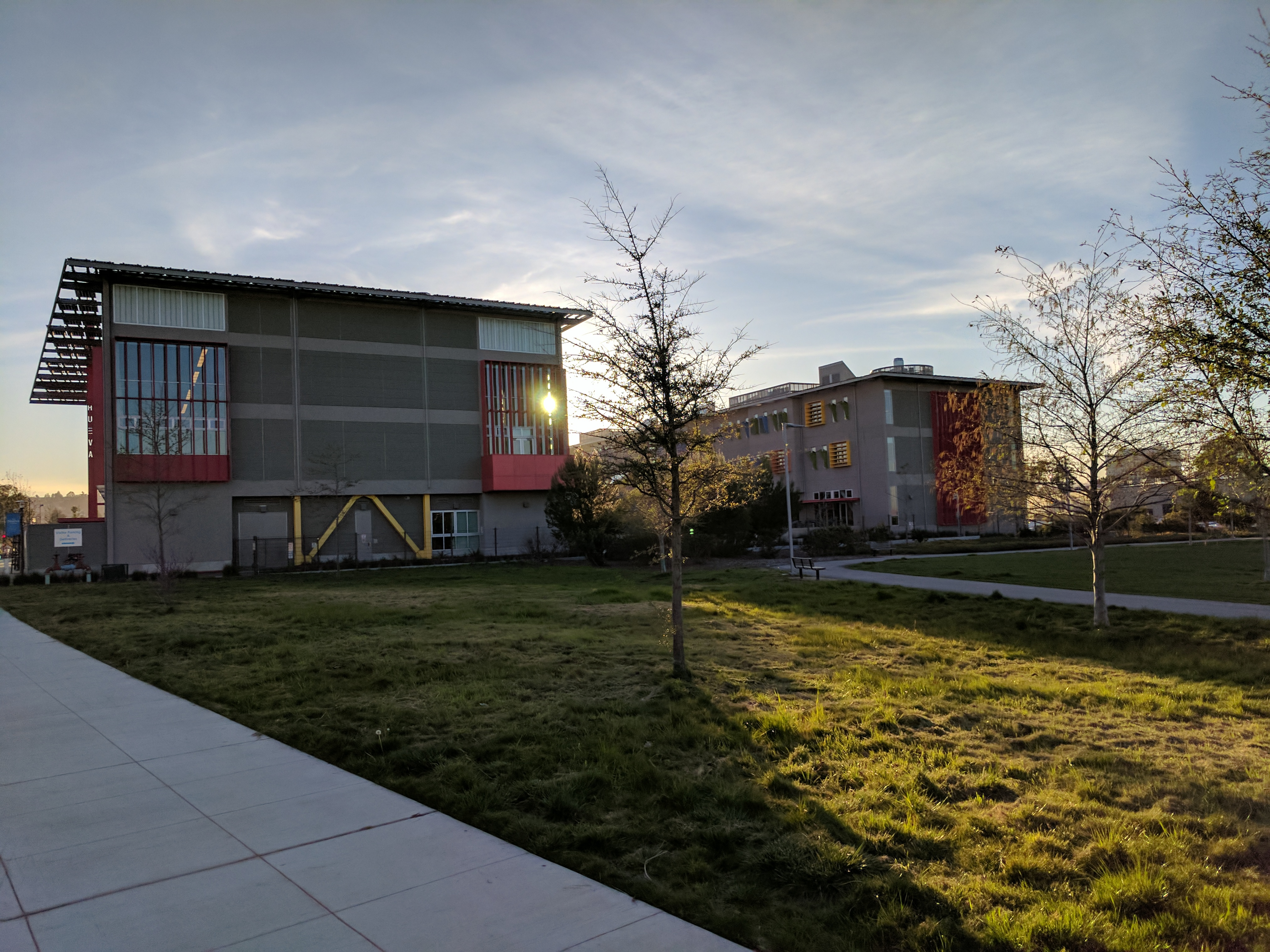
- Upper School campus

Location
- Hillsborough and San Mateo, California; United States; 37°33′44″N 122°22′52″W

Information
- Type: Private, coeducational
- Motto: "Learn by doing, learn by caring"
- Established: 1967; 59 years ago
- CEEB code: 051213
- NCES School ID: 00089169
- Head of School: Lee Fertig
- Faculty: 140 full-time
- Enrollment: 930 (PreK–12)
- Classes: 15–18
- Student to teacher ratio: 6.5:1
- Campuses: Hillsborough, Bay Meadows
- Campus size: Combined area: 36 acres (150,000 m^{2})
- Colors: Blue and white
- Athletics: Basketball, Cross-Country, Flag Football, Soccer, Squash, Tennis, Track and Field, Volleyball, Golf
- Mascot: Mavericks
- Team name: Mavericks (athletics)
- Website: https://www.nuevaschool.org/

The Nueva School is a private school with two campuses serving gifted students in pre-kindergarten through twelfth grade. The lower and middle schools are located in Hillsborough, and the upper school is located in San Mateo, California.

Nueva was founded in 1967 by Karen Stone McCown. Originally, the school only served younger students, but in 2013, it expanded to include a high school. The new upper school was built as a part of the Bay Meadows development in San Mateo, opening in August 2014.

Unique aspects of Nueva's curriculum include its focus on design thinking and social emotional learning. In his book That Used To Be Us, commentator Thomas Friedman lauded Nueva for its creativity-inspiring curriculum and overall philosophy.

Nueva is accredited by the Western Association of Schools and Colleges and the California Association of Independent Schools. It has received the Blue Ribbon Award from the U.S. Department of Education in 1988, 1997, and 2010. Nueva was rated the #1 private K-12 school and the #3 private high school in the United States by Niche in 2021.

In 2024, the school announced that it would grant free tuition to admitted students with family incomes under $150,000 a year and "with assets typical of that income level." In addition, for students with family incomes between $150,000 and $250,000, tuition is capped at 10% of household income. In the 2024–25 school year, the school reported that 20% of the student body was on financial aid and that 51% of scholarship students had family incomes over $250,000.

== History ==
In 1965, Karen Stone McCown started planning a school for gifted and talented students, funded by her father-in-law, W. Clement Stone. She convened a group of 18 Nobel Prize winners to discuss what kind of school would have suited them in their childhoods. Based on the meeting, she planned a school that would emphasize creativity, independence, active learning, and social and emotional learning. A board, including members Ernest "Jack" Hilgard and Meredith Wilson, helped found the school. In 1967, the school was founded on Sand Hill Road in Menlo Park, California, starting with students in kindergarten, first, and second grade, with the intention of adding one grade each year until the sixth grade. In 1971, it moved to Crocker Mansion in Hillsborough, California. In 2013, the school expanded to the high school level.

== Academics ==
The Nueva School is known for having a progressive curriculum utilizing project-based learning, with a motto of "Learn by doing, learn by caring."

The school provide a vast selection of advanced STEM electives, with several elective computer science courses, including a two-semester sequence on machine learning. In mathematics, there is an integrated core curriculum, along with advanced elective classes in the upper school including multivariable calculus and complex analysis. Advanced science courses include drug design and bioorganic chemistry. Spanish, Mandarin Chinese, and Japanese are offered as language classes in the middle and upper school. While Nueva does not have honors or Advanced Placement classes, the school claims that most of the core classes "meet or exceed the rigor of Advanced Placement," with most core and elective courses being marked "honors" by UC. Additionally, the Nueva School offers a stage-not-age style math system, allowing students who exceed their grade's requirements to take advanced courses.

Among the upper school faculty, nearly 80% hold advanced degrees. Average standardized test scores at the upper school are 34 out of 36 for the ACT, 743 out of 800 on the reading and writing section of the SAT, and 760 out of 800 on the mathematics section of the SAT.

Starting in 2007, Nueva had one of the first design thinking programs for PreK-8, now PreK-12 students, providing every student with training in design thinking methodology, engineering classes, projects, and practices that are now central to Nueva's learning approach. The Innovation Lab (I-Lab) is a space on campus dedicated to design thinking projects, where engineers help students with projects.

The school's social emotional learning (SEL) curriculum, originally called Self-Science, has been part of a Nueva education since its founding. This curriculum teaches the skills of self-awareness, self-management, social awareness, relationship skills, and responsible decision-making. All teachers receive SEL training, and there are also dedicated SEL classes taught by specialists. Upper school SEL classes (formerly called "Science of Mind") also cover psychology and neuroscience. The SEL curriculum was highlighted by Daniel Goleman in his book Emotional Intelligence.

Nueva's Menuhin program, which teaches musical theory and practice to selected students in the first through eighth grades, was established by Sir Yehudi Menuhin and Helen Dowling.

=== Grading ===
In the upper school and middle school, Nueva grades with written evaluations and rubrics instead of just letter grades. The grading is not just based on academic achievement, but also on soft skills like curiosity and self-improvement. Rubrics have three sections: opportunities, meeting expectations, and celebrations. While students do receive letter grades in grades 10–12, in ninth grade classes are on a credit/no credit basis. Class rank is not computed, and there is no valedictorian. Nueva is part of the Mastery Transcript Consortium, a group of schools designing a form of transcript emphasizing mastery of specific skills instead of traditional grades.

=== Annual school trips ===
Another element of a Nueva education is the annual trips program that occurs each year from first through twelfth grade. First graders participate in a one-night sleepover in the ballroom space. Second, third, and fourth graders go on grade level camping trips that are two, three, and four days long, respectively. Fifth-grade students visit Monterey. Sixth grade students travel to Washington, DC. Seventh-grade students go to Los Angeles and visit Japanese, Chinese and Spanish communities, also researching the film industry. Eighth-grade students travel to either Spain, China, or Japan depending on their language study, participating in a homestay.

In the Upper School, prior to the COVID-19 Pandemic, ninth-grade students participated in annual trips to Peru to visit Machu Picchu. Currently, ninth-grade students take trips to the Pacific Northwest. Tenth-graders travel to Costa Rica to work with the Upwell Turtles and the Monteverde Institute in conjunction with their biology curriculum, and currently take trips to Hawaii to study sustainability and post-colonial theory. Eleventh-grade students break up into several groups and travel to various locations in the United States as part of their American Studies curriculum. Twelfth-graders visit Argentina, Taiwan, France, and various other countries.

== Extracurricular activities ==
There are more than 50 clubs at Nueva, including a FIRST robotics team, an Economics Club, a Cheese club, and a Mock Trial team. Nueva students have received national recognition for extracurricular achievement. Nueva students have won the U.S. Mathematical Olympiad and competed at the International Mathematics Olympiad, been finalists at the MathWorks Math Modeling Challenge, won second place at the Broadcom MASTERS science competition, been named a Davidson Fellow for research on Alzheimer's disease, been recognized as Regeneron Science Talent Search finalists, won third place at the National Geographic Bee, won the Caroline D. Bradley Scholarship, and competed at the international Prix de Lausanne dance competition. Nearly 10% of Nueva's senior class won National Merit Scholarships in 2019.

Nueva also hosts a journal club called DATAS. In addition to functioning as a journal club, DATAS hosts weekly talks, by students and external experts, called "Science Fridays." For over a decade, DATAS has hosted over 200 talks. Past guest speakers have included well-known academics, such as Dr. Robert Sapolsky and Dr. Siddhartha Mukherjee. At Science Fridays, organizers frequently hand out trays of samosas as a way to incentivize attendance.

=== Speech and Debate ===
Nueva is a perennial national contender in both parliamentary debate and public forum debate. Nueva students have been ranked in the top 5 teams nationally in parliamentary debate for five consecutive school years since 2021. Their public forum team has also consistently reached late elimination rounds at the Tournament of Champions, most notably winning the gold division of the tournament in 2017 and 2026—more than any other California team in the same timespan.

The Model UN team at Nueva is widely considered to be one of the top teams in the nation. In addition to consistently earning top team awards at the National High School Model United Nations (NHSMUN) conference in New York, it hosts the largest Model UN resource written by high schoolers in the world: the Nueva MUN wiki. In addition to being free, the Nueva Model UN wiki is composed of over 220 pages of extensive guides and strategies. Further, the team frequently organizes Current Affairs Presentations (CAP) that are open to the school. Past CAP speakers have included high-profile journalists and think tank fellows, such as Doug Bandow, Clayton Swope, Jack Detsch, and Marvin Weinbaum. Finally, the team hosts an annual Model UN competition called NMUNC. The most recent iteration of NMUNC had over 250 delegates from over 20 schools.

Nueva's mock trial team was founded at the beginning of the 2024–25 school year. Despite being newer, Nueva's mock trial team has been highly successful. In its inaugural year, Nueva narrowly lost to Aragon High School before winning against Hillsdale High, Woodside Priory. Further, it was the winner of two other trials on January 30, 2025. The team expanded to contain a JV team in its second year of competing in the San Mateo County Circuit.

Moreover, Nueva has an Ethics Bowl team. It is a regular competitor at the National High School Ethics Bowl and the Pan American Ethics Olympiad.

=== Athletics ===
Nueva's Niche rating for sports is C+. In January 2023, Brett McCabe was hired as the Director of Athletics and Physical Education. The Lower/Middle School Athletics/P.E. Director is David Burgee, who assumed the role in 2021.

In the Middle School, Nueva offers: Coed Cross Country, Coed Flag Football, Coed Golf, and Coed Swimming in the fall; Boys' Basketball and Girls' Soccer in early winter; Boys' Soccer and Girls' Basketball in late winter; and Coed Track & Field, Coed Tennis, and Girls' Volleyball in the spring.

In the Upper School, Nueva offers: Boys' Cross Country, Girls' Cross Country, Girls' Volleyball, and Girls' Tennis in the fall; Boys' Basketball, Girls' Basketball, Boys' Soccer, and Girls' Soccer in the winter; and Coed Golf, Boys' Swimming & Diving, Girls' Swimming & Diving, Boys' Tennis, Boys' Track & Field, Girls' Track & Field, Boys' Volleyball, and Girls' Beach Volleyball in the spring.

== Campus ==
The lower school was originally located in Menlo Park but now is located on the site of the former W. H. Crocker Skyfarm mansion, which was purchased and donated to the school by the late W. Clement Stone. The school moved to the mansion in 1971.

The remodeled mansion houses the lower school, grades pre-kindergarten to fourth. The middle school and classes for grades five to eight are also located on the Hillsborough campus and include the Hillside Learning Complex, the Cafe, library, and administrative offices that serve the whole school. Other campus facilities include a gymnasium/performance space, science labs, several playgrounds, art studios, and the "forts," a special outdoor play area. There is also the Innovation Lab (I-Lab), a maker-studio space with equipment including 3D printers, laser cutters, and construction tools that students use as part of the design thinking curriculum. The Hillsborough school campus has a gym/multipurpose room known as the GCC where students play sports ranging from basketball to volleyball. Nueva's 42 acre Hillsborough campus is tiered, having the middle school going down into Crocker Mansion, going down into the hiking/forts trail. Nueva's upper field includes a track and two soccer goals, as well as a scoreboard that was installed in 2013.

For the high school, established in 2013, a new campus of 133,000 square feet was built as part of the Bay Meadows development in San Mateo, opening in August 2014. It was designed by Leddy Maytum Stacy Architects. The construction of the campus cost $70 million, which was funded by a capital campaign and by debt. The inaugural ninth grade class was housed at the College of San Mateo while the construction of the high school campus was underway. The campus does not have individual offices for teachers; instead, they have clustered desks in common areas. The high school campus is located near the Hillsdale Caltrain station, which more than half the students use to commute to school.

Nueva's campuses have been recognized for their environmentally conscious design. The upper school campus gets 30% of its electricity from solar panels, using 65% less energy and 50% less water than a typical high school. The middle school campus's library has a living roof with native plants. The upper school campus was the first K-12 building in the United States to receive LEED Gold certification and has received the American Institute of Architects Award for School Design and Sustainability. Nueva was also one of 27 schools in the United States to be named a Green Ribbon School by the U.S. Department of Education in 2021 for its sustainable practices.

== Finances ==
Tuition for the Nueva School ranges from $30,555 for pre-kindergarten to $51,285 for high school, and the school gives around $5.5 million of financial aid per year. This tuition pays for 80% of Nueva's operating costs. Nueva has an endowment of $45 million. Controversially, it also received $2 million of federal loans from the Paycheck Protection Program during the pandemic in 2020.

== Student body ==
=== Demographics ===
According to Niche, there are 853 students at the Nueva School. 51% of students are female and 49% are male. 50.6% are white, 24.7% are Asian, 22% are multiracial, 2.1% are Hispanic, and 0.5% are African American. Nueva adheres to the Beloved Community framework, an "all-embracing, radical idea of unity for the whole human race."

=== Admissions ===
Admission to the school in the eighth grade and below usually involves taking an IQ test: the Wechsler Preschool and Primary Scale of Intelligence, Fourth Edition (WPPSI-IV) for children under six years old, and the Wechsler Intelligence Scale for Children, Fifth Edition (WISC-V) for children six years old and older. The target range for admissions is a score of 130 and above. The admissions process also requires meeting with family, an activity session in a classroom setting, teacher evaluations, transcripts, and standardized test scores.

== Notable alumni ==
- Lisa Brennan-Jobs — writer and daughter of Apple co-founder Steve Jobs
- Jon Fisher — entrepreneur and investor
- Erik Goeddel — former Major League Baseball player and son of American molecular biologist David Goeddel
- Tyler Goeddel — former Major League Baseball player and son of American molecular biologist David Goeddel
- Adam Klein — contestant on the TV show Survivor
- Shemar Moore — actor
- Michaela Shiloh — songwriter and recording artist
- Debby Soo — CEO of OpenTable
- Jesse Thorn — broadcaster (NPR), podcaster and founder of the Maximum Fun podcasting network
