= Goeddel =

Goeddel is a surname. Notable people with the surname include:

- Erik Goeddel (born 1988), American baseball player
- David Goeddel (born 1951), American molecular biologist, father of Erik and Tyler
- Tyler Goeddel (born 1992), American baseball player
