= Karen Hanton =

British businesswoman

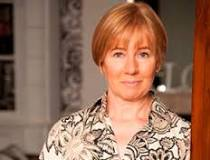
- Occupation: Businesswoman

Karen Hanton MBE is a Scottish entrepreneur, known for founding JustAddRed, Toptable and Mortimer & Spinks.

== Career ==
=== 2015 ===
Hanton founded JustAddRed, an East London incubator.

=== 2000 - 2010 ===
Hanton founded toptable.com, Europe's largest online restaurant booking service, listing over 8000 restaurants in 14 countries. It was bought by the NASDAQ listed Opentable in 2010 for $55M. Sir Alex Ferguson and Gary Rhodes were shareholders in the company, and Hanton was the biggest single shareholder and CEO.

She was awarded an MBE in 2010 for services to the restaurant industry.

=== 1990 - 1996 ===
Hanton founded Mortimer & Spinks, an IT recruitment consulting firm sold in 1996 to Harvey Nash, listed on the FTSE 250.

=== 1974 - 1984 ===
Hanton then worked at The Allders Group, a large, privately owned group (the Lyons family) including 12 department stores and duty-free shops at airports. She was recruited as a trainee in the HR department at William Whiteley's of Bayswater and subsequently joined and completed a general management training course whilst continuing to focus on HR. She held various positions within the group (all HR and Training), culminating in being appointed Head of HR and Training at Allders of Croydon (c2000 staff) at age 25. She left in 1984 to pursue self-employment.

== Awards ==
Hanton has received significant public recognition, including:

- 2015 - Named in the top 50 most inspiring women in tech in Europe
- Financial Times/Moet Hennessy Extraordinary Achievers Award
- Named as one of today's top 30 entrepreneurs in New Business Magazine
- Named one of the top 100 most influential people in the first decade of the internet in an NOP/e-consultancy poll

She was appointed Member of the Order of the British Empire (MBE) in the 2010 Birthday Honours.
