= The Inn at Honey Run =

Boutique hotel in Ohio, USA

Coordinates: 40.5740°N 81.8735°W

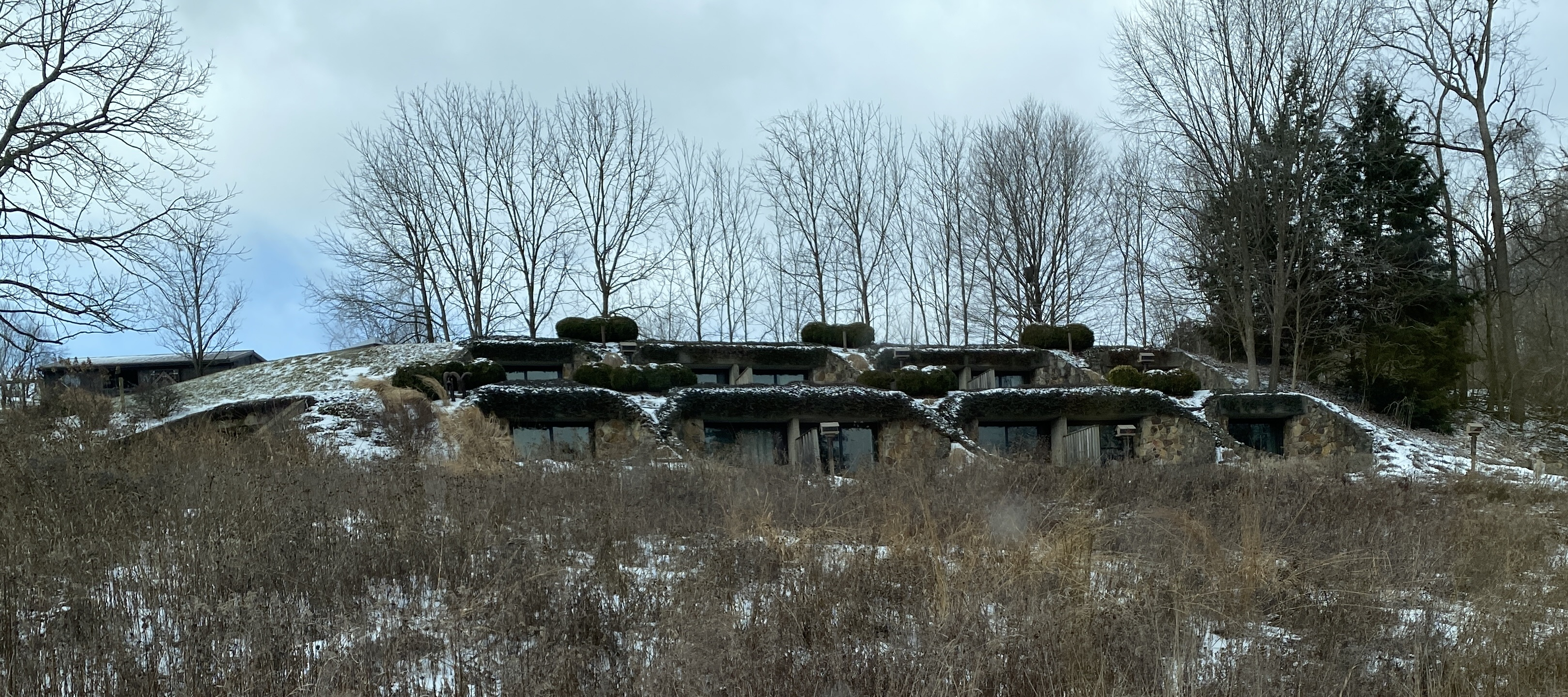
- Honeycomb rooms built into the side of a hill

General information
- Location: 6920 County Road 203, Millersburg, Ohio 44654

Other information
- Number of rooms: 39
- Number of suites: 4
- Number of restaurants: 1
- Number of bars: 1

Website
- www.innathoneyrun.com

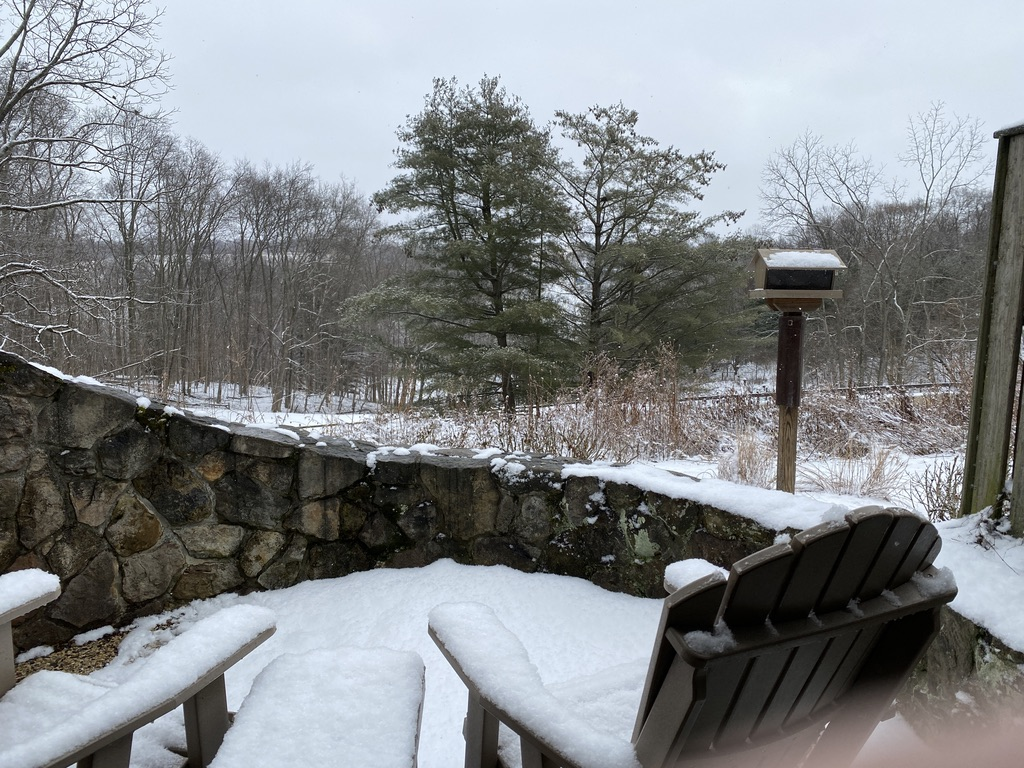
View from patio of honeycomb room at Inn at Honey Run

The Inn at Honey Run is a boutique hotel in Holmes County, Ohio near Millersburg in Ohio's Amish Country.

The hotel consists of a main building housing 25 rooms and suites and a fine-dining restaurant and lounge; 12 "honeycomb" rooms, which are built into the side of a hill on the property a short distance from the main building and have been compared to hobbit holes; and two cottages. All accommodate two people. The hotel is adults-only.

The site covers 56 acres and includes a mile-and-a-half walking trail that accesses ten outdoor art installations and thirty haiku. In 2019 the fossilized tooth of a woolly mammoth was found on the property by a hotel guest.

The hotel was established in 1982 by Marge Stock and Margret Schlicting. It was owned by Phil Jenkins for a time and was purchased by Jason Nies in 2009.

In 2017 Town & Country Magazine wrote that the inn's restaurant, Tarragon, was one of the most scenic in the country according to Open Table.
