= Ness Computing =

Ness Computing was a personal search company. It was acquired by OpenTable in March 2014 and was shut down later that year.

It was founded in October 2009 by Corey Reese, Paul Twohey, Nikhil Raghavan, and Steven Schlansker. The company was headquartered in Los Altos, California.

Ness aimed to help people make decisions about dining, nightlife, entertainment, shopping, music, travel and more. The company referred to its technology as the "Likeness Engine", a combination of a recommendation engine that used machine learning to look at data from diverse sources and a traditional search engine that served up results based on these signals.

The free Ness Dining App (for iPhone) was referred to as the Netflix or Pandora for restaurants. Based on a user's ratings and preferences, the service delivered recommendations for a particular time, location, price range, and cuisine preference. Users could view the menu for a place via SinglePlatform, browse Instagram photos tagged at the restaurant, and make reservations in the app via OpenTable.
