= Lick-Wilmerding High School =

Private high school in San Francisco, California

Coordinates: 37°43′20″N 122°26′56″W

Lick Wilmerding High School
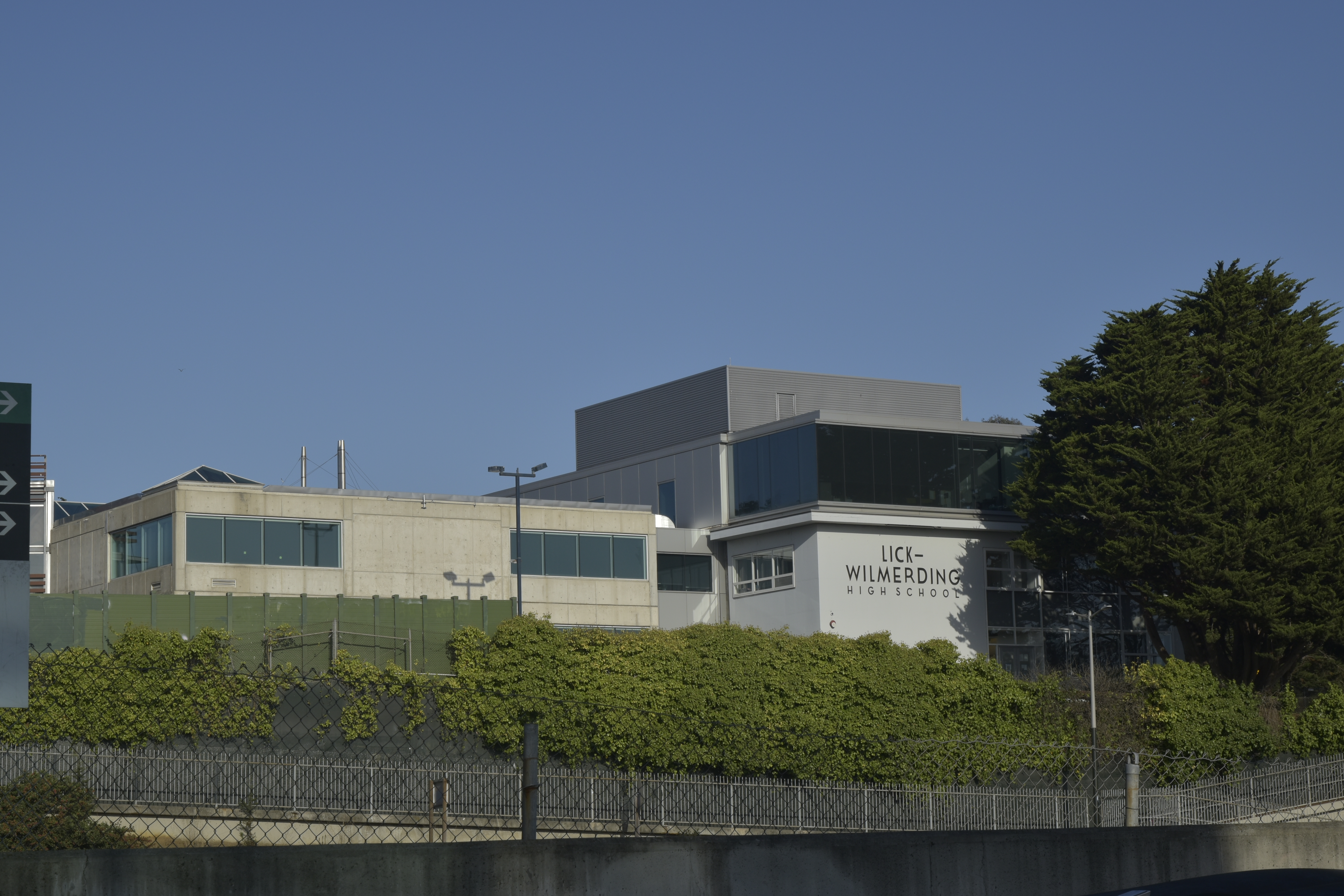
- 755 Ocean Ave, San Francisco, California

Information
- Type: Private
- Motto: A private school with a public purpose
- Established: January 1895; 131 years ago
- Head of school: Raj Mundra
- Faculty: 72
- Grades: 9–12
- Enrollment: 551
- Campus type: Urban
- Colors: Black and gold
- Athletics: 15 sports
- Athletics conference: Bay Counties League West
- Mascot: Tiger
- Newspaper: Paper Tiger
- Annual tuition: $62,250 (2025)
- Website: www.lwhs.org

Lick-Wilmerding High School is a private college-preparatory high school located in San Francisco, California, United States.

== History ==
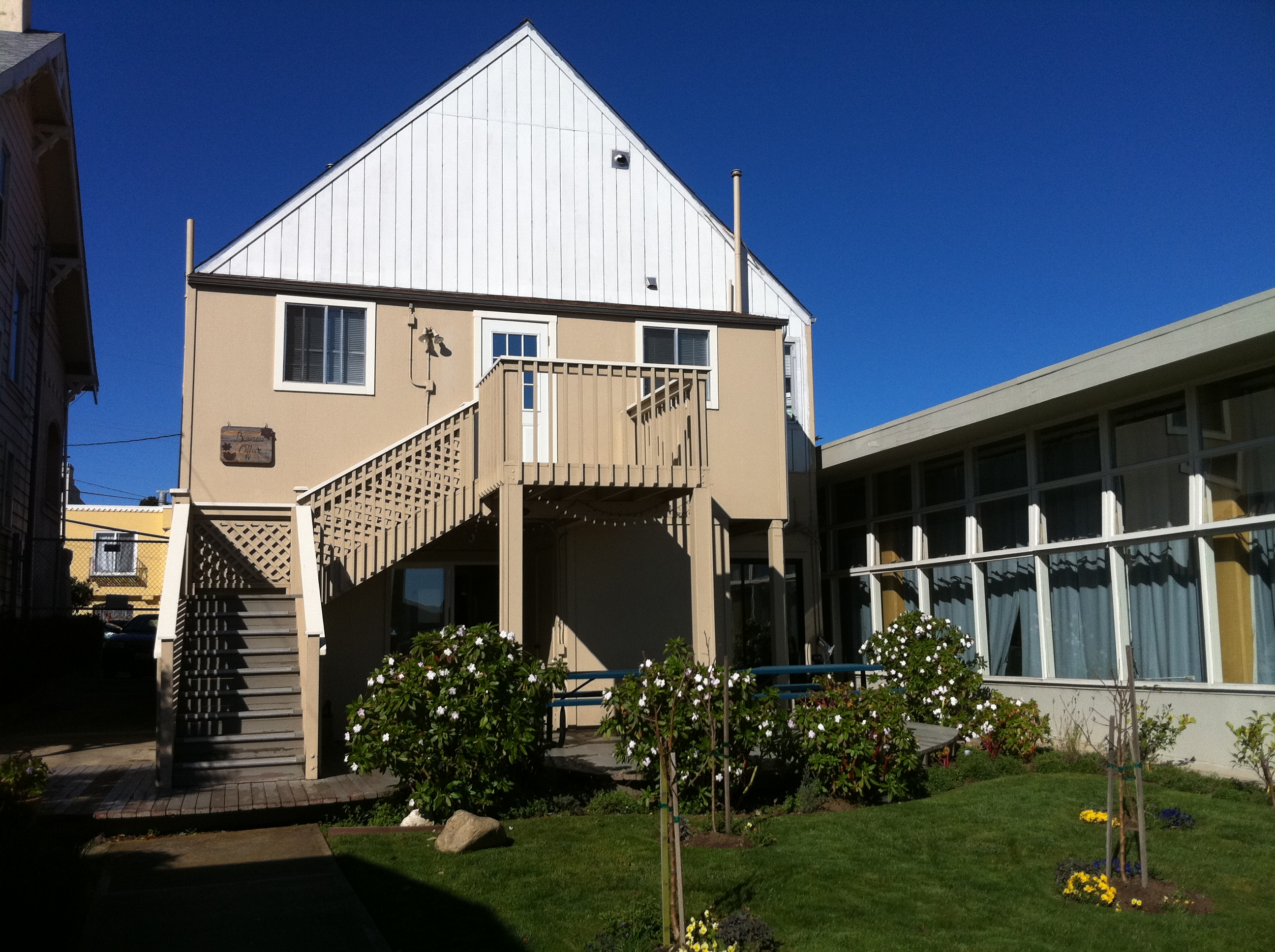
Lick-Wilmerding's Business Office

Lick-Wilmerding High School was founded in January, 1895, as the California School of Mechanical Arts, at Sixteenth and 17th Street and Potrero Avenue and Utah streets, in the Mission District, by a trust from James Lick. George Merrill was hired to manage the school as the first director, and Lick, as the school was informally known, officially opened in January 1895. George Merrill was the director of Lick until 1939, and later also the director of the (Jellis Clute) Wilmerding School of Industrial Arts and the (Miranda) Lux School for Industrial Training for Girls, which were both located immediately adjacent to the Lick campus. In the early 1950s, The California School of Mechanical Arts and the Wilmerding School of Industrial Arts merged to become Lick-Wilmerding High School. The Lux School later closed, and its students joined Lick-Wilmerding. Lick-Wilmerding High School moved to a new campus at 755 Ocean Avenue in 1956.

== Academics ==
=== Curriculum ===
Each student must be enrolled in a minimum of six five‐unit courses per semester, regardless of grade level. A total of 30 units per semester are required. Every student is required to complete four semesters of technical arts courses (such as wood, metal, jewelry, or electronics), one semester of performing arts, and two semesters of visual arts. Additionally, students must complete two semesters of health class (BME), one in freshman year and another in sophomore year. As of 2025, freshmen are required to complete one semester of Identity & Belonging.

Technical courses include Metal, Woodworking, Robotics, Electronics and Jewelry. LWHS also has several year-long Architecture courses and an introduction to design course, entitled Contemporary Media and Art that is compulsory for all freshmen.

LWHS' Performing Arts Department has a choir, jazz band, orchestra, and two a cappella vocal ensembles. There is also a dance program comprising four classes: Dance 1, Dance 2, Dance Ensemble, and Dance Company. The Ehrer Theatre (named after Marcel Roy Ehrer, an American of French and Alsatian origin) Program presents plays, musicals, and a festival of original one-act plays written and directed by students. Theatre class offerings include: Acting 1, Acting Intensive, Improv, Playwriting, Stagecraft, and Directing.

=== Community ===
As of the 2021–2022 school year, the student body is 9% South Asian, 6% Southeast Asian, 11% African-American, 18% Latino, 29% East Asian, and 62% Caucasian. Overall, 35% of the student body identifies as multiethnic, which explains why the sum of these percentages is more than 100%.

=== Test scores ===
In 2014, the Huffington Post reported that students at LWHS had the 8th-highest SAT scores in the nation.

Averages for the class of 2018:

==== ACT ====
- ACT Average Composite 32 (52 takers).

==== SAT Reasoning Test ====
- SAT Average Score: 1420 (85 takers)

==== SAT Subject Tests (and number of test takers) ====
- Biology Ecology: 593 (7)
- Biology Molecular: 645 (2)
- Chemistry: 689 (25)
- Chinese with Listening: 587 (3)
- English Literature: 665 (71)
- French: 651 (10)
- French with Listening: 710 (1)
- Korean with Listening: 800 (1)
- Math Level I: 599 (13)
- Math Level II: 708 (73)
- Physics: 672 (9)
- Spanish: 685 (6)
- Spanish with Listening: 695 (6)
- US History: 595 (6)
- World History: 640 (1)

==== Advanced Placement Scores ====
- In spring of 2018, 38 students took 44 Advanced Placement exams; 93% of the scores 3 or higher

=== Aim High Program ===
Aim High was founded in 1986, with 50 students and 12 teachers, on the campus of Lick-Wilmerding High School in San Francisco.

The program has evolved into a collaboration with several educational institutions: Lick-Wilmerding High School, The Urban School of San Francisco, the San Francisco Unified School District and St. Paul's Episcopal School. Additional partners include the Bay Area Teachers Center, the Golden Gate National Recreation Area and the Exploratorium."

== Extracurricular activities ==
=== Technical Arts Courses ===
The following courses were available during the 2021–22 school year.

- 3D-Printing and Parametric Design
- Circuits and Electronics: Analog and Digital
- Circuits and Electronics: Device Invention
- Community Computing PPP
- Design & Technology
- Graphics and Game Design (formerly Computing 1)
- Jewelry 1
- Jewelry 2
- Private Skills for a Public Purpose (PPP)
- Rethinking Furniture
- Sewing and Textile Arts Level 1
- Sewing and Textile Arts Level 2 PPP
- Wood: Joinery and Turning

=== Athletics ===
- Fall Teams:
  - Boys and Girls Cross Country
  - Girls Varsity, Junior Varsity and Frosh/Soph Volleyball
  - Girls Varsity and Junior Varsity Tennis
  - Girls Varsity Field Hockey
  - Boys and Girls Water Polo
  - Flag Football
  - Sailing (Club)
- Winter Teams:
  - Boys Varsity, Junior Varsity, and Frosh/Soph Basketball
  - Girls Varsity, Junior Varsity, and Frosh/Soph Basketball
  - Boys Varsity, Junior Varsity, and Frosh/Soph Soccer
  - Girls Varsity and Junior Varsity Soccer
  - Boys and Girls Wrestling
- Spring Teams:
  - Boys and Girls Track and Field
  - Boys and Girls Badminton
  - Boys Varsity and Junior Varsity Lacrosse
  - Girls Varsity and Junior Varsity Lacrosse
  - Boys Varsity Baseball
  - Girls Varsity Softball
  - Boys and Girls Varsity and Junior Varsity Swimming
  - Boys Varsity and Junior Varsity Tennis
- Former
  - Rugby

=== Awards ===
Alternet.com has also designated Lick-Wilmerding as the 6th top high school in the United States utilizing Green Architecture

==== California Music Education Association Honors ====
- Chamber Singers: Unanimous Superior, 2004, 2005, 2006, 2007.
- Big Band: Unanimous Excellent, two years running, and Unanimous Superior, two years before.
- Advanced Jazz Combo: Unanimous Superior, for four years
- Orchestra: Unanimous Superior, for one year

==== Anaheim Heritage Festival Honors ====
- 2004: Chamber Singers and Chamber Orchestra: Gold

== Notable alumni ==
- Andres Amador, artist
- Dan the Automator, DJ/Producer
- John Lane Bell, mathematician and philosopher
- Nathan Chan, Assistant Principal Cello, Seattle Symphony
- Wayne M. Collins, civil rights attorney
- John D. Goldman, philanthropist (class of '67)
- Luca Iaconi-Stewart, model aircraft builder
- Jonathon Keats, conceptual artist
- Rafael Mandelman, attorney, politician, and current member of the San Francisco Board of Supervisors
- Gerek Meinhardt, fencer at the 2008 Summer Olympics, youngest American Olympian fencer
- mxmtoon, Singer-songwriter
- Albert Overhauser, National Medal of Science winner (class of '42)
- Lionel Pries, University of Washington faculty member and noted Seattle architect
- Harold W. Roberts, WWI Congressional Medal of Honor recipient
- Ned Segal, businessperson
- Frederick Seitz, physicist, National Medal of Science winner
- Debby Soo — CEO of OpenTable
- Teresa Strasser, radio and television personality, writer
- Laura Sullivan, Investigative Correspondent for NPR, winner of three Peabody Awards
- Francis Tapon, author, public speaker, global nomad
- Peter J. Weber, architectural designer, works include portions of Mission Inn, Riverside, California
- Benjamin Wildman-Tobriner, 2008 Gold Medal Olympic swimmer and former world record holder
- Sam Mihara, Japanese-American writer and educator incarcerated during the Second World War

== See also ==
- San Francisco County high schools
