= Sneaky Sunday =

Sneaky Sunday LLC
- Type: Private
- Founded: 2006
- Fate: defunct
- Headquarters: Atlanta, GA, USA
- Key people: Paul Broft (CEO), Dean Roland (CSO), Cary Franklin (COO), Christopher Tuff (CMO), John Davis (CCO), Jason Williams (CTO)
- Products: Recommendations and Rankings
- Website: www.SneakySunday.com

Sneaky Sunday was an Atlanta-based nightlife and entertainment review website that hosted recommendations for bars, clubs, restaurants, hotels, leisure activities and live entertainment venues in over 90 U.S. cities. The founders describe their target audience as "young professionals." As of January 25, 2013, Sneaky Sunday is no longer online.

== Features ==
Sneaky Sunday has an online database of recommendations and rankings of over 50 categories of local restaurants, bars, music venues, and hotels in over 90 major U.S. cities. Visitors to the site choose their city of interest and navigate through four main categories: bars/clubs, restaurants, live entertainment, and hotels/leisure. Each category is broken out into sub-categories that contain recommendations for only the best venues within a category (i.e. Best Dive Bar, Best Beer Selection, etc.).

Other site features include a daily events calendar in every city with listings for the next 30 days of all major local events within music, sports, live theater, art, comedy, dance, and special events. Each venue can also feature maps, user reviews, short-form video (SneakySunday TV), and SMS messaging. Visitors have the ability to make restaurant reservations through OpenTable .com as well.

== History ==
The idea for Sneaky Sunday was born in 2006 when Paul Broft (CEO), Collective Soul guitarist Dean Roland and Cary Franklin (COO) were at a sports bar and noticed it was unusually crowded for a Sunday. They realized people frequently ventured out on "school nights" but didn't necessarily know where to go on untraditional nights thus Sneaky Sunday was born. Introduced online and tested with 20 U.S. cities beginning in August 2007, an expanded site covering more than 90 cities re-launched on April 1, 2008. "Think of it as GPS for your social life," commented The Atlantan magazine.

As of January 25, 2013, Sneaky Sunday is no longer online.
