= Christa Quarles =

American business executive

- Born: United States
- Occupation: Business executive
- Employer: Alludo
- Known for: CEO of Alludo, former CEO of OpenTable
- Title: Chief executive officer
- Term: 2020–present
- Board member of: Kimberly-Clark; Affirm Holdings, Inc.

Christa Quarles is an American business executive. She has been chief executive officer (CEO) of Alludo (formerly Corel) since September 2020. Quarles previously was CEO of the restaurant‑reservation platform OpenTable. Before that, she was chief business officer (CBO) at the neighborhood social network Nextdoor and held senior executive roles in the Walt Disney Company and the social‑gaming startup Playdom.

== Early life and education ==
Quarles was raised in Pittsburgh, Pennsylvania.

== Career ==
In July 2014, Quarles joined Nextdoor as chief business officer. She reported to chief executive Nirav Tolia and oversaw business development, human resources, legal, and finance functions. Quarles joined OpenTable in May 2015 as chief financial officer and was appointed permanent CEO in November that year by the Priceline Group. At the 2017 Fortune Brainstorm Tech conference, she dismissed claims that women in technology lack mutual support, describing them as "bullshit," and encouraged stronger networks among women in the sector. Later that year, after Booking Holdings placed OpenTable under the leadership of Kayak CEO Steve Hafner, Quarles announced she would step down at the end of 2018.

In September 2020, private-equity firm KKR appointed Quarles CEO of Corel, later rebranded as Alludo. Quarles has emphasised recurring revenue, in-house customer support, and product cohesion.

She has also been on the boards of Kimberly‑Clark Corporation, is the lead independent director for the fintech company Affirm Inc, and was a non‑editorial co‑chair of Fortune’s Brainstorm Tech conference in 2019.

== Personal life ==
Christa Quarles has two children.
