= Chuck Templeton =

American Internet entrepreneur (born 1968)

- Education: California Polytechnic State University; Northwestern University Kellogg School of Management
- Occupations: Managing Partner at S2G; Founder and former CEO of OpenTable; Investment Committee Member at Impact Engine

Chuck Templeton is an American entrepreneur and the founder of OpenTable, where he previously was CEO. He is a managing partner at S2G Investments, focusing on investments in food, agriculture, oceans, and energy. He is on the advisory board of Impact Engine and is involved with several startup boards.

== Education and early life ==
Templeton, originally from Lafayette, California, started his career as a United States Army Ranger. He holds a Bachelor of Science in Environmental Economics from California Polytechnic State University and a Master of Business Administration from Northwestern University’s Kellogg School of Management.

== Career ==
=== OpenTable ===
Templeton is the founder of OpenTable, an online restaurant-reservation service. The idea for OpenTable developed in 1998 when Templeton’s in-laws came to town for a visit. Templeton's father-in-law is Lettuce Entertain You founding partner Bob Wattel, and the dining selections for the Wattels' visit were so important that Templeton recalled his wife spending 3 1/2 hours on the phone trying to secure reservations.

=== GrubHub ===
Templeton was the founding chairman and an advisor for GrubHub, now GrubHub Seamless, which went public in April of 2014.

=== OhSoWe.com ===
In 2004, Templeton co-founded OhSoWe.com, a site that allowed neighbors to trade or rent items like tools or sporting equipment among each other.

=== Impact Engine ===
Templeton is an investment committee member at Impact Engine.

=== S2G Investments ===
In 2014, Templeton co-founded S2G Investments, a multi-stage investment firm focused on venture and growth-stage businesses across food & agriculture, oceans, and energy.

== Board memberships ==
Templeton has been a board member of Juhl Energy, Inc. since April 2014.

He was a board member of Piece & Co., Inc., which promoted sustainable employment for women in developing countries through the sale of handmade fabrics to high end designers. He was a board member of ThinkCERCA, Inc., a literacy and critical thinking software company. He was a board member of Getable, Inc.

== Honors and recognition ==
- Forbes Sustainability Leaders 2024
- Crain’s Tech 50 2015
- Built In Chicago startup hub's Moxie Mentor of the Year 2014
- 2014 Hall of Fame Inductee - Distinguished Restaurants of North America
- Crain’s Tech 50 2013
- Moxie Mentor of the Year 2013
- Crain’s Tech 50 2012
- The Executives Club of Chicago Innovation Award to Impact Engine 2013
- 2011 Alumni Entrepreneur Innovator Award from the Larry and Carol Levy Institute for Entrepreneurial Practice

== Personal life ==
Templeton is married to Julie Templeton and they have two daughters. He is an avid runner.
