= Jefferson Lecture =

Honorary lecture series

- Awarded for: Distinguished intellectual achievement in humanities
- Location: Washington, D.C.
- Country: United States
- Presented by: National Endowment for the Humanities
- First award: 1972
- Website: neh.gov/about/awards/jefferson-lecture

The Jefferson Lecture in the Humanities is an honorary lecture series established in 1972 by the National Endowment for the Humanities (NEH). According to the NEH, the Lecture is "the highest honor the federal government confers for distinguished intellectual achievement in the humanities."

== History of the Jefferson Lecture ==
The Jefferson Lecturer is selected each year by the National Council on the Humanities, the 26-member citizen advisory board of the NEH. The honoree delivers a lecture in Washington, D.C., generally in conjunction with the spring meeting of the council, and receives an honorarium of $10,000. The stated purpose of the honor is to recognize "an individual who has made significant scholarly contributions in the humanities and who has the ability to communicate the knowledge and wisdom of the humanities in a broadly appealing way."

The first Jefferson Lecturer, in 1972, was Lionel Trilling. He spoke on "Mind in the Modern World." Among other things, Trilling suggested that humanism had become the basis for social improvement, rather than science and the scientific method as has been predicted by Thomas Jefferson, the Lectures' namesake. Ten years later, Gerald Holton, the first scientist invited to deliver the lecture, drew attention for responding to Trilling, proposing that Jefferson's vision of science as a force for social improvement was still viable, opining that there had been a "relocation of the center of gravity" of scientific inquiry toward solving society's important problems, and cautioning that science education had to be improved dramatically or only a small "technological elite" would be equipped to take part in self-government.

The selection of the 2000 Jefferson Lecturer led to a spate of controversy. The initial selection was President Bill Clinton. William R. Ferris, chairman of the NEH, said that his intent was to establish a new tradition for every president to deliver a Jefferson Lecture during his or her presidency, and that this was consistent with the NEH's broader effort to increase public awareness of the humanities. However, some scholars and political opponents objected that the choice of Clinton represented an inappropriate and unprecedented politicization of the NEH. The heads of the American Council of Learned Societies and the National Humanities Alliance expressed concerns about introducing political considerations into the selection, while William J. Bennett, a conservative Republican and former chairman of the NEH under President Ronald Reagan, charged that the proposal was an example of how Clinton had "corrupted all of those around him." In the wake of the controversy, President Clinton declined the honor; a White House spokesperson said the President "didn't want the work of the National Endowment for the Humanities to be called into question."

Ultimately the 2000 honor went to historian James M. McPherson, whose lecture turned out to be very popular. Subsequently, the NEH revised the criteria for the award to place more emphasis on speaking skills and public appeal.

The next Jefferson Lecture, by playwright Arthur Miller, again led to attacks from conservatives such as Jay Nordlinger, who called it "a disgrace," and George Will, who did not like the political content of Miller's lecture and argued that Miller was not legitimately a "scholar."

Recent Jefferson Lecturers have included journalist/author Tom Wolfe; Straussian conservative political philosopher Harvey Mansfield; and novelist John Updike, who, in a nod to the NEH's Picturing America arts initiative, devoted his 2008 lecture to the subject of American art. In his 2009 lecture, bioethicist and self-described "humanist" Leon Kass expressed his view that science has become separated from its humanistic origins, and the humanities have lost their connection to metaphysical and theological concerns.

In 2013 the NEH went in a different direction, selecting film director Martin Scorsese. He was the first filmmaker chosen for the honor, and he spoke on "the evolution of his films, the art of storytelling, and the inspiration he draws from the humanities". In 2014 the Jefferson Lecturer was author Walter Isaacson, and the 2015 honoree was playwright and actress Anna Deavere Smith. As part of the NEH's celebration of its fiftieth anniversary in 2016, it selected documentarian Ken Burns to deliver the lecture. The 2017 lecturer was University of Chicago philosophy and law professor Martha Nussbaum, who delivered her lecture, entitled "Powerlessness and the Politics of Blame", on May 1, 2017.

== Publications based on Jefferson Lectures ==
A number of the Jefferson Lectures have led to books, including Holton's The Advancement of Science, and Its Burdens, John Hope Franklin's Racial Equality in America, Henry Louis Gates' The Trials of Phillis Wheatley and Jaroslav Pelikan's The Vindication of Tradition. Updike's 2008 lecture was included in his posthumous 2012 collection Always Looking.

Bernard Lewis' 1990 lecture on "Western Civilization: A View from the East" was revised and reprinted in The Atlantic Monthly under the title "The Roots of Muslim Rage". According to one source, Lewis' lecture (and the subsequent article) first introduced the term "Islamic fundamentalism" to North America.

== List of Jefferson Lecturers ==
The following table lists the Jefferson Lecturers and the titles of their lectures.

Year	Lecturer	Lecture Title
1972	Lionel Trilling	"Mind in the Modern World"
1973	Erik Erikson	"Dimensions of a New Identity"
1974	Robert Penn Warren	"Poetry and Democracy"
1975	Paul A. Freund	"Liberty: The Great Disorder of Speech"
1976	John Hope Franklin	"Racial Equality in America"
1977	Saul Bellow	"The Writer and His Country Look Each Other Over"
1978	C. Vann Woodward	"The European Vision of America"
1979	Edward Shils	"Render Unto Caesar: Government, Society, and Universities in their Reciprocal Rights and Duties"
1980	Barbara Tuchman	"Mankind's Better Moments"
1981	Gerald Holton	"Where is Science Taking Us?"
1982	Emily Vermeule	"Greeks and Barbarians: The Classical Experience in the Larger World"
1983	Jaroslav Pelikan	"The Vindication of Tradition"
1984	Sidney Hook	"Education in Defense of a Free Society"
1985	Cleanth Brooks	"Literature in a Technological Age"
1986	Leszek Kołakowski	"The Idolatry of Politics"
1987	Forrest McDonald	"The Intellectual World of the Founding Fathers"
1988	Robert Nisbet	"The Present Age and the State of Community"
1989	Walker Percy	"The Fateful Rift: The San Andreas Fault in the Modern Mind"
1990	Bernard Lewis	"Western Civilization: A View from the East"
1991	Gertrude Himmelfarb	"Of Heroes, Villains and Valets"
1992	Bernard Knox	"The Oldest Dead White European Males"
1993	Robert Conquest	"History, Humanity and Truth"
1994	Gwendolyn Brooks	"Family Pictures"
1995	Vincent Scully	"The Architecture of Community"
1996	Toni Morrison	"The Future of Time"
1997	Stephen Toulmin	"A Dissenter's Story"
1998	Bernard Bailyn	"To Begin the World Anew: Politics and the Creative Imagination"
1999	Caroline Walker Bynum	"Shape and Story: Some Thoughts About Werewolves"
2000	James M. McPherson	"'For a Vast Future Also': Lincoln and the Millennium"
2001	Arthur Miller	"On Politics and the Art of Acting"
2002	Henry Louis Gates Jr.	"Mr. Jefferson and the Trials of Phillis Wheatley"
2003	David McCullough	"The Course of Human Events"
2004	Helen Vendler	"The Ocean, the Bird, and the Scholar"
2005	Donald Kagan	"In Defense of History"
2006	Tom Wolfe	"The Human Beast"
2007	Harvey Mansfield	"How to Understand Politics: What the Humanities Can Say to Science"
2008	John Updike	"The Clarity of Things: What Is American about American Art"
2009	Leon Kass	"'Looking for an Honest Man': Reflections of an Unlicensed Humanist"
2010	Jonathan Spence	"When Minds Met: China and the West in the Seventeenth Century"
2011	Drew Gilpin Faust	"Telling War Stories: Reflections of a Civil War Historian"
2012	Wendell Berry	"It All Turns on Affection"
2013	Martin Scorsese	"Persistence of Vision: Reading the Language of Cinema"
2014	Walter Isaacson	"The Intersection of the Humanities and the Sciences"
2015	Anna Deavere Smith	"On the Road: A Search for American Character"
2016	Ken Burns	Race in America (subject; no title announced)
2017	Martha Nussbaum	"Powerlessness and the Politics of Blame"
2018	Rita Charon	"To See the Suffering: The Humanities Have What Medicine Needs"
2019	Columba Stewart	"Cultural Heritage Present and Future: A Benedictine Monk's Long View"
2022	Andrew Delbanco	"The Question of Reparations: Our Past, Our Present, Our Future"
2023	Ruth Simmons	"Facing History to Find a Better Future"

- 2024/5 - Sam Mihara
- 2026 - Ruth R. Wisse
