= Toptable =

Online restaurant booker

Toptable logo

Toptable (styled toptable) was an online restaurant booker covering the UK as well as major cities in Europe and New York City established in 2000 and bought by OpenTable in 2010.

== History ==
Toptable was founded in 2000 by entrepreneur Karen Hanton for restaurant owners to advertise their venues and book customers directly. Toptable sat over 1.5 million diners in 2006 when it completed its first full year.

Toptable lists more than 5,000 restaurants in the UK, plus Paris, Dublin, and New York City, providing online menus, reviews and 360° images of each restaurant. Diners were able to read and compare information about restaurants before their table booking online. At its peak, 2.3 million visitors viewed the Toptable website each month and, in February 2010, a dedicated Toptable iPhone app was launched.

A toptable Android app was available as of Sep 2013

Toptable also provided a restaurant booking engine for Time Out, British Airways, The Guardian, The Times Online, Visit London and View London.

In 2006 toptable bought City Eating, incorporating London Eating for an undisclosed sum.

Investors in Toptable included football manager Sir Alex Ferguson, celebrity chef Gary Rhodes and Diageo. In September 2010, toptable was acquired by competitor OpenTable for approximately US$55 million.
