= Sam Mihara =

American writer and educator (born 1933)

Sam Mihara (born February 1, 1933) is an American writer and history educator who is a survivor of the incarceration of Japanese Americans.

== Early life and education ==
Mihara is a second generation Japanese American who was born in Japantown, San Francisco, California in the early 1930s. He is an American citizen by birth. Prior to his family's incarceration, his father worked as a journalist.

Following the start of World War II, Mihara was imprisoned at the age of 9 along with over 120,000 Japanese Americans to move to concentration camps by President Franklin D. Roosevelt's Executive Order 9066. His family was moved to Heart Mountain, a prison camp located in a remote area of Wyoming, where they were imprisoned for three years. At the camp, his family was forced to live in a 20 square foot room.

Following the war, the Mihara family moved home to San Francisco. He graduated from Lick Wilmerding High School. Then, he studied at the University of California, Berkeley, graduating in 1956 with a bachelor's in engineering. He then pursued graduate school, attending the University of California, Los Angeles for his master's degree.

== Engineering career ==
While at UCLA, Mihara was hired by the Douglas Aircraft Company in Santa Monica which was the start of a 42-year career at the company. While at Douglas, he served in various roles including as staff director for the Delta II rocket program. He continued to work for the company after its acquisition by Boeing eventually becoming a key executive for the company.

== History educator and writing career ==
Since he started speaking about the incarceration, over 95,000 people have heard his presentations in person. His work has been self-funded and by various grants.

He is the author of Blindsided: The Life and Times of Sam Mihara, an autobiography which describes his family's experience with Japanese American incarceration.

== Awards ==
Mihara has received a number of awards for his work documenting the incarceration. In 2022, he received the Japanese American of the Biennium Award for Education and Humanities from the Japanese American Citizens League. In 2023, he was the winner of the Salem Award for Human Rights and Social Justice from Voices Against Injustice at The House of the Seven Gables.

He is a member of the board of the Heart Mountain Wyoming Foundation.

- 51st Jefferson Lecture in the Humanities (2025)
