= Debby Soo =

CEO of OpenTable

- Born: 1980 or 1981 (age 45–46)
- Education: MBA
- Alma mater: Stanford University, MIT
- Occupation: Business executive
- Employer: OpenTable

Debby Soo is an American business executive serving since 2020 as the CEO of OpenTable, a global online restaurant-reservation service. She has overseen the company’s operations during a period of significant change in the restaurant industry, particularly in response to the COVID-19 pandemic.

== Early life and education ==
Soo was born in Daly City, California into a blue collar family. Her parents, Ken and Carol Soo, who had immigrated from Taiwan on a lottery visa in the early 1980s, raised her in a two-bedroom apartment with her maternal grandparents and a maternal aunt and uncle. She was an only child.

Soo's father worked as a group tour guide for Taiwanese tourists to the US, and then her parents started a travel agency that specialized in such tours. Her father worked primarily in Asia and her mother managed the business in the US. The agency became successful and the family moved to Foster City and then to Hillsborough. She attended Nueva School and Lick-Wilmerding High School. She graduated from Stanford University with a major in East Asian studies. During her undergraduate work at Stanford, she interned in Hong Kong for Deutsche Bank. She has an MBA degree from MIT's Sloan School of Management. In 2010, during her MBA, she interned for Estée Lauder.

== Career ==
Soo first worked in investment banking. She worked for Citibank and Google Maps.

Soo became an intern at Kayak. In 2013 she was the senior director of new markets. By 2015, Soo was the head of the company's Asia Pacific division. She eventually became CCO.

Soo became CEO of OpenTable in the summer of 2020 during the COVID-19 pandemic's disruption of the restaurant industry worldwide. She pivoted the business model from focussing on diners to focussing on restaurants as the company's primary customer and created partnerships with Visa and JPMorgan Chase. She refocussed the company's software on providing restaurants information about diners such as previous dishes ordered, birthdays, anniversaries, and social media profiles. According to Bloomberg Businessweek, the company showed revenue growth in the double digits in 2025 and had quadrupled its share price from 2020.

== Personal life ==
As of 2026 Soo lived in Hillsborough, California. She is married and has two sons. She speaks Chinese.
