= Andres Amador =

American artist

Andres Amador is an American artist, known for his large-scale organic sand drawings.

== Early years ==
Amador grew up in San Francisco, California, graduating from Lick-Wilmerding High School, and received a BA in Environmental Science. He joined the Peace Corps and became a computer technician. In 1999, he made a visit to the Burning Man, an experience that led him to quit his job and start a new career.

== Career ==
Amador was drawn to ancient geometric art after studying crop circle reconstructions. In 2004, while at Kalalau Beach on the Hawaiian island of Kaua', Amador had been showing a friend the geometric art he had been studying by drawing them in the sand with stick, when he realized that he could create his own large designs in the sand. His first creation was in 2004 at Ocean Beach, San Francisco.

Amador has since created hundreds of artistic drawings on around 30 beaches throughout the United States, Mexico and the Channel Islands. His work usually takes no more than two hours to create and is done with tools similar to rakes. He creates commissioned work and installations for businesses and individuals across the US and Europe, and also hosts Playa Painting Workshops where participants collaborate to design and create their own sand artwork.
