= Luca Iaconi-Stewart =

American designer (born 1991)

Luca Iaconi-Stewart (born around 1991) is an American designer who achieved widespread publicity in 2014 for building a 1/60-scale model of an Air India Boeing 777 using manila folders.

Iaconi-Stewart began work on the model while a junior at San Francisco's Lick-Wilmerding High School in the late 2000s. He claimed it took 10,000 hours to complete and that he devoted an entire summer just to completing construction of the passenger seats. CNET declared the model "the coolest paper airplane ever" while WIRED named Iaconi-Stewart "the world's best paper plane maker". According to Iaconi-Stewart, he dropped out of college at Vassar in order to devote more time to constructing the model. In an interview with The Independent, Iaconi-Stewart said his work had been inspired by an effort to "push the limits of what could be done" with manila folders.

As of 2014, Iaconi-Stewart is employed doing odd jobs in the San Francisco area.

== See also ==
- Model aircraft
- Paper plane
