= Nathan Chan =

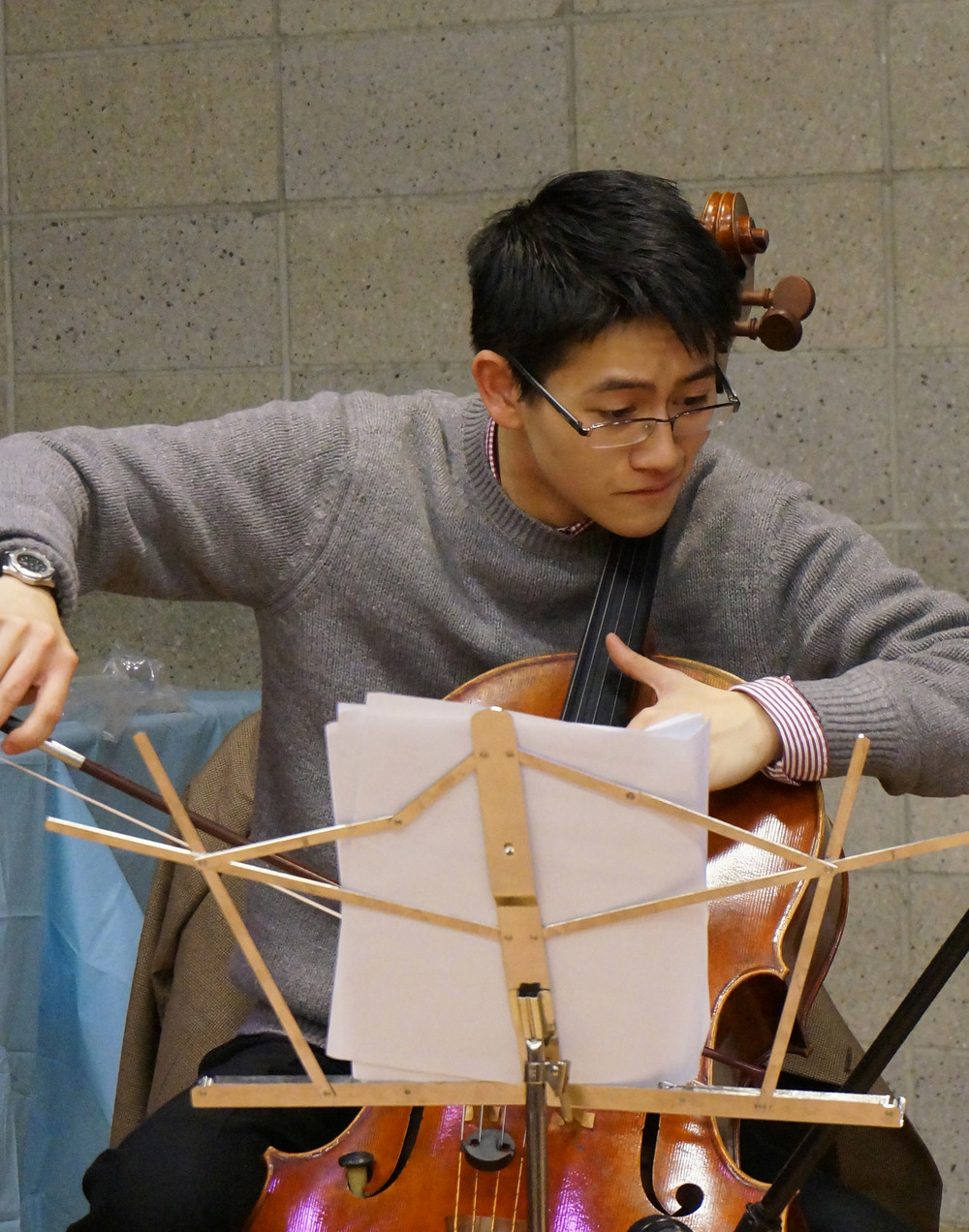
- Nathan Chan playing with String Theory at Columbia University

Background information
- Born: October 22, 1993 (age 32); San Mateo, California
- Genres: Classical
- Occupation: Assistant Principal Cello of the Seattle Symphony
- Instrument: Cello
- Website: nathanchan.com

Nathan Chan (born 1993) is an American cellist from Hillsborough, CA. He has performed with the San Francisco Symphony, The Royal Philharmonic Orchestra, and the Albany Symphony Orchestra, among others.He was featured in the HBO Show, "The Music in Me: Children's Recitals From Classical to Latin to Jazz to Zydeco" as well as Channel 4's "The World's Greatest Musical Prodigies".

== Early life and education ==
Chan was born in San Mateo, CA to a musical family. His parents, Samuel Chan and Rena Ling, both play instruments, and his mother is a pianist and alumnus of the Juilliard School. His sister, J. Clara Chan, is a violist in the Barnard College Manhattan School of Music Exchange Program. Chan began his musical career as a conductor at the age of three. Herbert von Karajan, Leonard Bernstein and Seiji Ozawa were some of his biggest inspirers and heroes. His talent attracted the attention of San Francisco Opera assistant conductor Sara Jobin, who helped Chan make his debut as a conductor at age three, leading the San Jose Chamber Orchestra in a set of Mozart variations.

Chan went to Crocker Middle School in Hillsborough, CA, where he joined the band and learned to play the alto saxophone. He later attended Lick-Wilmerding High School in San Francisco, CA. At this time, he began his studies with San Francisco Conservatory teacher Sieun Lin, and was a member in the San Francisco Symphony Youth Orchestra. Chan attended Columbia University as a student of the Columbia-Juilliard Exchange Program, where he studied with Richard Aaron. Chan was the winner of the 2013 Juilliard Cello Concerto Competition playing the work Don Quixote by Richard Strauss, and received the 2012 Davidson Fellowship for his work, "The Importance of Passion". He graduated from Columbia University in 2014 as a student of the Columbia-Juilliard Exchange with a Bachelor's degree in Economics and from The Juilliard School with a Master of Music degree.

== Career ==
Chan has soloed with orchestras including the San Francisco Symphony, San Francisco Chamber Orchestra, the Royal Philharmonic, the UK Northern Sinfonia, Albany Symphony Orchestra, Marin Symphony, Hong Kong Chamber Orchestra, and The Juilliard Orchestra. Chan has also made many appearances on public radio and TV including NPR’s From The Top, NPR’s Performance Today with Fred Child, and HBO’s "The Music in Me: Children's Recitals From Classical to Latin to Jazz to Zydeco". These collaborations attracted the attention of singer Roberta Flack, who asked Chan to record for her Beatles tribute album, "Let It Be Roberta". In 2009, he was featured in a British documentary entitled "The World’s Greatest Musical Prodigies". Chan has premiered works including the Velesslavista Quadruple Concerto, composed by Alexander Prior, and Double Concerto for Clarinet and Cello, composed by Jonathan Russell. Chan is also a co-founder of the cello ensemble String Theory at Columbia University, with whom he traveled to Arizona to perform at Google’s 2013 Zeitgeist conference. Chan recently joined the Seattle Symphony as their Assistant Principal Cello.

== Advocacy and personality ==
=== Social media ===
Nathan Chan is a strong advocate of using music and technology as a way to inspire others. Chan wishes to use social media to "reintroduce the friendliness and approachability to classical music". Chan has made music videos that combine both classical and pop genres of music in order to attract a wider audience.

Chan's playing style is said to be emotive, passionate and youthful.

Chan uploads music related videos onto YouTube, Instagram and TikTok.

=== Instruments ===
Chan plays on a 2006 Joseph Grubaugh and Sigrun Seifert cello made in Petaluma, CA and the ex-Janos Starker bow made in 1850 by Joseph Henry (bow maker). He previously played a 7/8ths cello made in 1756 by Domenico Busan.
