= ThinkCERCA =

ThinkCERCA is a Chicago-based startup company that produces literacy courseware for elementary through high school students. The company has undergone various rounds of venture capital funding.

== Leadership ==
Eileen Murphy Buckley serves as Founder and CEO.
