= David Goeddel =

American molecular biologist (born 1951)

David V. Goeddel (born 1951) is an American molecular biologist who, employed at the time by Genentech, successfully used genetic engineering to coax bacteria into creating synthetic human insulin, human growth hormone, and human tissue plasminogen activator (tPA) for use in therapeutic medicine.

Recruited by Bob Swanson in 1978, he was the first non-university scientist to be hired at Genentech, and the company's third employee. Goeddel became legendary in the biotechnology and molecular biology fields by cloning virtually all of Genentech's early products and/or processes, including synthetic insulin, growth hormone, and tPA, often beating out bigger and more established laboratories in the process.

Together with Steve McKnight and Robert Tjian, he founded Tularik in 1991, and was their president and CEO until Tularik was acquired by Amgen for $1.3 billion in 2004.

Goeddel earned his bachelor's degree in chemistry from the University of California, San Diego, and his PhD in biochemistry from the University of Colorado, Boulder. He is a member of the National Academy of Sciences, and is a recipient of the Eli Lilly Award in Biological Chemistry and the Scheele Award from the Swedish Academy of Pharmaceutical Sciences.

== Personal life ==
Goeddel has two sons who have played Major League Baseball, Erik and Tyler.
