= Tyler Goeddel =

American baseball player (born 1992)

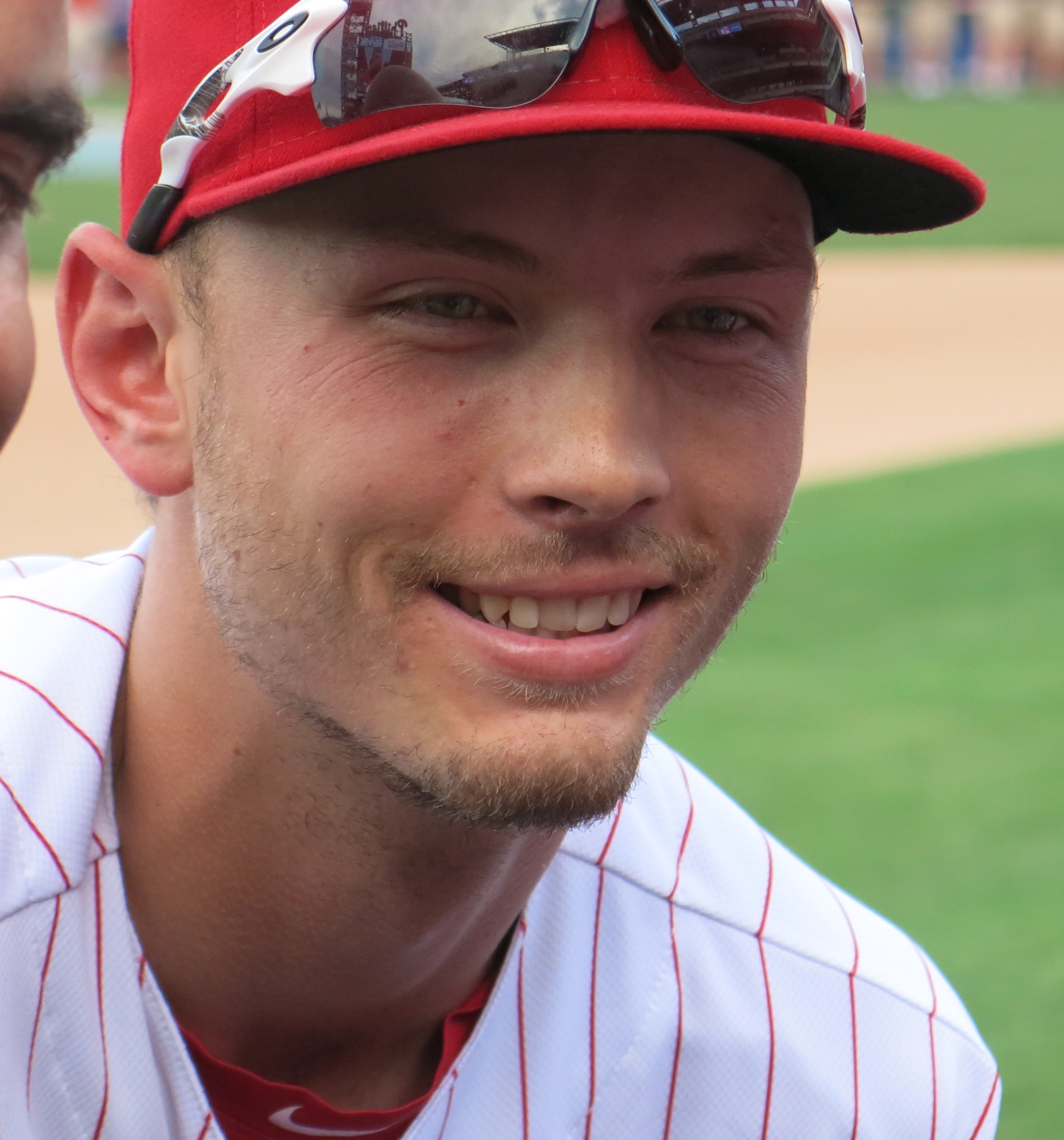
- Goeddel with the Phillies in 2016
- Outfielder
- Born: October 20, 1992 (age 33); Hillsborough, California, U.S.
- Batted: Right Threw: Right

MLB debut
- April 6, 2016, for the Philadelphia Phillies

Last MLB appearance
- September 21, 2016, for the Philadelphia Phillies

MLB statistics
- Batting average: .192
- Home runs: 4
- Runs batted in: 16
- Stats at Baseball Reference

Teams
- Philadelphia Phillies (2016)

Tyler David Goeddel (born October 20, 1992) is an American former professional baseball outfielder. He played in Major League Baseball (MLB) for one season with the Philadelphia Phillies in 2016.

== Career ==
=== Tampa Bay Rays ===
Goeddel attended St. Francis High School in Mountain View, California. The Tampa Bay Rays selected Goeddel in the first round, with the 41st overall selection, of the 2011 Major League Baseball draft. He signed with the Rays and made his professional debut in 2012 with the Single-A Bowling Green Hot Rods of the Midwest League. He returned to Bowling Green in 2013, batting .249/.313/.389 with 7 home runs and 65 RBI in 112 games. After the season, he played for the Brisbane Bandits of the Australian Baseball League. Goeddel spent 2014 with the High-A Charlotte Stone Crabs of the Florida State League and slashed .269/.349/.408 with 6 home runs and 61 RBI. Goeddel spent the 2015 season with the Double-A Montgomery Biscuits of the Southern League, logging a .279/.350/.433 slash line with career-highs in home runs (12) and RBI (72).

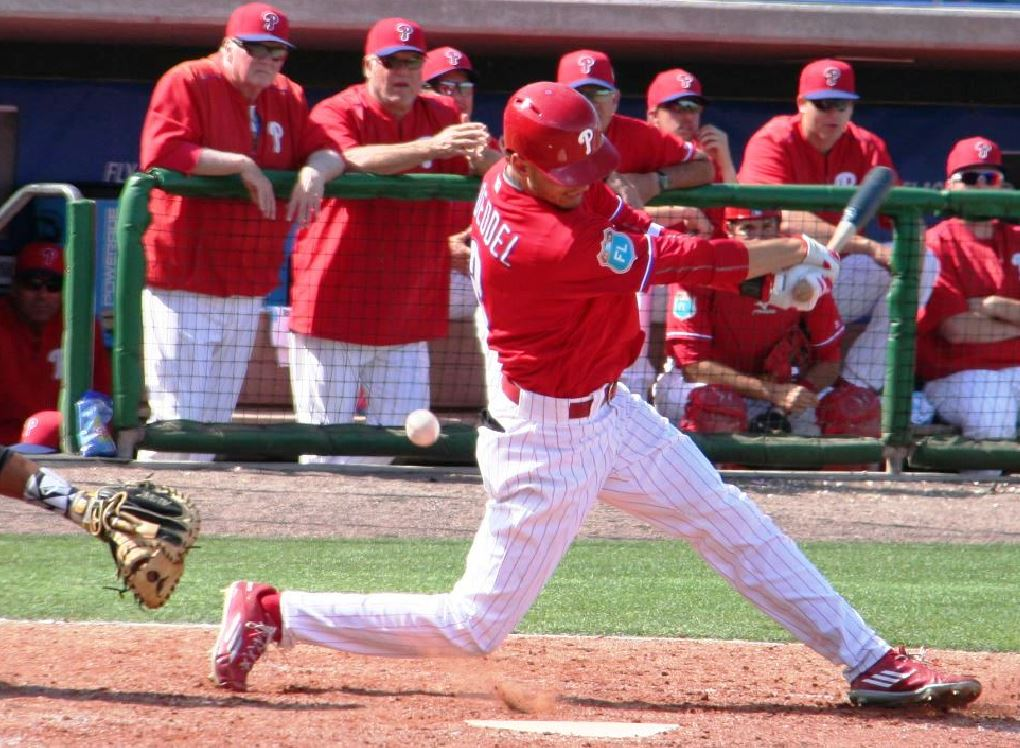
Goeddel with the Phillies in Spring Training 2016

=== Philadelphia Phillies ===
The Philadelphia Phillies selected Goeddel with the first pick of the 2015 Rule 5 draft. He made the Phillies' Opening Day roster, and debuted in the major leagues on April 6, 2016. On May 18, 2016, he hit his first career home run off of Miami Marlins pitcher José Ureña. Goeddel remained with the Phillies for the entire season, and hit .192/.258/.291 with 4 home runs and 16 RBI in 92 games.

At the end of spring training in 2017, the Phillies optioned Goeddel to the Double-A Reading Fightin Phils of the Eastern League. On March 31, 2017, the Phillies designated Goedel for assignment so they could select the contract of Brock Stassi.

=== Cincinnati Reds ===
On April 5, 2017, Goeddel was claimed off waivers by the Cincinnati Reds and optioned to the Triple-A Louisville Bats of the International League. He was outrighted off of the 40-man roster on April 7. Goeddel spent the season split between Louisville and the Double-A Pensacola Blue Wahoos, and hit a cumulative .259/.360/.378 with 6 home runs and 36 RBI in 117 games between the two teams. Goeddel was assigned to Louisville to begin the 2018 season, but hit .229/.326/.349 in 27 games and was released by the Reds organization on May 13, 2018.

=== Los Angeles Dodgers ===
On May 16, 2018, Goeddel signed a minor league contract with the Los Angeles Dodgers organization. He played in 51 games for the Double-A Tulsa Drillers, hitting .212 and also got into four games for Triple-A Oklahoma City Dodgers, with two hits in eight at-bats. Goeddel elected free agency following the season on November 2.

=== Washington Nationals ===
On January 21, 2019, Goeddel signed a minor league contract with the Washington Nationals organization. He was assigned to the Double-A Harrisburg Senators to begin the year. After hitting .208/.300/.289 in 69 games in Harrisburg, Goeddel was released by the Nationals on July 13.

== Personal life ==
Goeddel's brother Erik is a former professional baseball player. The brothers' father, David Goeddel, is a biologist responsible for the development of both synthetic insulin and human growth hormone.
