= Erik Goeddel =

American baseball player (born 1988)

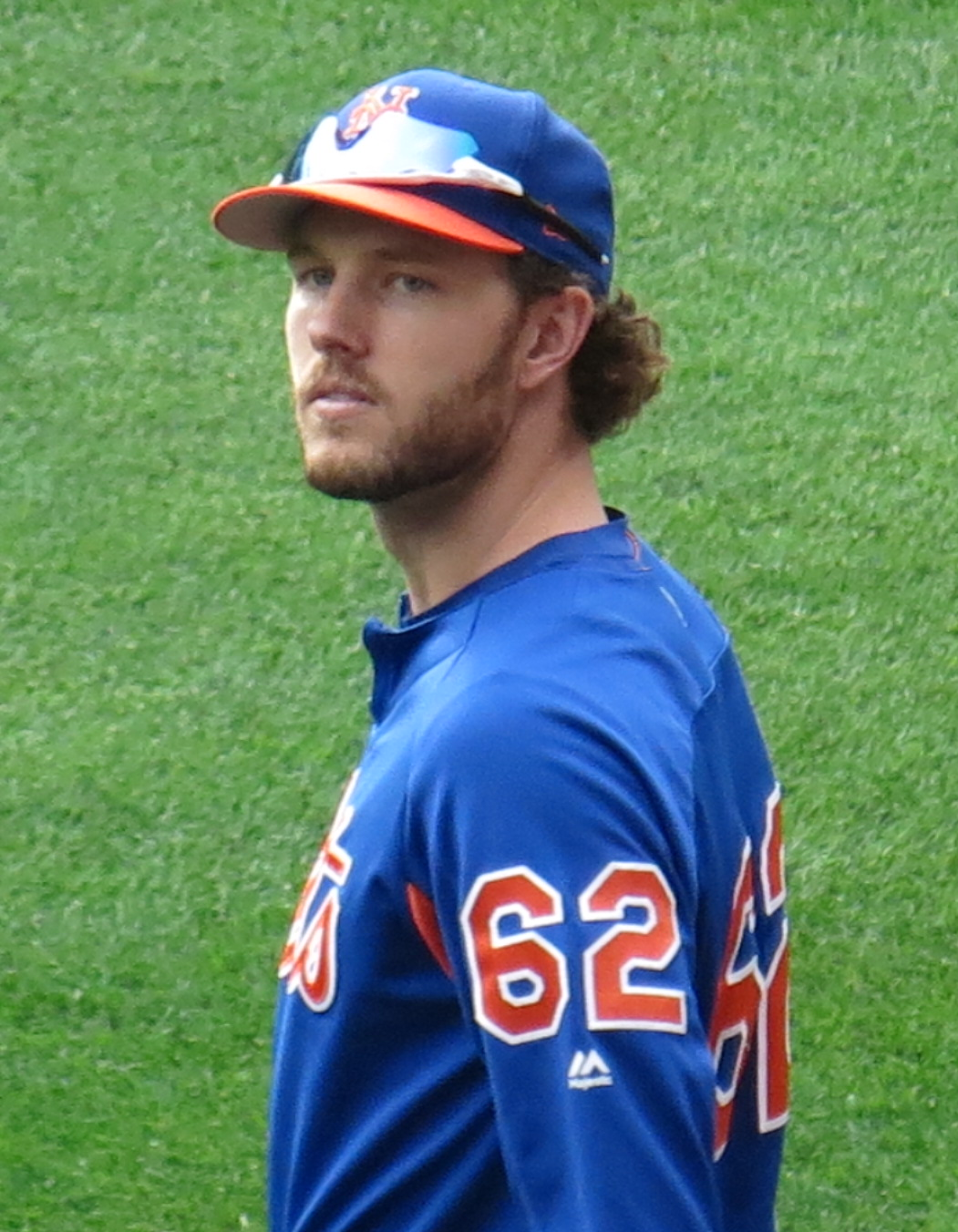
- Goeddel with the Mets in 2017
- Pitcher
- Born: December 20, 1988 (age 37); San Mateo, California, U.S.
- Batted: Right Threw: Right

MLB debut
- September 1, 2014, for the New York Mets

Last MLB appearance
- August 15, 2018, for the Los Angeles Dodgers

MLB statistics
- Win–loss record: 6–4
- Earned run average: 3.69
- Strikeouts: 153
- Stats at Baseball Reference

Teams
- New York Mets (2014–2017); Seattle Mariners (2018); Los Angeles Dodgers (2018)

Erik Van Norman Goeddel (born December 20, 1988) is an American former professional baseball pitcher. He played in Major League Baseball (MLB) for the New York Mets, Seattle Mariners, and Los Angeles Dodgers.

== Career ==
=== Amateur career ===
Goeddel attended Bellarmine College Prep in San Jose, California, where Baseball America and Perfect Game USA ranked him the third-best high school baseball prospect in the United States and Canada. After going undrafted in the 2007 Major League Baseball draft, Goeddel enrolled at the University of California, Los Angeles (UCLA), where he played college baseball for the UCLA Bruins. In 2009, he played collegiate summer baseball with the Brewster Whitecaps of the Cape Cod Baseball League.

=== New York Mets ===
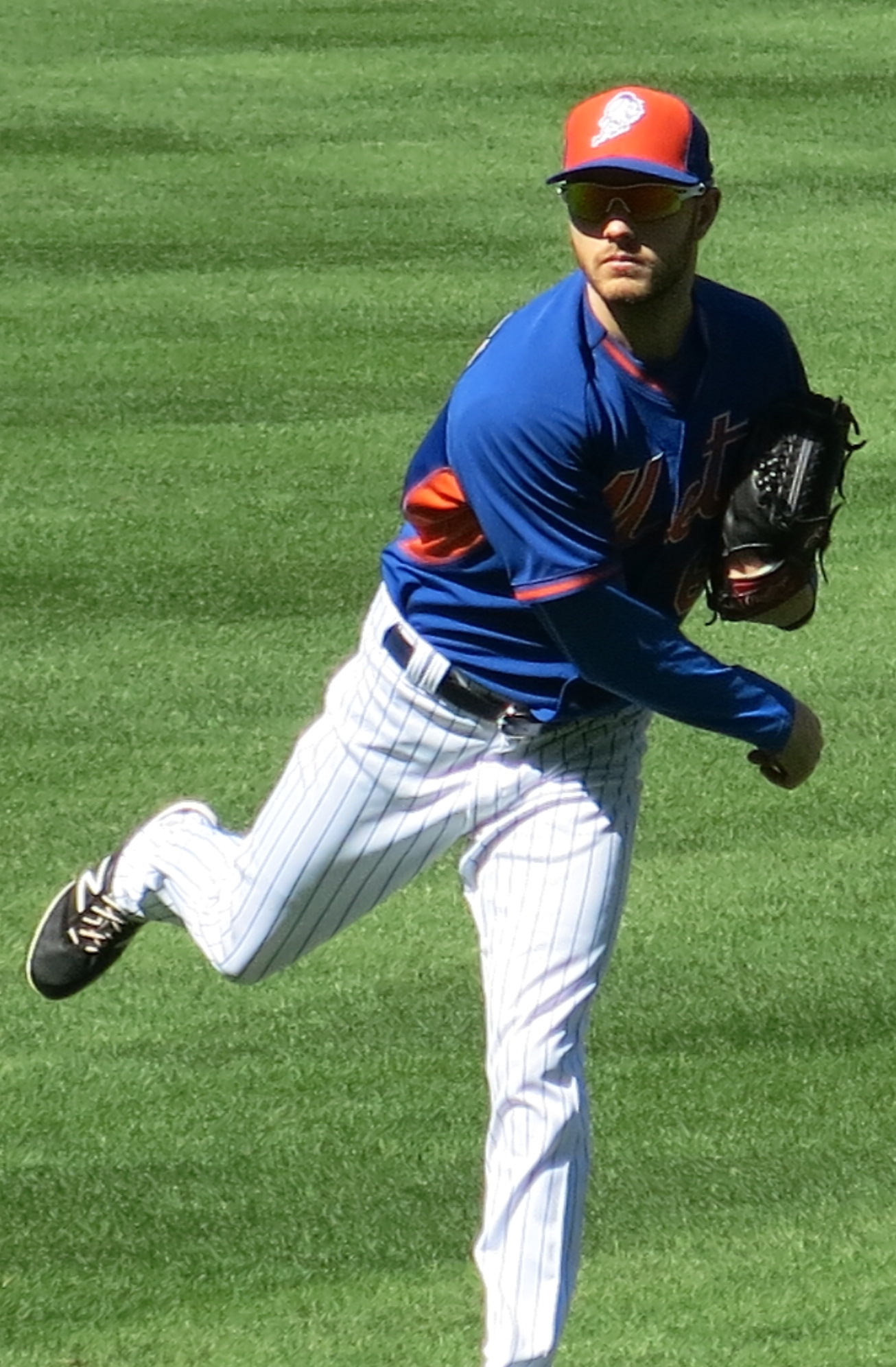
Goeddel with the Mets in 2016

The New York Mets selected Goeddel in the 24th round of the 2010 MLB draft. The Mets added Goeddel to their 40-man roster after the 2013 season. Goeddel played in the minors with the rookie-level Gulf Coast League Mets, Single-A Savannah Sand Gnats, High-A St. Lucie Mets, Double-A Binghamton Mets, and Triple-A Las Vegas 51s.

Goeddel was called up to the majors on September 1, 2014, and made his major league debut the same day, pitching in relief against the Miami Marlins in a 6-9 loss. Goeddel replaced Jeurys Familia with two on and one out in the eighth, and walked in the third run of the inning. Goeddel finished the season with a 2.70 ERA appearing in 6 games with 6.2 innings pitched getting 6 strikeouts with a WHIP of 1.05 while giving up 3 hits, 2 runs and 4 walks.

Goeddel was called up on April 7, 2015 with then-closer Jenrry Mejía going on the disabled list on April 5. On June 12, Goeddel was placed on the disabled list with a right elbow strain. His spot on the roster was replaced by Danny Muno. He spent the majority of the season since the injury rehabbing with the Binghamton Mets. He was promoted back again on September 1 due to expanded rosters.

When the Mets reached the playoffs, Goeddel was placed on the roster for the NLDS making one appearance in game three in the top of the ninth inning giving up three runs in a 13-7 win for the Mets. While giving up the runs, he gave 4 hits, 1 home run while facing 4 batters. However, he was replaced by Sean Gilmartin to be on the roster for the NLCS. It was the only change made to the roster from the NLDS. Goeddel finished the season with 1-1 record, 2.43 ERA, and 34 strikeouts in 35 games with 33 1/3 innings pitched.

Goeddel made 36 appearances out of the bullpen for the Mets during the 2016 season, compiling a 2-2 record and 4.54 ERA with 36 strikeouts across 35 2/3 innings pitched.

Goeddel pitched in 33 games for New York in 2017, posting an 0-1 record and 5.28 ERA with 33 strikeouts over 29 innings of work. On October 25, 2017, Goeddel was removed from the 40-man roster and sent outright to Las Vegas. He elected free agency on November 6.

=== Seattle Mariners ===
On December 19, 2017, Goeddel signed a minor league deal with the Texas Rangers. He was released on March 19, 2018.

On March 20, 2018, Goeddel signed a minor league contract with the Seattle Mariners organization. He was assigned to the Triple-A Tacoma Rainiers to begin the season. On May 3, the Mariners selected Goeddel's contract, adding him to their active roster. In five appearances for Seattle, he posted a 2-0 record and 1.23 ERA with nine strikeouts across 7 1/3 innings pitched. Goeddel was designated for assignment by the Mariners on May 16.

=== Los Angeles Dodgers ===
On May 18, 2018, Goeddel was claimed off waivers by the Los Angeles Dodgers. He pitched in 26 games for the Dodgers, posting a 3.38 ERA with 35 strikeouts and one win. Goeddel missed much of the season with an elbow injury that shut him down for good in August. Goeddel was designated for assignment by Los Angeles on November 20 and released the following day.

== Personal life ==
Goeddel's brother, Tyler, is also a professional baseball player. Their father, David Goeddel, is a pioneering biologist responsible for the development of both synthetic insulin and human growth hormone.
