= OpenTable =

American internet company

OpenTable, Inc.

- Screenshot
- Website type: Subsidiary
- Founded: July 2, 1998; 28 years ago
- Headquarters: San Francisco, California, United States
- No. of locations: 80 (2026)
- Area served: Worldwide
- Founders: Chuck Templeton; Sid Gorham; Eric Moe
- Key people: Debby Soo (CEO)
- Industry: Internet
- Services: Table reservation
- Revenue: ▲US$190.05M (2013)
- Operating income: ▲US$46.429M (2013)
- Net income: ▲US$33.385M (2013)
- Total assets: ▲US$310.971M (2013)
- Total equity: ▲US$230.262M (2013)
- Employees: 1450 (2019)
- Parent: Booking Holdings
- Website: opentable.com
- Current status: Active

OpenTable is an online restaurant-reservation service company founded by Sid Gorham, Eric Moe and Chuck Templeton on July 2, 1998, and based in San Francisco, California.

In 1998, operations began with a limited selection of restaurants in San Francisco. Restaurants used the company's back-end software to process the reservations made on the website, resulting in a real-time reservation system for both diners and restaurants. The service has since expanded to cover more than 55,000 restaurants in more than 80 countries as of 2024. In June 2014, the company was acquired by Priceline Group for $2.6 billion.

Reservations are free to end users; the company charges restaurants flat monthly and per-reservation fees for their use of the system. According to the company, it seats over 1 billion diners per year.

== History ==
OpenTable was founded by Chuck Templeton on July 2, 1998, and initially incorporated in California as easyeats.com, Inc.

On May 21, 2009, the company held its initial public offering (IPO), on the NASDAQ stock exchange under the ticker symbol OPEN. The underwriters of the IPO were Merrill Lynch, Allen & Company, Stifel Nicolaus, and ThinkEquity.

On October 1, 2010, the company acquired Toptable, a restaurant reservation site in the UK.

On January 29, 2013, the company announced that it had entered a definitive agreement to acquire Foodspotting.

On June 13, 2014, the company agreed to a takeover offer by the Priceline Group of $103 a share, a 46% premium on the previous day's closing stock price. The offer valued the company at $2.6 billion. Both companies said OpenTable would continue to operate as a separate business under the same management.

In August 2020, OpenTable named Debby Soo as its new CEO.

In 2024, OpenTable signed a partnership deal with Visa that gives certain cardholders access to reservation slots at popular restaurants.

== Information ==
=== For users ===
Users search for restaurants and reservations based on such parameters as dates, times, cuisine, and price range. Users who have registered their email address with the system will then receive a confirmation email. Users can also receive 100 or 1,000 points after dining that can be redeemed for discounts at member restaurants.

The company also has a mobile application that allows users to find and book dinner reservations.

In April 2024, the company announced a policy change under which anonymous reviews will no longer be allowed beginning May 22. All reviews will display the user's display photo and first name at a minimum, and all existing reviews will be retroactively deanonymized to meet this standard. After receiving significant pushback, OpenTable quickly announced that it would not apply the new policy retroactively, leaving previous reviews anonymous. The start of the new policy was also pushed back to later in the year.

=== For restaurants ===
Restaurant owners use an Electronic Reservation Book which computerizes restaurant host-stand operations and replaces existing paper reservation systems. The system handles reservation management, table management, guest recognition, and email marketing.

In 2019, OpenTable chief technology officer Joseph Essas, an Orthodox Jew, said that only about 30 of the platform’s roughly 55,000 restaurants met his strict kosher requirements.

== See also ==
- List of companies based in San Francisco
- List of websites about food and drink
