= Hillsborough, California =

City in California, United States

- Town in California
- Town of Hillsborough
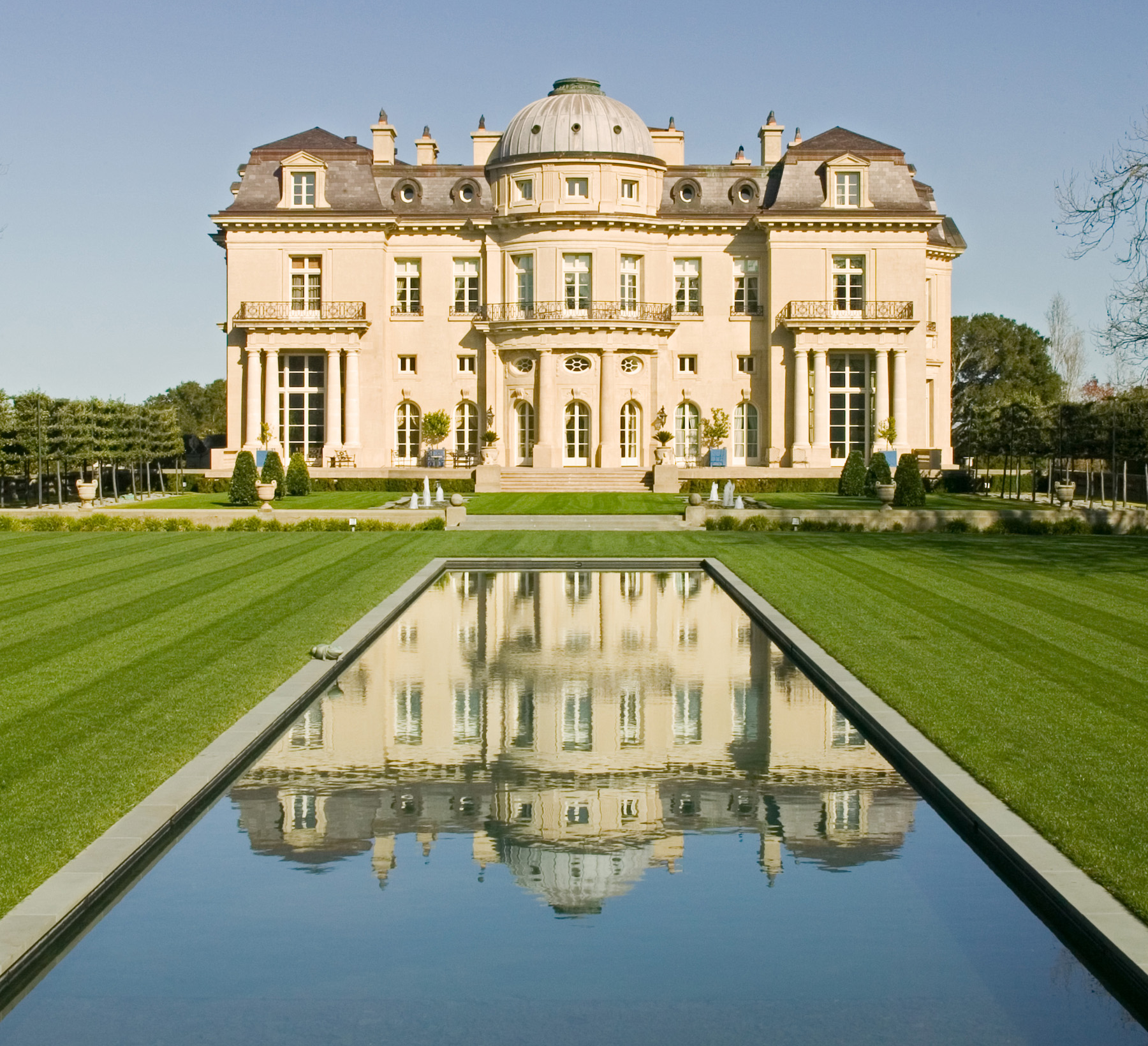
- Carolands

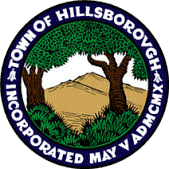
- Seal
- Interactive map of Hillsborough, California
- Location in the United States
- Coordinates: 37°33′37″N 122°21′23″W
- Country: United States
- State: California
- County: San Mateo
- Incorporated: May 5, 1910

Area
  - Total: 6.17 sq mi (15.97 km^{2})
  - Land: 6.17 sq mi (15.97 km^{2})
  - Water: 0 sq mi (0.00 km^{2}) 0%
- Elevation: 322 ft (98 m)

Population (2020)
  - Total: 11,387
  - Density: 1,847.1/sq mi (713.15/km^{2})
- Time zone: UTC-8 (Pacific)
  - Summer (DST): UTC-7 (PDT)
- ZIP code: 94010
- Area code: 650
- FIPS code: 06-33798
- GNIS feature IDs: 1659735, 2412752
- Website: hillsborough.net

Hillsborough is an incorporated town in San Mateo County, California, United States, in the San Francisco Bay Area. It is located 17 miles (27 km) south of San Francisco on the San Francisco Peninsula, bordered by Burlingame to the north, San Mateo to the east, Highlands-Baywood Park to the south, and Interstate 280 to the west. The population was 11,387 at the 2020 census.

== History ==
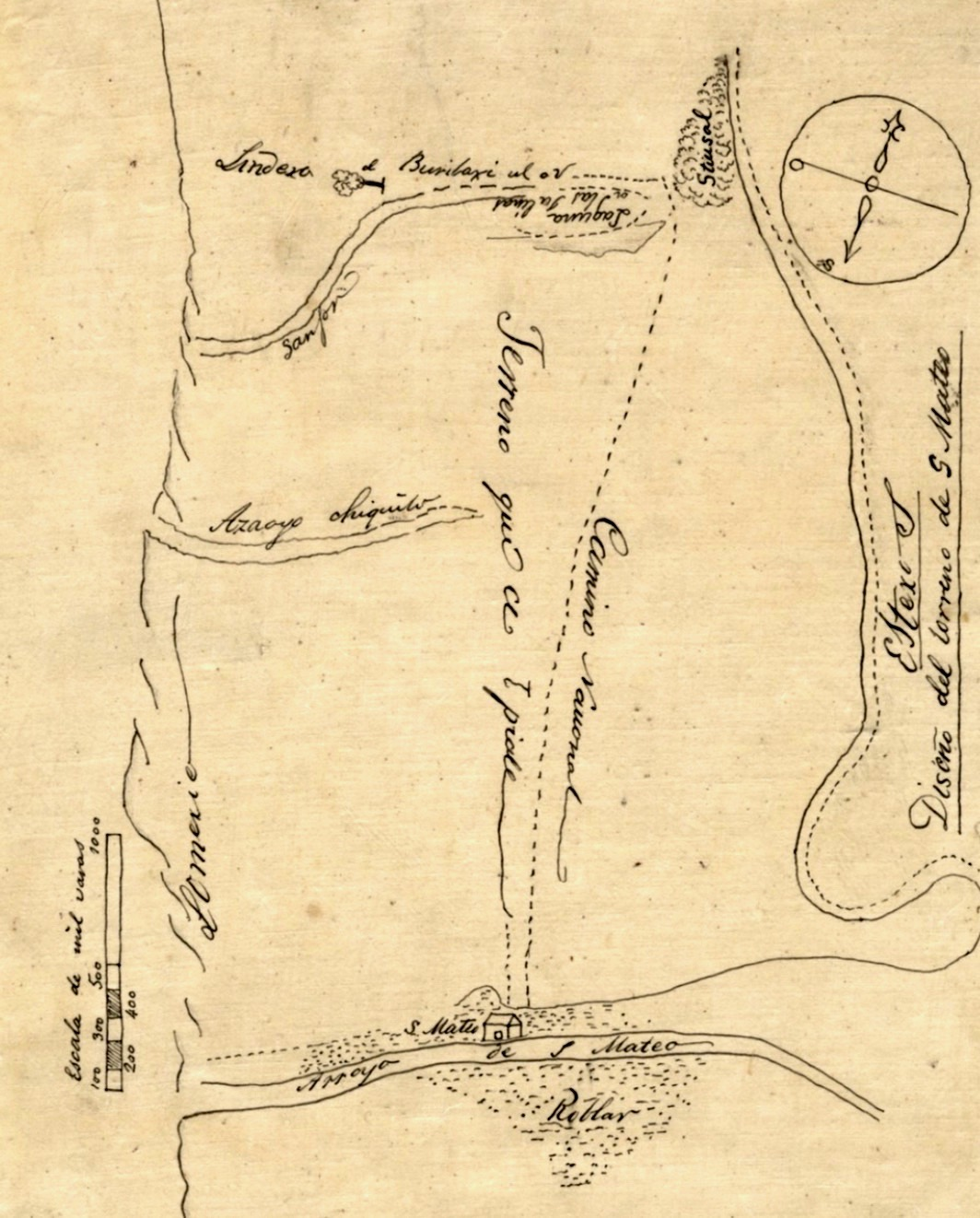
Hillsborough was originally part of Rancho San Mateo, granted to Californio ranchero Cayetano Arenas in 1846.

Hillsborough is located on the Rancho San Mateo Mexican land grant which was purchased by William Davis Merry Howard, son of a wealthy Hillsborough, New Hampshire, shipping magnate, in 1846. Howard settled his family in this area, which attracted wealthy San Franciscans. On May 5, 1910, Hillsborough residents voted to incorporate. From the town's foundation until 1963, it was an exclusive community for wealthy whites. In 1963, Jack and Betty Ken, the first-generation children of Chinese Immigrants, purchased land in the town. This made them the first non-white people to own land in the town, effectively desegregating Hillsborough.

== Geography and environment ==
According to the United States Census Bureau, the town has a total area of 6.2 square miles (16 km^{2}), all land. The area's considerably winding, hilly topography, and impossibility of a grid layout make Hillsborough notoriously challenging to navigate. Many lots include fairly steep slopes, particularly the western side of the town, with the landscape generally flattening to the east as it descends from the 280 freeway to El Camino Real and the towns of Burlingame and San Mateo.

Three prominent streams drain the mostly wooded slopes of Hillsborough: San Mateo Creek, Cherry Canyon Creek, and Sanchez Creek. In all three cases, the upper watersheds are closed-canopy California oak woodlands, with dominant trees of Coast Live Oak, Pacific Madrone and California Bay.

The upper drainage area of San Mateo Creek in Hillsborough contains significant serpentinite outcrops, which are known habitats for several rare plant species including the San Mateo woolly sunflower. Other common plants include toyon, gooseberry, lupine, monkeyflower and coffeeberry. Commonly observed mammals include California mule deer, raccoons, opossum, coyotes, rabbits, squirrels, and skunks. Mountain lions are known to live and roam in the green belts that surround the city.

Hillsborough is bordered by Burlingame to the north, San Mateo to the east, Highlands-Baywood Park to the south, and Interstate 280 to the west.

Hillsborough's landscape is dominated by large homes; the town zoning and subdivision ordinances require a 2,500-square-foot (230 m^{2}) minimum house size and minimum lot size of 0.5 acres (2,000 m^{2}). As a result, there are no apartments, condominiums or townhouses in the city limits.

The town has no commercial zoning and thus no businesses within the town limits; the only non-residential properties are the town's four public and three private schools, town and county government facilities, a golf course, a country club, and small parks.

== Demographics ==
Historical population
Census	Pop.	Note	%±
1920	931		—
1930	1,891		103.1%
1940	2,747		45.3%
1950	3,552		29.3%
1960	7,554		112.7%
1970	8,753		15.9%
1980	10,372		18.5%
1990	10,667		2.8%
2000	10,825		1.5%
2010	10,825		0.0%
2020	11,387		5.2%
U.S. Decennial Census; 1860–1870 1880-1890; 1900 1910 1920; 1930 1940 1950; 1960 1970 1980; 1990 2000 2010

=== Racial and ethnic composition ===
Hillsborough town, California – Racial and ethnic composition Note: the US Census treats Hispanic/Latino as an ethnic category. This table excludes Latinos from the racial categories and assigns them to a separate category. Hispanics/Latinos may be of any race.
Race / Ethnicity (NH = Non-Hispanic)	Pop 2000	Pop 2010	Pop 2020	% 2000	% 2010	% 2020
White alone (NH)	7,541	6,955	6,165	69.66%	64.25%	54.14%
Black or African American alone (NH)	54	40	43	0.50%	0.37%	0.38%
Native American or Alaska Native alone (NH)	4	3	1	0.04%	0.03%	0.01%
Asian alone (NH)	2,600	3,030	3,927	24.02%	27.99%	34.49%
Native Hawaiian or Pacific Islander alone (NH)	25	23	29	0.23%	0.21%	0.25%
Other race alone (NH)	27	35	49	0.25%	0.32%	0.43%
Mixed race or Multiracial (NH)	270	366	642	2.49%	3.38%	5.64%
Hispanic or Latino (any race)	304	373	531	2.81%	3.45%	4.66%
Total	10,825	10,825	11,387	100.00%	100.00%	100.00%

=== 2020 census ===
As of the 2020 census, Hillsborough had a population of 11,387 and a population density of 1,846.4 inhabitants per square mile (712.9/km^{2}). The median age was 47.7 years. The age distribution was 24.4% under the age of 18, 7.5% aged 18 to 24, 14.3% aged 25 to 44, 30.7% aged 45 to 64, and 23.1% who were 65 years of age or older. For every 100 females there were 96.9 males, and for every 100 females age 18 and over there were 93.5 males age 18 and over.

The census reported that 99.9% of the population lived in households, 0.1% lived in non-institutionalized group quarters, and no one was institutionalized. 100.0% of residents lived in urban areas, while 0.0% lived in rural areas.

There were 3,689 households in Hillsborough, of which 39.6% had children under the age of 18 living in them. Of all households, 76.0% were married-couple households, 2.1% were cohabiting-couple households, 8.3% were households with a male householder and no spouse or partner present, and 13.6% were households with a female householder and no spouse or partner present. About 10.8% of all households were made up of individuals and 7.8% had someone living alone who was 65 years of age or older. The average household size was 3.08. There were 3,183 families (86.3% of all households).

There were 3,935 housing units at an average density of 638.1 units per square mile (246.4 units/km^{2}), of which 93.7% were occupied and 6.3% were vacant. Of the occupied units, 92.6% were owner-occupied and 7.4% were occupied by renters. The homeowner vacancy rate was 1.0% and the rental vacancy rate was 7.1%.

Racial composition as of the 2020 census
Race	Number	Percent
White	6,304	55.4%
Black or African American	43	0.4%
American Indian and Alaska Native	4	0.0%
Asian	3,946	34.7%
Native Hawaiian and Other Pacific Islander	29	0.3%
Some other race	143	1.3%
Two or more races	918	8.1%

=== Income and poverty ===
In 2023, the U.S. Census Bureau estimated that the median household income in 2023 was more than $250,000, and the per capita income was $168,063. About 2.2% of families and 3.8% of the population were below the poverty line.

In 2019, a Bloomberg analysis ranked Hillsborough as the fifth richest town in the United States with a median household income of $373,128.

=== 2010 census ===
At the 2010 census Hillsborough had a population of 10,825. The population density was 1,748.9 inhabitants per square mile (675.3/km^{2}). The racial makeup of Hillsborough was 7,178 (66.3%) White, 42 (0.4%) African American, 7 (0.1%) Native American, 3,044 (28.1%) Asian, 23 (0.2%) Pacific Islander, 109 (1.0%) from other races, and 422 (3.9%) from two or more races. Hispanic or Latino of any race were 373 people (3.4%).

The census reported that 10,825 people (100% of the population) lived in households, as no other type of residence exists in Hillsborough.

There were 3,693 households, 1,445 (39.1%) had children under the age of 18 living in them, 2,804 (75.9%) were opposite-sex married couples living together, 220 (6.0%) had a female householder with no husband present, 114 (3.1%) had a male householder with no wife present. There were 66 (1.8%) unmarried opposite-sex partnerships, and 34 (0.9%) same-sex married couples or partnerships. 451 households (12.2%) were one person and 309 (8.4%) had someone living alone who was 65 or older. The average household size was 2.93. There were 3,138 families (85.0% of households); the average family size was 3.18.

The age distribution was 2,877 people (26.6%) under the age of 18, 466 people (4.3%) aged 18 to 24, 1,600 people (14.8%) aged 25 to 44, 3,667 people (33.9%) aged 45 to 64, and 2,215 people (20.5%) who were 65 or older. The median age was 47.5 years. For every 100 females, there were 94.8 males. For every 100 females age 18 and over, there were 91.9 males.

There were 3,912 housing units at an average density of 632.0 per square mile, of the occupied units 3,490 (94.5%) were owner-occupied and 203 (5.5%) were rented. The homeowner vacancy rate was 1.3%; the rental vacancy rate was 4.2%. 10,206 people (94.3% of the population) lived in owner-occupied housing units and 619 people (5.7%) lived in rental housing units.

== Politics ==
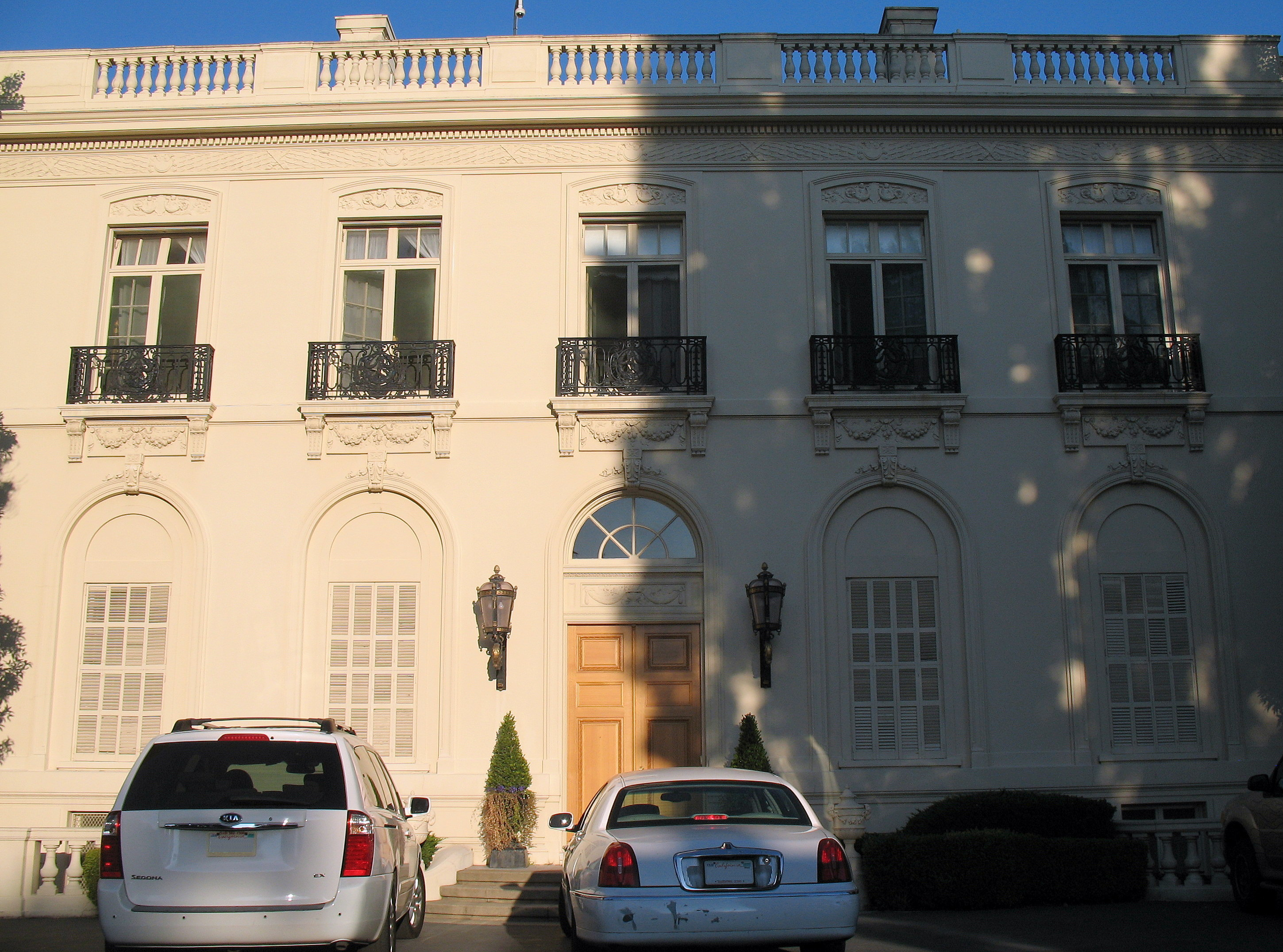
The historic Newhall Estate

According to the California Secretary of State, on February 10, 2019, Hillsborough had 7,802 registered voters. Of those, 2,638 (33.8%) were registered Democrats, 2,337 (30%) were registered Republicans, and 2,522 (32.3%) had declined to state a political party.

In the state legislature, Hillsborough is in the 13th senatorial district, represented by Democrat Josh Becker, and in the 21st Assembly district, represented by Democrat Diane Papan.

In the United States House of Representatives, Hillsborough is in California's 15th congressional district, represented by Democrat Kevin Mullin.

Because of the city's affluence, Hillsborough has historically leaned conservative. The city mainly supported Republican candidates for President and statewide/local offices up until 2016. It gave Mitt Romney 53% of the vote in 2012 against incumbent President Barack Obama's 45%. But four years later, the city swung massively against the Republican Party, with Democrat Hillary Clinton garnering 63%, with Donald Trump only carrying 31% of the vote in the city. In 2020, the city continued to swing left, President Joe Biden won 68% of the vote and Donald Trump only managed 29%.

== Schools ==
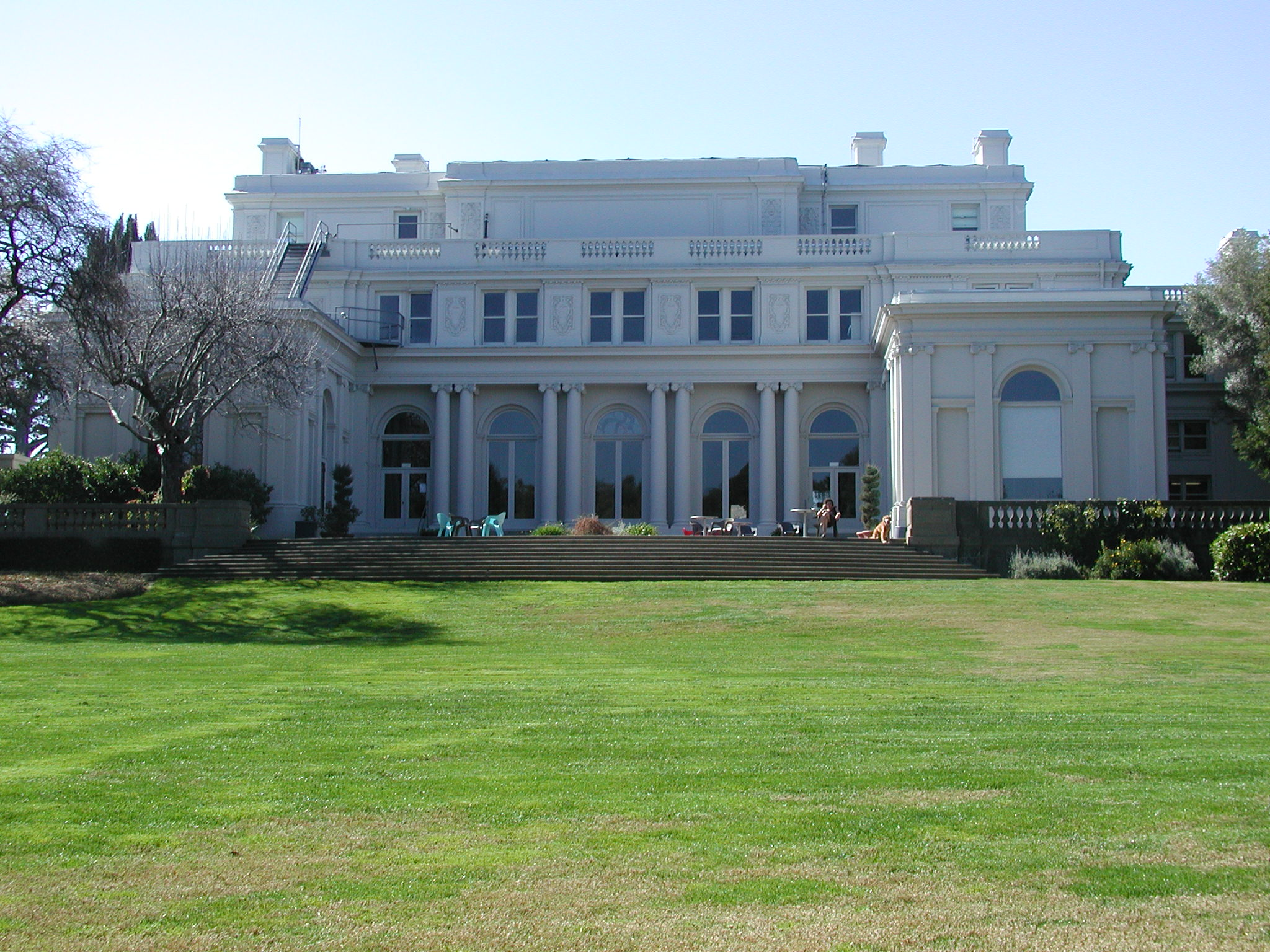
Crystal Springs Uplands School

Hillsborough has its own highly regarded and ranked public elementary and middle school system, but no public high school. High school-aged children can attend one of several schools in the San Mateo Union High School District, generally assigned by residential address. The town is also home to a small number of independent schools. The Hillsborough school district is the top-rated K through 8 district in northern San Mateo County.

- The Nueva School, a nationally recognized independent school serving gifted and talented students.
- Crocker Middle School, a public middle school, located on Ralston Avenue, named after William H. Crocker,
- West Elementary School, a public elementary school, located on Barbara Way.
- South Elementary School, a public elementary, at 303 El Cerrito.
- North Elementary School, a public elementary, at 545 Eucalyptus Avenue.
- Bridge School (California), a school serving students with physical and speech impairments.
- Crystal Springs Uplands School, a college preparatory middle and high school.

== Landmarks ==
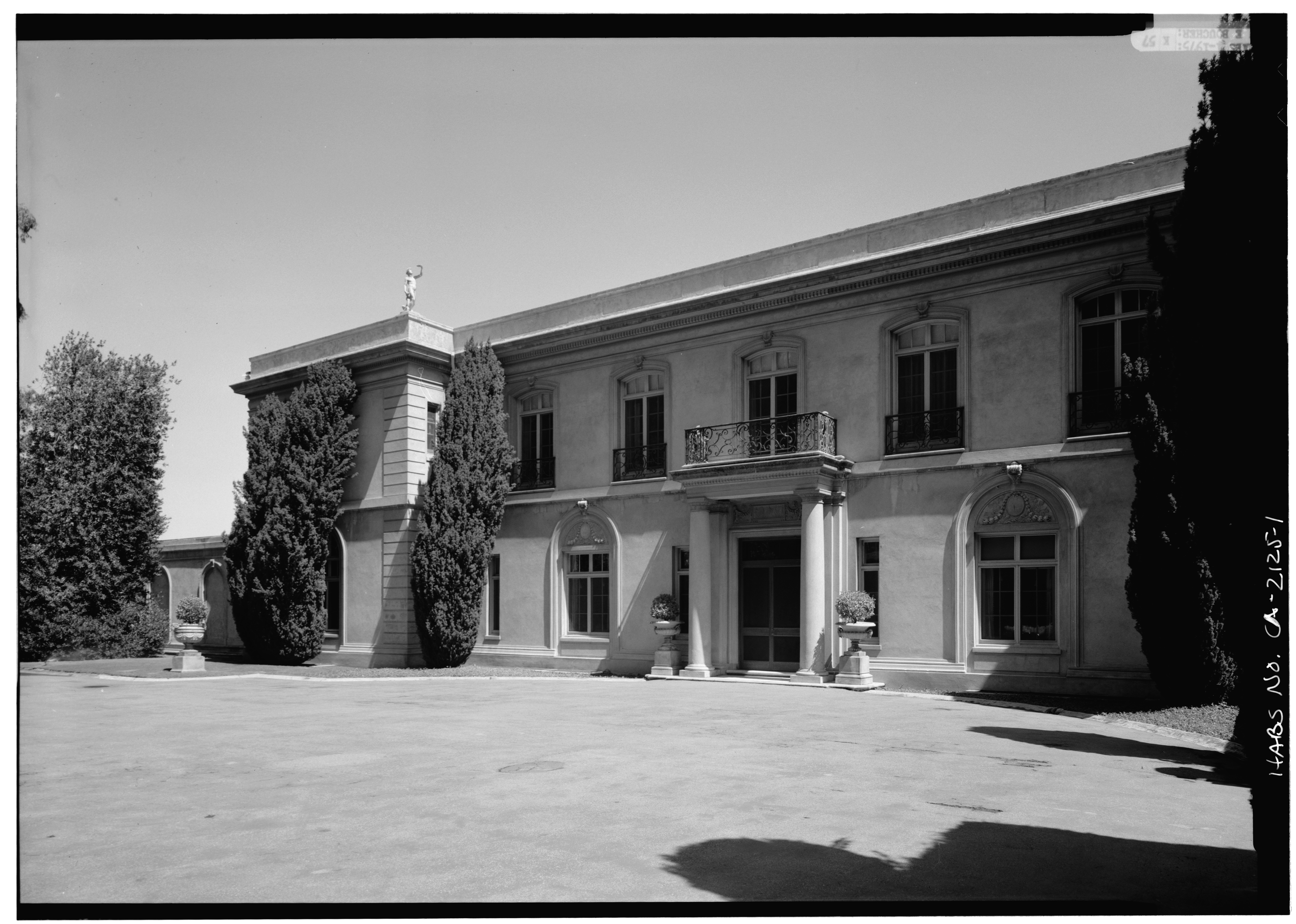
The historic Villa Rose

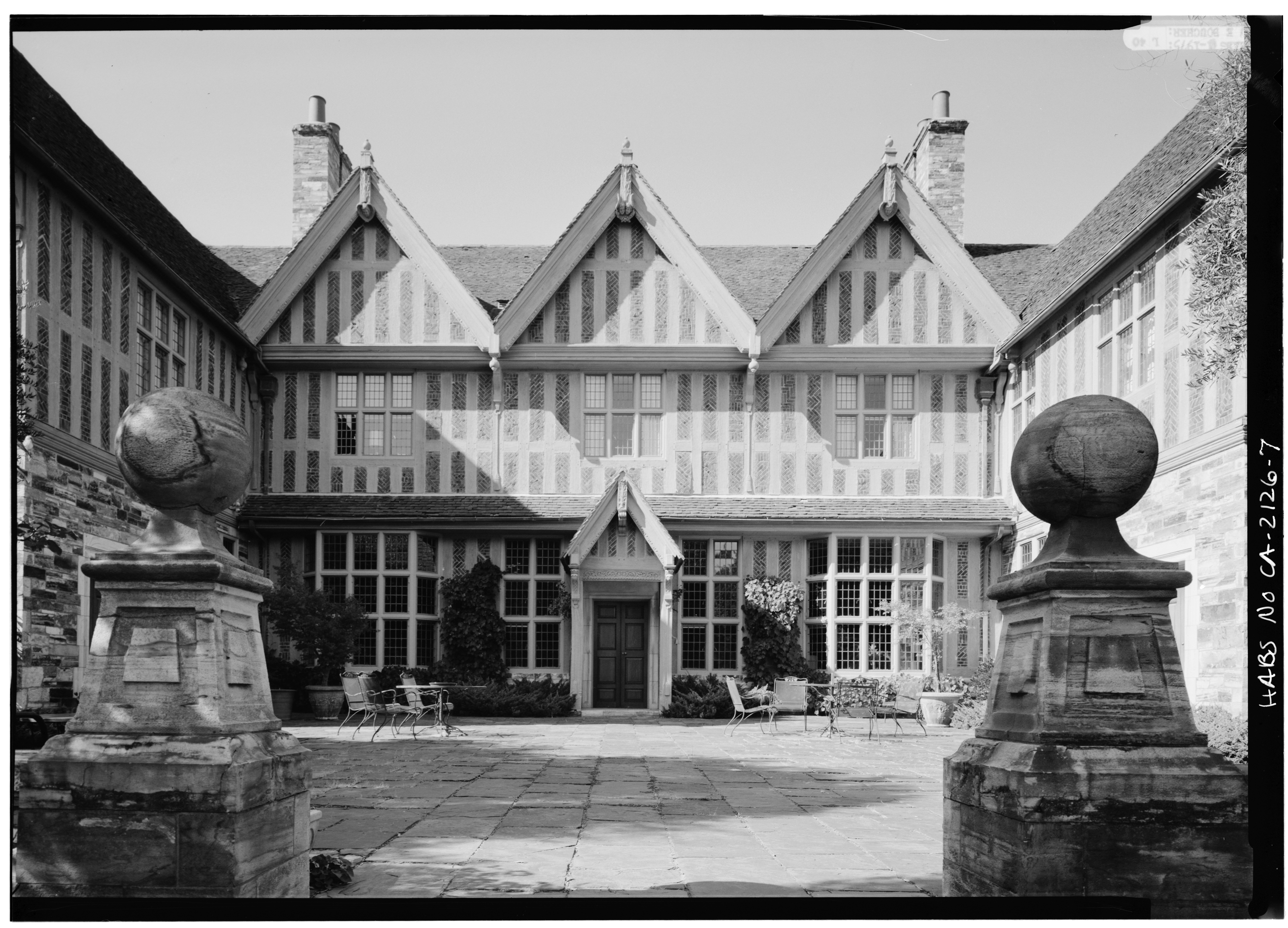
The historic Tobin Clark Estate

Primarily a residential suburb of San Francisco, Hillsborough has many mansions and other points of interest within the town's borders dating from the early 20th century.

- Arthur and Mona Hofmann House – Designed by Richard Neutra and is placed on the National Register of Historic Places.
- Carolands — Built by Harriet Pullman Carolan, heiress to the Pullman railway. At 65,000 ft² (6,000 m^{2}), it is one of the largest residences in the United States and is placed on the National Register of Historic Places.
- Skyfarm — Built by William H. Crocker, namesake of Crocker middle school, and grandson of Charles Crocker of California's Big Four railroad magnates. Designed by Arthur Brown, Jr., and opened in 1930. Home since the 1960s to The Nueva School.
- Tobin Clark Estate – Originally designed by the noted architect David Adler for Mrs. Celia Tobin Clark, one of the Peninsula's most prominent families of the early 20th Century
- Uplands — Built by Templeton Crocker, as a gift to his fiancée Helène Irwin, heiress to the C&H Sugar family fortune. Designed by Willis Polk; opened in 1912, with interior of 35,000 ft² (3,250 m^{2}). Home since the 1950s to Crystal Springs Uplands School.
- Western White House — Commissioned by George Randolph Hearst, son of William Randolph Hearst and now privately owned. It, like Hearst Castle, was designed by Julia Morgan.
- Sidney Bazett Residence — Designed by the architect Frank Lloyd Wright in 1939, the Bazett Residence is a fine example from his "Usonian" period. Completed in 1940, the house remains largely in its original condition. Another notable feature of the house is that one of its former occupants was Joseph Eichler, whose tenancy in the house is said to have greatly influenced the eventual designs used in his successful housing developments of the 1950s-1960s.
- ′The Flintstone House′ (a.k.a. the Adobe/Dome/Bubble/Marshmallow/Gumby house) — designed by architect William Nicholson and built in 1976 using sprayed concrete over balloon-shaped forms, now painted a deep/burnt orange color reminiscent of the Golden Gate Bridge's distinctive hue.

== Climate ==
December is the coolest month with an average high of 60 degrees, and September is the warmest month with an average high of 78 degrees. Hillsborough has a Mediterranean climate (Köppen climate classification Csa), with the vast majority of the precipitation from the months of November to April. On average, Hillsborough receives 17 inches (430 mm) of rain. With coastal mountains to the west of Hillsborough, it is blocked in the winter from much of the rainfall over Half Moon Bay, and in the summer it is blocked from virtually all the fog of the coast. Hillsborough receives an average of 307 days of sunshine annually, with 52 days of recordable precipitation per year.

== Notable people ==
- Roxy Bernstein – sports broadcaster
- Toni Breidinger – NASCAR driver
- Pat Burrell – baseball player
- Jason Calacanis – Internet entrepreneur
- Alyssa Campanella – Miss California USA 2011
- Sam Chavez – professional golfer
- Moon Fun Chin - aviator-businessman, World War II Hump pilot
- Alden W. Clausen – former president of The World Bank; former chairman, president and CEO of Bank of America
- Jenny Craig – weight loss guru, founder of Jenny Craig, Inc.
- William H. Crocker – founder and president of Crocker National Bank, member of committee that built San Francisco Opera House and Veterans Building
- Bing Crosby – singer, actor, raised his second family in Hillsborough
- Nathaniel Crosby – U.S. Amateur golf champion, son of Bing Crosby
- Eric Dane – actor
- Andre Ethier – baseball player
- Kathy Garver – actress
- Marjorie Gestring – diver, youngest Olympian to win gold medal
- Michael Grimes – managing director at Morgan Stanley
- Patty Hearst – heiress of Hearst newspaper fortune
- William Randolph Hearst I – newspaper publisher, politician, builder of Hearst Castle
- Rickey Henderson – Hall of Fame baseball player
- Charles B. Johnson – former chairman at Franklin Templeton Investments
- Jimmy Kimmel – comedian
- Erik Kislik – Chess International Master
- Brigitte Lin – Taiwanese actress
- Jeremy Lin – basketball player
- Phyllis Welch MacDonald – actress
- Greg Maddux – Hall of Fame baseball pitcher
- Imelda Marcos – former first lady of the Philippines
- David Marquardt – co-founder of venture capital firm August Capital
- Timothy Francis McCarthy – former President of Charles Schwab Corporation
- Sidney Mobell – artist and jeweler
- Larry Probst – chairman and former CEO of Electronic Arts (EA)
- Ryan Roslansky – CEO of LinkedIn
- Alicia Silverstone – actress
- J.T. Snow – baseball player
- Debby Soo – businesswoman
- Jackie Speier – former U.S. Representative
- Lucio Tan – businessman
- Bud Tribble – vice president of software technology at Apple Inc., among founders of NeXT, Inc.
- Marshall Tuck – politician
- Troy Tulowitzki – baseball player
- George Tupou V – former King of Tonga
- Salote Mafile'o Pilolevu Tuita – Tongan princess, only daughter of former King Tāufaʻāhau Tupou IV
- Siosa'ia Ma'ulupekotofa Tuita – Tongan diplomat and Consul General of San Francisco, husband of Salote Mafile'o Pilolevu Tuita
- Caspar Weinberger – Secretary of Defense, Secretary of Health, Education & Welfare
- Martin Yan – chef, star of TV show "Yan Can Cook," lives with family in Hillsborough
