= Timothy McCarthy =

Timothy McCarthy may refer to

- Timothy McCarthy (politician), American politician
- Timothy McCarthy (sailor) (1888–1917), Irish leading seaman
- Timothy Francis McCarthy (born 1951), former financial services chief executive
- Tim McCarthy (born 1949), American retired police officer and special agent of the U.S. Secret Service

== See also ==
- McCarthy (surname)
