= John O. Bellis =

American silversmith and jeweler

John O. Bellis (1872-1943) was an American silversmith and jeweler based in San Francisco, California. He was trained as a silversmith at Shreve & Co., and he designed silver plates, bowls, trays, mirrors, and brushes. He began designing jewelry in 1894. He opened a new store at 55 Geary Street in 1914.

His silverware can be seen at the Fine Arts Museums of San Francisco and the Los Angeles County Museum of Art (LACMA).
