= Professor Beware =

1938 film by Elliott Nugent

- Original theatrical poster
- Directed by: Elliott Nugent
- Written by: Screenplay: Delmer Daves; Adaptation: Jack Cunningham; Clyde Bruckman; Based on a story by Crampton Harris; Francis M. Cockrell; Marian B. Cockrell
- Produced by: Harold Lloyd
- Starring: Harold Lloyd
- Cinematography: Archie Stout
- Edited by: Duncan Mansfield
- Distributed by: Paramount Pictures
- Release date: 1938
- Running time: 93 minutes
- Country: United States
- Language: English
- Budget: $820,275
- Box office: $796,385

Professor Beware is a 1938 American comedy film starring Harold Lloyd and directed by Elliott Nugent. It was Phyllis Welch MacDonald's first and only film.

== Plot ==
Three thousand years after ancient Egyptian Neferus's death, Professor Dean Lambert (who looks like Neferus) is translating his history tablet by tablet. Dean is convinced that falling in love will ruin him as it did Neferus, whose love to the Pharaoh's daughter led to his downfall. He meets aspiring actress and heiress Jane Van Buren and exchanges clothes with her drunk audition partner, Snoop Donlan. Dean is arrested for stinking of liquor. His arrest makes the papers and he is asked to resign from the museum staff. Dean has ten days to join an expedition leaving for Egypt from New York and becomes a stowaway in the trailer of a pair of newlyweds bound for Niagara Falls. Snoop then accuses Dean of stealing his watch and clothes. Jane, meanwhile, follows the trailer in order to return Dean's clothes and the museum's car. The newlyweds kick Dean out, while the police trail him on suspicion of robbery and jumping bail. Jane then finds Dean and urges him to clear himself, but he convinces her to keep going to New York. While fleeing the police, Jane and Dean camp in the desert, and he falls in love and kisses her. The kiss causes a storm to break, just like the story of Neferus and Anebi. Dean is struck by lightning and begins speaking in a strange language.

The next day, he leaves Jane a note saying that "Death lies ahead" if they continue their romance. After many adventures, Sheriff Sweat of Springville, Pennsylvania, finally apprehends Dean, but Jane picks him up in the museum car, which is discovered by the police. A chase ensues. While hiding in the woods, the couple discusses the eighth tablet of Neferus, which says "marriage." After hopping a refrigerator car, the couple is brought before a kindly judge, who dismisses the charges brought against them so that they can marry. The papers print that Jane is to marry a hobo. Dean wants to avoid making his bad luck worse, but he marries Jane in New York. He then must face her father, who accuses him of being a fortune hunter. Dr. Ellison, head of the expedition, gives Dean a fake missing fragment of the ninth and last tablet for a wedding present, which Jane has inscribed with the story of Neferus saving Anebi from her father, who has abducted her. Dean boards what he believes is the Van Burens' yacht and fights for his bride, destroying the yacht, to the delight of Van Buren, who now accepts him. Jane then realizes Dean fought for her knowing the tablet was fake. The couple is united and, years later, as an old man, Dean finally finds the real ninth tablet, which assures him he is not going to die tomorrow.

== Cast ==
- Harold Lloyd as Professor Dean Lambert
- Phyllis Welch MacDonald as Jane Van Buren
- Raymond Walburn as Judge James G. Parkhouse Marshall
- Lionel Stander as Jerry
- William Frawley as Snoop Donlan
- Thurston Hall as Mr. Van Buren
- Cora Witherspoon as Mrs. Pitts
- Sterling Holloway as The Groom
- Mary Lawrence as The Bride

== Reception ==
Harold Lloyd's own company had been producing his films for a decade, but that procedure ended with Professor Beware. This time Lloyd participated only as an actor and partial investor; the film was actually made by Paramount's creative staff and technicians. By 1938 Lloyd's pace of production had slowed considerably; he had usually been seen in one or two films annually, but his latest films were released two years apart.

Theater owners offered mixed reactions to Professor Beware, usually disappointing. While some theaters attracted Lloyd's usual followers, others reported lower attendance and even walkouts. "Didn't seem to set so good with a little group of regulars who'd come regardless of hell or high water and punk shows. Pretty terrible for our friend Lloyd." (A. E. Eliasen, Rialto Theatre, Paynesville, Minnesota). "Harold has been off the screen so long that he has been forgotten." (C. R. Gregg. Liberty Theatre, Caney, Kansas). "I can't understand why so many of the exhibitors pan this one. We played same two days to good business." (P. G. Held, New Strand Theatre, Griswold, Iowa). "We tried to give this one away on bargain night, but we couldn't even do that. Harold, why don't you give up?" (Mayme P. Musselman, Princess Theatre, Lincoln, Kansas). Such negative feedback discouraged Lloyd from making any more movies, and he retired from the screen except for one final attempt in 1947 (The Sin of Harold Diddlebock, also known as Mad Wednesday).

Leonard Maltin described Professor Beware as "One of Lloyd's last vehicles has good moments, but tale of archeologist searching for rare tablet is thin."

The Harold Lloyd estate owns all of the comedian's films except Professor Beware, which Paramount sold to MCA for television syndication. The film was programmed regularly by local stations until the mid-1980s, since then, with the proliferation of cable networks, Professor Beware has gone out of circulation.

== See also ==
- Harold Lloyd filmography
