= Hillsborough City School District =

School district in California

Address
- 300 El Cerrito Avenue Hillsborough, California, 94010; United States

District information
- Type: Public
- Grades: K–8
- NCES District ID: 0617190

Students and staff
- Students: 1,268 (2020–2021)
- Teachers: 94.0 (FTE)
- Staff: 77.25 (FTE)
- Student–teacher ratio: 13.49:1

Other information
- Website: www.hcsdk8.org

The Hillsborough City School District is a public school district in Hillsborough, California, United States. Currently, the district serves over 1200 students who live in the town of Hillsborough.

== History ==
In 1850, Hillsborough opened its first classroom within George Howard's home to educate six enrolled students. In 1917, South Hillsborough School was built to serve students within grades K–8. It serves the whole town as the only middle school. It currently enrolls about 550 students in grades sixth, seventh and eighth. North and West Hillsborough Schools were built in the early 1950s to accommodate the growth within the town. William H. Crocker Middle School opened in 1959. After the passage of the Measure B bond in 2002, each of the Hillsborough schools were renovated and modernized.

== Schools ==
There are four schools within the Hillsborough City School District: three elementary schools and one middle school.

- William H. Crocker Middle School
- North Hillsborough Elementary School
- South Hillsborough Elementary School
- West Hillsborough Elementary School
