= Phyllis Welch MacDonald =

American actress (1913–2008)

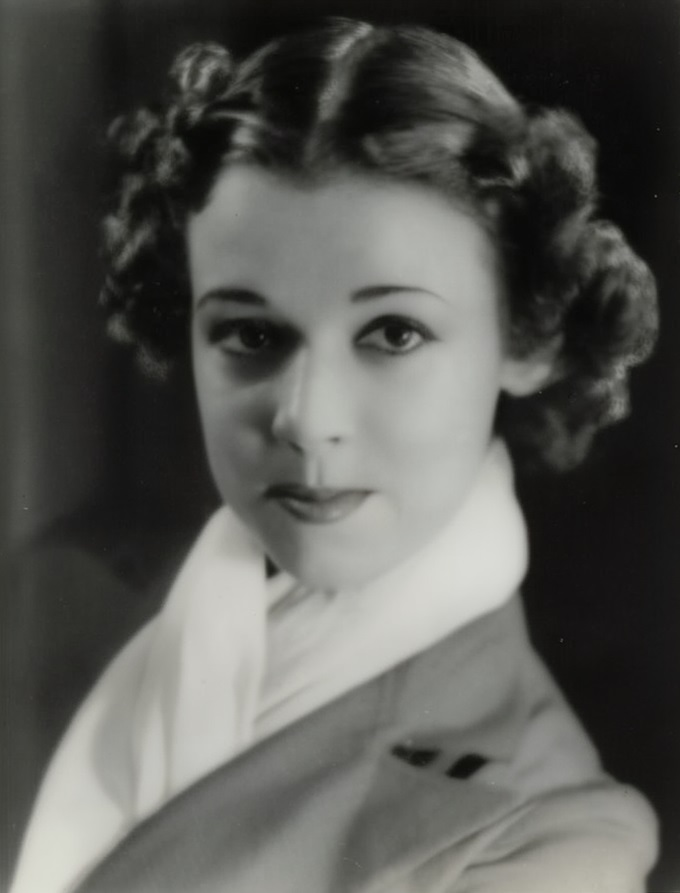
- Welch in 1937
- Born: July 16, 1913; Toledo, Ohio, U.S.
- Died: September 26, 2008, aged 95; San Mateo, California, U.S.
- Occupation: Actress
- Spouse: Graeme K. MacDonald

Phyllis Welch MacDonald (July 16, 1913 – September 26, 2008) was an American actress who enjoyed a brief, but successful, theater and film career during the late 1930s. MacDonald appeared in just one film role, Professor Beware, a comedy released in 1938.

== Biography ==
MacDonald was born in Toledo, Ohio.

She made her Broadway debut in the 1935 theatrical comedy, A Slight Case of Murder, by Howard Lindsay and Damon Runyon. She continued to appear in several Broadway shows over the next two years, her other credits including High Tor, and Granite by Clemence Dane

Welch was awarded the New Times Critics' Award for Best Supporting Actress for her role in the production of End of Summer , which opened in 1937. Her last Broadway appearance was in the 1937 theatrical production of the Maxwell Anderson fantasy, High Tor, which co-starred Burgess Meredith and Peggy Ashcroft.

Her success on Broadway led to a move to Hollywood to pursue a film career. MacDonald appeared in just one film during her brief career. In 1938, MacDonald was cast in the comedic film, Professor Beware in which she co-starred with actor Harold Lloyd. In order to get the part in Professor Beware, Welch had to sign a contract pledging not to become engaged or marry for a period of six months. According to the contract, which was reported by the Los Angeles Times in 1938, a violation of the agreement would have resulted in a $5,000 fine. The prohibition of marriage for six months was included in her contract because filmmakers felt that it would interfere with production of the movie.

Welch married her husband, Graeme K. MacDonald, in 1939 immediately after the completion of Professor Beware and left her professional acting career. The couple raised five sons during their marriage, which lasted more than fifty years. She settled with her family in Hillsborough, California, where she resided for sixty years.

She remained active within regional theater groups in the San Francisco Bay area. MacDonald often collaborated with actress Shirley Temple Black to promote Children's theater within the region. MacDonald co-founded the Peninsula Children's Theatre in the 1950s and served as its president. The Peninsula Children's Theatre offered plays and other productions for young audiences in the San Francisco Bay Area. She also served on the board of the Hillbarn Theatre.

An artist, MacDonald also worked as a portrait painter on commission. She was a 60-year resident of Hillsborough and was 95 years old when she died. She was an accomplished actress, both on Broadway in New York City and in Hollywood..

MacDonald died of natural causes in her sleep at her caretaker's home in San Mateo, California. She was 95 years old. Her husband, Graeme K. MacDonald, a contractor, died in 1993. She was survived by her five sons and their grandchildren. One of her grandchildren, actress Alexis MacDonald, is the founder of the Strings Attached Theater Company, which is based in New York City.
