= Sam Chavez =

American golfer

Personal information
- Full name: Samuel Fernando Chavez
- Nationality: United States
- Born: May 30, 1989 (age 37) Hillsborough, California, U.S.
- Height: 5 ft 10 in (1.78 m)
- Weight: 145 lb (66 kg; 10.4 st)

Career
- Sport: Golf
- College: University of Arkansas; University of New Mexico
- Turned professional: 2011
- Current tour: Canadian Tour
- Professional wins: 1

Samuel Fernando Chavez (born May 30, 1989) is an American professional golfer originally from Hillsborough, California. He is the son of a Cuban-born mother and a Mexican-American father. He is also the grandson of 1960s icon and civil rights leader César Chávez.

During college (2007–2011), Chavez played for the University of Arkansas Razorbacks and University of New Mexico Lobos golf teams. He plays on the Canadian Tour.

== High school ==
Chavez was a four-time most valuable player for the golf team at Woodside Priory School. He won the 2006 and 2007 Hawaiian High School Boys Invitational, finished second at the North/South Junior and turned in a third-place finish at the AJGA Kansas City/Fidelity Investments Junior.

== College career ==
=== University of Arkansas ===
==== Freshman year (2007–08) ====
Chavez competed in the final eight events of the regular season for the Razorbacks and earned his first postseason accolade when he was named to the SEC All-Freshman team. He made his debut in the UA lineup at the UNCG Bridgestone Collegiate where he finished in 76th place, but he would better his result at the next the three events which was capped at the Border Olympics where he tied for second place to lead Arkansas to the team title. He posted a two-under-par 214 at the event in Laredo, Texas. During the second round of the Border Olympics, Chavez fired a career-low 65 en route to his season-best result. He tied for 15th place at the Duck Invitational with a six-over-par 222. He totaled three top-20 results during his freshman campaign. He shot a 14-over-par 230 to finish in 53rd place at the SEC Championships. Chavez completed the season at the NCAA Central Regional where he tied for 109th place with a 22-over-par 235.

=== University of New Mexico ===
==== Junior year (2009–10) ====
Chavez took part in six varsity tournaments in his first year as a Lobo. His best finish was a tie for 25th at the John Burns Intercollegiate where he carded an even-par 216 (74-71-71). Overall, Chavez posted a 76.94 stroke average over 18 rounds for the season.

==== Senior year (2010–11) ====
During his senior year in college, Chavez participated in 14 tournaments, posting an average score of 75.27. He had his best performance at the Mark Simpson Invitational, finishing tied for fifth with a score of three under par. Overall, Chavez posted a pair of top-ten finishes early in the season and finished 29th at the Mountain West Conference Championship.

==== Academic All-American ====
As a consequence of maintaining a high grade-point average during his college career, and in addition to being highly ranked as an intercollegiate competitive golfer in a Division I NCAA school, Chavez was elected an Academic All-American for 2010–11 by the Capital One Academic All-America Program.

== Professional career ==
=== 2012 Canadian Tour ===
Chavez qualified for the 2012 Canadian Tour on September 19, 2011, in Burlington, Ontario, with scores of 70-68-71-72 and tying for 12th place overall.
