= Rancho San Mateo =

Mexican land grant in California

Coordinates: 37.580°N 122.330°W

Rancho San Mateo was a 6,439-acre (26.06 km^{2}) Mexican land grant on the San Francisco Peninsula, in present day San Mateo County, California.

It was given in 1846 by Governor Pio Pico to Cayetano Arenas.

Rancho San Mateo extended from the foothills of the Santa Cruz Mountains to San Francisco Bay. It included Coyote Point, about one-half the present city of San Mateo, all of Burlingame and most of Hillsborough.

== History ==
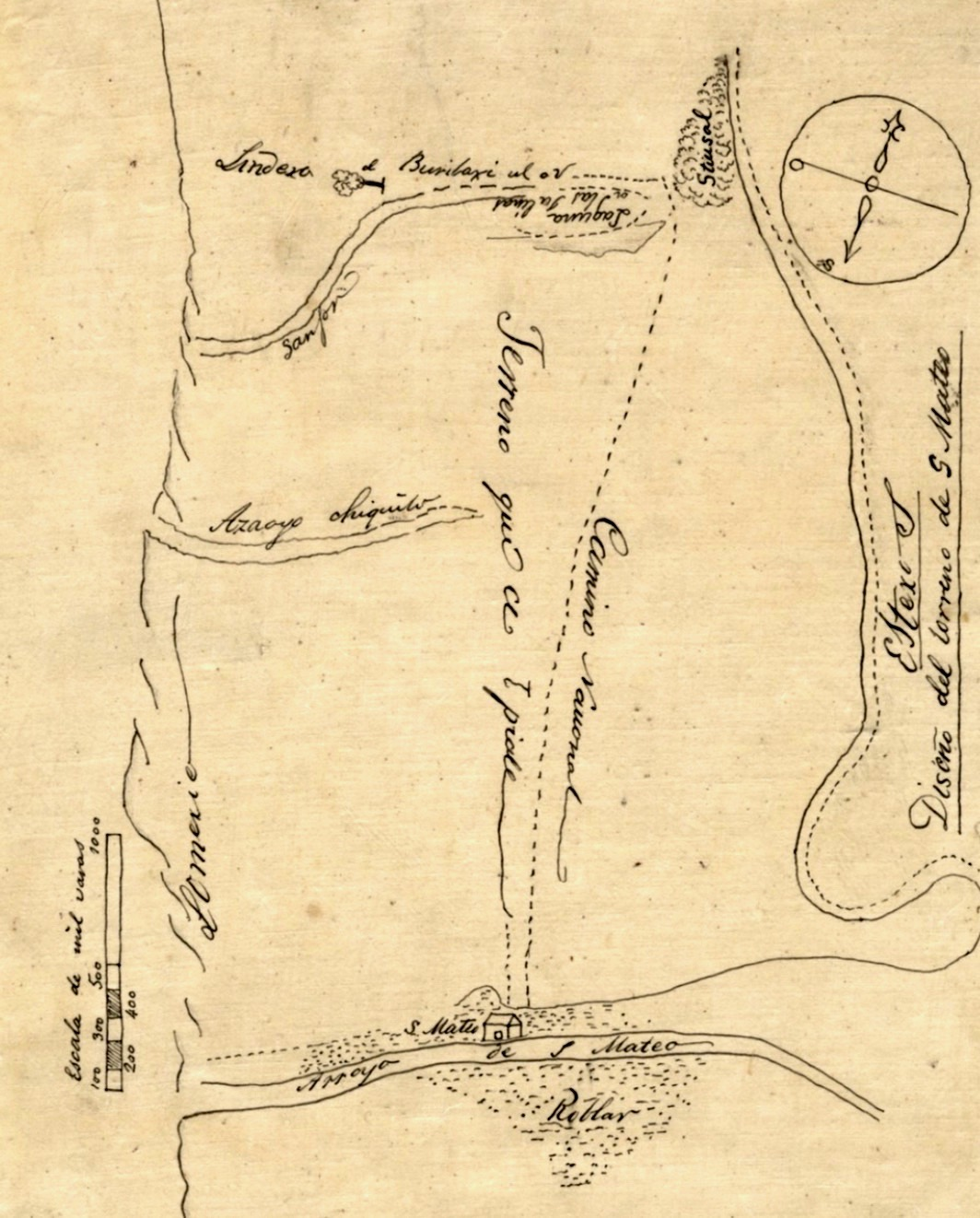
Diseño of Rancho San Mateo 1840s

Plat of San Mateo Rancho 1857

Pio Pico, the last governor of California under Mexican rule, made the grant to his secretary, Cayetano Arenas of the Pueblo de Los Ángeles, for his family’s service to the government. Cayetano Arenas father was Luis Arenas.

Arenas sold the property in 1846 to Yerba Buena (Pueblo de San Francisco) merchant and American immigrant William Davis Merry Howard. Howard with his wife, Agnes, retired from the city to live on the rancho in 1854, and built a residence named "El Cerrito" and developed a successful working ranch.

With the cession of California to the United States following the Mexican-American War, the 1848 Treaty of Guadalupe Hidalgo provided that the land grants would be honored. As required by the Land Act of 1851, a claim for Rancho San Mateo was filed with the Public Land Commission in 1852, and the grant was patented to William Davis Merry Howard in 1857. A claim by José de la Cruz Sánchez was rejected.

Howard's early death in 1856 at the age of thirty-seven led to the sale of most of the land to William C. Ralston, a prominent banker.

In 1861, Henry F. Teschemacher and Joseph P. Thompson were opposed in an important court case concerning the Rancho San Mateo patent and land under water at high tide.

In 1866, Anson Burlingame, the US Minister to China visited Ralston, and by the time he left he was the owner of 1,043 acres (4 km^{2}) of land. His name “Burlingame” was put onto the parcel map for reference. That visit to the San Francisco Peninsula, was Burlingame’s last. On a visit to Russia in 1870, Burlingame died. With his death the land reverted to Ralston. Ralston had plans for the area which he called “Ralstonville”, but he died in 1875 without many of his plans being realized.

The land passed to Ralston's business partner Senator William Sharon. Sharon died in 1885, and Sharon's son-in-law, Francis G. Newlands, became executor of Sharon’s estate.

== See also ==
- Ranchos of San Mateo County, California
- List of ranchos of California
