= Sidney Mobell =

American artist and jeweler (1926–2022)

- Born: April 10, 1926; Denver, Colorado, U.S.
- Died: November 4, 2022 (aged 96); Hillsborough, California, U.S.
- Resting place: Home of Peace Cemetery (Colma, CA)
- Known for: Jeweled art
- Spouse: Ronni J. Grant (1959–2002; her death)

Sidney F. Mobell (April 10, 1926 – November 4, 2022) was an American artist, jeweler, and philanthropist from San Francisco. He owned Mobell Jewelry and was known for his designs of everyday objects made of gold and jewels. He lived in Hillsborough, California.

== Biography ==
Sidney Mobell was born in Denver on April 10, 1926, and starting in 1937 he was raised an orphan.

Mobell eventually made his way to San Francisco and owned and operated several jewelry stores in the city until his retirement in 1995. In March 1996, Mobell Jewelry was sold to Shreve & Co..

Mobell was known for his transformation of ordinary, everyday items such as food cans and cellular phones into bejeweled pieces of art. Several of his works are housed in the Smithsonian American Art Museum, including a $2,000,000 USD Monopoly set made of 23-carat gold, with rubies and sapphires atop the chimneys of the houses and hotels. It is the most expensive Monopoly set ever produced.

Mobell was a guest on The Tonight Show Starring Johnny Carson, several times where he showcased his designs. He was also a donor to several healthcare causes.

Mobell died in Hillsborough, California, on November 4, 2022, at the age of 96.
