= Shreve & Co. =

American jeweler

Shreve & Company
- Company type: Private
- Industry: Jewellers
- Founded: 1852; 174 years ago in San Francisco, United States
- Headquarters: Palo Alto, California, United States
- Products: Jewelry
- Website: shreve.com

Shreve & Company is an established retailer of jewelry, from timepieces to diamonds, headquartered in San Francisco, California. Incorporated in 1894 by George Rodman and Albert J. Lewis, it is considered the oldest commercial establishment in San Francisco. Shreve & Co has had a tumultuous history, ranging from Chapter 11 bankruptcy in 1992 to most recently losing their lease to Harry Winston.

== History ==
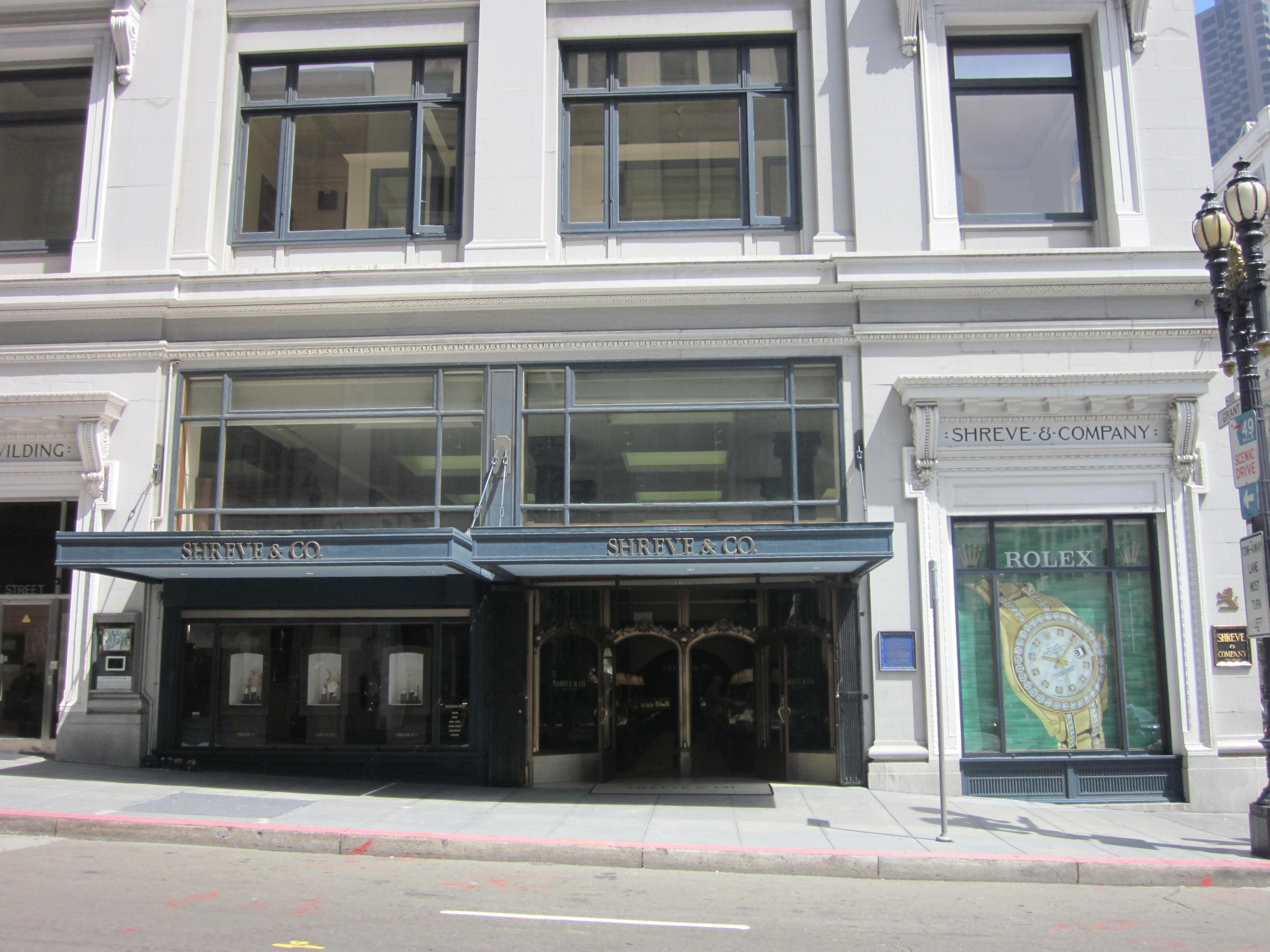
Shreve & Co. SF 1

Exploded gas tanks us mint

The company's precursor, The Shreve Jewelry Company, was established by Rodman's father and uncle, George and Samuel Shreve, who had moved to San Francisco from New York City. George learned goldsmithing from his older half-brother, Benjamin. The latter had established Shreve, Crump & Low in Boston.

By the 1880s, The Shreve Jewelry Company was considered among the finest silversmiths in the United States, selling high quality timepieces, gold, and silver jewelry, aside from diamonds and precious stones. The store, which had opened at Montgomery and Clay, soon moved to Market Street.

Just a month before the 1906 San Francisco earthquake, Shreve & Co. opened its new eleven-story building at Post and Grant. Built with the latest engineering technologies of its time, the Shreve & Co. building was one of a few San Francisco buildings that survived the April 18 earthquake. During the fire, silver and jewels were rushed into the fireproof vault by the staff where most of it remained unharmed, however, 3 weeks would pass before the safe was cool enough to open. With its building rendered unusable, the company opened shop in Oakland, where it stayed for two years. The company's first flatware products and illustrated catalogs were created at this time.

In 1992, Shreve & Co filed Chapter 11 bankruptcy (owned at the time by Birks Group of Canada) and was sold to The Schiffman Group in North Carolina and to Suna Bros Inc. in New York.

In March 1996, Shreve & Co. purchased San Francisco's Mobell Jewelry from Sidney Mobell.

In 2011, after more than a century of operating within California, the company launched its first store in Portland, Oregon, offering timepieces from A. Lange & Söhne, Baume & Mercier, IWC, Jaeger-LeCoultre, Officine Panerai, Patek Philippe, Rolex, Wellendorff and Vacheron Constantin.

In 2015, Shreve & Co lost their lease to Harry Winston due to rising rents around Union Square. They relocated further down to 150 Post St. In April 2022, Shreve & Co lost their Patek Philippe authorized dealer status. In June 2023, a customer sued Shreve & Co, alleging that its sales staff pressured him to spend $220,000 to be offered a chance to buy a Patek Philippe wristwatch, while concealing its imminent loss of authorized dealer status.

== Notable collections ==
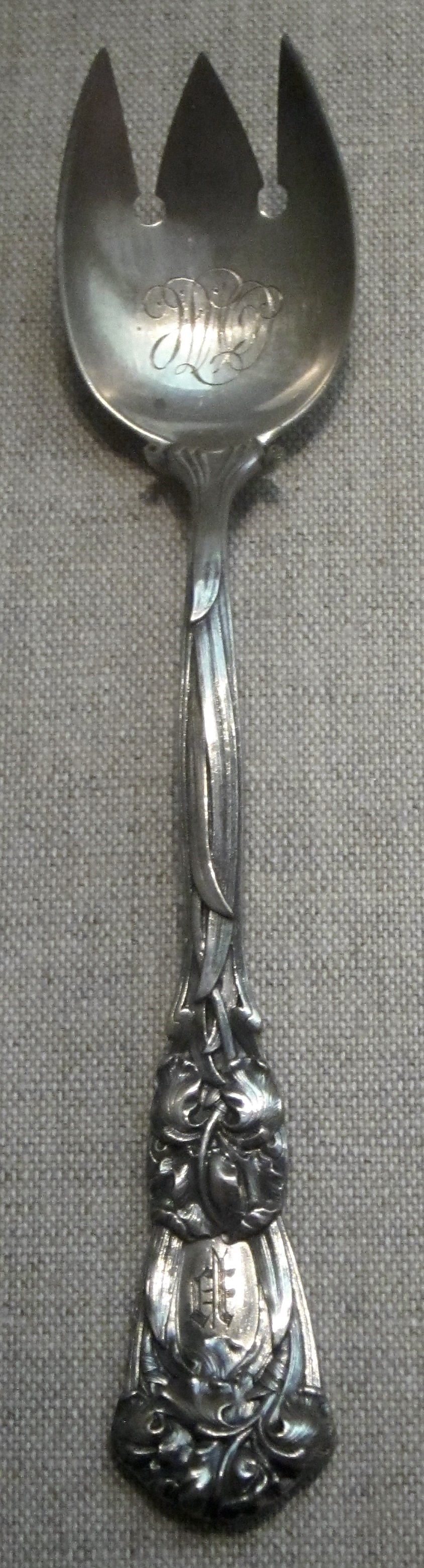
Ice cream fork, Shreve & Company, Iris service, silver, 1903-1917

- The de Young Museum has on exhibit Shreve & Co. silver, featuring a complete set of the Iris pattern, including flatware, candlesticks, serving bowls and centerpieces. Its archives houses over 1,600 of the Shreve & Co. factory drawings and photographs taken at the Shreve & Co. factory.
- The California Historical Society has the silver spade used by President William Howard Taft, and other objects from Shreve & Co., including the Mellon Tea Set, Silver Punch Bowl presentation piece, The Huntington Prize, 1899, a matching silver tray, a Horse Show prize dated 1899; silver medals, 1902, Mechanics Institute with presentation case.
- The San Francisco Museum and Historical Society has the silver spade used by San Francisco Mayor James Rolphe at the groundbreaking for city hall and the civic center, and other objects made by Shreve & Co.
- The Oakland Museum of California has a large collection of Shreve & Co. silver from the collection of the late Dr. Elliot Evans, curator of the Society of Pioneers, 1956–1971.
- The San Francisco Public Library main branch has on exhibit the silver trowel used for the Library groundbreaking by Mayor Rolphe, an original miniature spade and the original enclosure card, and the tower of jewels souvenir made by Shreve & Co.

== Gallery ==
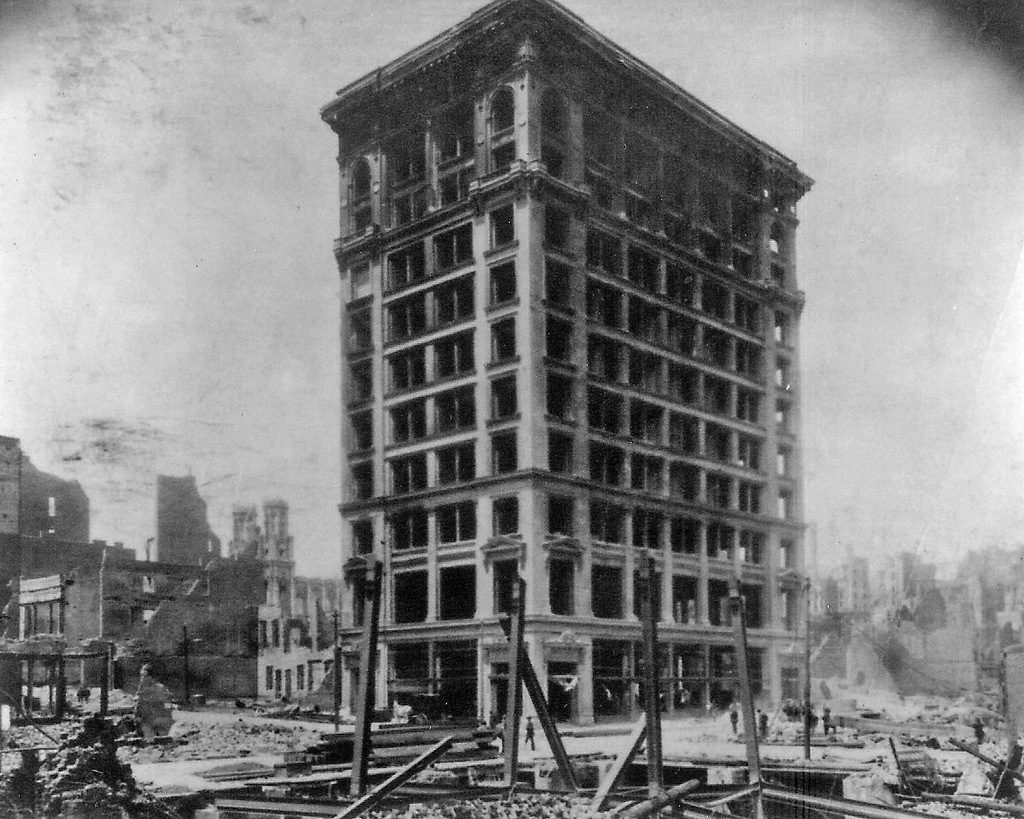
The Shreve Building stands amid the ruins of the 1906 San Francisco earthquake.

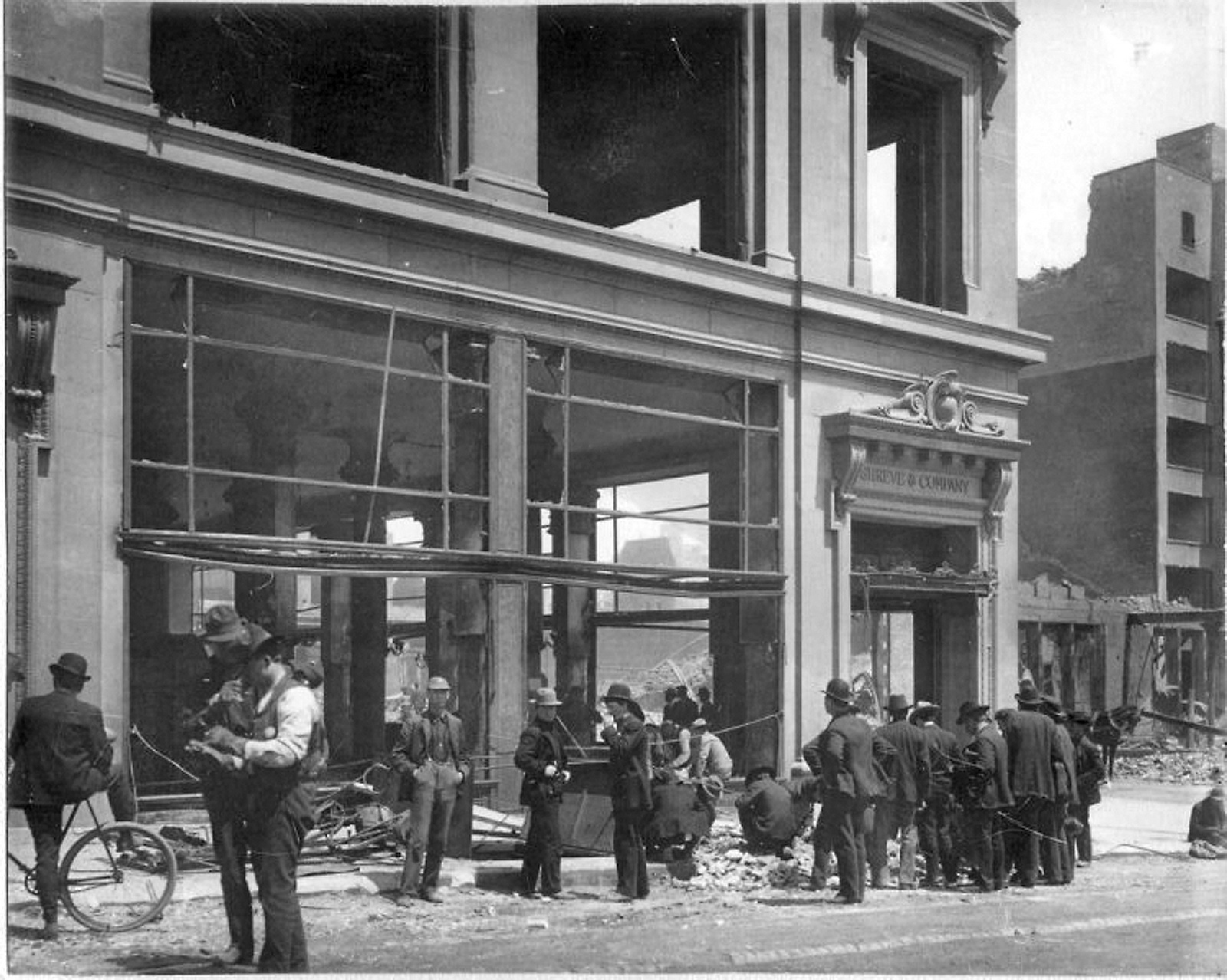
The facade of the Shreve Building during the 1906 San Francisco earthquake.

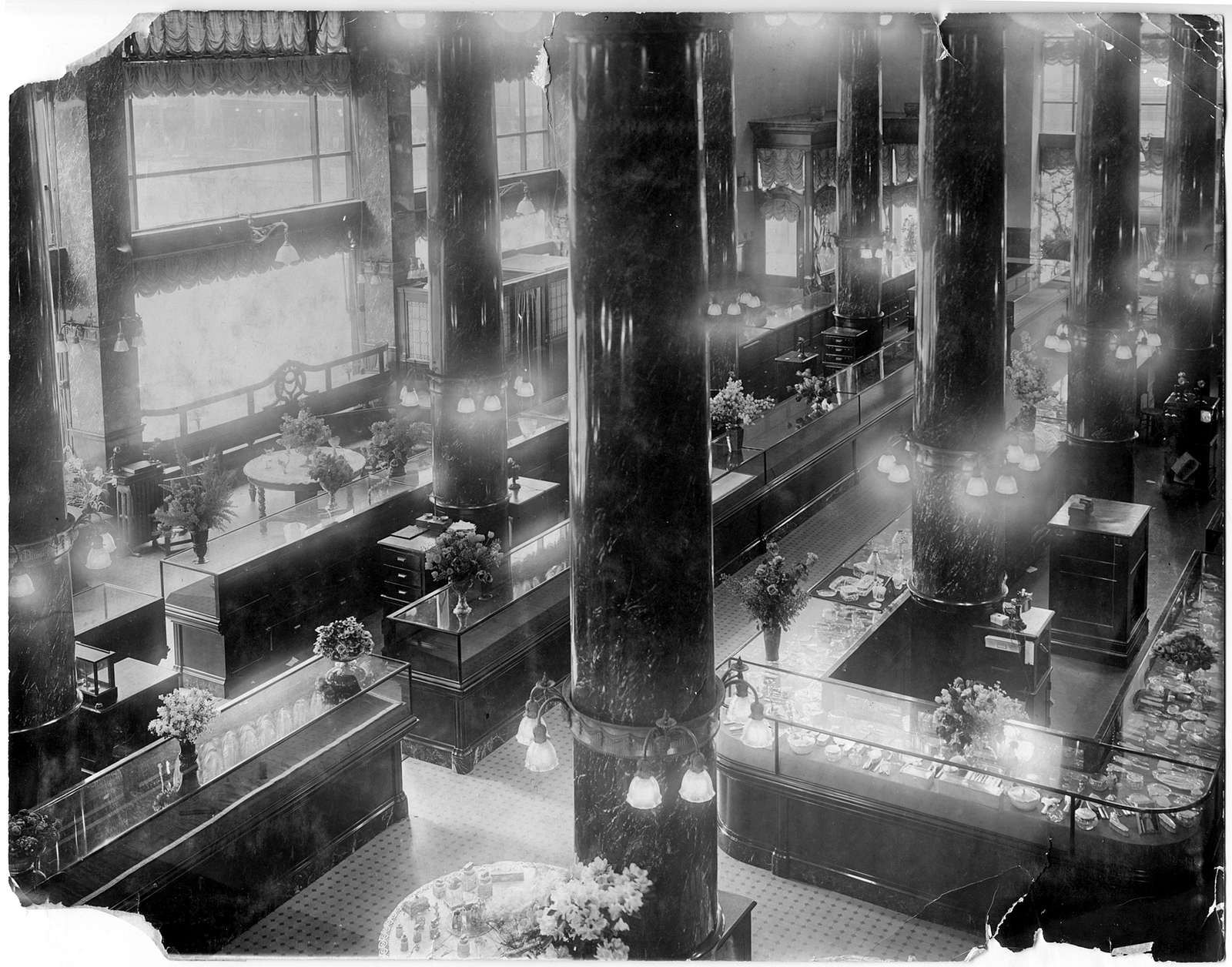
The interior of the Shreve & Company jewelry store in 1909.

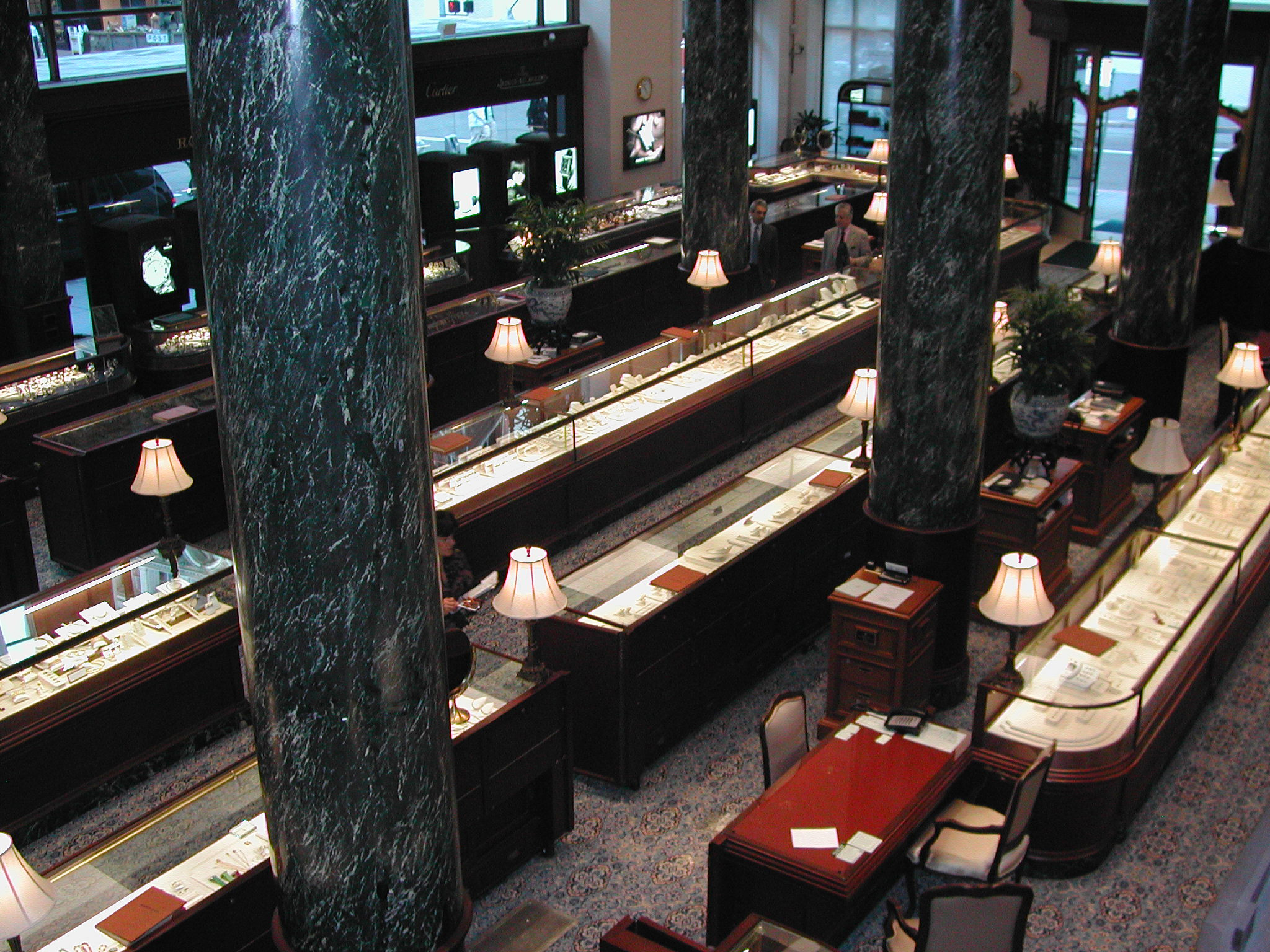
The current interior of the Shreve & Company retail store in San Francisco.
