= William D. M. Howard =

American businessman

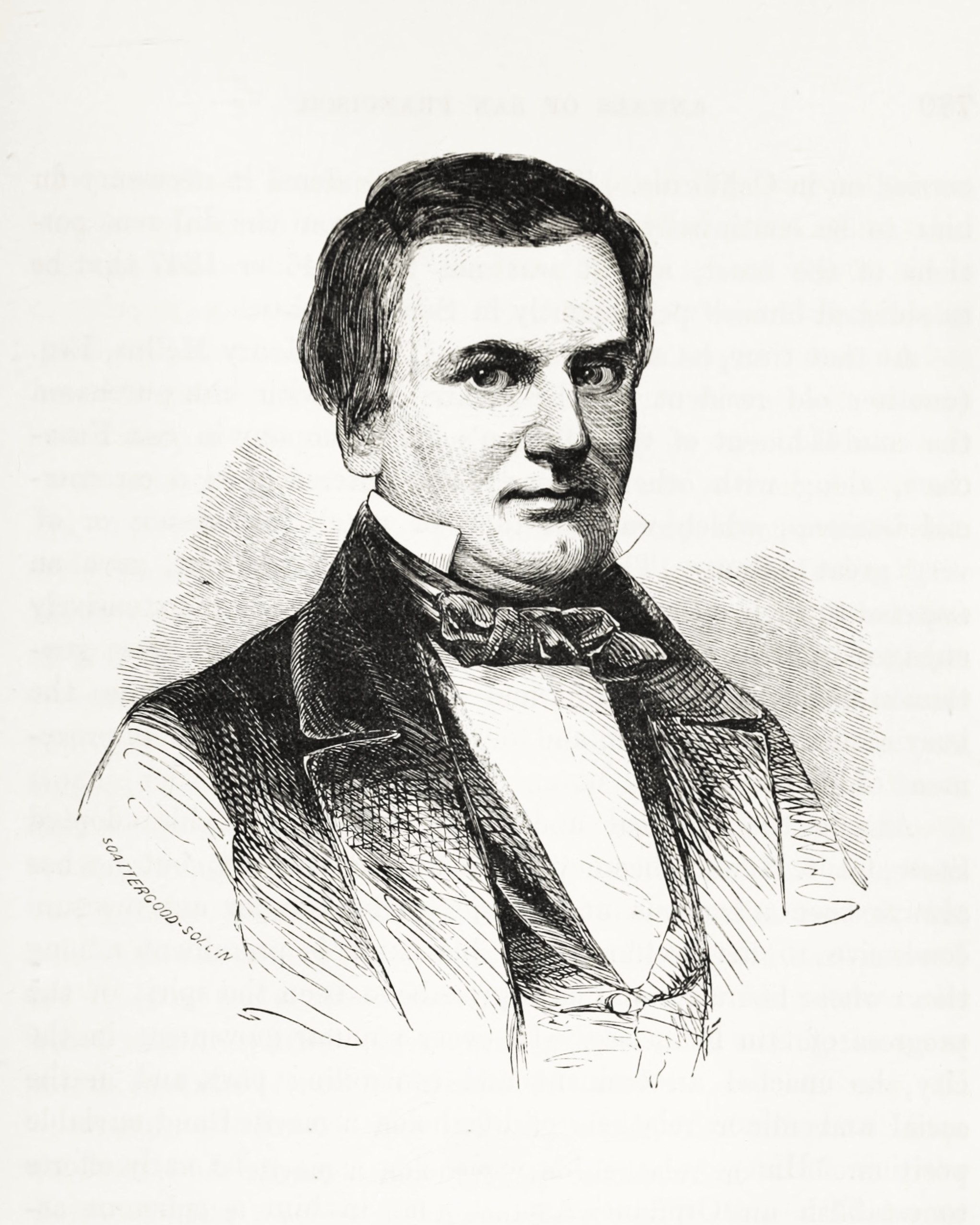
- Born: 1818; Boston, Massachusetts
- Died: 1856 (aged 37–38); California
- Spouse(s): Mary Warren, Agnes Poett

William Davis Merry Howard (1818–1856), known in Spanish as Don Guillermo Howard, was an American businessman, known as one of San Francisco's wealthiest men during the California Gold Rush.

Howard was a native of Boston, Massachusetts who came to California in 1839 as a cabin boy on a sailing ship. For several years he worked on ships trading hides and tallow along the Pacific coast. In 1845 he formed the San Francisco merchant business of Mellus & Howard.

== Early life ==
William Davis Merry Howard was a native of Boston and came to California in 1839 as cabin-boy on the ship California. He arrived at Monterey in the early part of 1839. The vessel then went to San Pedro; and Howard became clerk trading hides and tallow for Abel Stearns, who was then a merchant at Los Angeles. In 1840 Howard went home, via Mexico, to see his relatives, and returned to California in 1842.

== Mellus & Howard ==
In San Francisco in 1845 Howard formed a partnership with Henry Mellus, and in 1846 they bought the Hudson's Bay Company property on Montgomery street. The Hudson's Bay Company Yerba Buena (San Francisco) post had not been very profitable and William G. Rae, its local representative, recommended abandonment. The parent concern in England agreed to the sale and the firm of Howard & Mellus were the purchasers. In 1848 Mellus & Howard built on the southwest corner of Clay and Montgomery Street the first brick building in San Francisco, and transferred their business to this store. The sale had scarcely been consummated when the California gold rush began. The firm of Mellus & Howard became very wealthy. The partnership of the firm of Howard & Mellus continued until 1850, when Howard purchased his partner's interests in San Francisco.

== San Francisco public service ==
In 1847, Howard was elected a member of San Francisco's first city council and was a member of its "committee of three" which framed the code of laws adopted by the council. At the same time he continued his active interest in and support of public measures affecting general welfare. On the 16th of July, 1850, he presided over the meeting which resulted in the organization of a police force two hundred and thirty strong, to suppress The Hounds, who were terrorizing the city. In 1850 he organized and was captain of a military company primarily formed for the suppression of the squatter riots at Sacramento. Howard's company continued in existence with him as its commander for a number of years. He donated a building to the public school system of San Francisco and a building for a cholera hospital in 1851. In 1851 Howard, imported a Hunneman tub from Boston, presenting it to Fire Company 3, which adopted the name of the Howard Company and was so known until the volunteer fire department passed out of existence. In 1851, Howard was a member of the committee of fourteen citizens which passed resolutions and took steps that resulted in the formation of the Committee of Vigilants.

== Rancho San Mateo ==
The year 1853 found Howard with impaired health, and in the hope of regaining his health he embarked on a trip to Europe. Although he traveled for a year, leaving his business to the care of his younger brother, George H. Howard, he returned home without having recovered his health.

In 1854 he established his residence in a house he named "el Cerrito" on Rancho San Mateo, which he had previously purchased from the grantee Cayetano Arenas. Howard gave attention to his stock-breeding interests on his San Mateo ranch, and at the same time controlled his extensive interests in San Francisco, hoping that his twenty-one mile trips between his country place and the city would accomplish for him what European travel had not. The Howard block, between Clay and Commercial Streets, on Sansome Street was built with bulls' heads around the eaves. Howard planted many eucalyptus trees on his rancho.

== Family life ==
During his return to California in 1842, Howard married Mary Warren at the house of Captain Grimes in Honolulu. Mary Warren died in 1849, and Howard then married Agnes Poett, daughter of Dr. Joseph Henry Poett. They lived in a house and lot on the northeast corner of Stockton and Washington streets, until 1851. He then moved to Mission Street between Third and Fourth and built one of four cottages—of similar design and appearance. The others were constructed, one by George Mellus, one by Talbot H. Green and one by Samuel Brannan. Howard died in 1856, at the age of thirty-seven, leaving one son (William Henry Howard) by his second wife. Agnes Howard survived her husband and later married his brother, George H. Howard.

== Legacy ==
Howard Street in San Francisco was named for William D. M. Howard who is often called "the most public spirited man in early San Francisco". He was one of the first "councilmen" and gave generously to many civic causes.

Howard donated the land for Howard Presbyterian church in San Francisco, and his widow the land for the Episcopal Church of St. Matthew in San Mateo.
