= Timothy Francis McCarthy =

Timothy Francis McCarthy (born September 19, 1951) is a former financial services chief executive, a columnist, and author of The Safe Investor: How to Make Your Money Grow in a Volatile Global Economy.

== Early years ==
McCarthy grew up in the San Mateo/Burlingame area in northern California. He attended Aragon High School and Serra High School in San Mateo. He graduated from the University of California, Davis with a Bachelor of Arts in Economics and International Relations. McCarthy then graduated from Harvard University's Graduate School of Business as a Baker Scholar, Harvard's highest academic award.

== Career ==
McCarthy began his career in the financial services industry working at Merrill Lynch in New York from 1983 to 1987. He then moved onto Fidelity Investments in Boston, where he served as an executive from 1987 to 1994. While at Fidelity, McCarthy served as president of both the Fidelity Investment Advisor Group and the National Financial Institutional Services group, as well as director of International Brokerage Group.

McCarthy then worked as chief executive at Jardine Fleming Unit Trusts in Hong Kong from 1994 to 1995.

After a year at Jardine Fleming, McCarthy went to work at Charles Schwab in San Francisco, where he served as president for three years, until 1998. While at Schwab, McCarthy was one of the top three executives at the firm. Following his departure from Schwab, McCarthy spent the next 12 years in Asia, first serving as chairman at Good Morning Securities Group in Seoul, South Korea. After four years there, McCarthy spent eight years as chairman and CEO of Nikko Asset Management Co. in Tokyo.

McCarthy currently serves on the board of directors for Sherpa Digital Media.

=== Published works ===
McCarthy is the author of The Safe Investor: How to Make Your Money Grow in a Volatile Global Economy, published by Palgrave Macmillan in February 2014. He has also written articles for various trade publications and writes The Smart Investor column for U.S. News & World Report.

== Personal life ==
McCarthy earned a black belt in Kenpō karate when he was younger, and later ran a dojo in San Francisco. He has said that he used the philosophy he learned through karate and adapted it to his management style while working as a chief executive in the financial services industry.

== Bibliography ==
- The Safe Investor: How to Make Your Money Grow in a Volatile Global Economy, ISBN 978-1137279101, published by Palgrave Macmillan in February 2014
