= Northern California coastal forests =

Temperate coniferous forests ecoregion in northern California and southwestern Oregon

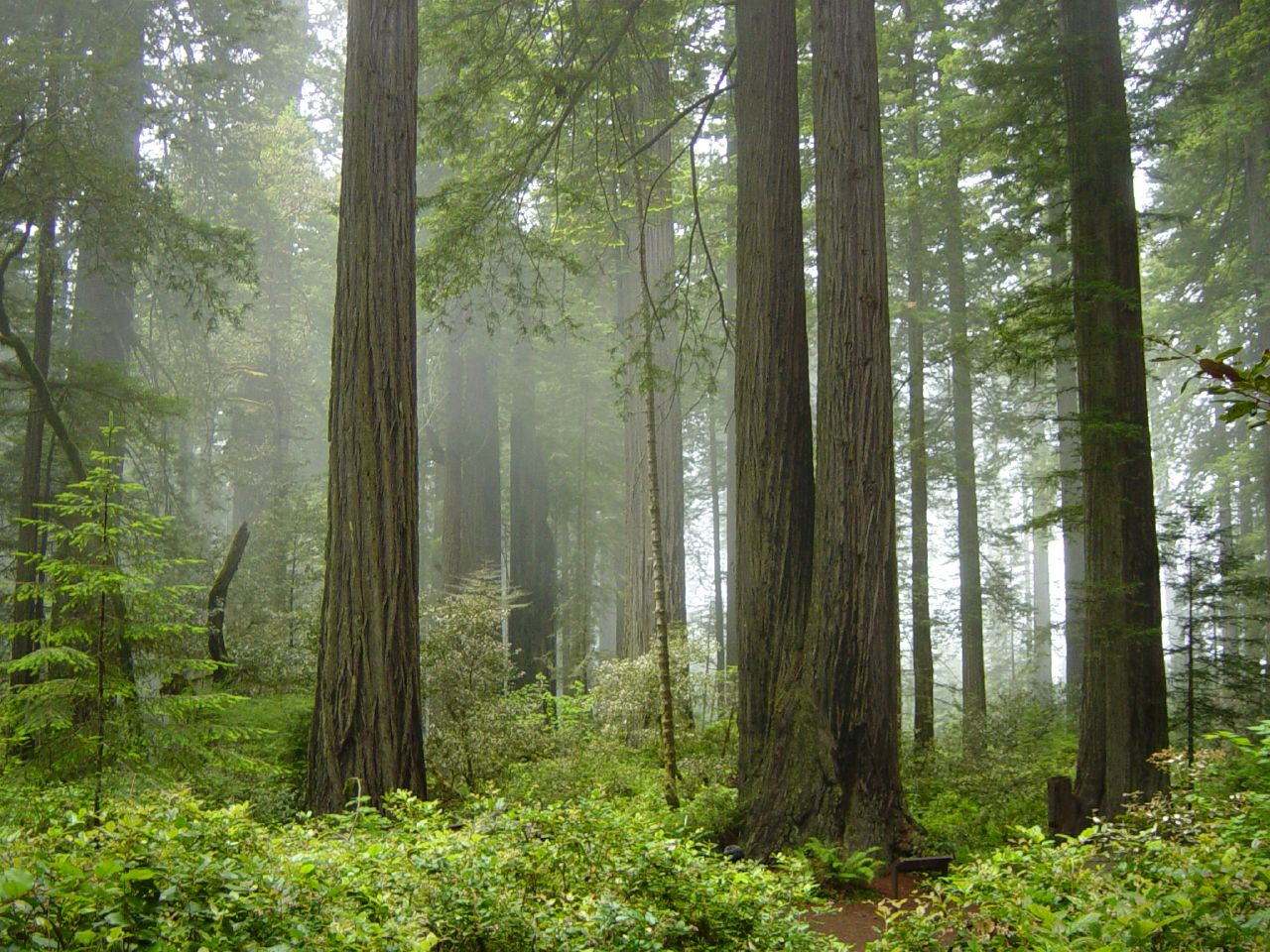
- Coast Redwood forest in Redwood National Park, California.

Ecology
- Realm: Nearctic
- Biome: Temperate coniferous forests
- Borders: California interior chaparral and woodlands; Central Pacific coastal forests; Klamath-Siskiyou forests
- Bird species: 232
- Mammal species: 77

Geography
- Area: 13,300 km^{2} (5,100 mi^{2})
- Country: United States
- States: California; Oregon
- Climate type: Mediterranean (Csb)

Conservation
- Conservation status: Critical/Endangered
- Habitat loss: 4.6828%
- Protected: 15.76%

The Northern California coastal forests are a temperate coniferous forests ecoregion of coastal Northern California and southwestern Oregon.

== Setting ==
The ecoregion covers 13,300 square kilometres (5,100 sq mi), extending from just north of the California-Oregon border south, to southern Monterey County. The ecoregion rarely extends more than 65 km inland from the coast, narrower in the southernmost parts of the ecoregion.

The ecoregion is a sub-ecoregion of the Pacific temperate rain forests ecoregion, which extends up the Pacific Coast to Kodiak Island in Alaska. The ecoregion lies close to the Pacific Ocean, and is kept moist by Pacific Ocean storms during the winter months and by coastal fogs in the summer months. These factors keep the ecoregion cooler in the summer and warmer in the winter, as compared to ecoregions further inland. The ecoregion is also defined by the distribution of the Coast Redwood (Sequoia sempervirens), with isolated groves located in protected canyons as far south as Redwood Gulch, in southern Monterey County. The greatest concentration of remaining Old-growth forest are in the northernmost portion of the ecoregion, primarily within Humboldt and Del Norte counties.

Major urban centers located within this ecoregion include the montane portions of various cities of the San Francisco Peninsula, Fort Bragg, Eureka, and Brookings.

== Habitats ==
=== Coastal redwood forests ===
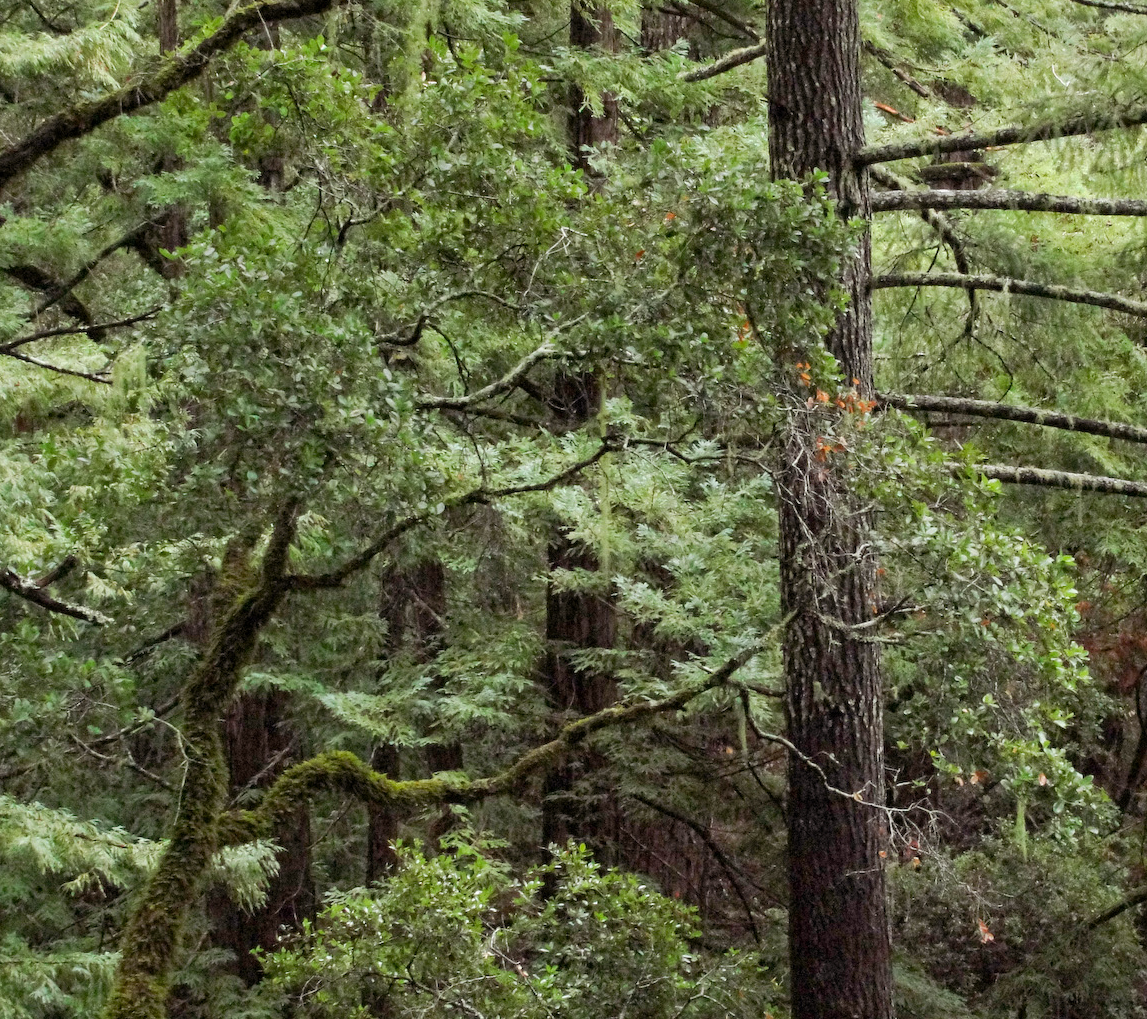
Notholithocarpus densiflorus, with Coast Douglas-firs Pseudotsuga menziesii subsp. menziesii and Coast Redwood behind in Sunset Trail, Big Basin Redwoods State Park, Santa Cruz Mountains, California.

Redwood forests are interspersed with several other plant communities throughout this ecoregion. The dominant forest type in this ecoregion is the coastal redwood forest. These are the tallest forests on Earth, with individual redwood (Sequoia sempervirens) trees reaching heights of 100 metres (330 ft). These forests are generally found in areas exposed to coastal fog. In the north, they occur on upland slopes, in riparian zones, and on riverine terraces. In the south, where annual precipitation is lower, they are constrained to coves and ravines. Coast Douglas-firs (Pseudotsuga menziesii var. menziesii) are nearly always associated with redwoods, but in the north the forests can also include Sitka spruce (Picea sitchensis), western hemlock (Tsuga heterophylla) and western red cedar (Thuja plicata). Like coast Douglas-fir, tanoak (Notholithocarpus densiflorus) is often present.

Other hardwoods include California bay laurel (Umbellularia californica), red alder (Alnus rubra), madrone (Arbutus menziesii), and bigleaf maple (Acer macrophyllum). The deep shade cast by redwoods often results in a sparse understory, but shade-tolerant species include thimbleberry (Rubus parviflorus), redwood sorrel (Oxalis oregana), elk clover (Aralia californica), dwarf Oregon grape (Mahonia nervosa), salal (Gaultheria shallon), and many ferns, such as deer fern (Blechnum spicant), sword fern (Polystichum munitum), and leathery polypody (Polypodium scouleri). Bracken ferns (Pteridium aquilinum) are also found in these forests.

=== Mixed evergreen forests ===
Mixed evergreen forests are found just inland of the redwood forests, on Franciscan Assemblage soils that receive moderate to high rainfall. The trees are a variety of needle-leaved and broad-leaved evergreen species. Characteristic trees include coast Douglas-fir (Pseudotsuga menziesii var. menziesii), canyon live oak (Quercus chrysolepis), tanoak (Notholithocarpus densiflorus), madrone (Arbutus menziesii), California bay laurel (Umbellularia californica), and golden chinquapin (Chrysolepis chrysophylla).

The shrub understory is dense and diverse; beaked hazel (Corylus cornuta), evergreen huckleberry (Vaccinium ovatum), Pacific rhododendron (Rhododendron macrophyllum), salal (Gaultheria shallon), Sadler's oak (Quercus sadleriana), dwarf Oregon-grape (Mahonia nervosa), and poison oak (Toxicodendron diversilobum) are typically found.

=== Closed-cone conifer forests and woodlands ===
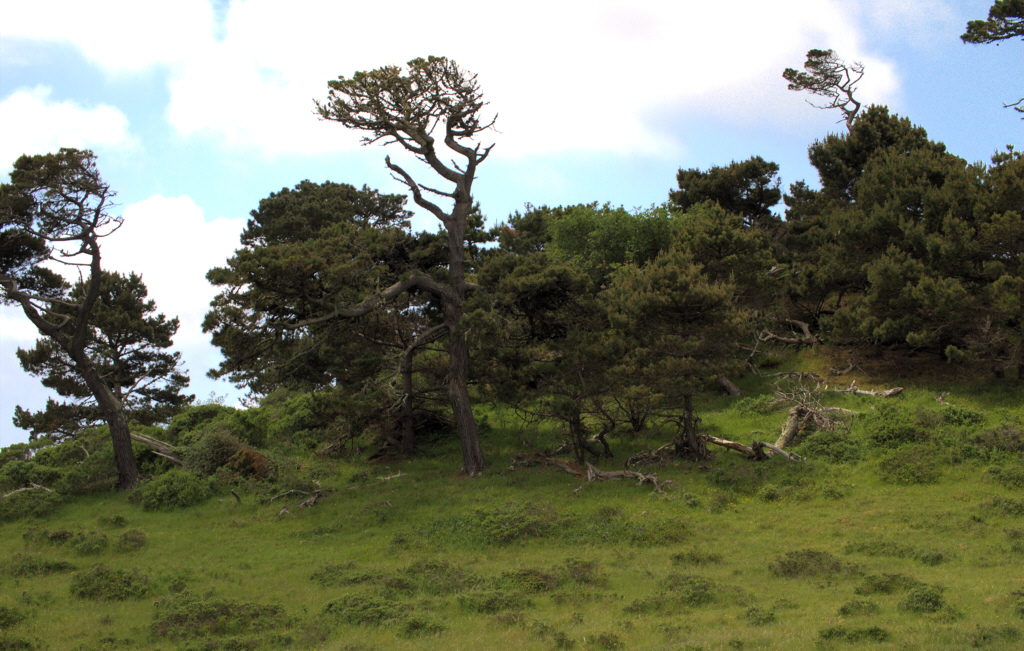
Pinus muricata forest growing at Point Reyes, California.

Closed-cone conifer forests are found in small, scattered patches throughout the ecoregion, typically adjacent to maritime chaparral. Common pines are lodgepole pine (Pinus contorta), bishop pine (Pinus muricata), Monterey pine (Pinus radiata), and knobcone pine (Pinus attenuata). These forests can also be home to several endemic cypresses, including Monterey cypress (Cupressus macrocarpa), Gowen cypress (Cupressus goveniana), and Santa Cruz cypress (Cupressus abramsiana). Shrub species include glossyleaf manzanita (Arctostaphylos nummularia), bog Labrador tea (Rhododendron groenlandicum), evergreen huckleberry (Vaccinium ovatum), salal (Gaultheria shallon), Pacific rhododendron (Rhododendron macrophyllum), and California bayberry (Myrica californica). Soil conditions sometimes cause these forests to take on a pygmy form. Lichens and mosses are diverse and can be abundant.

=== Maritime chaparral ===
Maritime chaparral is composed of a variety of shrubs that grow in the fog belt. Endemic species of manzanita (Arctostaphylos) and Ceanothus are locally common. Manzanita species include woolyleaf manzanita (Arctostaphylos tomentosa), glossyleaf manzanita (Arctostaphylos nummularia), Hooker's manzanita (Arctostaphylos hookeri), pajaro manzanita (Arctostaphylos pajaroensis), Montara manzanita (Arctostaphylos montaraensis), and others. Gasquet manzanita (Arctostaphylos hispidula) occurs in southern Oregon. Among Ceanothus, hairy ceanothus (Ceanothus oliganthus) is common, while Mason's ceanothus (Ceanothus masonii), Carmel ceanothus (Ceanothus griseus), and wart-stem ceanothus (Ceanothus verrucosus) are local endemics. Other widespread shrubs and trees include chamise (Adenostoma fasciculatum), California buckwheat (Eriogonum fasciculatum), black sage (Salvia mellifera), coffeeberry (Rhamnus californica), buckthorn (Rhamnus crocea), and coast live oak (Quercus agrifolia). This habitat is often found near closed-cone conifer forests and woodlands.

=== Coastal grassland ===
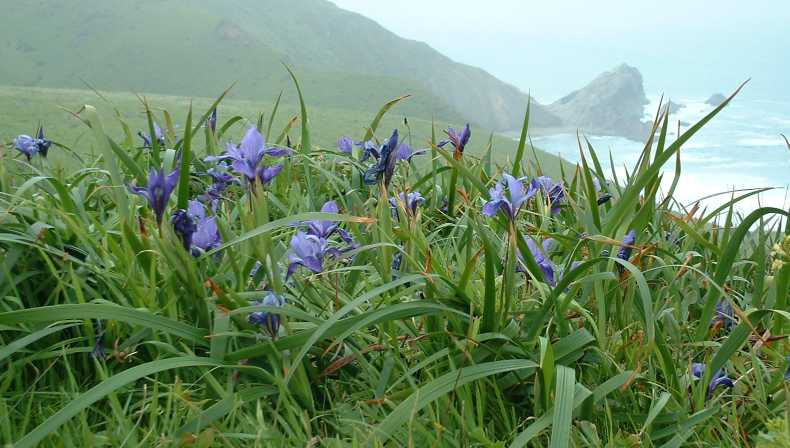
Iris douglasiana patch at Point Reyes.

Northern coastal grasslands, or coastal prairies, are generally found below 1,000 feet (300 m) on coastal terraces or mountain balds. In areas where fire has been suppressed, coastal scrub plants invade. Common grasses include bentgrass (Agrostis spp.), California brome (Bromus carinatus), Nootka reedgrass (Calamagrostis nutkaensis), California oatgrass (Danthonia californica), red fescue (Festuca rubra), Idaho fescue (Festuca idahoensis), tufted hair-grass (Deschampsia caespitosa), prairie Junegrass (Koeleria macrantha), tall trisetuem (Trisetum canescens). Common forbs include Douglas iris (Iris douglasiana), western blue-eyed grass (Sisyrinchium bellum), hairy gumplant (Grindelia hirsutula), and footsteps of spring (Sanicula arctopoides).

=== Coastal scrub ===
Northern coastal scrub consists of shrublands found at elevations below 1,500 feet (460 m) on bluffs, terraces, dunes, and hills near the coast. This habitat is often subject to wind and maritime fog. The shrubs are mostly evergreen, small-leaved, and sclerophyllous. Characteristic species include coyote brush (Baccharis pilularis), yellow bush lupine (Lupinus arboreus), blueblossom (Ceanothus thyrsiflorus), seaside woolly sunflower (Eriophyllum stoechadifolium), sticky monkey-flower (Mimulus aurantiacus), poison oak (Toxicodendron diversilobum), California blackberry (Rubus ursinus), thimbleberry (Rubus parviflorus), salmonberry (Rubus spectabilis), coffeeberry (Rhamnus californica), oceanspray (Holodiscus discolor), salal (Gaultheria shallon), cow parsnip (Heracleum maximum), and western sword fern (Polystichum munitum). Coastal grassland succeeds to coastal scrub in the absence of fire, and coastal scrub succeeds to mixed evergreen forest under further absence of fire.

=== Riparian woodlands and shrublands ===
Riparian woodlands and shrublands are a mosaic of tree-dominated plant communities and open shrublands found along rivers. Species composition varies with elevation, slope, floodplain width, and flooding history. Nevertheless, common trees include white alder (Alnus rhombifolia), red alder (Alnus rubra), box elder (Acer negundo), Fremont cottonwood (Populus fremontii), red willow (Salix laevigata), coast Douglas-fir (Pseudotsuga menziesii var. menziesii), California sycamore (Platanus racemosa), coast live oak (Quercus agrifolia), and bigleaf maple (Acer macrophyllum). Common shrubs include sandbar willow (Salix exigua) and arroyo willow (Salix lasiolepis).

=== Live oak woodlands and savannas ===
Live oak woodlands and savannas are dominated by coast live oak (Quercus agrifolia). Canopy cover varies from dense forest to open savannas. In forests, California blackberry (Rubus ursinus), creeping snowberry (Symphoricarpos mollis), toyon (Heteromeles arbutifolia), and poison oak (Toxicodendron diversilobum) are common in the understory.

=== Ponderosa pine forests ===
Some of the rarest forests that occurs in this coastal region are the Maritime Coast Range Ponderosa Pine forests, an example of which occurs in the Carbonera Creek watershed of Santa Cruz County, California. These forest are dominated by ponderosa pine (Pinus ponderosa).

== Protected areas ==
- Samuel H. Boardman State Scenic Corridor
- Tolowa Dunes State Park
- Patricks Point State Park
- Redwood National and State Parks
- Humboldt Redwoods State Park
- Headwaters Forest Reserve
- King Range
- Sinkyone Wilderness State Park
- South Fork Eel River Wilderness
- Jackson Demonstration State Forest
- Mendocino Headlands State Park
- Jenner Headlands Preserve
- Montgomery Woods State Reserve
- Van Damme State Park
- Manchester State Park
- Salt Point State Park
- Austin Creek State Recreation Area
- Grove of Old Trees
- Sonoma Coast State Beach
- Golden Gate National Recreation Area
- San Bruno Mountain State Park
- San Bruno Mountain Ecological Reserve
- Montara State Beach
- Rancho Corral de Tierra
- Mill Creek Redwood Preserve
- Miramontes Ridge Open Space Preserve
- Pulgas Ridge Open Space Preserve
- Edgewood County Park
- Teague Hill Open Space Preserve
- Wunderlich County Park
- El Corte de Madera Creek Open Space Preserve
- Tunitas Creek Open Space Preserve
- La Honda Creek Open Space Preserve
- Windy Hill Open Space Preserve
- La Honda Creek Open Space Preserve
- Palo Alto Foothills Park
- Los Trancos Open Space Preserve
- Monte Bello Open Space Preserve
- Skyline Ridge Open Space Preserve
- Stevens Creek County Park
- Saratoga Gap Open Space Preserve
- Long Ridge Open Space Preserve
- Sanborn Skyline County Park
- Castle Rock State Park
- Sam McDonald County Park
- Pescadero Creek County Park
- Pescadero State Beach
- Butano State Park
- Burleigh H. Murray Ranch
- Purisima Creek Redwoods Open Space Preserve
- Armstrong Redwoods State Reserve
- Big Basin Redwoods State Park
- Ano Nuevo State Reserve
- Henry Cowell Redwoods State Park
- Wilder Ranch State Park
- The Forest of Nisene Marks State Park
- Bear Creek Redwoods Open Space Preserve
- Portola Redwoods State Park

== See also ==
- List of ecoregions in the United States (WWF)
- Cedar hemlock douglas-fir forest
