= Memorial Park (San Mateo County, California) =

Park in San Mateo County, California

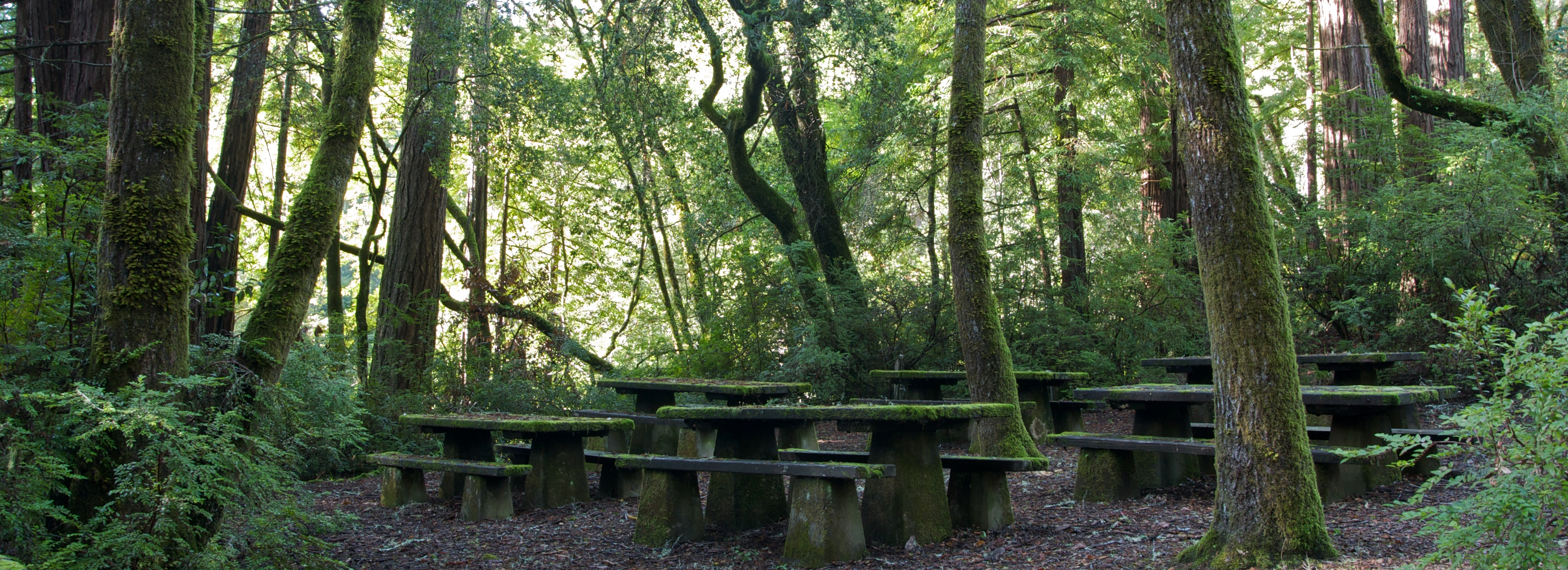
- Moss-covered tables, Huckleberry Flat picnic area

- Location within San Francisco Bay Area Location within California
- Type: Parkland
- Location: 9500 Pescadero Creek Road; Loma Mar, California
- Coordinates: 37°16′40″N 122°17′40″W
- Area: 673 acres (272 ha)
- Created: 1924
- Operator: San Mateo County, California
- Open: All year

Memorial Park, located in Loma Mar, San Mateo County, California, United States, is operated by the San Mateo County Department of Parks. The park encompasses 673 acres (2.72 km^{2}), and includes old-growth redwood trees, eight miles (13 km) of hiking trails, camping areas, picnic facilities, a visitor center, a camp store, a creek swimming area, and campfire programs. Pescadero Creek, which provides winter habitat for steelhead trout, runs through the park. Bloomquist, Hoffman, McCormick, and Peterson Creeks join Pescadero Creek within the park boundaries.

Memorial Park trails link to Pescadero Creek Park from the Hoffman Flat Trailhead along the Old Haul Road trail, which also links into Sam McDonald County Park, Portola Redwoods State Park, and Big Basin Redwoods State Park (via easement across private lands).

== History ==
In the early 20th century, the area that became Memorial Park was known as Camp Eden, an old-growth redwood forest in Harrison Canyon used as a roadside encampment by local residents, whose children attended the nearby Wurr School; San Mateo County Superintendent of Schools Roy W. Cloud is credited with initiating the preservation of the area after a visit to the Wurr School in spring 1923. Cloud was equally enchanted by the natural beauty and alarmed by its impending destruction; at the time, it had just been acquired by a lumber company which intended to harvest the trees. Cloud approached the San Mateo County Board of Supervisors, recommending the area be purchased and preserved as a park; the Board appointed a committee of prominent citizens to investigate the possibility, and the committee unanimously recommended preservation after their tour, comparing the site favorably with Big Basin. In total, 314 acres (127 ha) were acquired from the lumber company at a cost of US$70,000 (equivalent to $1,323,000 in 2025) in 1923.

Supervisor Thomas L. Hickey proposed that prominent trees in the newly acquired grove be named for the San Mateo County men who died in World War I; during the park's dedication ceremonies on July 4, 1924, the names of 52 men were read aloud to designate an identical number of redwood trees in Legion Flat. Bronze plaques were added later to each tree by local Boy Scouts.

The Boy Scouts were the first large-scale users of Memorial Park; they built the 11-acre (4.5 ha) Camp Pescadero in 1926 to accommodate up to 200 Scouts and partially dammed Pescadero Creek to form a large swimming area. During the Depression, a camp for approximately 300 workers of the Works Project Administration (WPA) was established within Memorial Park to build many amenities and structures. At the same time, a separate camp for approximately 150 runaway girls was also established on-site; the WPA men were responsible for logging while the women handled cooking and washing. WPA activities were largely completed by 1937, setting much of the park's present configuration.

== Amenities ==
Map of Memorial Park

Campgrounds at Memorial Park
Flat		Sites	Capacity
Azalea		158	1264
Sequoia		158	1264
Redwood		15	75
Wurr	#1	15	75
Wurr	#2	15	75

Memorial County Park is popular for overnight camping; all 300 campsites were occupied when it was dedicated on July 4, 1924, and on a typical summer night, more than 1,500 people are camping within the park. Starting in October 2019, the San Mateo County Parks Department began the first major renovation and upgrades to overnight camping facilities in the park since its opening in 1924.

There are 158 camp sites in the park, divided into named camp areas; the park also has day use areas, a visitor center, a camp store, and two campsites reserved for youth groups (Homestead Flat and Redwood Flat). Publicly-accessible amenities and campsites are south of Pescadero Creek Road; most of the hiking trails are in the hilly region north of the road.

Trails within the park include:

- Creek Trail – 1.2 miles (1.9 km)
- Homestead Trail – 0.9 miles (1.4 km)
- Mt. Ellen Nature Trail – 1.0 mile (1.6 km)
- Mt. Ellen Summit Trail – 1.6 miles (2.6 km)
- Pomponio Canyon Trail – 3.5 miles (5.6 km)
- Sequoia Trail – 0.7 miles (1.1 km)
- Tan Oak Nature Trail – 0.5 miles (0.80 km)
- Wurr Trail – 0.3 miles (0.48 km)

== Setting ==
Pescadero-Memorial Park Complex
1 Memorial Park
2 Sam McDonald
3 Heritage Grove Trail
4 Pescadero Creek
5 Portola Redwoods State Park
6 Big Basin Redwoods State Park

Today, the park is part of a larger group of county parks known as the Pescadero-Memorial Park Complex, formed by nearby land acquisitions:

1. Memorial Park (1924)
2. Sam McDonald County Park (acquired 1958, established 1970)
3. Heritage Grove Trail
4. Pescadero Creek County Park (acquired 1968)

They are adjacent to Portola Redwoods State Park and close to several areas preserved by the Midpeninsula Regional Open Space District, including the Russian Ridge Open Space Preserve and the Skyline Ridge Open Space Preserve.
