= Pescadero Creek County Park =

Park in San Mateo County, California

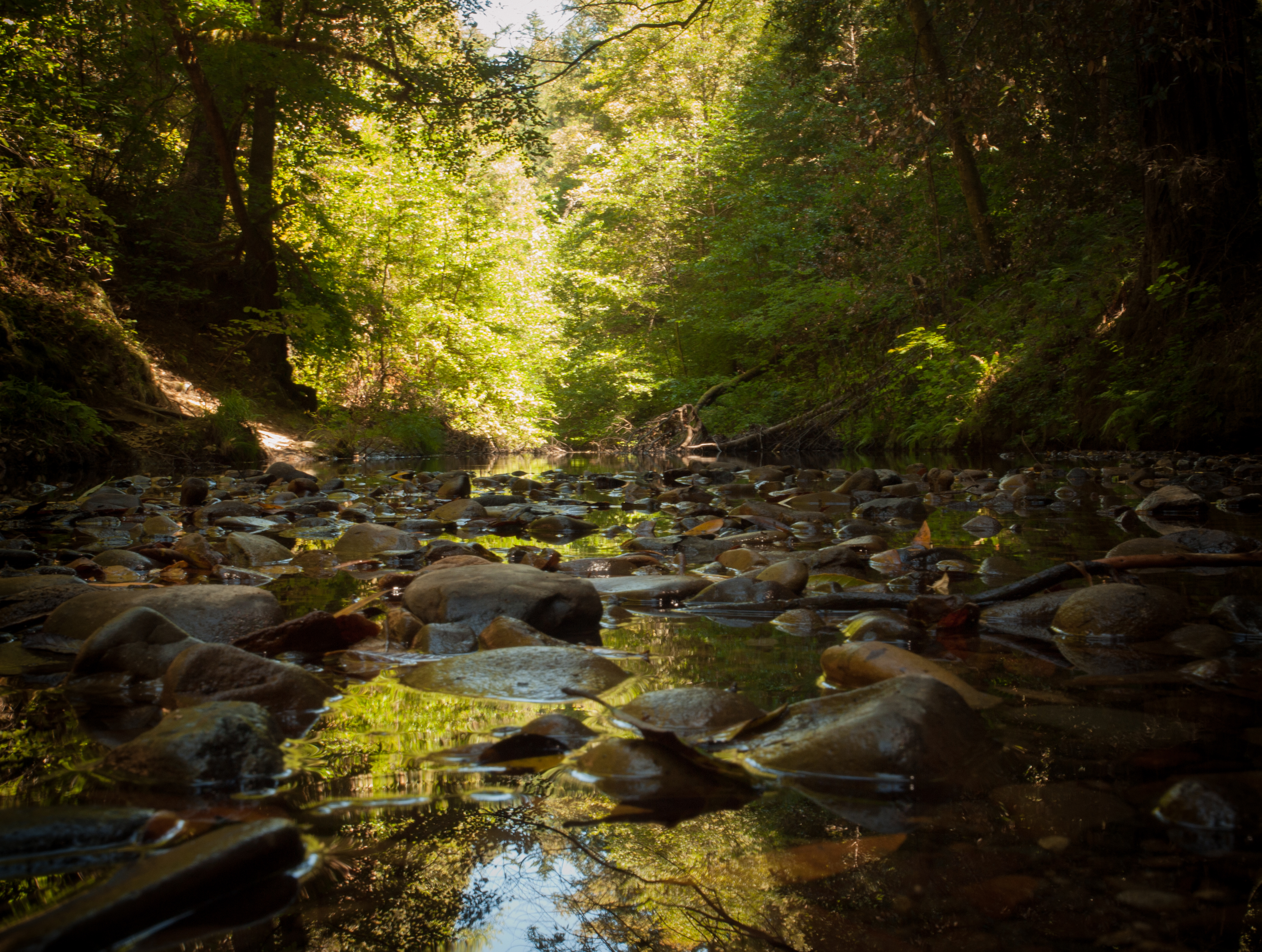
- Pescadero Creek County Park

- Location within San Francisco Bay Area Location within California
- Type: Parkland
- Location: 9500 Pescadero Creek Road Loma Mar, California
- Coordinates: 37°16′08″N 122°15′17″W
- Created: 1970
- Operator: San Mateo County Department of Parks
- Open: All year

Pescadero Creek Park, located near Loma Mar, San Mateo County, California, United States, is operated by the San Mateo County Department of Parks. The park complex of 8,020 acres (32.5 km^{2}) also includes the neighboring Memorial, Sam McDonald and Heritage Grove parks. The park borders Portola Redwoods State Park with seamless trails, and connects to Big Basin Redwoods State Park via a trail easement across private lands.

== History ==
In the 1970s, there was a plan to dam and flood the valley, but that was opposed by the general public. Then a plan by the county to develop the park with facilities such as campgrounds, visitor center, picnic grounds, trails and interpretive programs was also opposed and cancelled. The park is developed with basic campsites and trails developed originally by Scouts, plus the original logging roads now left as fire roads.

== Setting ==
Pescadero-Memorial Park Complex
1 Memorial Park
2 Sam McDonald
3 Heritage Grove
4 Pescadero Creek
5 Portola Redwoods State Park
6 Big Basin Redwoods State Park

The park is part of a larger group of county parks known as the Pescadero-Memorial Park Complex, formed by nearby land acquisitions:

1. Memorial Park (1924)
2. Sam McDonald County Park (acquired 1958, established 1970)
3. Heritage Grove Redwood Preserve
4. Pescadero Creek County Park (acquired 1968)

They are adjacent to Portola Redwoods State Park and close to several areas preserved by the Midpeninsula Regional Open Space District, including the Russian Ridge Open Space Preserve and the Skyline Ridge Open Space Preserve.

Pescadero Creek Park sits atop a deposit of natural gas and oil. Natural gas occasionally bubbles up through seams near Hoffman Creek producing a strong gas odor. Crude oil pools up in the channel of Tarwater Creek, and seeps into Jones Gulch Creek staining the rocks.

=== Pescadero Creek ===
The park is dominated by the Pescadero Creek, which provides winter habitat for steelhead trout, and a redwood forest with 26 miles of trails. Horseback riding is also popular here, and many use Jack Brook Horse Camp in San McDonald Park to connect. Hike-in camps are available to backpackers. Hiking trails that cross the Pescadero Creek do not have bridges (stepping stones provided), though the fire road crossings are bridged.

Tributaries of Pescadero Creek in this park are:

- Schenly Creek
- Towne Creek
  - Jones Gulch (San Mateo County)
- Harwood Creek
- Parke Gulch
- Dark Gulch
- Carriger Creek
- Keyston Creek
- Tarwater Creek
- Rhododendron Creek
- Wally's Creek
- Shingle Mill Creek
- Hooker Creek
- Fall Creek
- Iverson Creek
