= Sempervirens Fund =

Land trust in California

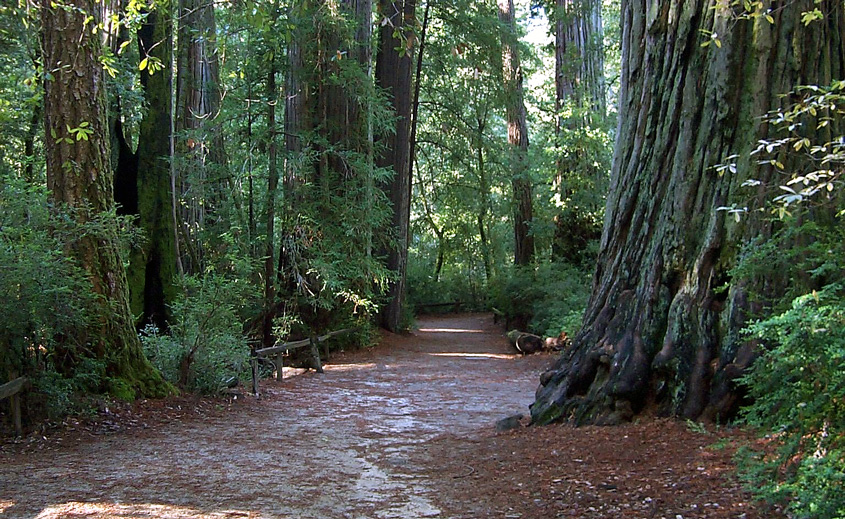
Big Basin Redwoods State Park

Sempervirens Fund, originally established in 1900 as Sempervirens Club, is California's oldest land trust. Founder Andrew P. Hill’s goal was to preserve the old-growth forest that became Big Basin Redwoods State Park, the first California state park in 1902. Sempervirens Fund's mission is to protect and permanently preserve coast redwood (Sequoia sempervirens) forests, wildlife habitat, watersheds, and other important natural features of California's Santa Cruz Mountains, and to encourage people to appreciate and enjoy this environment. Sempervirens Fund does this by purchasing land for protection and transferring it to state or local agencies. Sempervirens Fund has also worked to establish conservation easements and trail linkages between parks and coastal marine preserves. As of 2026, Sempervirens Fund has saved more than 36,000 acres of redwood lands.

== History ==
In 1899, San Jose photographer Andrew P. Hill was on assignment in Northern California's Santa Cruz Mountains. His photographs were to accompany a news story about a recent fire in the redwoods that had been put out using wine from a local vineyard. While Hill was photographing a very large redwood tree, the owner of the grove stopped him, accused Hill of trespassing and demanded the negatives. Hill refused, and though he had not thought of himself as a conservationist, returned to San Jose and started a campaign to save the coast redwoods of the Santa Cruz Mountains and make them accessible to the public.

At the time, logging of the coast redwoods was moving at a frantic pace to meet the demand for redwood lumber to build the new towns and cities of a booming California. Concerned that the redwood trees of the Santa Cruz Mountains would be lost forever, Hill, with the help of Stanford University's President David Starr Jordan, convened a meeting of scientists and other influential people at the Stanford University Library to discuss what could be done to protect the redwoods. At this meeting, a surveying committee was appointed, headed by Hill and Carrie Stevens Walter from the San Jose Woman's Club. They went camping along the banks of Sempervirens Creek in what is now Big Basin Redwoods State Park and then there formed the Sempervirens Club. The Club committed to lobby for the protection of the redwoods and for the creation of a public park at Big Basin. They passed a hat, collected $32 to finance their efforts, and launched a fundraising and lobbying campaign to achieve their goal.

For over two years, the Sempervirens Club members campaigned for the creation of a state redwood park in the Santa Cruz Mountains. Skillful lobbying by Hill, Santa Clara College (now Santa Clara University) President Father Robert E. Kenna, S.J., San Francisco attorney D.M. Delmas, and Harry Wells, editor of the San Jose Mercury News, convinced the California Legislature to pass a bill in 1901 allowing for the creation of the park. In 1902 the efforts of the Sempervirens Club paid off; the state acquired 3,800 acres of ancient redwood forests in Big Basin for the people of California—preserving coast redwoods for the first time anywhere. California Redwood Park, later named Big Basin Redwoods State Park, was the first park established in California in the current state park system.

To celebrate the success of their conservation efforts, the Club presented "The Soul of Sequoia, A Forest Play". The play, which features four episodes (a dance, a cantata, an opera, and a drama) and references to Classical forest nymphs to represent untameable wildness, is one of the earliest examples of eco-theater in the United States.

The Sempervirens Club continued to work to protect other redwood forest lands adjacent to Big Basin. The club envisioned the establishment of a much "greater park" that substantially expanded the boundaries of Big Basin. Their goals included acquiring the privately owned parcels within the natural boundaries of the Big Basin area and extending the park westward to the coast so that Big Basin would become, in the words of Andrew P. Hill, "one great playground for the people of California and the world."

By 1968, Big Basin Redwoods State Park was indeed a great recreation area that received high public use. More than 7,000 campers had been turned away the previous year for lack of room. At the same time, the area was being threatened with severe ecological damage from subdivision and development on over 750 acres of private land in key locations within the boundaries of the Waddell Creek watershed. Recognizing that Big Basin would remain threatened unless the greater regional ecology was preserved, a group of local conservationists, including Tony Look, Dorothy Varian, Howard King, George Collins, and Doris Leonard, joined together to work toward protecting the entire Waddell Creek watershed and establishing a new state park at Castle Rock, 14 miles northeast of Big Basin. The group renewed the charter of the original Sempervirens Club and changed the name to Sempervirens Fund to reflect its new emphasis as a fundraising organization. Castle Rock State Park was completed in 1968. In 1976, the fund acquired 1,600-acre Rancho del Oso at Waddell Beach, preserving the Waddell Creek watershed and transferring the property to expand Big Basin Redwoods State Park.

== Recent Efforts ==
Through the years, the redwood conservation movement has grown considerably but Sempervirens Fund remains the only organization devoted exclusively to permanently protecting the coast redwood forests of the Santa Cruz Mountains. Sempervirens Fund's largest transaction—acquisition of the 8,532-acre CEMEX property near the town of Davenport, since named San Vicente Redwoods—was completed in 2011 in partnership with the Land Trust of Santa Cruz County, The Nature Conservancy, Peninsula Open Space Trust, and Save the Redwoods League.

Sempervirens Fund continues to protect redwood forest lands in the Santa Cruz Mountains, providing critical habitat, watershed protection, and opportunities for public recreation and inspiration. Sempervirens Fund's guiding vision is to create a "Great Park"—an area of protected lands spanning San Mateo, Santa Cruz, and Santa Clara Counties. The Great Park would connect Big Basin Redwoods, Butano, Portola Redwoods, Año Nuevo, and Castle Rock State Parks, along with Pescadero Creek County Park, Long Ridge, and Saratoga Gap Open Space Preserves, Sanborn County Park, Coast Dairies State Park, Wilder Ranch State Park, and Henry Cowell Redwoods State Park.

Since the 2020 CZU Wildfire, California State Parks teams and partners including Sempervirens Fund have performed extensive cleanup, restoration, and redevelopment at Big Basin Redwoods State Park.
