= Sam McDonald County Park =

Park in San Mateo County, California

Sam McDonald Park
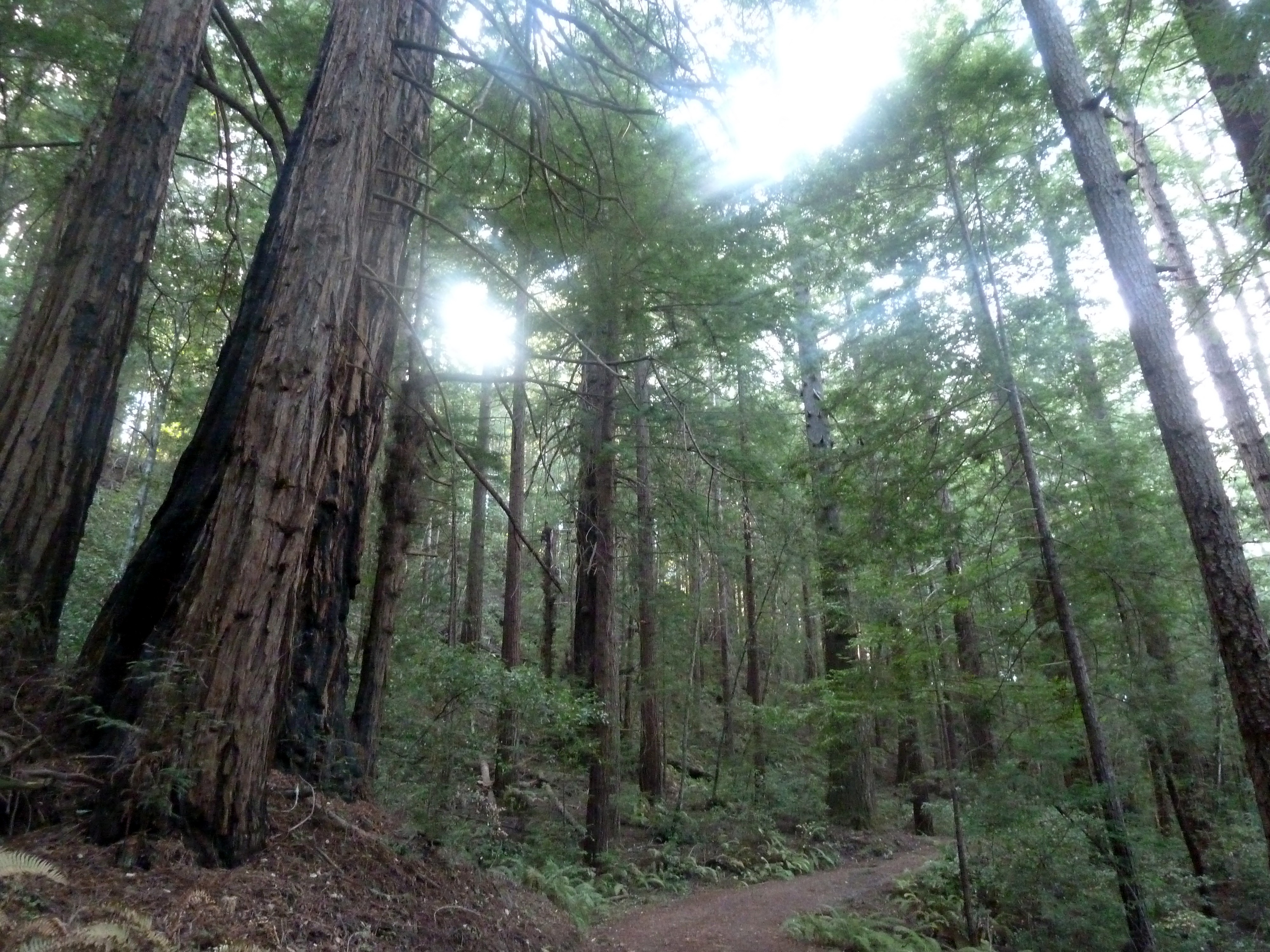
- Redwood forest in Sam McDonald County Park

- Location within San Francisco Bay Area Location within California
- Type: Parkland
- Location: 13435 Pescadero Creek Road; Loma Mar, California
- Coordinates: 37°17′48″N 122°15′56″W
- Area: 867 acres (351 ha)
- Created: 1970
- Operator: San Mateo County, California
- Open: All year

Sam McDonald Park, located between La Honda and Loma Mar in San Mateo County, California, United States, is operated by the San Mateo County Department of Parks. The park is 867 acres (3.51 km^{2}) of redwood forest, mixed woods and open meadows. Trails climb up to a ridgeline with views across the Pescadero Creek valley, Butano Ridge, and the Pacific Ocean. The park includes Heritage Grove and borders Pescadero Creek County Park through which it connects to Memorial County Park, Portola Redwoods State Park, and Big Basin Redwoods State Park (via a trail easement across private lands). Horseback riding is popular here, and many use Jack Brook Horse Camp. Part of the natural area is old-growth forest and recognized by the Old-Growth Forest Network.

== History ==
Emanuel B. (Sam) McDonald was born on January 1, 1884, in Monroe, Louisiana, the fifth of seven children born to Rev. Peter Bird McDonald and the former Priscilla Wheatley; his grandparents had been slaves. The family moved to southern California in 1890 to farm sugar beets, then moved to Gilroy in 1897, and finally Washington state in 1900. At this point, McDonald was reluctant to leave California, and decided to separate from his family in Canyon City, Oregon, returning to California in October 1900, booking passage on the steamer Modoc from Sacramento to San Francisco. While spending the winter in San Francisco, McDonald worked as an artist's model and later joined the crew of the Modoc, where he worked until May 1901.

After leaving the Modoc, McDonald booked passage to Alviso on the steamer San Jose; while deciding whether to continue on to Gilroy, he traveled to Mayfield to pursue an opportunity to drive horses for the Palo Alto Stock Farm. By 1903, he began working at Stanford. McDonald first encountered Alpine Creek and the redwood forest near La Honda in August 1917 during a vacation with his boss, Mr. Behrens. McDonald began acquiring the La Honda property in 1919, where he built a lodge he called Chee-Chee-Wa-Wa; he later named his holdings the La Honda-Alpine-Ytaioa Reserve.

After his death in November 1957, he bequeathed the La Honda property, by then exceeding 400 acres (160 ha), to Stanford; San Mateo County acquired the land in 1958 for $67,000 and created Sam McDonald Park in 1970. An additional 450 acres (180 ha) were acquired in 1976 from Kendall B. Towne, bringing the total acreage of the park to 867 acres (351 ha). The park was listed on the National Register of Historic Places in 2026.

== Setting ==
Pescadero-Memorial Park Complex
1 Memorial Park
2 Sam McDonald
3 Heritage Grove Redwood Preserve
4 Pescadero Creek
5 Portola Redwoods State Park
6 Big Basin Redwoods State Park

The park is part of a larger group of county parks known as the Pescadero-Memorial Park Complex, formed by nearby land acquisitions:

1. Memorial Park (1924)
2. Sam McDonald County Park (acquired 1958, established 1970)
3. Heritage Grove Redwood Preserve
4. Pescadero Creek County Park (acquired 1968)

They are adjacent to Portola Redwoods State Park and close to several areas preserved by the Midpeninsula Regional Open Space District, including the Russian Ridge Open Space Preserve and the Skyline Ridge Open Space Preserve.

Sam McDonald Park is divided into two halves approximately by Pescadero Road: 400 acres (160 ha) in the northwest, largely forested with redwood trees, and 450 acres (180 ha) in the southeast, open ridge and grassy knolls. Heritage Grove Redwood Preserve lies to the east of the southeastern half of Sam McDonald Park, and has 37 acres (15 ha) of old-growth redwood forest along Alpine Creek.
