= Tarwater =

Tarwater may refer to:

- Tar water, a medieval medicine
- Tarwater (band), a German music duo
- Tarwater Creek, a small river in San Mateo County, California, USA
- Davis Tarwater (born 1984), American swimmer
- Sean Tarwater (born 1969), American politician
- Francis Tarwater, the main character in The Violent Bear It Away by Flannery O'Connor
