= Little Boulder Creek =

Location
- Country: United States
- State: California
- Region: San Mateo County, San Mateo County

Physical characteristics
- Source: Santa Cruz Mountains
  - location: 7 miles (11 km) northwest of Boulder Creek, California
  - coordinates: 37°12′33″N 122°12′19″W
- Mouth: Pescadero Creek
  - location: 7 miles (11 km) north of Boulder Creek, California
  - coordinates: 37°13′7″N 122°11′7″W
  - elevation: 587 ft (179 m)

Little Boulder Creek is an eastward-flowing stream in the Santa Cruz Mountains of California. Rising in Santa Cruz County near Big Basin Redwoods State Park, it crosses into San Mateo County and empties into Pescadero Creek.

== See also ==
- List of watercourses in the San Francisco Bay Area
