= Iverson Creek =

River in California, United States

Coordinates: 37°14′43″N 122°12′50″W

Iverson Creek is a small river in San Mateo County, California and is a tributary of Pescadero Creek. It flows about 0.6 miles (1 km) from its source on Butano Ridge in Pescadero Creek County Park to its mouth in Portola Redwoods State Park.
