= Waterman Creek =

- Location of the mouth within California

Location
- Country: United States
- State: California
- Region: San Mateo County

Physical characteristics
- Source: Santa Cruz Mountains
  - location: 7 miles (11 km) west of Saratoga, California
  - coordinates: 37°14′47″N 122°9′15″W
- Mouth: Pescadero Creek
  - location: 7 miles (11 km) north of Boulder Creek, California
  - coordinates: 37°12′52″N 122°10′33″W
  - elevation: 643 ft (196 m)

Waterman Creek is a 3.0-mile-long (4.8 km) southward-flowing stream in southern San Mateo County, California. Rising near Big Basin Way and the Santa Cruz County line, it empties into Pescadero Creek.

In 2008, a conservation organization awarded $32,000 to the San Mateo County Farm Bureau to fund removal of a 12-foot (3.7 m) high, 100-year-old log dam that was preventing steelhead from accessing potential spawning grounds in the upper reaches of the creek.

== See also ==
- List of watercourses in the San Francisco Bay Area
