= Bloomquist Creek =

Stream in San Mateo County, California, U.S.

Coordinates: 37.272999°N 122.29747°W

Bloomquist Creek is a stream in San Mateo County, California, and is a tributary of Pescadero Creek. It enters Pescadero Creek within the boundaries of Memorial Park. It enters Pescadero Creek closer to coordinates 37.273067, 122.300517, which is not as depicted on typographical maps and current Google maps. A shingle mill was once located on the creek near the crossing of Wurr Road in Loma Mar, California.

== Notes ==
- U.S. Geological Survey Geographic Names Information System: Bloomquist Creek

== See also ==
- List of watercourses in the San Francisco Bay Area
