= Butano Creek =

Butano Creek Arroyo del Butano
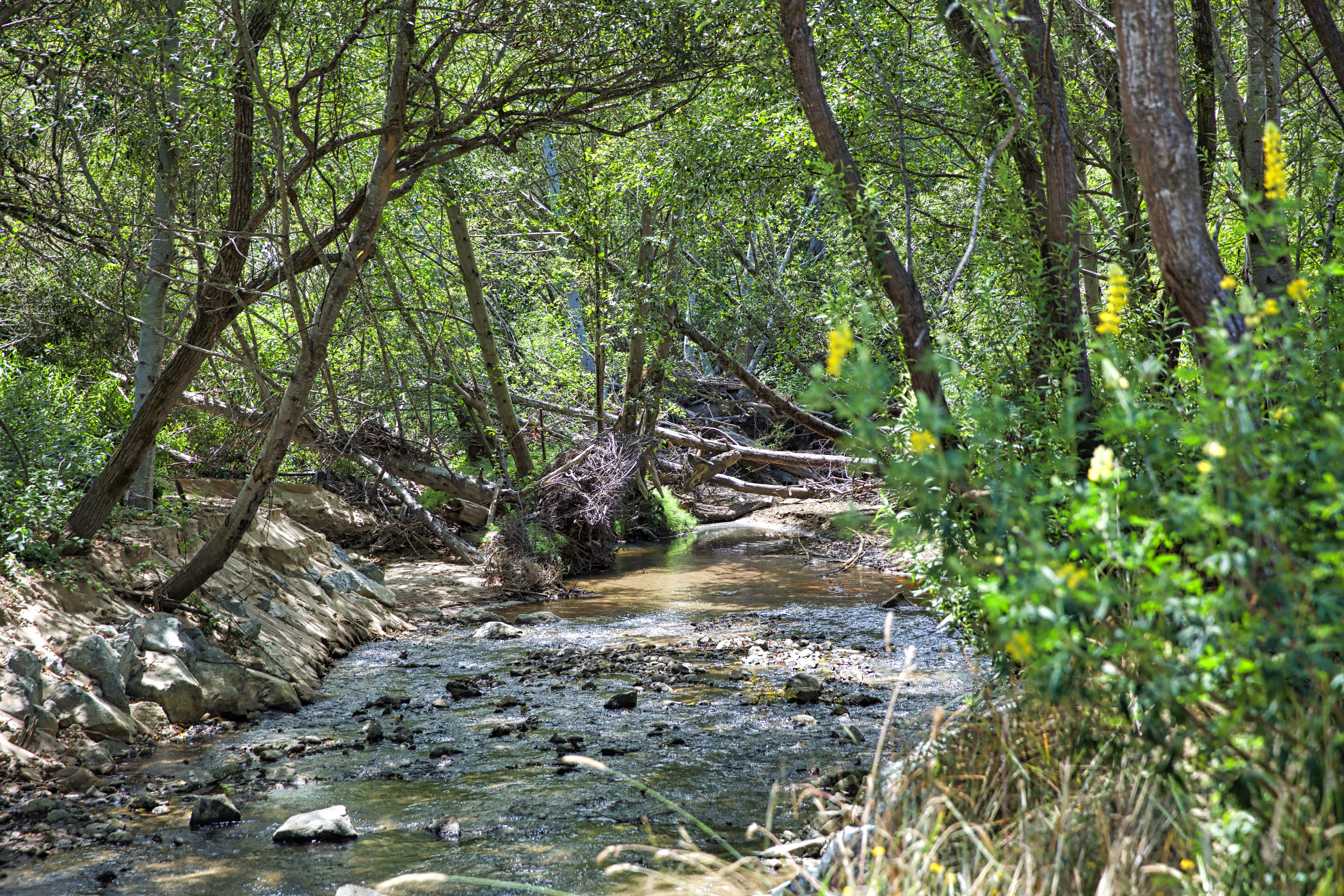
- A portion of the Butano Creek Restoration Project, located above Pescadero, California. USFWS Photo/Steve Martarano.

Location
- Country: United States
- State: California
- Region: San Mateo County

Physical characteristics
- Source: South of Butano Ridge at China Grade in the Santa Cruz Mountains
  - coordinates: 37°13′00″N 122°13′25″W
  - elevation: 2,120 ft (650 m)
- Mouth: Pescadero Creek in Pescadero Marsh
  - location: Pescadero, California
  - coordinates: 37°16′01″N 122°24′43″W
  - elevation: 0 ft (0 m)

Butano Creek /ˈbjuː.tə.noʊ/, /ˈbuː-/ name is a 15 miles (24 km) stream in San Mateo County, California, and carries a large amount of the runoff of the Santa Cruz Mountains into the Pacific Ocean after joining the Pescadero Creek delta at Pescadero Marsh in San Mateo County, California.

== History ==
According to Frances M. Molera, a butano is what the early Californians called a drinking cup made from the horn of a bull or other animal. Padre Jaime Escudet made the first recorded mention of El Butano on July 7, 1816, and Arollo del Butano is shown on a diśeno of the San Antonio or Pescadero land grant of 1833. A land grant called El Butano was made in 1838 and 1844 and mentions a Bolsa del Butano.

== Watershed and Course ==
Butano Creek's origin in the Santa Cruz Mountains is just above the San Mateo County and Santa Cruz County line at a bend in China Grade Road at the south end of Butano Ridge. It is first joined from the left (heading downstream) by South Fork Butano Creek, then on the left by Little Butano Creek at the intersection of Canyon Road and Cloverdale Road. Little Butano Creek is almost entirely protected by Butano State Park.

== Ecology and Conservation ==
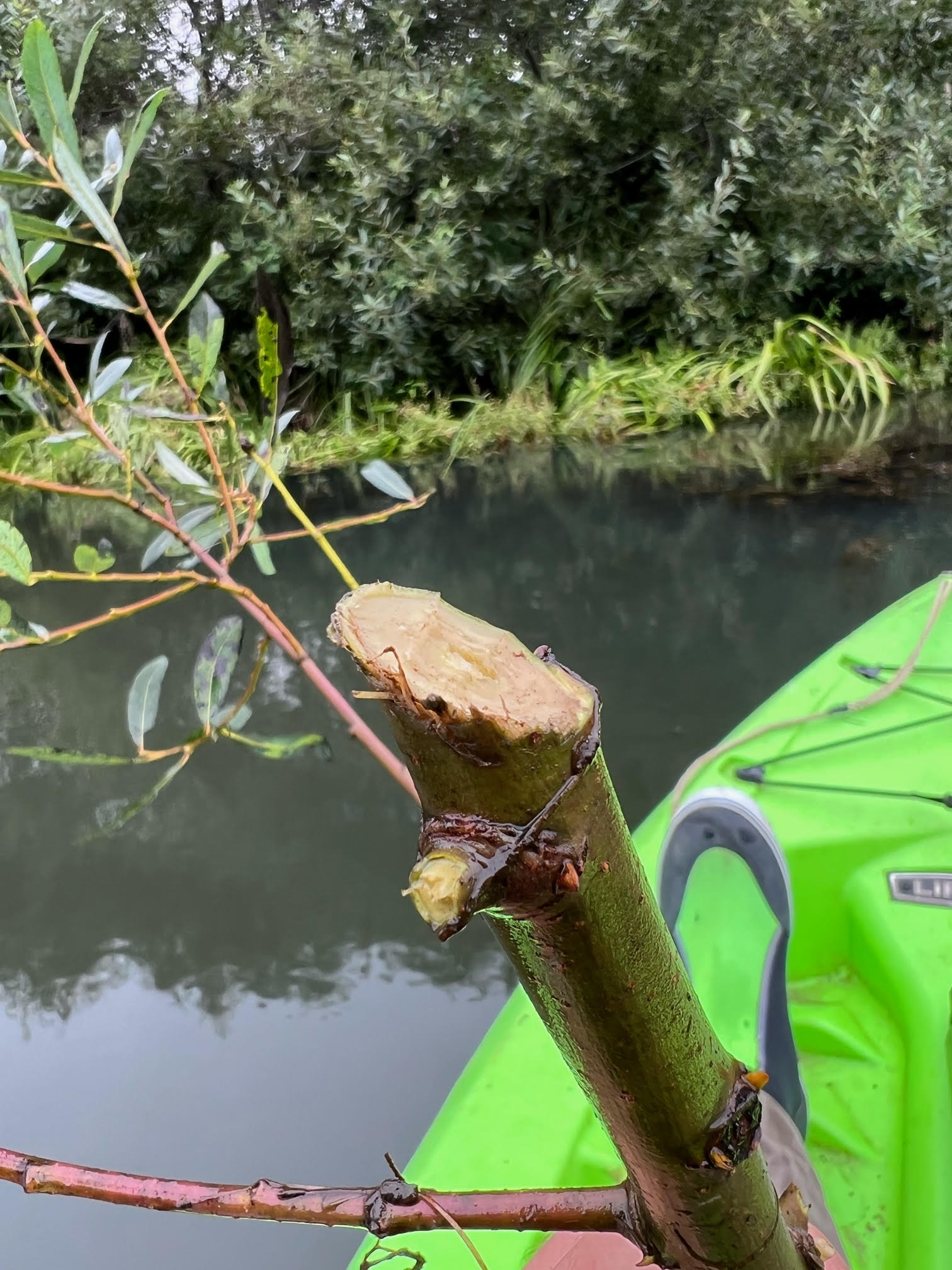
Beaver-chewed willow branch in newly restored channel of Butano Creek. Photo taken September 25, 2022, courtesy of Troy Guy.

Butano Creek was historically used by spawning steelhead trout (Oncorhynchus mykiss) and coho salmon (Oncorhynchus kisutch) but not coho were returning to either Butano or Pescadero Creeks by 2003, when 17,000 hatchery-raised coho were released into Pescadero Creek. However, only three of their descendants were counted in 2015. Although a few carcasses have been found in Pescadero Creek in recent years, the species is considered functionally extinct in the Butano watershed.

Siltation from cleared coast redwood (Sequoia sempervirens) and coast Douglas-fir (Pseudotsuga menziesii var. menziesii) forests began in 1923, when the Santa Cruz Lumber Co. built a sawmill over Pescadero Creek and lumberjacks cleared the pristine forests. Farms along the two creeks also led to runoff of silt and by the early 1990s a solid block of silt separated upper Butano Creek from the lower portion of the stream. With the creek disconnected from its natural course, almost annually roads and farmland were flooded, and backed up waters often reached homes in the town of Pescadero, 2 miles (3.2 km) away, where residents often had to stack sandbags.

In 2019 the San Mateo County Resource Conservation District led a $7 million project with California State Parks to dredge 4,000 feet of Butano Creek, reconnecting it to its natural floodplain and removing the silt plug which has been a barrier to salmonid passage. North American beaver (Castor canadensis) quickly moved into the restored channel in pursuit of its lush riparian vegetation (see photo of beaver sign from September 25, 2022).

== Recreation ==
Camp Butano Creek is a Girl Scout camp nestled in the wooded foothills of the Santa Cruz Mountains in San Mateo County. The camp is located outside the town of Pescadero and backs up to Butano State Park.

== See also ==
- List of watercourses in the San Francisco Bay Area
