= Newell Gulch =

Valley in California, United States

Coordinates: 37.257166°N 122.341639°W

Newell Gulch is a valley in San Mateo County, California. It contains a stream which is a tributary of Pescadero Creek.

== See also ==
- List of watercourses in the San Francisco Bay Area
