= Honsinger Creek =

Stream in California, United States

Coordinates: 37.252166°N 122.370529°W

Honsinger Creek is a 3.6-mile-long (5.8 km) stream in San Mateo County, California, and a tributary of Pescadero Creek.

== Tributaries ==
- Big Chicken Hollow
- Little Chicken Hollow
- Windmill Gulch

== See also ==
- List of watercourses in the San Francisco Bay Area
