= Roy Gulch =

Valley in California, United States

Coordinates: 37.261333°N 122.334416°W

Roy Gulch is a valley in San Mateo County, California, containing a small stream that is a tributary of Pescadero Creek.

== See also ==
- List of watercourses in the San Francisco Bay Area
