= Slate Creek (Pescadero Creek tributary) =

River in the United States of America

Coordinates: 37.238555°N 122.203577°W

Slate Creek is a small river in San Mateo County, California, and is a tributary of Pescadero Creek.

== See also ==
- List of watercourses in the San Francisco Bay Area
