= Shaw Gulch =

Valley in California, United States

Coordinates: 37°16′47″N 122°22′39″W

Shaw Gulch is a valley in San Mateo County, California. It contains a stream which flows about 1.5 miles (2 km) from its source. The stream's waters drain into Bradley Creek about 1.5 miles (2 km) north of the town of Pescadero.
