= Oil Creek (San Mateo County, California) =

Physical characteristics
- Mouth
  - coordinates: 37.229111°N 122.191910°W

Oil Creek is a small river in San Mateo County, California and is a tributary of Pescadero Creek.

== See also ==
- List of watercourses in the San Francisco Bay Area
