= Bradley Creek (California) =

River in California, United States

Coordinates: 37.253278°N 122.388585°W

Bradley Creek is a river in San Mateo County, California, and is a tributary of the Pescadero Creek.

== Tributaries ==
- Chandler Gulch
- Shaw Gulch

== See also ==
- List of watercourses in the San Francisco Bay Area
