= Big Chicken Hollow =

Valley in San Mateo County, California

Geography
- Location: San Mateo County, California, United States
- Coordinates: 37.28172°N 122.34520°W
- Rivers: Honsinger Creek
- Interactive map of Big Chicken Hollow

Big Chicken Hollow is a valley in San Mateo County, California, United States. It contains a fork of Honsinger Creek, a tributary of Pescadero Creek.

== See also ==
- Little Chicken Hollow
- List of watercourses in the San Francisco Bay Area
