= Santa Cruz Mountains =

Mountain range in California, United States

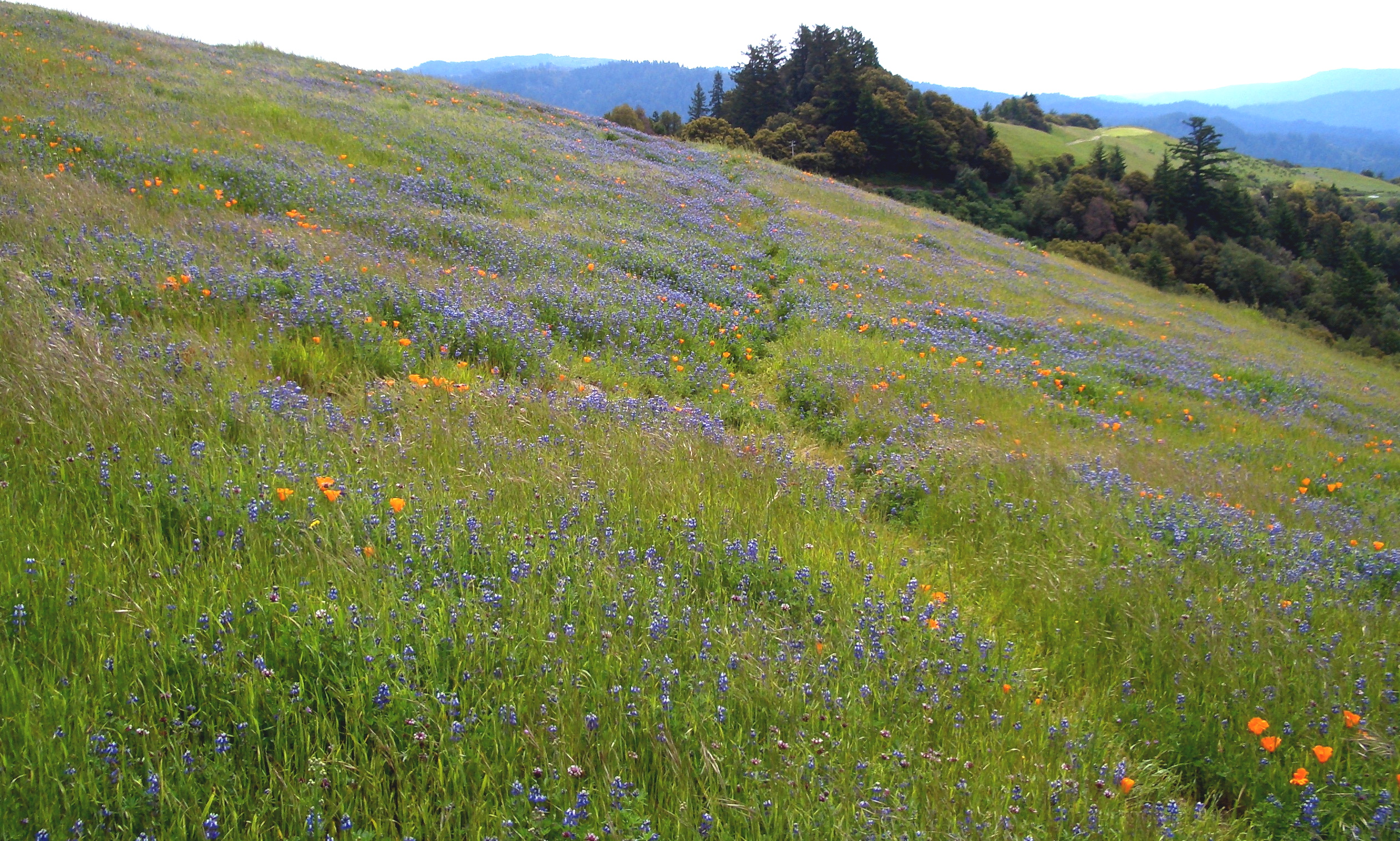
- Wildflowers in the Russian Ridge Open Space Preserve

Highest point
- Peak: Loma Prieta Peak
- Elevation: 3,786 ft (1,154 m)
- Coordinates: 37°06′40″N 121°50′39″W

Geography
- Location within California
- Country: United States
- State: California
- Range coordinates: 37°7′N 121°51′W
- Parent range: Pacific Coast Ranges

The Santa Cruz Mountains (Note: Mutsun Ohlone: Mak-sah-re-jah, "Sharp Ridged Mountain of the Eagle" or "People of the Eagle Mountain") are a mountain range in central and Northern California, United States, constituting a part of the Pacific Coast Ranges. They form a ridge down the San Francisco Peninsula, south of San Francisco. They separate the Pacific Ocean from the San Francisco Bay and the Santa Clara Valley, and continue south to the Central Coast, bordering Monterey Bay and ending at the Salinas Valley. The range passes through the counties of San Mateo, Santa Clara, and Santa Cruz, with the Pajaro River forming the southern boundary.

== Geography ==
The northernmost portion of the Santa Cruz Mountains, north of Half Moon Bay Road (SR 92), is known as Montara Mountain; the middle portion is the Sierra Morena, which includes a summit called Sierra Morena, and extends south to a gap at Lexington Reservoir; south of the gap, the mountain range is known as the Sierra Azul.

The highest point in the range is Loma Prieta, 11 miles (18 km) west of Morgan Hill, with a height of 3,786 feet (1,154 m), near the epicenter of the 1989 Loma Prieta earthquake. Other major peaks include Mount Umunhum at 3,486 feet (1,063 m), Mount Thayer at 3,479 feet (1,060 m), Mount Bielawski at 3,231 feet (985 m), El Sombroso at 2,999 feet (914 m), Eagle Rock at 2,488 feet (758 m), Black Mountain at 2,812 feet (857 m), and Sierra Morena at 2,417 feet (737 m). The San Andreas Fault runs along or near the ridge line throughout the range. The interior east side of the mountains drops abruptly towards this fault line, especially near the towns of Woodside and Saratoga.

For much of the San Francisco Peninsula, State Route 35 (SR 35) runs along the ridge, and is known as "Skyline Boulevard", while Interstate 280 runs east of the ridges. The major routes across the mountains are (from north to south): SR 92 from Half Moon Bay to San Mateo, SR 84 from San Gregorio to Redwood City, SR 9 from Santa Cruz to Saratoga, SR 17 from Santa Cruz to Los Gatos, SR 152 from Watsonville to Gilroy, SR 129 from Watsonville to San Juan Bautista, and US Highway 101 from Salinas to Gilroy. Meanwhile, SR 1 runs parallel to the mountains from Daly City to Castroville while SR 85 runs parallel from Cupertino to San Jose.

There are over 30 wineries located in this region and the Santa Cruz Mountains have been a legally defined American Viticultural Area (AVA) since 1981. Wine has been produced here since at least the 1840s. The Santa Cruz Mountain AVA emerged as a premier producer of top wines as recognized in the historic Judgment of Paris wine competition on May 24, 1976.

== Geology ==
The Santa Cruz Mountains are largely the result of compressive uplift caused by a leftward bend of the San Andreas Fault. The Salinian Block basement rocks are overlain by Miocene rock strata of the Lompico Sandstone, the Vaqueros Sandstone and the Santa Margarita Formation.

== Ecology ==
The Santa Cruz Mountains are a region of great biological diversity, encompassing cool, moist coastal ecosystems as well as warm, dry chaparral. Much of the area in the Santa Cruz mountains is temperate rainforest. In valleys and moist ocean-facing slopes some of the southernmost coast redwoods grow, along with coast Douglas-fir. Coast live oak, Pacific madrone, Pacific wax myrtle, big leaf maple, California bay laurel, and California black oak also occur in the Santa Cruz Mountains. There are several small and isolated stands of old-growth forest, most notably at Henry Cowell Redwoods and Portola Redwoods State Parks and one sizeable old-growth redwood forest at Big Basin. At higher elevations and on sunny south slopes a more drought-resistant chaparral vegetation dominates: manzanita, California scrub oak, chamise, and chaparral pea. The rare sandhills habitat supports disjunct populations of Ponderosa pine and several endemic species of plants, including Santa Cruz cypress, silverleaf manzanita, and Santa Cruz wallflower. Spring wildflowers are also widespread throughout the range.

The area has a tremendous number of bird species. (See: bird list). Black-tailed deer, a subspecies of mule deer are common, as are western gray squirrels, chipmunks and raccoons. Periodic sightings of black bears indicate they frequent the mountains or wander north from Big Sur, where black bears are established. Foxes, coyotes, bobcats, cougars and human-introduced Virginia opossums also inhabit the region but are rarely seen. Rattlesnakes are also inhabitants, mostly in the high, dry chaparral.

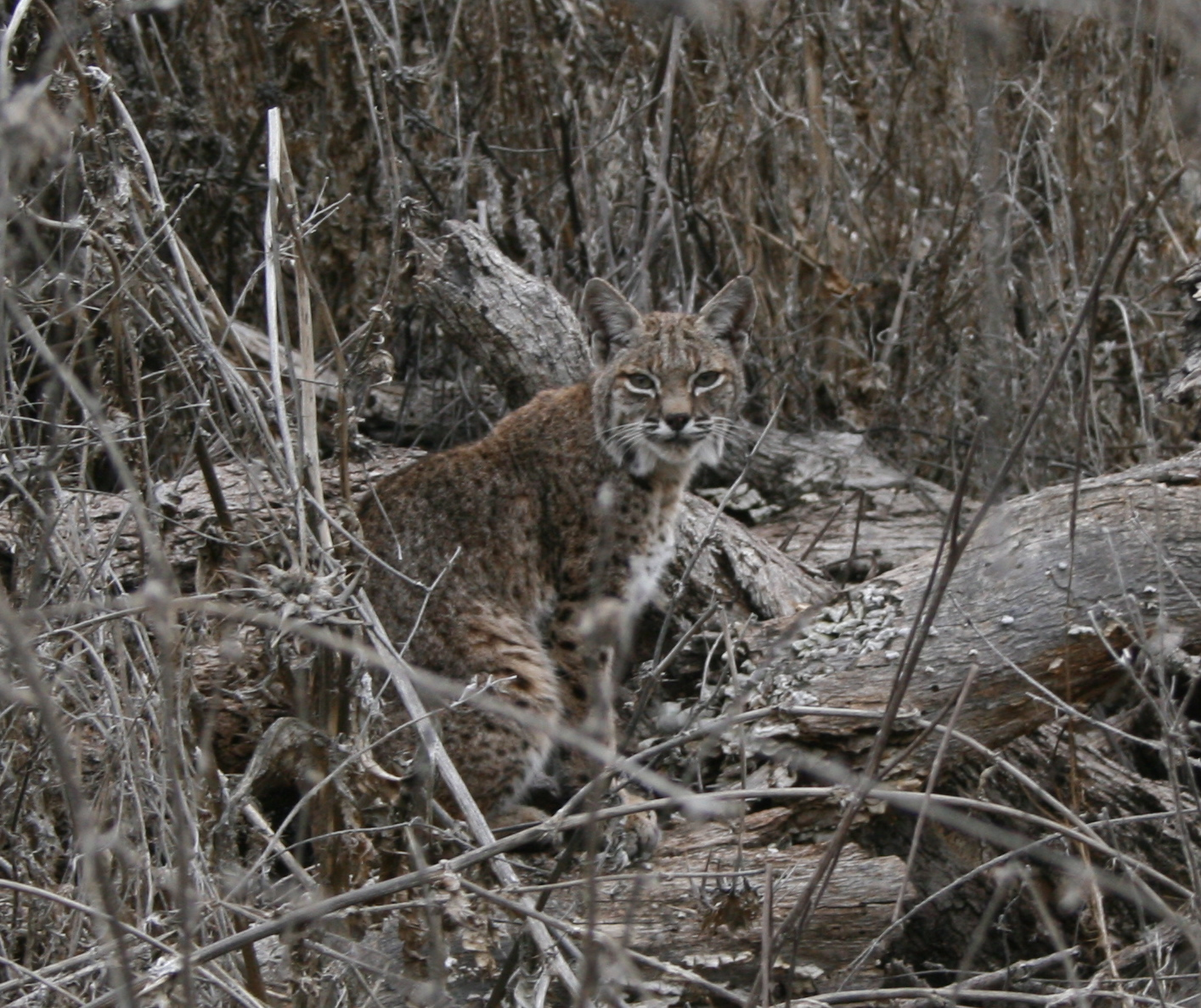
Bobcat in wintertime, at Almaden-Quicksilver Park

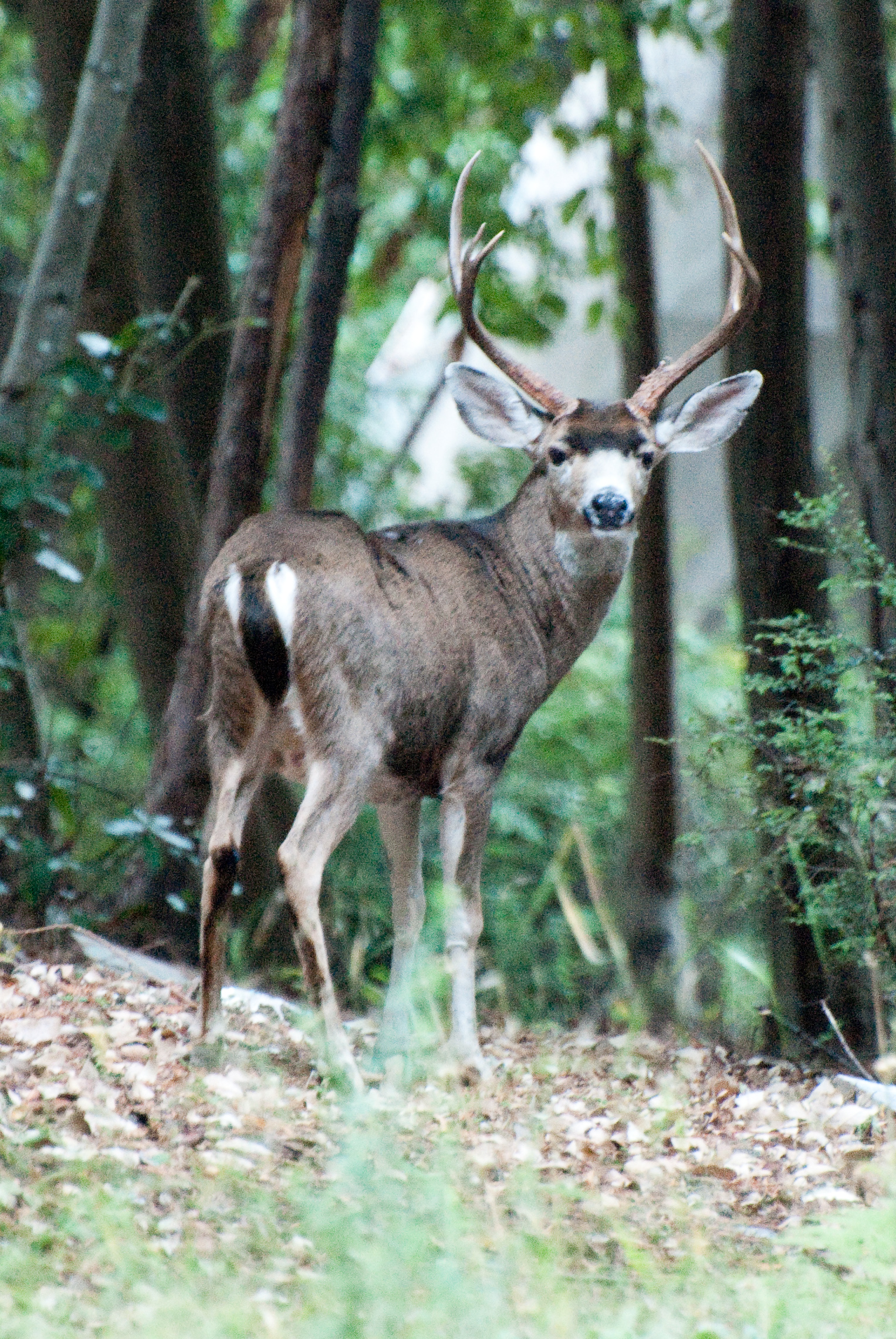
A deer in Ben Lomond

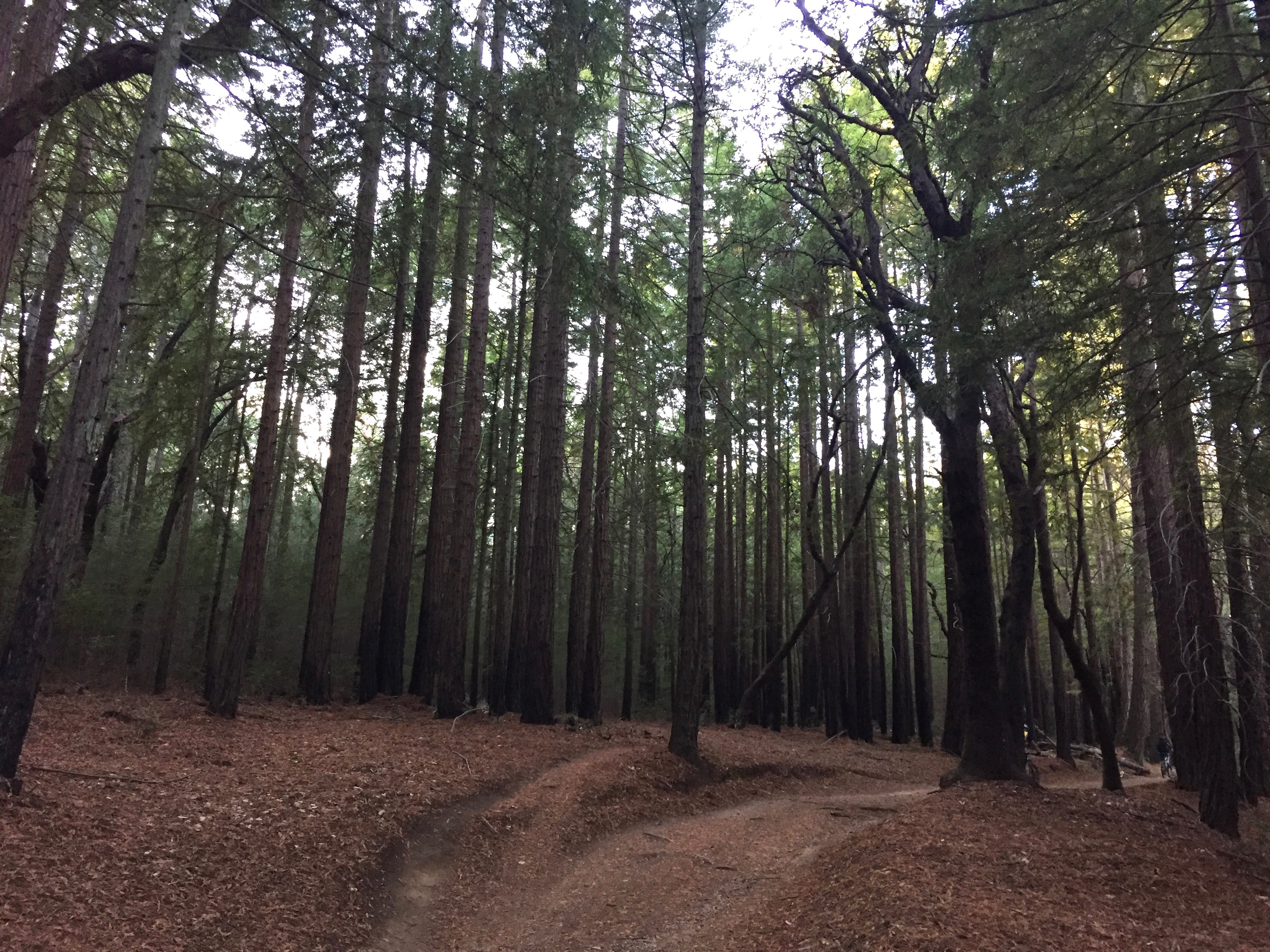
Coastal redwood forests near Santa Cruz

There are two potential critical wildlife linkages which could enable species such as puma (Puma concolor) and tule elk (Cervus canadensis nannodes) to move from and to the Santa Cruz Mountains by connecting to their counterparts in the Diablo Range to the east, as well as in the Gabilan Range to the south. The first is Coyote Valley, which at its northern end, is only 0.4 miles (0.64 km) wide, a narrow gap between the Diablo Range and the Santa Cruz Mountains' Tulare Hill foothill in south San Jose, California. The second critical wildlife passage lies between the southern Santa Cruz Mountains and the northern Gabilan Range, and runs from lands between Mount Pajaro and Rancho Juristac, in southern Santa Cruz and Santa Clara counties respectively, south across California State Route 129 and U.S. Highway 101 to lands between Pinecate Peak and San Juan Bautista in San Benito County. The Land Trust of Santa Cruz County has protected the Santa Cruz Mountains-Gabilan Range Wildlife Corridor with the 2,640 acres (4.13 sq mi) Rocks Ranch in Aromas at the border of San Benito and Monterey counties. Both critical wildlife linkages will require installation of wildlife crossings to enable passage across U.S. Highway 101. The land trust monitored the new wildlife crossing in 2023 for activity at Laurel Curve on Route 17.

== Climate ==
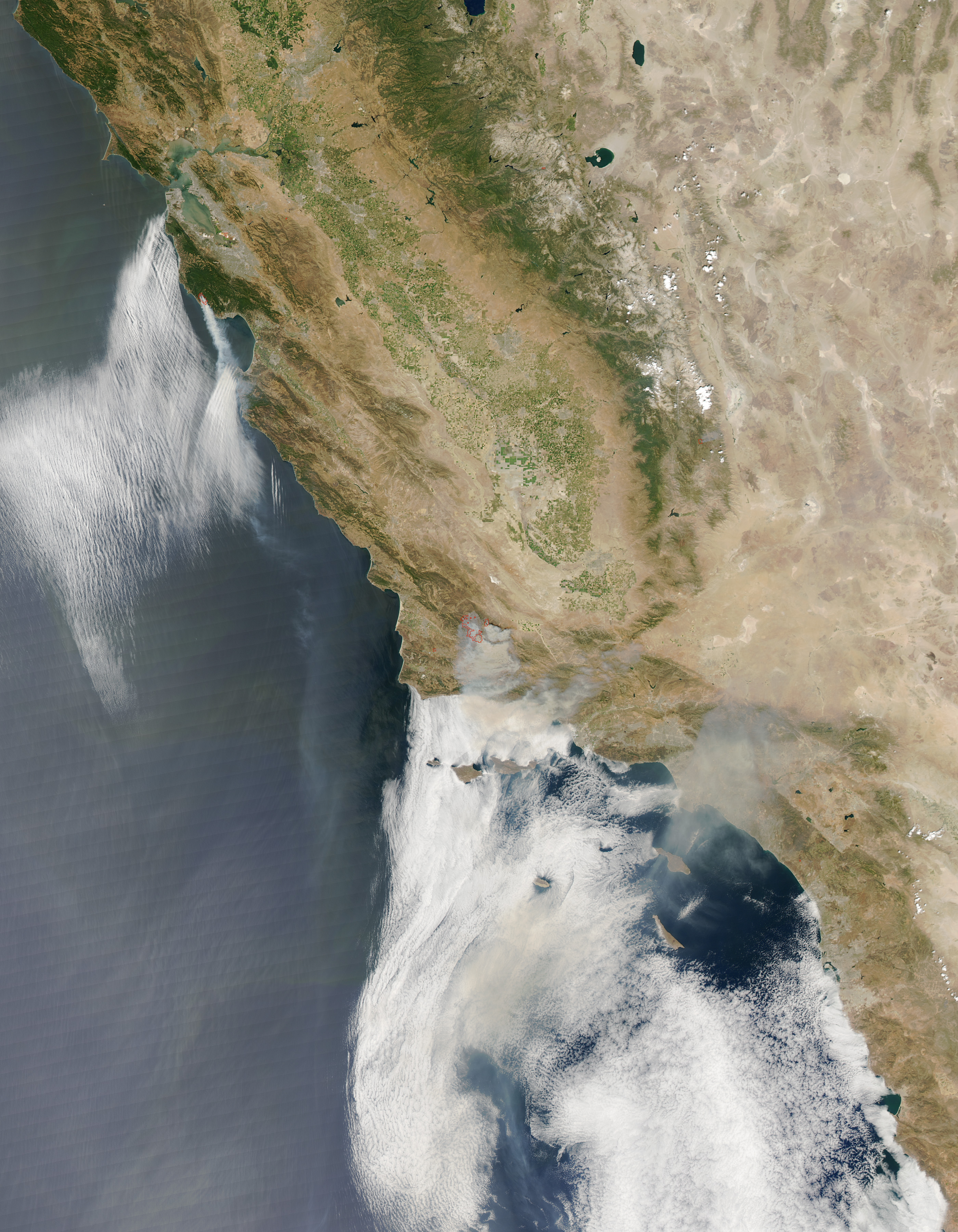
Fine red outlines mark the locations of the Lockheed Fires in the Santa Cruz Mountains.

The Santa Cruz Mountains have a Mediterranean type climate typical of most of California, with the majority of the annual precipitation falling between November and April. According to the National Weather Service, this totals more than 50 inches (127 cm) annually. Heavy summer fogs frequently cover the western ocean-facing slopes and valleys, resulting in drizzle and fog drip caused by condensation on the redwoods, pines, and other trees, which sustains the moisture-loving redwood forests. Due to a rain shadow effect, precipitation on the eastern side of the range is significantly less, about 25 inches (64 cm) a year. Snow falls a few times a year on the highest ridges, and more rarely the higher valleys receive light dustings.

The National Weather Service's cooperative weather stations in the mountains have included Black Mountain 2WSW – average annual rainfall 36.65 inches (931 mm), maximum annual rainfall 80.66 inches (2,049 mm), average annual snowfall 0.7-inch (18 mm), maximum annual snowfall 8.0 inches (200 mm); Los Gatos 5SW – average annual rainfall 26.45 inches (672 mm), maximum annual rainfall 103.23 inches (2,622 mm), average snowfall 2.7 inches (69 mm), maximum annual snowfall 9.0 inches (230 mm); and Wrights – average annual rainfall 46.09 inches (1,171 mm), maximum annual rainfall 87.65 inches (2,226 mm), average annual snowfall 1.2-inch (30 mm), maximum annual snowfall 10.6 inches (270 mm). No temperature records were kept at these stations.

The Santa Cruz Mountains are subject to sharp diurnal temperature fluctuations. The highs and low within a 24-hour period are ~20–30 °F apart on average but can be as much as 50 °F apart during heat waves depending on location. There is also considerable variation in temperature from day to day in both summer and winter with shifting wind directions, and fluctuations in the degree or marine influence.

Average winter highs range from the low 60s °F (~16–18 °C) in the coastal valleys to the upper 50's °F (~14–15 °C) in the valleys further inland. Average Winter overnight lows are a function of topography and can vary significantly, from an average low of 37 °F (3 °C) in the valleys to ~42–44 °F (~6–7 °C) in the thermal belts above the inversion layer where cold air can readily drain off the slopes.

Thermal inversions occur primarily during the Winter when cool air sinks and gets trapped in the valleys at night, often leading to frost and occasional freezes. Higher elevations above the inversion layer usually stay mild with frost being a rare occurrence. The USDA has recently re-classified the hardiness zones for the higher elevations as USDA 10a to 10b to reflect the lack of frost at those locations. However, while the higher elevations are less prone to frost, they are also more likely to experience occasional snow accumulations. The valleys in contrast are rated USDA 9b with some locations as cold as 9a due to the lack of cold air drainage.

Summer temperatures regularly reach highs in the 80s °F (~28–30 °C) with nighttime usually in the upper 40s to lower 60s °F (~9–18 °C) depending on elevation, distance from the ocean and degree of marine inversion present. Summer weather is dominated by a persistent marine layer that can vary in depth. When the inversion layer drops below 300–500 feet, the higher elevations are deprived of marine influence and will often be subject to intense heat waves with daytime temperatures in the 95–105 °F (35–41 °C) range and extreme low humidity with elevated overnight lows that offer little relief from the heat. Such conditions can lead to fires that can occur even before the official State of California fire season starts. Examples of such fires include the 2016 Loma Fire, the 2009 Lockheed Fire and the Summit Fire in 2008.

== Recreation ==
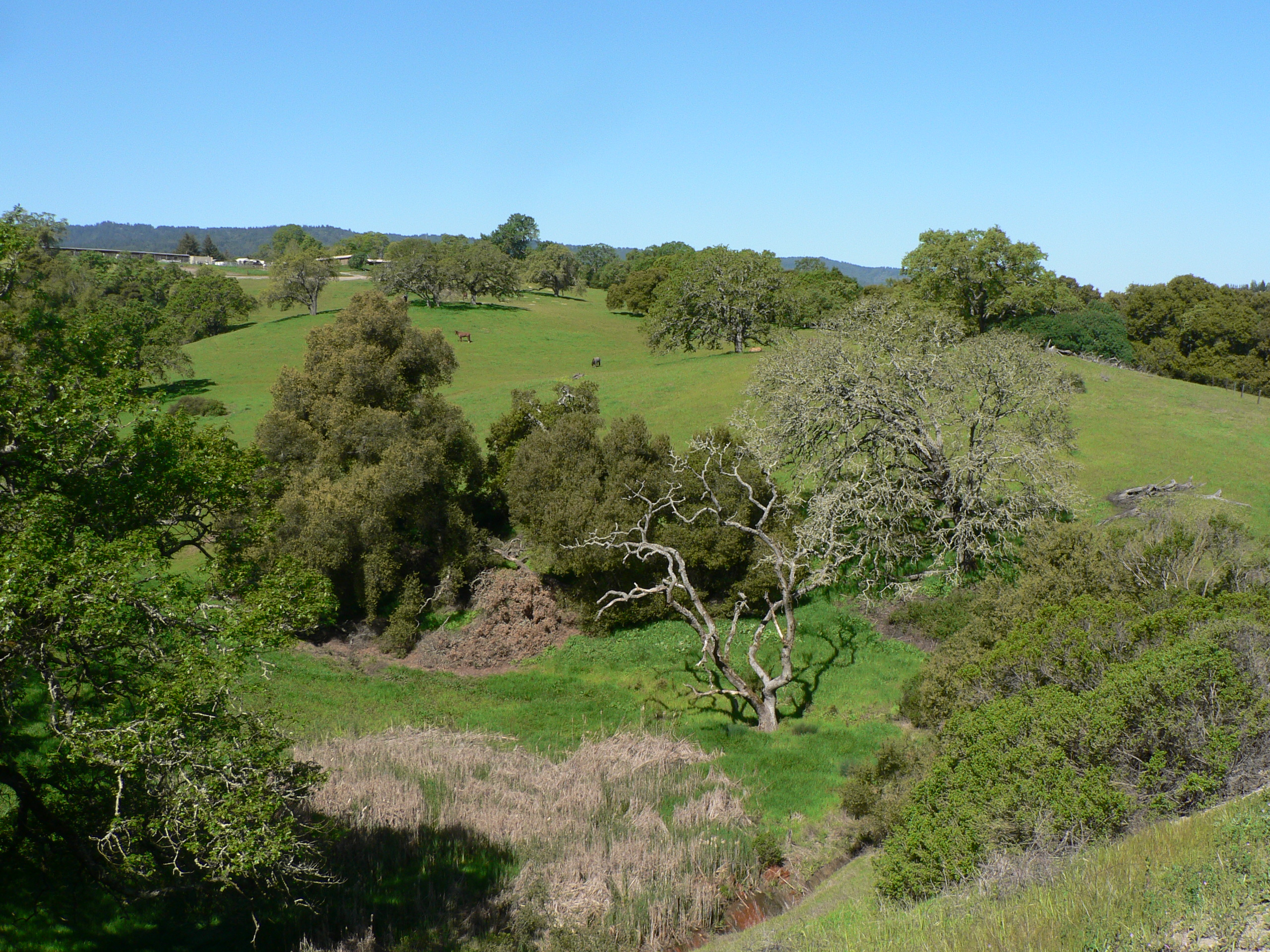
A ranch in the foothills, north of Sand Hill Road, west of Interstate 280

The Santa Cruz Mountains are home to an abundance of parks and protected open spaces, notable among them is California's oldest state park: Big Basin Redwoods State Park. Other state parks include Castle Rock State Park, Portola Redwoods State Park, Butano State Park, The Forest of Nisene Marks State Park, McNee Ranch State Park and Henry Cowell Redwoods State Park with its famous Redwood Grove walking trail. Additional land is protected by the Midpeninsula Regional Open Space District, the Peninsula Open Space Trust (POST), the Sempervirens Fund and local county parks districts, including San Mateo County's 8,000 acre Pescadero Creek County Park. Hiking, horse-riding, mountain biking, rock climbing, and backpacking are popular activities. There is one long-distance trail in the range, the Bay Area Ridge Trail, which, while still disjointed, here roughly parallels Skyline Boulevard along the spine of the range. The Skyline-to-the-Sea Trail, which stretched 38 miles (61 km) from Castle Rock State Park through Big Basin to the Pacific Ocean was also a popular destination for backpackers, until it was closed due to severe damage by the CZU Lightning Complex Fires in 2020. Very few portions of the trail have reopened, and as of 2024, there have not been significant efforts to rebuild the trail. There also exist several backcountry campsites in many of the state parks that enable long distance multi-day outings. Castle Rock State Park has open rock faces suitable for rock climbing and bouldering.

== Cultural history ==
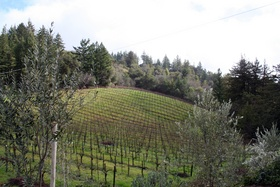
Vineyard in the Santa Cruz Mountains

The previous historic Old Almaden Winery was located on the eastern slopes of the Santa Cruz Mountains. It was the first commercial winery in California, planting high quality European (French) varietal vines.

Film director Alfred Hitchcock and his wife Alma had their primary residence, the Cornwall Ranch, near Scotts Valley, purchased in September 1940.

In 1965, science fiction author Robert A. Heinlein constructed a home in Bonny Doon, and lived there until shortly before his death in 1988.

From 1970 to 2014, singer-songwriter Neil Young lived at Broken Arrow Ranch near Woodside with his family. Many of his songs from this time were recorded at the ranch.
