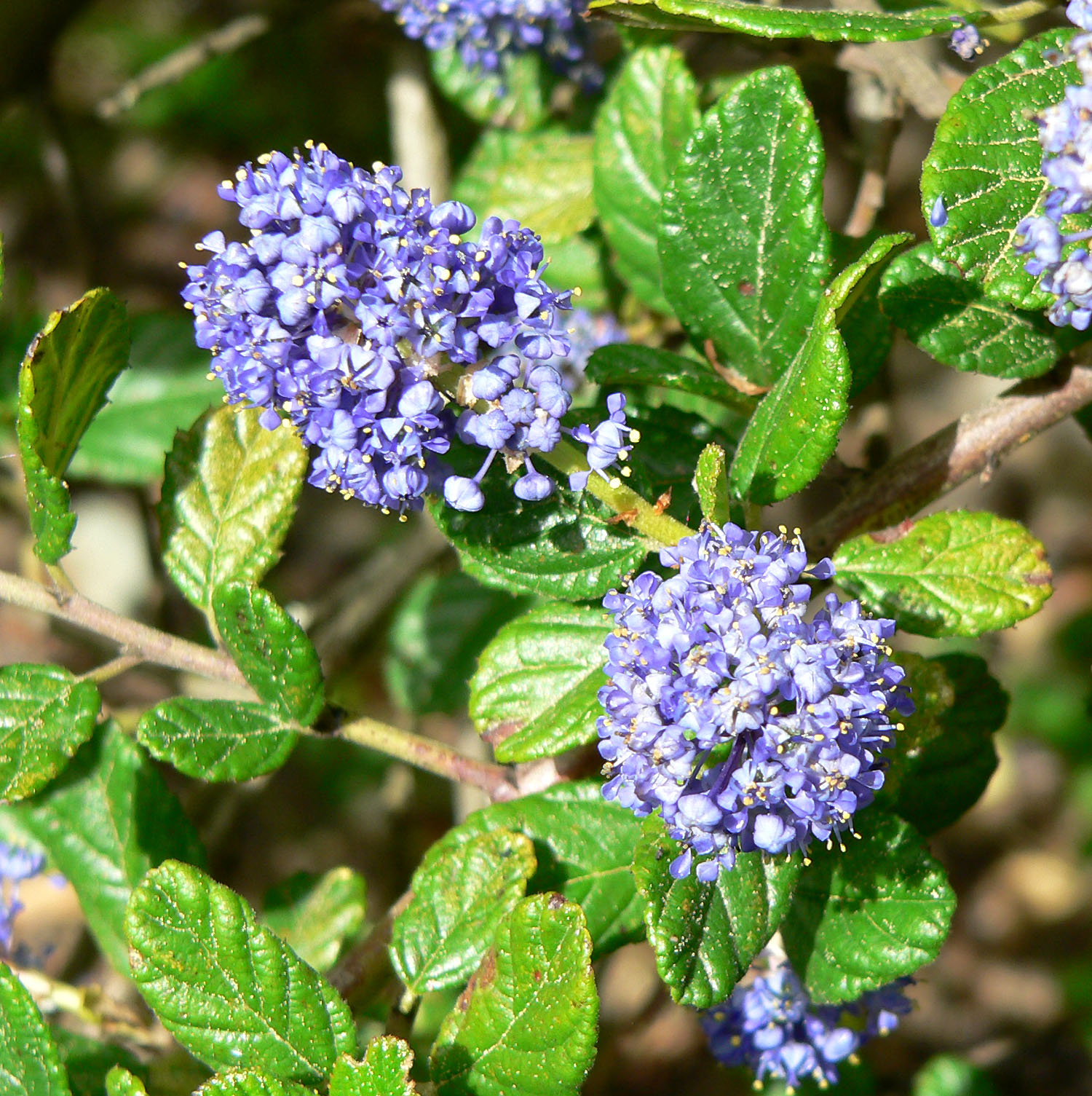
- Ceanothus griseus inflorescences and leaves

Conservation status
- Vulnerable (NatureServe)

Scientific classification
- Kingdom: Plantae
- Clade: Tracheophytes
- Clade: Angiosperms
- Clade: Eudicots
- Clade: Rosids
- Order: Rosales
- Family: Rhamnaceae
- Genus: Ceanothus
- Species: C. griseus

Binomial name
- Ceanothus griseus (Trel. ex B.L.Rob.) McMinn

Varieties
- C. g. var. griseus (autonym); C. g. var. horizontalis _{(Note: horizontalis is not accepted by all botanists)}

Synonyms
- C. thyrsiflorus var. griseus Trel. (basionym)

= Ceanothus griseus =

Species of flowering plant

Ceanothus griseus is a species of flowering shrub known by the common names Carmel ceanothus and Carmel creeper. 'Carmel' refers to the Carmel-by-the-Sea region in California.

== Description ==
The Ceanothus griseus shrub may exceed two meters-6 feet in height when mostly erect, or it can grow wider than tall. The evergreen leaves are ribbed and have slightly serrated edges and fuzzy undersides. The inflorescences are borne on thick stalks a few centimeters long and are dense with small blue or purple flowers. The fruit is a sticky black capsule about 4 millimeters in length containing usually 3 seeds. This is a plant of the chaparral and coastal scrub plant communities.

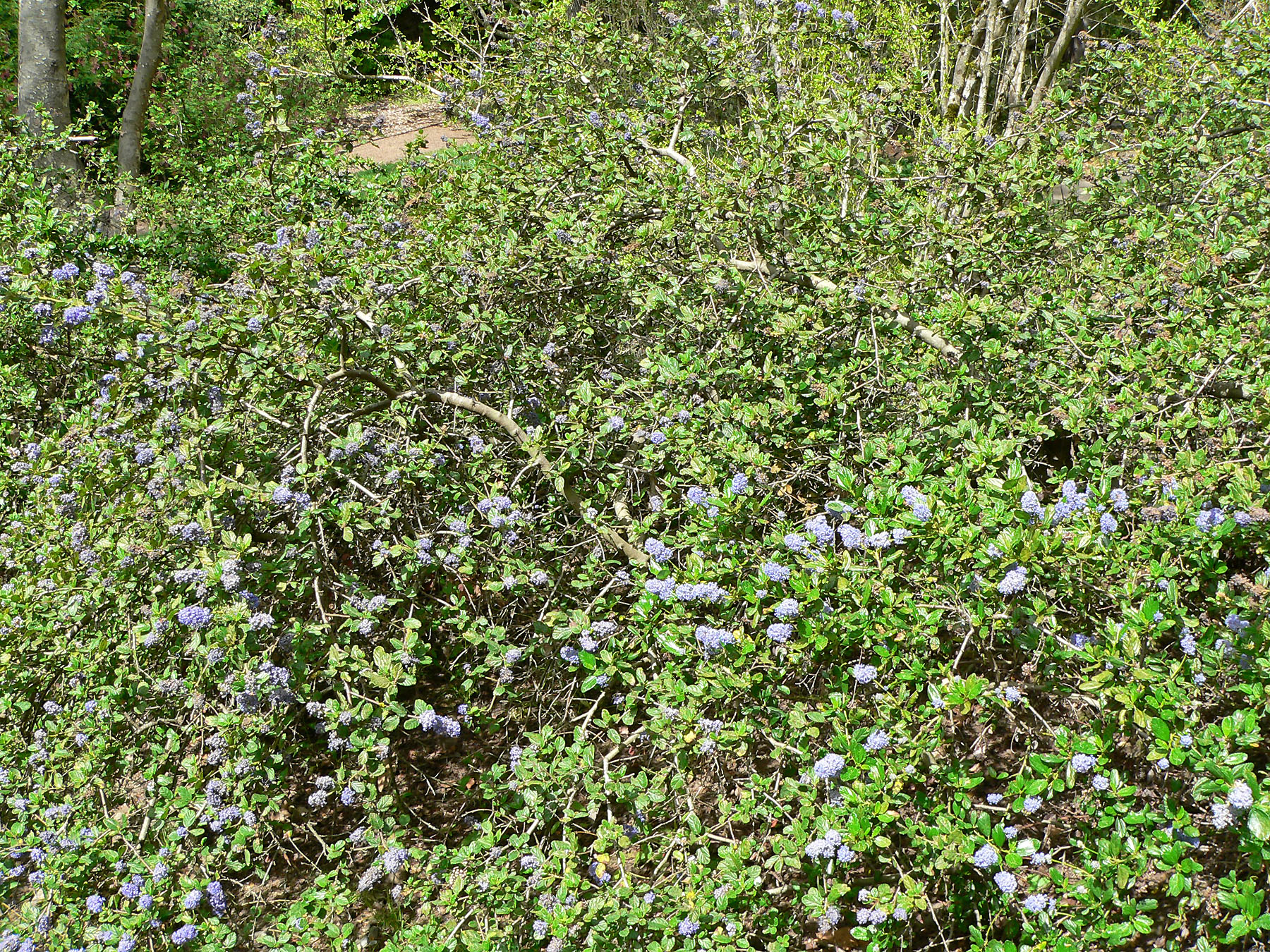
Ceanothus griseus variation griseus

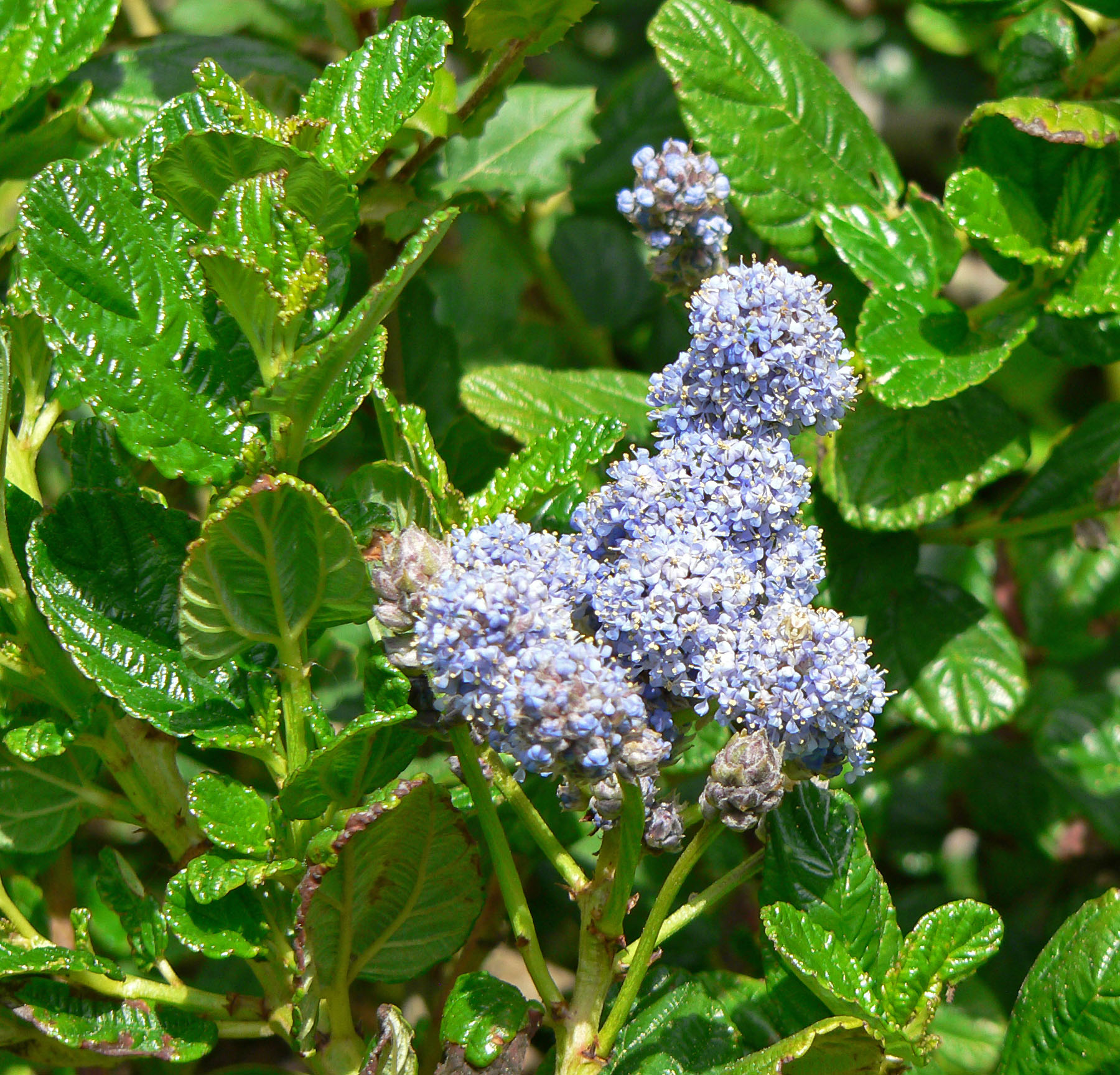
Ceanothus griseus variation horizontalis

== Distribution ==
This Ceanothus is endemic to California, where its distribution extends throughout the Coast Ranges in the northern two thirds of the state.

== Cultivation ==
The species and cultivars are widely available in the horticulture trade for conventional and native plant habitat gardens.
