= Keyston Creek =

River in California, United States

Coordinates: 37.26161°N 122.250246°W

Keyston Creek is a small river in San Mateo County, California and is a tributary of Pescadero Creek.

== See also ==
- List of watercourses in the San Francisco Bay Area
