= Pescadero Creek =

Pescadero Creek Arroyo del Pescadero, Pescador River
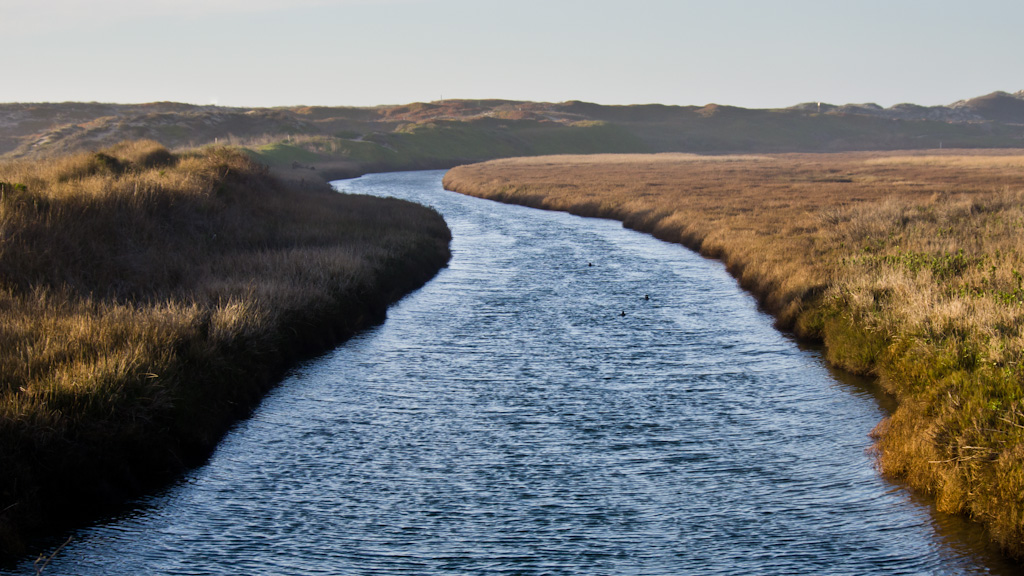

Location
- Country: United States
- State: California
- Region: San Mateo County and Santa Cruz counties
- City: Pescadero

Physical characteristics
- Source
  - location: Western edge of Castle Rock State Park
  - coordinates: 37°14′25″N 122°09′12″W
  - elevation: 1,880 ft (570 m)
- Mouth: Pacific Ocean
  - location: 14.4 miles (23 km) south of Half Moon Bay, California
  - coordinates: 37°15′50″N 122°24′26″W
  - elevation: 10 ft (3.0 m)
- Basin size: 170 mi^{2} (440 km^{2})

Basin features
- Tributaries
  - left: Butano Creek
  - right: Peters Creek

Pescadero Creek is a major stream in Santa Cruz and San Mateo counties in California, United States. At 26.6 miles (42.8 km), it is the longest stream in San Mateo County and flows all year from springs in the Santa Cruz Mountains. Its source is at 1,880 feet (570 m) above sea level on the western edge of Castle Rock State Park, with additional headwaters in Portola Redwoods State Park, and its course traverses Pescadero Creek County Park and San Mateo County Memorial Park before entering Pescadero Marsh Natural Preserve at Pescadero State Beach and thence to the Pacific Ocean 14.4 miles (23 km) south of Half Moon Bay.

== History ==
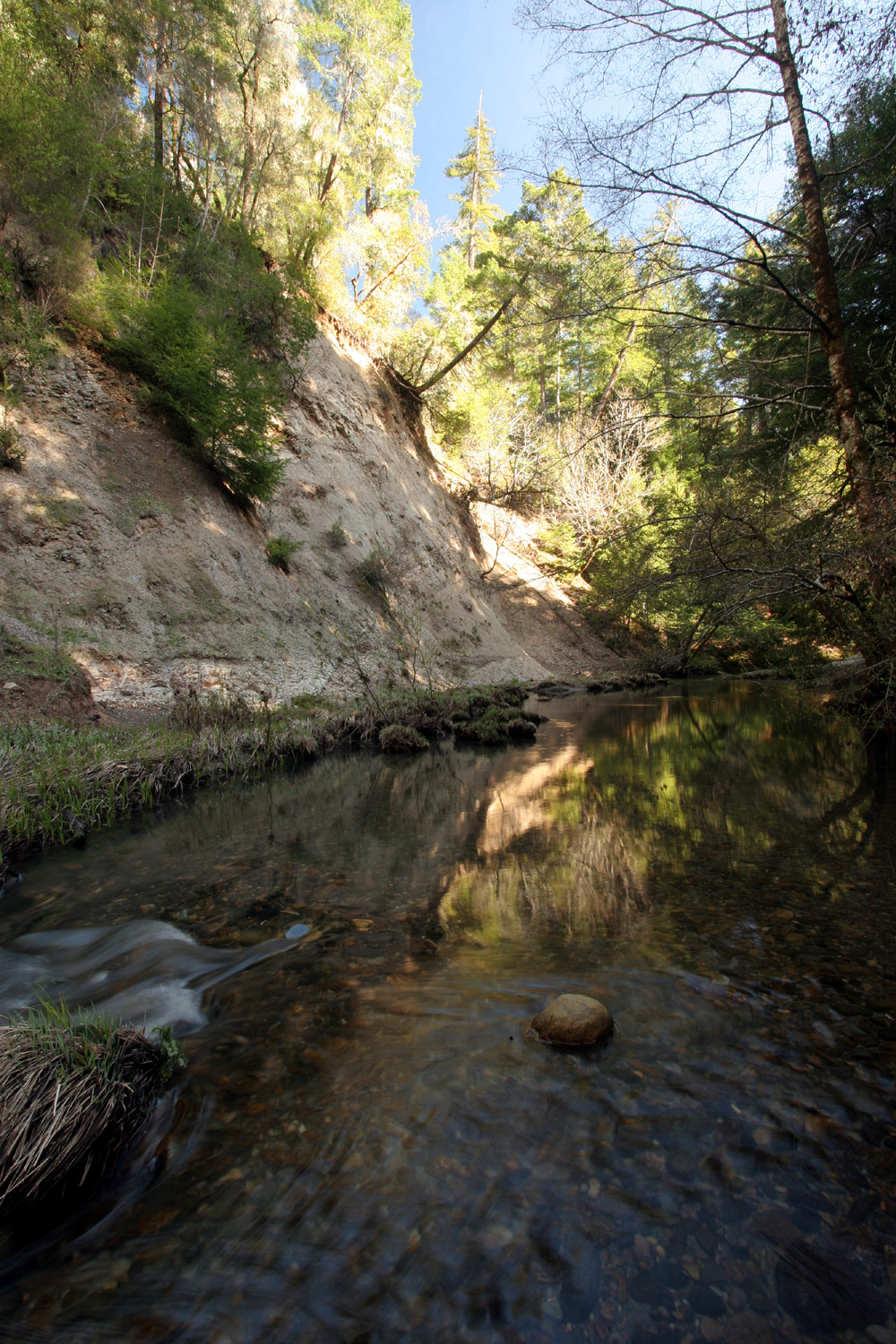
Pescadero Creek

Pescadero is Spanish for "fishing place". In early Mexican land grants or disueños, John Gilroy stated "The Castros, I and an Indian gave it that name in 1814, being a place where we used to catch salmon." Arroyo del Pescadero appears on the disueños of the 1830s. The 1860s' Coast Survey called it the Pescador River. Spanish-speaking people founded the town of Pescadero, California in 1856.

The pre-European Pescadero watershed was occupied by the Ohlone. The Quirostes controlled the area from Bean Hollow Creek southward to Año Nuevo Creek and inland to Butano Ridge. The Oljon controlled from the lower San Gregorio Creek drainage southward to Bean Hollow Creek, including the lower Pescadero and Butano drainages. The Cotogen held the land in and around Purisima Creek. When the Portolà Expedition traveled on horseback along the immediate coast on October 24, 1769, Padre Juan Crespí wrote, "Only in the watercourses are any trees to be seen; elsewhere we saw nothing but grass, and that was burned." The Ohlone managed the land with the most effective tool they had, fire.

The Santa Cruz Lumber Company built a sawmill near Waterman Gap in 1923. The company formed a log pond by building a wooden dam in the creek, and the sawmill was built over the creek downstream of the log pond. The sawmill employed fifty to eighty men manufacturing sixty-thousand board foot of redwood and Douglas fir lumber daily. A forest railway was extended more than 7 miles (11 km) up Pescadero Creek to bring logs down to the sawmill after loggers had felled all trees close enough to be winched to the mill with cables. Railway operations began when the company purchased a 2-truck Shay locomotive (Lima Locomotive Works number 2461) from the San Joaquin and Eastern Railroad in 1930 and continued until the railroad grade was converted to a truck road in 1950. The sawmill ceased operations in 1972.

Farmers began building levees and drained small areas of the marsh by the late 1920s. Substantial levee building and conversion of marshlands to agriculture occurred during the 1930s, and continued through the early 1960s. The State began acquiring land in the 1960s. In the early 1960s local farmers used a dragline to remove sediment from Butano Creek channel below Pescadero Bridge for several thousand feet down stream. The sediment removed was used to build a 6,000 foot levee on the west side of Butano Creek. Other levees were built to keep salt water out of agricultural fields. California Department of Fish and Game (DFG) required the dragline practice to stop following the introduction of new fish protection laws in 1963.

The Highway One bridge was rebuilt (1989–90) with fewer supports and closer to the ocean to minimize effects on the stream and lagoon; the original bridge had been built in the early 1940s.

== Ecology ==
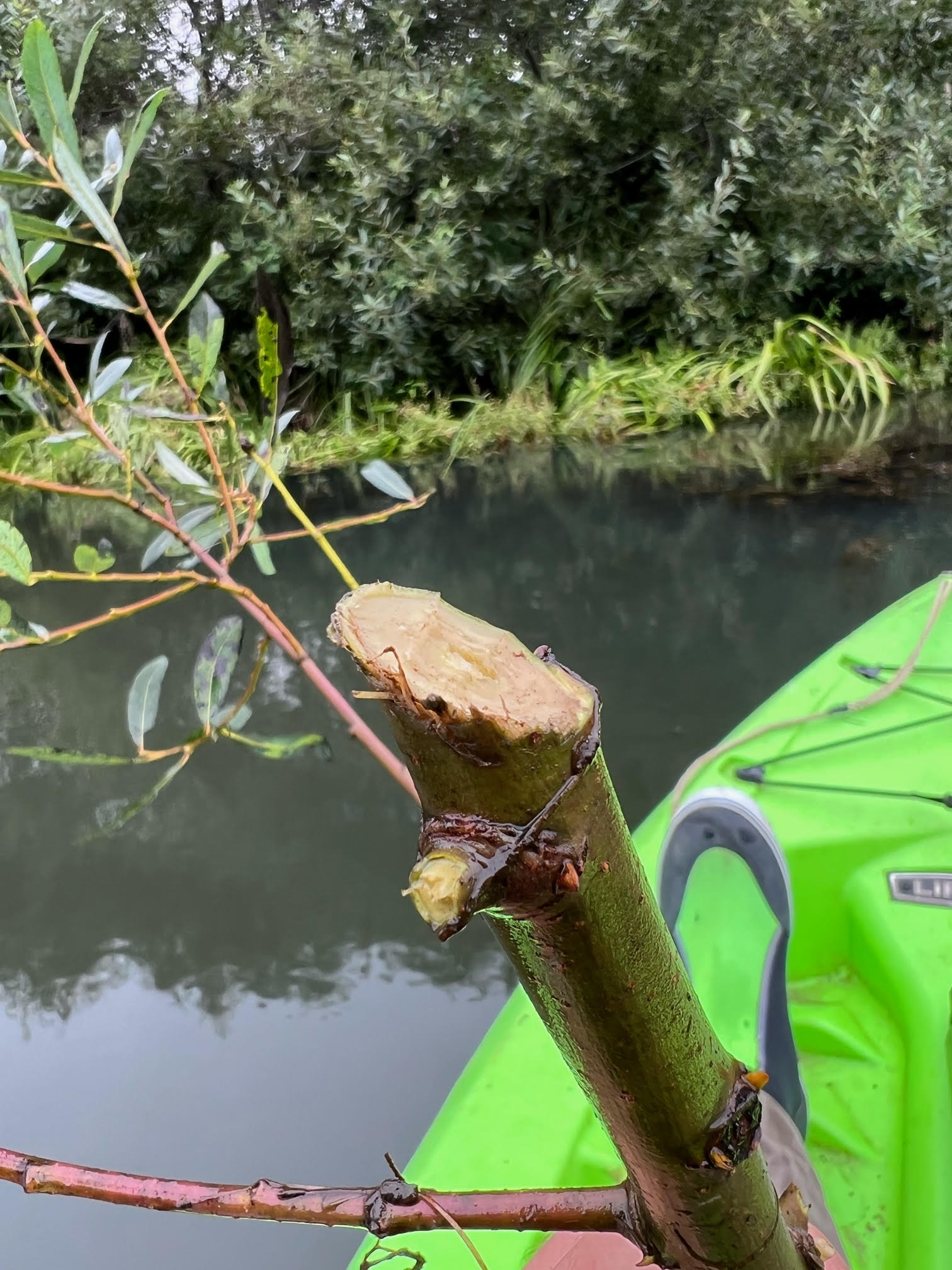
Beaver-chewed willow branch in newly restored channel of Butano Creek. Photo taken September 25, 2022, courtesy of Troy Guy.

Intensive logging and watershed development, also beginning in the late 1920s or early 1930s, has dramatically increased sedimentation in Butano and Pescadero creeks. Both streams are listed under the federal Clean Water Act as impaired water bodies for sediment. Concerns about agricultural pesticide runoff into the marsh prompted a report prepared by DFG. Jong confirmed eutrophic (high nutrient) conditions in the marsh and found that algae blooms raise dissolve oxygen (DO) levels to saturation during the day and deplete levels during night respiration. Jong speculated that the low night DO could result in fish kills. The DFG study found levels of pesticides potentially toxic to fish in the sediment. In the mid-1980s the west bank levee of Butano Creek was breached about 50 feet downstream of Pescadero Road Bridge in order to reduce flood flows down the Butano Creek channel in the marsh. Breaches in other levees of the North Butano Marsh were also made to improve circulation.

Historically, both Pescadero Creek and Butano Creek, as well as several tributary streams, supported runs of steelhead trout (Oncorhynchus mykiss) and coho salmon (Oncorhynchus kisutch). Steelhead are still present, but there have been only sparse reports of coho in the watershed in recent years. Before logging removed much of the dense forest cover of this area in the middle of the 20th century, these streams were shaded, with frequent, stable pools created by fallen trees, bedrock outcrops, and boulders, and an abundant, if not steady, supply of gravel. With cool stream temperatures and reliable flows through the summer, they provided excellent habitat for salmon and trout, and both Pescadero Creek and Butano Creek were renowned sports fishing streams for vacationing San Franciscans in the late 19th century. According to a study by Professor Jerry Smith of San Jose State University, estimates in 1985 showed that 10,000 steelhead trout were rearing in the lagoon. As of 2008, 750 steelhead were counted in the same area. With the exception of a few juvenile coho observed in Peters Creek in 1999, salmon have been absent from the watershed until a 2003 release of 17,000 hatchery-raised coho smolts in Pescadero Creek. Very few of these coho have returned to the creek. In spring 2015, biologists discovered three coho salmon (with tags from the nearby Scott Creek hatchery) spawning in Pescadero Creek.

California Golden Beaver (Castor canadensis subauratus) were re-introduced to Pescadero Creek around 1937–1938 by the DFG after near extinction in California in the early twentieth century. The beavers continue to thrive and although concerns about flooding related to beaver dams occurs, there is evidence that beaver in the lower channel in the 1950s reduced sediment movement through the system, especially since the late 1980s. Beaver improve salmonid abundance and size as their beaver ponds recharge the water table which, in turn, replenishes stream flows in the dry season and by providing ideal over-summering habitat. Contrary to popular myth, most beaver dams do not pose barriers to trout and salmon migration, although they may be restricted seasonally during periods of low stream flows. An extensive review recently proved that beaver were historically native to all of California except the most arid deserts, including coastal California. Beaver sign (Castor canadensis) was recently documented in the newly restored Butano Creek channel just above the Pescadero lagoon in September, 2022 (See photo).

=== Pescadero Marsh ===
Located at the confluence of Pescadero and Butano Creeks, the area known as Pescadero Marsh has for decades been a thriving habitat for both migratory and native wildlife. Besides being a refuge and nesting ground for wintering waterfowl, the marsh is a critical spawning area and nursery for coho salmon, steelhead trout, tidewater goby, and many other threatened or endangered fish, amphibian, and reptile species. Since 1995, annual fish "die-offs" of hundreds of juvenile fish, crabs, and other species occur in the late fall when the sandbar barrier between the lagoon and the ocean is breached. As water levels fluctuate, many species are cut off from supportive habitat, and the entire eco-system degrades. Since 1998 concerned citizens and other wildlife agencies have repeatedly asked California State Parks to take immediate corrective action. The Parks Department has failed to respond, and has instead moved to request further studies. Meanwhile, native species populations in the marsh have reached critically low levels.

The Pescadero Lagoon Science Panel was established in 2013 to provide independent scientific expertise in support of management decisions and possible restoration actions for Pescadero marsh and lagoon.

==== Steelhead restoration ====
A federal project to revive the steelhead trout population showed success in 2012, and may be continued in 2013.

== Watershed ==
The Pescadero-Butano watershed is the largest coastal watershed between the Golden Gate and the San Lorenzo River. The watershed's two principal streams, Pescadero Creek and Butano Creek, which have their confluence in Pescadero Marsh, drain 81 square miles (210 km^{2}) of the Santa Cruz Mountains. Peters Creek in Portola Redwoods State Park, Oil Creek, Slate Creek and Butano Creek are the largest of many tributaries of Pescadero Creek.

== Tributaries ==
- Butano Creek
- Bradley Creek
  - Chandler Gulch
- Honsinger Creek
  - Windmill Gulch
  - Big Chicken Hollow
  - Little Chicken Hollow
- Newell Gulch
- Roy Gulch
- Blomquist Creek
- Peterson Creek
- Hoffman Creek
- McCormick Creek
- Harwood Creek
- Dark Gulch
- Keyston Creek
- Carriger Creek
- Rhododendron Creek
- Tarwater Creek
- Peters Creek
  - Evans Creek
  - Bear Creek
  - Lambert Creek
- Fall Creek
- Iverson Creek
- Slate Creek
- Oil Creek
- Little Boulder Creek
- Waterman Creek

== See also ==
- List of watercourses in the San Francisco Bay Area
