= Rhododendron Creek =

Stream in California, United States

Coordinates: 37.258832°N 122.239967°W

Rhododendron Creek is a small river in San Mateo County, California and is a tributary of Pescadero Creek.

== See also ==
- List of watercourses in the San Francisco Bay Area
