= Carriger Creek (San Mateo County, California) =

Stream in San Mateo County, California, US

Coordinates: 37.263832°N 122.255524°W

Carriger Creek is a small river in San Mateo County, California, and is a tributary of Pescadero Creek.

== See also ==
- List of watercourses in the San Francisco Bay Area
