= Harwood Creek =

River in California, United States

Coordinates: 37.26661°N 122.263302°W

Harwood Creek is a small river in San Mateo County, California. It is a tributary of Pescadero Creek.

== See also ==
- List of watercourses in the San Francisco Bay Area
