= Peterson Creek (San Mateo County, California) =

Stream in San Mateo County, California, U.S.

Coordinates: 37.273277°N 122.29247°W

Peterson Creek is a stream in San Mateo County, California and is a tributary of Pescadero Creek.

== See also ==
- List of watercourses in the San Francisco Bay Area
