= Dark Gulch =

Valley in San Mateo County, California, United States

Coordinates: 37.265776°N 122.258579°W

Dark Gulch is a valley in San Mateo County, California associated with a small stream that is a tributary of Pescadero Creek.

== See also ==
- List of watercourses in the San Francisco Bay Area
