= Little Chicken Hollow =

Valley in California, United States

Coordinates: 37.281610°N 122.344972°W

Little Chicken Hollow is a valley in San Mateo County, California. It contains a stream which is a fork of Honsinger Creek.

== See also ==
- Big Chicken Hollow
- List of watercourses in the San Francisco Bay Area
