= Hoffman Creek =

Stream in San Mateo County, California, U.S.

Coordinates: 37.2743875°N 122.2841359°W

Hoffman Creek is a stream in San Mateo County, California and is a tributary of Pescadero Creek.

== See also ==
- List of watercourses in the San Francisco Bay Area
