= Tarwater Creek =

Small river in San Mateo County, California

Coordinates: 37.2613°N 122.2414°W

Tarwater Creek is a small river in San Mateo County, California, and is a tributary of Pescadero Creek.

Pescadero Creek Park sits atop a deposit of natural gas and oil. Natural gas occasionally bubbles up through seams near Hoffman Creek producing a strong gas odor. Crude oil pools up in the channel of Tarwater Creek, and seeps into Jones Gulch Creek staining the rocks. Oil exploration was attempted in the 1970s but failed to hit the pool.

There was also some limited historical oil production in the 1880s on the coast to the west.

== See also ==
- List of watercourses in the San Francisco Bay Area
