= Peninsula Open Space Trust =

US conservation nonprofit organisation

- Abbreviation: POST
- Formation: 1977; 49 years ago
- Type: 501(c)(3) nonprofit organization
- Legal status: Charitable organization
- Purpose: Nature conservation
- Headquarters: Palo Alto, California
- Region served: California - Peninsula and South Bay
- Methods: Land acquisition; ecological restoration
- Fields: Land conservation, ecological restoration
- President: Gordon Clark
- Staff: 64 (2023)
- Volunteers: 353 (2023)
- Website: openspacetrust.org

The Peninsula Open Space Trust (POST) is a nonprofit land trust headquartered in Palo Alto, California.

== Mission and Work ==
POST's mission is to protect open space on the Peninsula and in the South Bay for the benefit of all. The organization has been involved in land acquisitions in the Santa Cruz Mountains, Half Moon Bay, Coyote Valley in Santa Clara County, and farmland conservation in San Mateo County.

== History ==
POST was created in 1977 as a private 501(c)(3) non-profit organization able to negotiate private land sales and protective easements with willing sellers in confidence. They were created five years after the formation of the Midpeninsula Regional Open Space District to protect land for open space.
