= Butano State Park =

State park in California, United States

Butano Creek State Park
- IUCN category III (natural monument or feature)
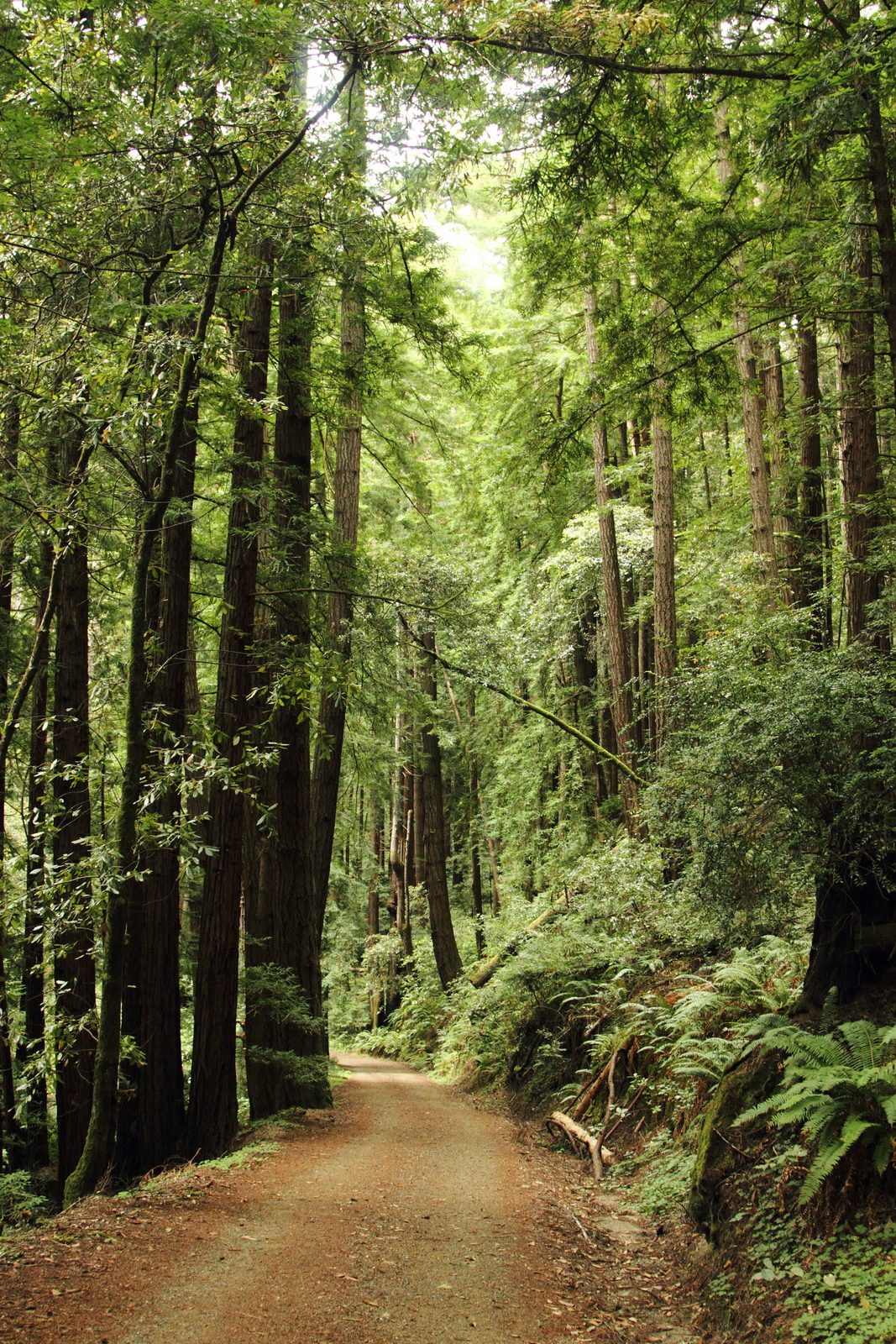
- Olmo Fire Road in Butano State Park

- Location within California Location within the United States
- Location: San Mateo County, California, United States
- Nearest city: Pescadero, California
- Coordinates: 37°12′48″N 122°18′35″W
- Area: 4,728 acres (19.13 km^{2})
- Established: 1956
- Governing body: California Department of Parks and Recreation

Butano State Park is a state park in the U.S. state of California, showcasing the secluded redwood-filled canyon of Little Butano Creek, a tributary of Butano Creek in the Pescadero Creek watershed. Located in San Mateo County near Pescadero, the 4,728-acre (1,913 ha) park was established in 1956.

== Features ==
The park features 40 miles of hiking trails, 21 drive-in campsites and 18 walk-in campsites. Restrooms with running water are provided. Drinking water is available at the park in both the campground and in the day use areas. There are no showers. Butano also has a backpacking site along a trail 5.5 miles (8.9 km) up from the entrance. There is no water at the site but there is water nearby from seasonal streams.

Guided nature walk and weekend campfire programs are offered during the summer.

== Name ==
Butano as a name has been applied to land grants, creeks, falls, ridges and forests. The earliest mention is by Padre Jaime Escudet in 1816. A butano is what early Californians called a drinking cup made from horn of a bull or other animal. A Native American origin is possible. It has been suggested that the word might mean "meeting place".

== See also ==
- List of California state parks
