= Skyline Ridge Open Space Preserve =

Coordinates: 37.3123°N 122.1771°W

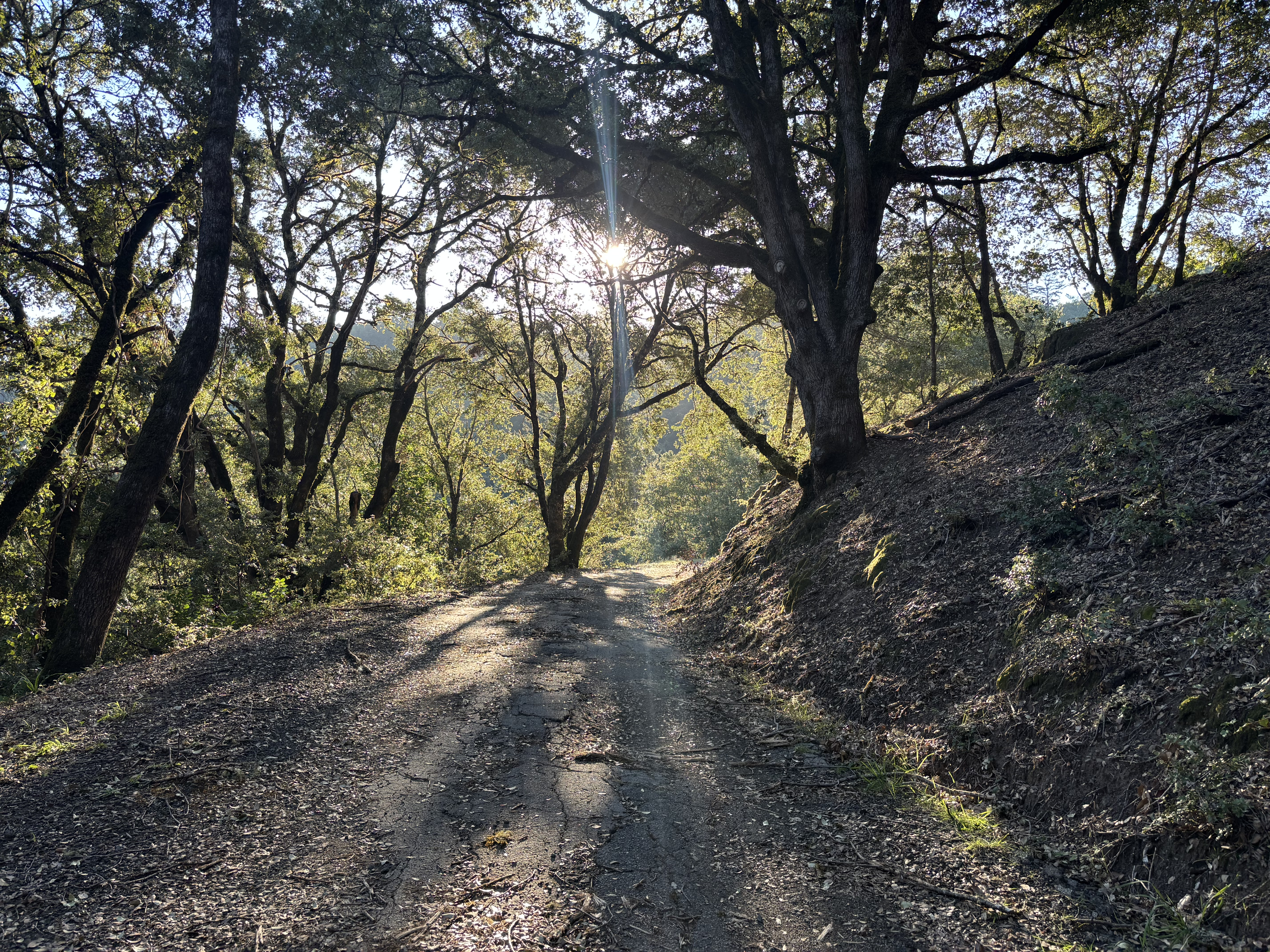
Old Page Mill Trail in Skyline Ridge Open Space

Skyline Ridge Open Space Preserve is a 2,143-acre (867 ha) open space preserve in the Santa Cruz Mountains of California. The preserve features a nature center built with funding from the Peninsula Open Space Trust, two reservoirs, and 12 miles of trails, with some trails allowing access for equestrians and cyclists.

A section of the Bay Area Ridge Trail passes through the preserve.

== History ==
Some of the land that is now the preserve was previously owned by James Rolph, who served as mayor of San Francisco and later as the Governor of California.
