= Portola Redwoods State Park =

State park in Northern California

- IUCN category III (natural monument or feature)
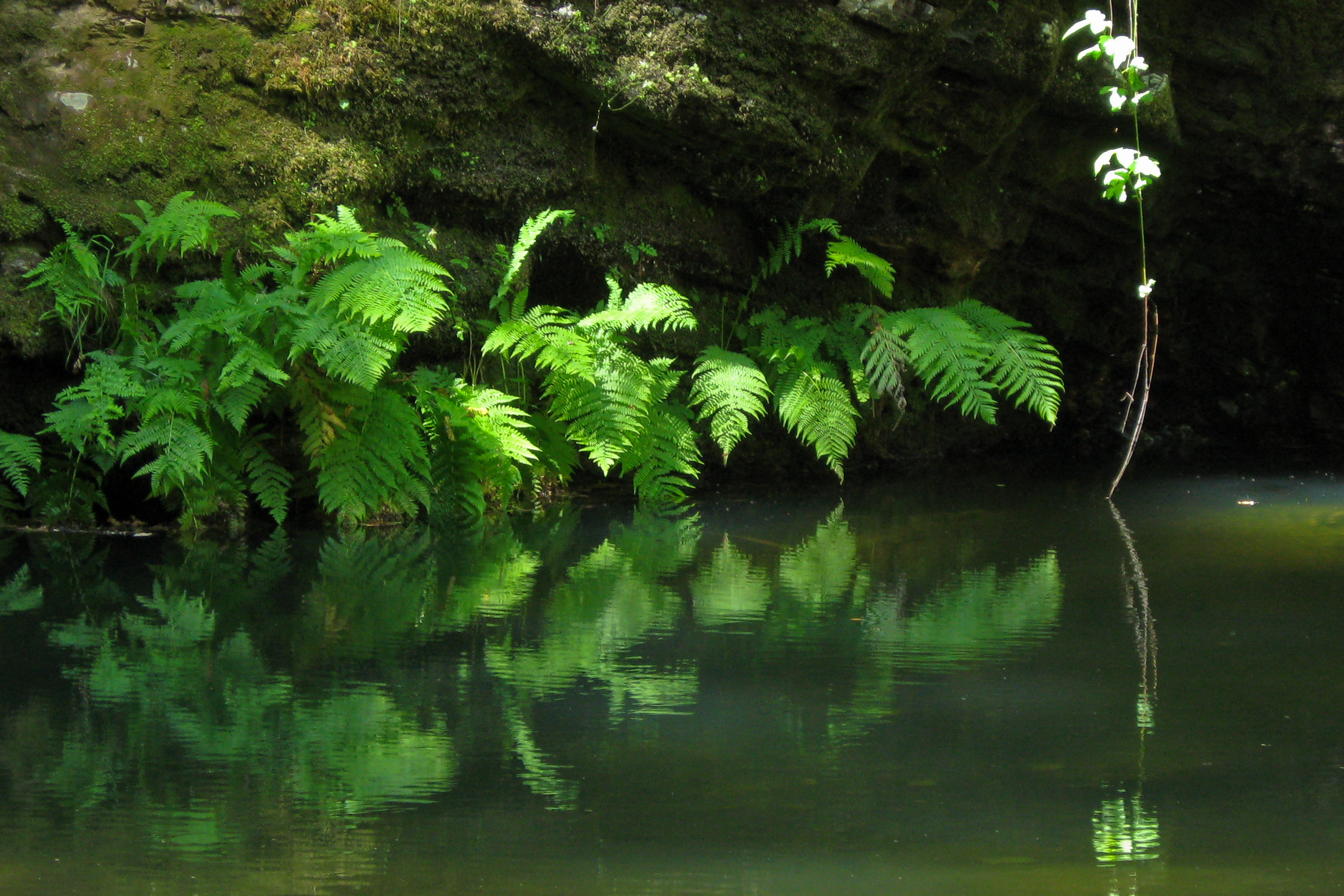
- Ferns in Portola Redwoods State Park
- Interactive map of Portola Redwoods State Park
- Location: San Mateo County, California, United States
- Nearest city: La Honda, California, United States
- Coordinates: 37°15′35″N 122°12′00″W
- Area: 2,800 acres (11 km^{2})
- Established: 1945
- Governing body: California Department of Parks and Recreation

Portola Redwoods State Park is a 2,800 acres (1,100 ha) state park in California situated in San Mateo County. The parks' primary watercourses — Peters Creek, Pescadero Creek and their associated tributaries — converge at Portola Redwoods State Park. Tip Toe Falls is a small waterfall along Fall Creek, a tributary of Pescadero Creek.

The indigenous Quiroste people, affiliated with the broader constellation of Ramaytush Ohlone communities based in the San Francisco Peninsula, were among the original inhabitants of Portola Redwoods State Park, where they obtained various species of fish, such as coho salmon and steelhead trout, along the waterways that wend along the region, and harvested asphaltum from Tar Creek. In addition, the Quiroste maintained trading networks with tribes further inland and exchanged a variety of coastal products, including beads cultivated from Olivella sea shells as a means of barter.

In 1769, the Portola expedition entailed an overland journey from the Pacific coastline of San Mateo County to San Francisco Bay, presaging the advent of European-American settlement and colonization in the area. During the nineteenth-century California Gold Rush, the copious redwood groves were harvested for industrial purposes, such as mining and other construction enterprises. It was not until the 1860s, however, that the park was settled by Danish immigrant and lumberjack Christian Iverson, whose surname is commemorated by the titular Iverson trail today.

By 1924, about 1,600 acres (650 ha) — about half of the park's contemporary size — was bequeathed to the Masonic Lodge, whose Shriners subsequently sold the land to the State of California, and Portola Redwoods State Park officially opened under the auspices of the California Department of Parks and Recreation in 1945. Owing to the fundraising efforts of such environmental organizations as Save the Redwoods League, the park was later enlarged to its current dimensions.

Relatively remote and secluded, the park offers various recreational opportunities for visitors, including a variety of hiking trails ranging in length and difficulty. For instance, the 1.2 miles (1.9 km) roundtrip Old Tree Trail confers access to the eponymous redwood tree, renowned for its longevity (estimated at 1200 years) and height of over 300 feet (91 m). In addition, the longer Peters Creek Loop offers backpackers and hikers willing to traverse 11.9 miles (19.2 km) roundtrip the opportunity to witness some of the oldest and tallest redwoods in the San Francisco Bay Area.

Portola Redwoods State Park contains approximately 18 miles of hiking trails in the 2,800-acre park, a small car-camping campground of about 50 campsites, four group campsites, and 6 trail sites at Slate Creek Trail Camp. Portola Redwoods State Park is also home to the site of Page shingle Mill, for which Page Mill Road is named.

== Name ==
The name of the state park was suggested by Aubrey Drury at a Park Commission meeting and was adopted on motion of Commissioner Leo Carrillo, a descendant of members of the Portolá expedition.
