= List of watercourses in the San Francisco Bay Area =

These watercourses (rivers, creeks, sloughs, etc.) in the San Francisco Bay Area are grouped according to the bodies of water they flow into. Tributaries are listed under the watercourses they feed, sorted by the elevation of the confluence so that tributaries entering nearest the sea appear first. Numbers in parentheses are Geographic Names Information System feature identifiers.

== Pacific Coast north of the Golden Gate ==
=== Sonoma Coast ===
Watercourses which feed into the Pacific Ocean in Sonoma County north of Bodega Head, listed from north to south:

==== The Gualala River and its tributaries ====
- Gualala River (253221)
  - North Fork (229679) – flows from Mendocino County.
  - South Fork (235010)
    - Big Pepperwood Creek (219227) – flows from Mendocino County.
    - Rockpile Creek (231751) – flows from Mendocino County.
    - Buckeye Creek (220029)
      - Little Creek (227239)
      - North Fork Buckeye Creek (229647)
        - Osser Creek (230143)
        - Roy Creek (231987)
      - Soda Springs Creek (234853)
    - Wheatfield Fork (237594)
      - Fuller Creek (223983)
        - Sullivan Creek (235693)
        - Boyd Creek (219738)
        - North Fork Fuller Creek (229676)
        - South Fork Fuller Creek (235005)
      - Haupt Creek (225023)
      - Tobacco Creek (236406)
      - Elk Creek (223108)
      - House Creek (225688)
        - Soda Spring Creek (234845)
        - Allen Creek (218142)
        - Pepperwood Creek (230514)
          - Danfield Creek (222007)
            - Cow Creek (221691)
          - Jim Creek (226237)
          - Grasshopper Creek (224470)
        - Britain Creek (219851)
        - Cedar Creek (220760)
      - Wolf Creek (238086)
      - Tombs Creek (236448)
    - Marshall Creek (228139)
      - McKenzie Creek (228391)

==== Northern Sonoma Coast ====
Watercourses which feed into the Pacific Ocean in Sonoma County between the Gualala and Russian Rivers, numbered from north to south:

1. Deadman Gulch (222120)
2. Cannon Gulch (220545)
3. Chinese Gulch (221069)
4. Phillips Gulch (230598)
5. Miller Creek (228727)
6. Warren Creek (237257)
7. Wildcat Creek (237784)
8. Stockhoff Creek (235498)
9. Timber Cove Creek (236355)
10. Kolmer Gulch (226673)
11. Fort Ross Creek (223705)
12. Russian Gulch Creek (1723332)
  - East Branch Russian Gulch (222861)
    - Middle Branch Russian Gulch (228574)
    - West Branch Russian Gulch (237436)

==== The Russian River and its tributaries ====
- Russian River (267200) – flows from Mendocino County.
  - Willow Creek (237879)
  - Sheephouse Creek (232916)
  - Orrs Creek (230114)
  - Freezeout Creek (223863)
  - Austin Creek (218466)
    - Kohute Gulch (226672)
    - Kidd Creek (226569)
    - East Austin Creek (222846)
      - Black Rock Creek (219403)
      - Gilliam Creek (224171)
        - Schoolhouse Creek (232673)
      - Thompson Creek (236259)
      - Gray Creek (224517)
        - Lawhead Creek (234146)
      - Devil Creek (222279)
      - Conshea Creek (221468)
        - Tiny Creek (236385)
      - Sulphur Creek (235703)
    - Ward Creek (237225)
      - Big Oat Creek (219223)
      - Blue Jay Creek (219496)
      - Pole Mountain Creek (230900)
    - Bearpen Creek (218919)
    - Red Slide Creek (231390)
  - Dutch Bill Creek (222756)
    - Lancel Creek (226842)
      - North Fork Lancel Creek (229689)
  - Smith Creek (233315)
  - Hulbert Creek (253871)
    - Mission Creek (246001)
  - Livereau Creek (227433)
  - Fife Creek (223491)
    - Redwood Creek (231420)
  - Pocket Canyon (230836)
    - Mays Canyon (228268)
  - Hobson Creek (225380)
  - Green Valley Creek (224576)
    - Atascadero Creek (218443)
    - Purrington Creek (231100)
  - Mark West Creek (228118)
    - Windsor Creek (238013)
      - Pool Creek (230927)
    - Laguna de Santa Rosa (226766)
      - Santa Rosa Flood Control Channel (232565)
        - Abramson Creek
        - Piner Creek
          - Paulin Creek
        - Santa Rosa Creek (232563)
          - Matanzas Creek (228216)
            - Spring Creek (235241)
            - South Fork Matanzas Creek (235025)
          - Brush Creek (231600)
          - Salt Creek (232297)
      - Blucher Creek (219480)
      - Five Creek (223565)
      - Hinebaugh Creek (225359)
        - Crane Creek (221795)
      - Washoe Creek (237318)
        - Gossage Creek (224355)
      - Copeland Creek (221533)
    - Porter Creek (230952)
    - Humbug Creek (225753)
    - Van Buren Creek (236996)
  - Porter Creek (230951)
    - Press Creek (231039)
  - Dry Creek (222623) – flows from Mendocino County.
    - West Slough
      - Foss Creek (1657225)
        - Norton Slough (1657226)
    - Mill Creek (228686)
      - Felta Creek (223436)
      - Wallace Creek (237193)
      - Palmer Creek (230265)
    - Pine Ridge Canyon (230719)
    - Kelley Creek (226456)
    - Crane Creek (221794)
    - Grape Creek (224441)
      - Wine Creek (238037)
    - Peña Creek (230478)
      - Chapman Branch (220914)
      - Boyer Creek (219744)
      - Pechaco Creek (230457)
      - Redwood Log Creek (231443)
    - Dutcher Creek (222780)
    - Fall Creek (223368)
    - Schoolhouse Creek (232676)
    - Warm Springs Creek (237246)
      - Little Warm Springs Creek (227406)
      - Picnic Creek (230623)
      - Seven Oaks Creek (232821)
      - Bear Creek (218806)
      - Rancheria Creek (231215)
        - Little Rancheria Creek (234172)
      - Strawberry Creek (235583)
      - Little Strawberry Creek (227381)
      - Willow Springs Creek (237952)
      - Wild Cattle Creek (237748)
      - Bearpen Creek (218918)
      - Fall Creek (223365)
    - Brush Creek (219923)
      - Yorty Creek (238273)
    - Smith Creek (233325)
    - Cherry Creek (233660)
    - Galloway Creek (224021) – flows from Mendocino County.
    - Rail Creek (231170)
  - Maacama Creek (227883)
    - Franz Creek (223840)
      - Bidwell Creek (219108)
    - Redwood Creek (231421)
      - Foote Creek (223653)
      - Kellogg Creek (226462)
      - Yellowjacket Creek (238248)
    - Briggs Creek (219834)
      - Little Briggs Creek (227202)
      - Coon Creek (221498)
    - McDonnell Creek (228350)
  - Sausal Creek (232603)
    - George Young Creek (224117)
    - Burns Creek (220208)
    - Grapevine Creek (224446)
  - Gird Creek (224187)
  - Miller Creek (228731)
  - Gill Creek (224167)
  - Crocker Creek (221835)
  - Barrelli Creek (218695)
  - Porterfield Creek (230956)
  - Cloverdale Creek (221256)
  - Big Sulphur Creek (254619)
    - Little Sulphur Creek (227384)
      - North Branch (229605)
      - Lovers Gulch Creek (227735)
      - Anna Belcher Creek (218287)
    - Frasier Creek (223845) – flows from Mendocino County.
    - Squaw Creek (235310)
      - Alder Creek (218097) – flows from Mendocino County.
      - Hummingbird Creek (225758) – flows from Mendocino County.
  - Ash Creek (218427) – flows from Mendocino County.

==== Central Sonoma Coast ====
Watercourses which feed into the Pacific Ocean in Sonoma County between Goat Rock Beach and Bodega Head, numbered from north to south:

1. Scotty Creek (232742)
  - Rough Creek (231923)
2. Salmon Creek (232281)
  - Finley Creek (223507)
  - Coleman Valley Creek (221373)
  - Fay Creek (223419)
  - Tannery Creek (236018)
  - Nolan Creek (229570)
  - Thurston Creek (236333)

=== Bodega Bay ===
Watercourses which feed into Bodega Bay, numbered clockwise from Bodega Head to Sand Point:

1. Cheney Gulch (220937)
2. Shorttail Gulch (233054)
3. Estero Americano (223257)
  - Ebabias Creek (253711)
  - Americano Creek (254563)
4. Estero de San Antonio (253212)
  - Stemple Creek (253932)

=== Marin Coast ===
Watercourses which feed into the Pacific Ocean in Marin County south of Sand Point, listed from north to south:

==== Tomales Bay ====
Watercourses which feed into Tomales Bay, numbered clockwise from Sand Point to Tomales Point:

1. Walker Creek (255208)
  - Keys Creek (254852)
  - Chileno Creek (254740)
  - Frink Canyon (223952)
  - Verde Canyon (237053)
  - Salmon Creek (232280)
  - Arroyo Sausal (254577)
2. Millerton Gulch (228754)
3. Grand Canyon (224386)
4. Tomasini Canyon (236446)
5. Lagunitas Creek (255208)
  - Bear Valley Creek (pending)
  - Olema Creek (234410)
  - Nicasio Creek (229534)
    - Halleck Creek (224814)
      - Redwood Canyon (231415)
  - Barnabe Creek
  - San Geronimo Creek (232400)
  - Big Carson Creek (219156)
  - Cataract Creek (220721)
  - East Fork Lagunitas Creek (222888)
6. White Gulch (237641)

==== Point Reyes Peninsula ====
Watercourses which feed into the Pacific Ocean between Tomales Point and Bolinas, numbered north to south:

1. Home Ranch Creek (225499)
2. Glenbrook Creek
3. Muddy Hollow Creek
4. Santa Maria Creek
5. Coast Creek (233695)
6. Alamere Creek (233404)
7. Arroyo Hondo

==== Bolinas Lagoon ====
Watercourses which feed into Bolinas Lagoon, numbered clockwise from Bolinas to Stinson Beach:

1. Pine Gulch Creek (234476)
  - Copper Mine Gulch (221541)
2. Wilkins Gulch (237829)
3. Pike County Gulch (230651)
4. Audubon Canyon (218457)
5. Volunteer Canyon (1808968)
6. Morses Gulch (229094)
7. McKinnan Gulch (228412)
8. Stinson Gulch (235491)

==== Southern Marin Coast ====
Watercourses which feed into the Pacific Ocean between Stinson Beach and the Golden Gate, numbered north to south:

1. Webb Creek (237375)
2. Lone Tree Creek (227525)
3. Cold Stream (221345)
4. Redwood Creek (231428)
  - Fern Creek (223455)
5. Tennessee Valley (255127)

== San Francisco Bay and its tributaries ==
=== Northern San Francisco Bay ===
Watercourses which feed into San Francisco Bay and its tributary bays between the Golden Gate and Point San Pedro, numbered south to north:

1. Coyote Creek (221733)
2. Arroyo Corte Madera del Presidio (254575)
  - Old Mill Creek (229976)
    - Cascade Creek (220661)
3. San Clemente Creek (217925)
4. Corte Madera Creek (Marin County, California) (258743)
  - Tamalpais Creek (235983)
  - Ross Creek (231905)
  - San Anselmo Creek (232364)
    - Sleepy Hollow Creek (249570)
    - Fairfax Creek (223329)
    - Carey Camp Creek (220595)
    - Cascade Creek (220663)
5. San Rafael Creek (232467)

=== Northern San Pablo Bay and Carquinez Strait ===
Watercourses which feed into San Pablo Bay or the Carquinez Strait between Point San Pedro and the Benicia-Martinez Bridge, numbered west to east:

1. Gallinas Creek (224018)
  - South Fork Gallinas Creek (235006)
2. Miller Creek (228730)
3. Novato Creek (229802)
  - Arroyo San Jose (218406)
  - Bowman Canyon (219721)
4. Petaluma River (253749)
  - Black John Slough (219372)
    - Rush Creek (232023)
    - Basalt Creek (218716)
  - Tule Slough (236607)
  - San Antonio Creek (253817)
  - Schultz Slough (232702)
  - Adobe Creek (217990)
  - Washington Creek
    - East Washington Creek
  - Lynch Creek (234217)
  - Capri Creek
  - Lichau Creek (234157)
    - Willow Brook (269133)
5. Tolay Creek (236414)
6. Sonoma Creek (234882)
  - Napa Slough (229414)
  - East Branch (222851)
  - Second Napa Slough (232776)
    - Third Napa Slough (236244)
      - Railroad Slough (231180)
      - Steamboat Slough (235419)
        - Schell Slough (232647)
          - Schell Creek (232645)
            - Arroyo Seco Creek (218408)
              - Nathanson Creek (229419)
              - Haraszthy Creek (224911)
  - China Slough (221058)
  - Fowler Creek (223770)
    - Rodgers Creek (231809)
      - Champlin Creek (220901)
    - Felder Creek (223431)
      - Lewis Creek (262425)
    - Carriger Creek (220639)
  - Agua Caliente Creek (218327)
  - Hooker Creek (225537)
    - Wilson Creek (237965)
      - Butler Canyon (220277)
      - Whitman Canyon (237706)
  - Calabazas Creek (254687)
    - Stuart Creek (235613)
  - Graham Creek (224379)
  - Yulupa Creek (238301)
  - Bear Creek (218803)
7. Napa River (255110)
  - Napa Slough (229414)
    - Devils Slough (222329)
    - Huichica Creek (225741)
  - White Slough (237683)
    - Rindler Creek (231615)
      - Blue Rock Springs Creek (219520)
  - American Canyon Creek (218229)
  - Carneros Creek (220626)
  - Suscol Creek (235838)
  - Tulucay Creek (255164)
    - Kreuse Creek (226687)
    - Murphy Creek (229347)
  - Milliken Creek (234307)
    - Sarco Creek (232579)
  - Napa Creek (229413)
    - Redwood Creek (231429)
  - Soda Creek (234828)
  - Dry Creek (233800)
  - Conn Creek (233707)
    - Rector Creek (234547)
    - Sage Creek (234602)
      - Clear Creek (233687)
    - Chiles Creek (233665)
      - Moore Creek (229017)
  - Bale Slough (218624)
  - Sulphur Creek (235712)
  - York Creek (238269)
  - Mill Creek (228685)
  - Ritchey Creek (252565)
  - Nash Creek (229417)
8. Southampton Creek

=== Lake Berryessa ===
Watercourses which feed into Lake Berryessa, numbered clockwise from Monticello Dam:

1. Wragg Creek (238192)
2. Capell Creek (220581)
3. Smittle Creek (234731)
4. Trout Creek (236563)
5. Pope Creek (234501)
  - Maxwell Creek (228249)
    - Hardin Creek (261085)
    - Burton Creek (220252)
6. Stone Corral Creek (253935)
7. Butts Creek (233590) – flows from Lake County.
  - Routan Creek (234593) – flows from Lake County.
  - Snell Creek (234752)
8. Putah Creek (234522) – flows from Lake County.
  - Hunting Creek (225798)
9. Cement Creek (220810)
10. Dyer Creek (222789)
11. Eticuera Creek (223262)
  - Adams Creek (217966)
  - Nevada Creek (229475)
  - Zim Zim Creek (238320)

=== Suisun Bay and Grizzly Bay ===
Watercourses which feed into Suisun Bay and Grizzly Bay, listed clockwise from Benicia to Martinez:

- Sulphur Springs Creek (235735)
- Suisun Slough (253945)
  - Cordelia Slough (221556)
    - Green Valley Creek (224575)
      - Wild Horse Creek (237756)
- Montezuma Slough (234323)
- Sacramento River (1654949) – flows from Sacramento County
  - American River
- San Joaquin River (273488) – flows from Sacramento County

For tributaries of the Sacramento and San Joaquin Rivers, see List of rivers in California.

- Mount Diablo Creek (234334)
- Hastings Slough (225003)
  - Seal Creek
- Pacheco Creek (230192)
  - Grayson Creek (224526)
    - Murderer's Creek
  - Walnut Creek (237199)
    - Galindo Creek (224011)
    - Grayson Creek (224526)
    - Pine Creek (Contra Costa County)
    - San Ramon Creek (232471)
      - Las Trampas Creek (226900)
        - Grizzly Creek (224628)
        - Lafayette Creek (226748)
        - Reliez Creek
        - Tice Creek (236338)
      - Green Valley Creek (224574)
      - Sycamore Creek (235918)
      - Bollinger Canyon Creek (254643)
- Peyton Creek

=== Southern Carquinez Strait and San Pablo Bay ===
Watercourses which feed into the Carquinez Strait or San Pablo Bay between the Benicia-Martinez Bridge and Point San Pablo, numbered east to west:

1. Arroyo del Hambre (255059)
  - Alhambra Creek (218119)
2. Bull Valley Creek
3. Elkhorn Creek
4. Edwards Creek
5. Cañada del Cierbo (220523)
6. Rodeo Creek (231801)
7. Refugio Creek (231480)
  - Ohlone Creek
8. Pinole Creek (230743)
9. Garrity Creek (224083)
10. Rheem Creek
  - Karlson Creek
11. San Pablo Creek (232457)
  - Lauterwasser Creek (226957)
  - Bear Creek (218800)
12. Castro Creek (220706)
  - Herman Slough
  - Wildcat Creek (237791)

=== Northeastern San Francisco Bay ===
Watercourses which feed into the east shore of San Francisco Bay between Point San Pablo and the Bay Bridge, numbered north to south:

1. Meeker Slough
2. Baxter/Stege Creek
3. Fluvius Innominatus/Central Creek
4. Cerrito Creek (254734)
5. Middle/Blackberry Creek
6. Schoolhouse Creek
7. Codornices Creek (254755)
  - Marin/Village Creek
8. Strawberry Creek (235581)
9. Potter Creek
10. Derby Creek
11. Temescal Creek (236092)

=== Eastern San Francisco Bay ===
Watercourses which feed into the east shore of San Francisco Bay between the Bay Bridge and the San Mateo–Hayward Bridge, numbered from north to south:

1. Glen Echo Creek (224215)
2. Indian Gulch (225879)
3. Sausal Creek (232602)
  - Shephard Creek (232958)
  - Palo Seco Creek (230277)
4. Peralta Creek (230520)
5. Lion Creek (227172)
  - Arroyo Viejo (218410)
6. Elmhurst Creek
7. San Leandro Creek (232428)
  - Redwood Creek (231419)
  - Miller Creek
  - Kaiser Creek (254842)
    - Buckhorn Creek (220052)
  - Moraga Creek
  - Indian Creek (225858)
8. San Lorenzo Creek (232434)
  - Castro Valley Creek
    - Chabot Creek
  - Crow Creek (233742)
    - Cull Creek (221904)
    - Norris Creek (229589)
    - Bolinas Creek (219604)
  - Palomares Creek (230280)
  - Eden Canyon Creek (222968)
9. Sulphur Creek (235709)
10. Ward Creek (237227)

=== Southeastern San Francisco Bay ===
Watercourses which feed into the east shore of San Francisco Bay between the San Mateo–Hayward Bridge and the Dumbarton Bridge, listed north to south:

- Mount Eden Creek (229145)
  - North Creek (229624)
- Alameda Creek (1654946)
  - Dry Creek (222606)
  - Stonybrook Canyon (235553)
  - Arroyo de la Laguna (218389)
    - Vallecitos Creek (236963)
    - Sinbad Creek (233170)
    - Arroyo Valle (255060)
      - Arroyo Bayo (218394)
      - San Antonio Creek (232367)
    - Arroyo Mocho (218404)
      - Arroyo Las Positas (218402)
        - Arroyo Seco (218407)
    - South San Ramon Creek (235109)
      - Alamo Creek (218055)
      - Coyote Creek (221729)
  - Sheridan Creek (234690)
  - San Antonio Creek (1654950)
    - Indian Creek (225864)
    - Apperson Creek (218316)
    - La Costa Creek
    - Williams Gulch (237847)
  - Pirates Creek (230775)
  - Haynes Gulch (225064)
  - Welch Creek
  - Calaveras Creek (254688)
    - Arroyo Hondo (233435)
      - Isabel Creek (254822)
        - Long Branch (227538)
        - Bonita Creek (219639)
      - Smith Creek (233323)
        - Sulphur Creek

=== Southern San Francisco Bay ===
Watercourses which feed into the San Francisco Bay south of the Dumbarton Bridge, listed clockwise:

- Newark Slough (229511)
  - Plummer Creek
- Mowry Slough (229219)
- Mud Slough (229250)
  - Laguna Creek
    - Agua Caliente Creek (218017)
    - Cañada Del Aliso (220520)
    - Sabercat/Sabre Cat Creek
      - Washington Creek
    - Mission Creek (228831)
      - Morrison Creek (229079)
      - Vargas Creek
- Coyote Creek (255083)
  - Scott Creek (232723)
  - Line C – man-made drain, connecting creeks which historically dispersed into marsh
    - Toroges Creek (236468)
    - Agua Fria Creek (218018)
  - Lower Penitencia Creek
    - Calera Creek
      - Berryessa Creek
        - Arroyo de los Coches
        - Piedmont Creek
  - Upper Penitencia Creek
    - Arroyo Aguague
  - Lower Silver Creek
    - Miguelita Creek
    - Babb Creek (218488)
    - South Babb Creek (234920)
    - Thompson Creek
  - Upper Silver Creek
  - Las Animas Creek (226891)
    - San Felipe Creek (234625)
- Guadalupe River (253220)
  - Alamitos Creek (218054)
    - Arroyo Calero (218395)
  - Guadalupe Creek (253236)
    - Hicks Creek (Cherry Springs: 220964)
    - Pheasant Creek (230590)
  - Canoas Creek (254700)
  - Los Gatos Creek (227672)
  - Ross Creek (231908)
- Guadalupe Slough (224698)
  - Saratoga Creek (253826)
    - San Tomas Aquino Creek (232477)
      - Smith Creek
  - Calabazas Creek (220373)
    - Prospect Creek (253793)
    - Regnart Creek
- Stevens Creek (1667885)
  - Heney Creek
  - Gold Mine Creek
  - Indian Creek
  - Bay Creek
  - Gold Mine Creek
  - Swiss Creek
  - Montebello Creek
- Permanente Creek (234449)
  - Hale Creek (224788)
- Adobe Creek (217989)
  - Purisima Creek (253797)
  - Barron Creek (239012)
- Matadero Creek (228215)
  - Arastradero Creek (218335)
  - Deer Creek (253877)
- San Francisquito Creek (232397)
  - Corte Madera Creek (254779)
    - Sausal Creek (1654941)
      - Alambique Creek (218044)
      - Dennis Martin Creek (228169)
  - Bear Creek (218820)
    - Dry Creek
    - West Union Creek
  - Los Trancos Creek (254941)

=== Western San Francisco Bay ===
Watercourses which feed into the west shore of San Francisco Bay between the Dumbarton Bridge and the Golden Gate, listed south to north:

- Redwood Creek (255118)
  - Arroyo Ojo de Agua (238759)
- Cordilleras Creek (221557)
- Pulgas Creek (234518)
- Belmont Creek (254600)
- Laurel Creek (226937)
- Borel Creek
  - Beresford Creek
- Leslie Creek
- San Mateo Creek (1655002)
  - San Andreas Creek
  - Laguna Creek
  - Polhemus Creek (230901)
- Poplar Creek
- Burlingame Creek
  - Upper Terrace Creek
  - Ralston Creek
  - Cherry Canyon Creek
- Sanchez Creek (232485)
  - Lower Terrace Creek
- Easton Creek (233826)
- Mills Creek (234308)
- Millbrae Creek
- Green Hills Creek
- San Bruno Creek (234623)
  - El Zanjon
- Colma Creek (221398)
  - Twelvemile Creek
- Guadalupe Valley Creek (224700)
- Visitation Valley Creek
- Yosemite Creek
- Islais Creek (254827)
  - Precita Creek
- Mission Creek
  - Hayes Creek
  - Arroyo Dolores
- El Polin Creek (Tennessee Valley)
- Dragonfly Creek

== Pacific Coast south of the Golden Gate ==
=== San Francisco Coast ===
Watercourses which feed into the Pacific Ocean between the Golden Gate and Thornton Beach, from north to south:

- Lobos Creek (227449)

=== Northern San Mateo Coast ===
Watercourses which feed into the Pacific Ocean between Thornton Beach and Miramontes Point, numbered north to south:

1. Milagra Creek
2. Calera Creek
3. Rockaway Creek
4. San Pedro Creek (234639)
  - North Fork (234373)
  - Middle Fork (234291)
  - South Fork (235049)
5. San Vicente Creek (234642)
6. Denniston Creek (233779)
7. Arroyo de en Medio (233428)
8. Naples Creek
9. Frenchmans Creek (233909)
  - Locks Creek (234179)
10. Pilarcitos Creek (253889)
  - Arroyo León (233436)
    - Mills Creek (228769)
  - Madonna Creek (227924)
  - Apanolio Creek (233421)
  - Corinda Los Trancos Creek (233718)
  - Nuff Creek (234390)
    - North Branch
    - South Branch

=== Central San Mateo Coast ===
Watercourses which feed into the Pacific Ocean between Miramontes Point and Pigeon Point, numbered north to south:

1. Cañada Verde Creek (1786133)
2. Purisima Creek (253798)
  - Whittemore Gulch (237717)
  - Walker Gulch (237174)
  - Grabtown Gulch (224371)
  - Soda Gulch (234832)
3. Lobitos Creek (254929)
  - Schoolhouse Creek (232672)
  - Rogers Gulch (231823)
4. Tunitas Creek (236624)
  - Dry Creek (222617)
  - East Fork (222904)
  - Rings Gulch (234568)
  - Mitchell Creek (228864)
5. San Gregorio Creek (232403)
  - Coyote Creek (221728)
  - Clear Creek (221185)
  - El Corte de Madera Creek
  - Bogess Creek (219583)
  - Kingston Creek (226613)
  - Harrington Creek (224956)
  - Alpine Creek (254555)
    - Mindego Creek (228782)
  - La Honda Creek (226707)
    - Woodruff Creek (238152)
    - Weeks Creek (237398)
      - Spanish Ranch Creek (235161)
6. Pomponio Creek (230913)
7. Long Gulch (227559)
8. Dairy Gulch (221978)
9. Pescadero Creek (234452) – flows from Santa Cruz County
  - Butano Creek (220266)
    - Little Butano Creek (227209)
    - South Fork (234979)
  - Bradley Creek (219762)
    - Chandler Gulch (220906)
  - Honsinger Creek (225527)
    - Windmill Gulch (238011)
    - Big Chicken Hollow (219158)
    - Little Chicken Hollow (227221)
  - Newell Gulch (229514)
  - Roy Gulch (231988)
  - Bloomquist Creek (219470)
  - Peterson Creek (230568)
  - McCormick Creek (228321)
  - Hoffman Creek (225382)
  - Jones Gulch (226336)
  - Harwood Creek (224997)
  - Dark Gulch (222021)
  - Carriger Creek (220638)
  - Keyston Creek (226557)
  - Tarwater Creek (236033)
  - Rhododendron Creek (231522)
  - Peters Creek (230562)
    - Evans Creek (223287)
    - Bear Creek (218799)
    - Lambert Creek (226834)
  - Fall Creek (223364)
  - Slate Creek (233236)
  - Oil Creek (229945)
  - Little Boulder Creek (227199) – flows from Santa Cruz County
  - Waterman Creek (237336)
10. Arroyo de los Frijoles (218391)
11. Spring Bridge Gulch (235229)
12. Yankee Jim Gulch (238228)

=== Southern San Mateo Coast ===
Watercourses which feed into the Pacific Ocean south of Pigeon Point, numbered north to south:

1. Gazos Creek (224105) – flows from Santa Cruz County.
  - Old Womans Creek (229991) – flows from Santa Cruz County.
  - Old Womans Creek (1701701)
2. Whitehouse Creek (237690) – flows from Santa Cruz County.
3. Cascade Creek (220660) – flows from Santa Cruz County.
4. Green Oaks Creek (224554) – flows from Santa Cruz County.
5. Año Nuevo Creek (254567) – flows from Santa Cruz County.
  - Cold Dip Creek (252424) – flows from Santa Cruz County.
6. Finney Creek (223512) – flows from Santa Cruz County.
7. Elliot Creek (223153) – flows from Santa Cruz County.

== See also ==
- Hydrography of the San Francisco Bay Area
- List of lakes in the San Francisco Bay Area
- List of rivers of California
