= Rockaway Creek (California) =

Creek in Rockaway Beach, Pacifica, California

Coordinates: 37°36′31″N 122°29′50″W

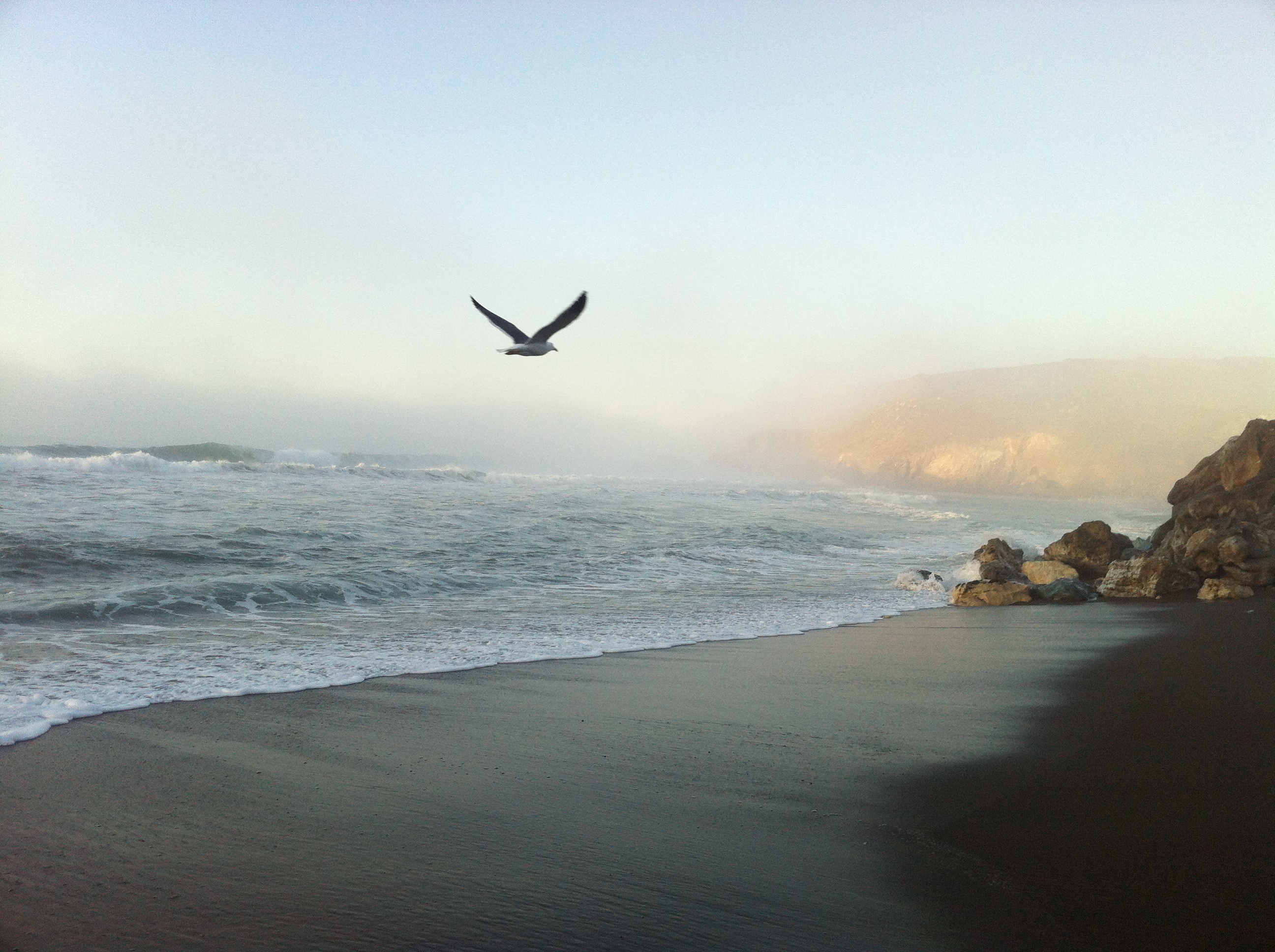
Sea Gull at Rockaway Beach

Rockaway Creek is a small creek in the Rockaway Beach neighborhood of Pacifica, California. It is located just south of Calera Creek.

== See also ==
- List of watercourses in the San Francisco Bay Area
