= Shepherd Creek =

Shepherd Creek may refer to:

- Shephard Creek (Alameda County, California), the north fork of Sausal Creek
- Shepherd Creek (Inyo County, California), a tributary of the Los Angeles Aqueduct along the Sierra Crest
