= Lafayette Creek =

Lafayette Creek may refer to:

- Lafayette Creek (California)
- Lafayette Creek (Florida)
