= Rockaway Creek =

Rockaway Creek may refer to:

- Rockaway Creek (California), in the Rockaway Beach neighborhood of Pacifica, California
- Rockaway Creek (New Jersey), a tributary of the Lamington River in central New Jersey

== See also ==
- Rockaway River, a tributary of the Passaic River, in northern New Jersey
