= Rodeo Creek =

Location
- Country: United States
- State: California
- Region: Contra Costa County
- City: Rodeo, California

Physical characteristics
- Source: Franklin Ridge
  - location: 2 mi (3 km) southwest of Martinez, California
  - coordinates: 37°58′58″N 122°9′48″W
  - elevation: 980 ft (300 m)
- Mouth: San Pablo Bay
  - location: Rodeo, California
  - coordinates: 38°2′21″N 122°16′3″W
  - elevation: 7 ft (2.1 m)

Rodeo Creek is an 8.3-mile-long (13.4 km) intermittent stream in western Contra Costa County, California running through the town of Rodeo to San Pablo Bay.

== History ==
Rodeo Valley appears on a plat of the Rancho El Pinole in 1860 and Rodeo Creek on another in 1865.

== Watershed and course ==
The Rodeo Creek watershed drains about 10 square miles (26 km^{2}), gathering flows from numerous small tributaries originating on the southwest slopes of Franklin Ridge. The creek flows in a generally north to northwesterly direction approximately 8.3 miles (13.4 km) to San Pablo Bay. The town of Rodeo has a 1.1 miles (1.8 km) flood control channel.

Since 1874, the Union Pacific Railroad (then known as the Southern Pacific Railroad) traversed the shoreline at the mouth of Rodeo Creek. In 1890 the Rodeo Dam and Reservoir were constructed in the lower watershed but was decommissioned and used for fill to construct the Interstate 80 crossing. Further up Rodeo Creek it is also transected by Highway 4.

== Ecology ==
Threatened and/or endangered species that inhabit the middle watershed include Western pond turtle (Actinemys marmorata), Alameda whipsnake (Masticophis lateralis euryxanthus), Cooper's hawk (Astur cooperii) and in the middle and lower watershed, California red-legged frog (Rana draytonii). The Rodeo Creek watershed also hosts the only population of federally endangered Contra Costa goldfields (Lasthenia conjugens).

The watershed is mostly grasslands but a mix of coast live oak (Quercus agrifolia)/California bay laurel (Umbellularia californica) woodland and valley oak (Quercus lobata) woodland inhabits northern facing hillslopes in the upper watershed and there is an unusually high diversity of oak tree species, with five species found in the watershed.

Electrofishing in 1974,1981 and 1994 did not reveal steelhead trout. Two grade-control drop structures from the flood control channel in the lower watershed are partial barriers to fish passage since the early 1960s, however, early land use activities in the late 1800s had the first and perhaps most profound impacts upon anadromous fish. Fish surveys in 1984 observed hitch, Sacramento pikeminnow, California roach, Sacramento sucker, three-spined stickleback and non-native mosquito fish at various sites in the lower watershed.

The John Muir Land Trust (MHLT) owns three properties in the watershed, the 702 acre Fernandez Ranch and 483 acre Franklin Canyon property.

== See also ==
- List of watercourses in the San Francisco Bay Area
