= Dairy Gulch =

Valley in San Mateo County, California, United States of America

Coordinates: 37.286888°N 122.407753°W

Geology
- Type: Valley

Geography
- Location: San Mateo County, California, U.S.
- Country: United States
- State/Province: California
- Interactive map of Dairy Gulch

Dairy Gulch is a valley in San Mateo County, California. It contains a stream which is a tributary of San Gregorio Creek.

== See also ==
- List of watercourses in the San Francisco Bay Area
