= Sausal Creek (Alameda County) =

Sausal Creek Arroyo Del Bosque
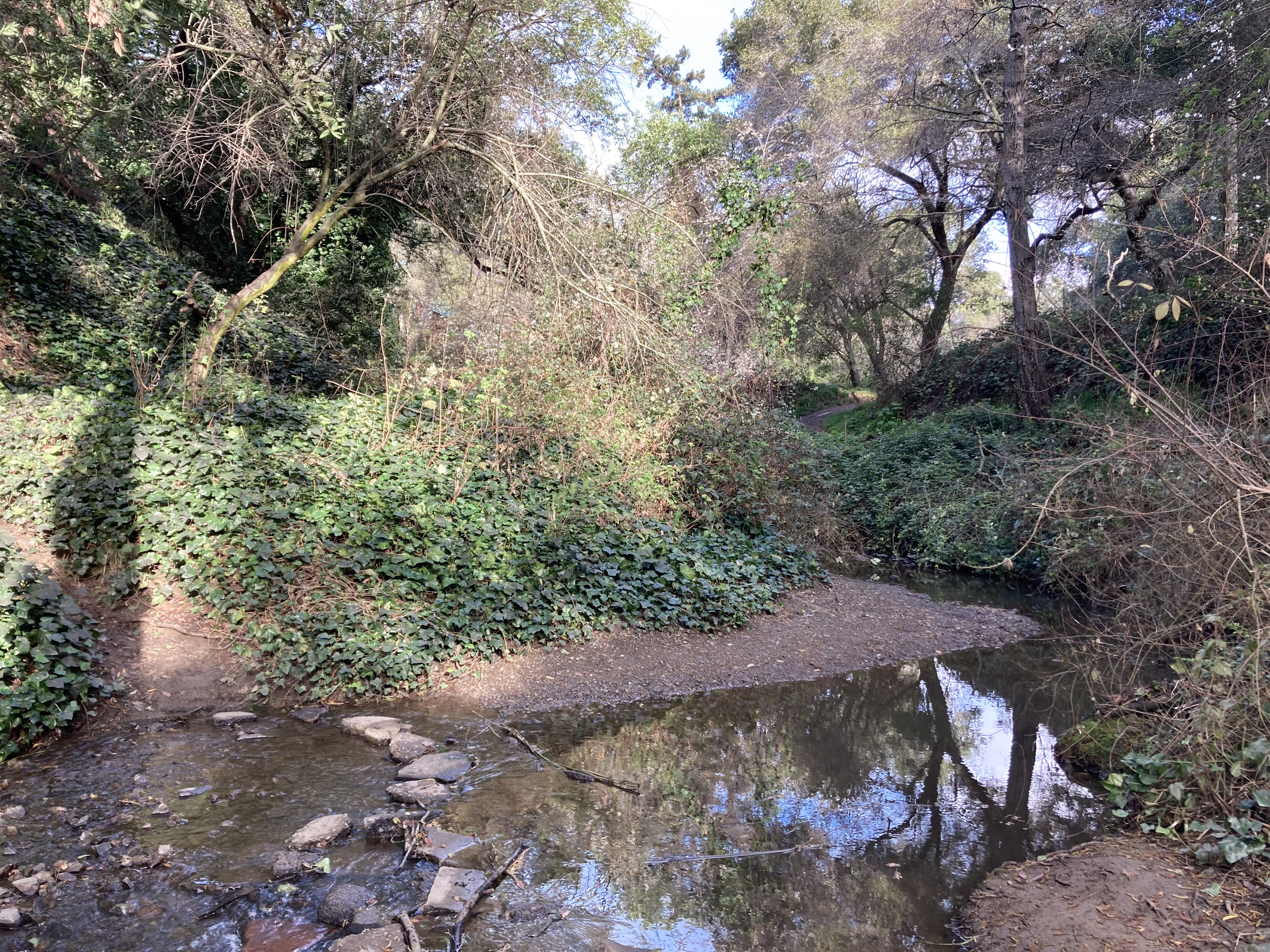

- Location of the mouth of Sausal Creek in California

Location
- Country: United States
- State: California
- Region: Alameda County
- City: Oakland, California

Physical characteristics
- Source: Shepherd Creek
  - location: near Shepherd Canyon Road, Oakland
  - coordinates: 37°50′1″N 122°11′27″W
- 2nd source: Palo Seco Creek
  - location: near Joaquin Miller Road, Joaquin Miller Park
  - coordinates: 37°48′33″N 122°10′31″W
- Source confluence
  - location: Dimond Park, Oakland
  - coordinates: 37°49′8″N 122°12′21″W
  - elevation: 453 ft (138 m)
- Mouth: culvert to San Francisco Bay
  - location: near Derby Avenue, Oakland
  - coordinates: 37°46′45″N 122°13′38″W
  - elevation: 49 ft (15 m)

Sausal Creek, 3.1 miles (5.0 km) long, is one of the principal creeks in Oakland, California.

The creek derives its name from the Spanish word for willow grove (sausal). Native arroyo willows were once common along its banks. Efforts are underway to restore the willows and the creek itself. A volunteer group, Friends of Sausal Creek, helps remove invasive species and plant native species. Some of the invasive species in the Sausal Creek watershed include Monterey pine trees, ivy, French broom, and wild mustard.

== Course ==
The North fork of the creek, also known as Shepherd Creek, begins in the hills above Oakland, flowing down Shepherd Canyon, named for an early landowner at the top of the canyon, William J. Shepherd. The South fork, also known as Palo Seco Creek, also begins in the hills, and flows down Palo Seco Canyon to a confluence with the north fork in the linear valley where the Montclair district is situated. The creek then cuts through the shutter ridge which defines the linear valley (formed by the Hayward Fault), and runs down to the flatlands through Dimond Canyon, where it passes under historic Leimert Bridge. It then runs southwest through the San Antonio district to empty into the Oakland Estuary. The creek is mostly open in the hills section, and runs in culverts as it approaches the bay.

== History ==
The first inhabitants of the Sausal Creek watershed were the Huchiun or Yrgin tribelets of the Ohlone people. They harvested acorns, buckeyes and other foodstuffs at a time when enormous live oaks, alders, willows, and big-leaf maples grew on the creek's banks in what is now downtown Oakland, California. Also, large Coast redwoods (Sequoia sempervirens) grew on the ridge where Skyline Boulevard now runs.

Sausal Creek was named Arroyo del Bosque by Father Juan Crespí during the Pedro Fages Expedition in 1772. Later the Sausal watershed became part of the Rancho San Antonio land grant to Sergeant Luis Maria Peralta in 1820. By 1841 Peralta's descendants were selling the giant redwoods and by 1850 there were at least ten sawmills operating in the watershed. The Blossom Rock Tree had a trunk diameter of 33.5 feet and was over 300 feet tall. It was so named because sailors used it as a navigational aid to avoid an underwater hazardous rock, Blossom Rock, in San Francisco Bay.

The creek was also known as Fruitvale Creek, when the settlement of Fruitvale was established in 1856 when Quaker nurseryman Henderson Luelling, planted hundreds of cherry trees along Sausal Creek, and named the area "Fruit Vale".

As Oakland grew larger, the Sausal Creek watershed was significantly altered. When people built their houses next to Sausal Creek, they often planted gardens, which brought in plants from around the globe. Over time, since many of these plants were foreign, they were not adapted to the environment, and they could not be controlled.

In 1935, the Works Progress Administration began work deep in the canyon. Initially they were funded to clear landslides and build fire trails. In 1937, the WPA constructed a sanitary sewer that runs adjacent to Sausal Creek under the creek-side trail that runs from Dimond Park to slightly beyond the Leimert Bridge. In 1939 and 1940, further work was done to channelize the creek in concrete and stabilize its banks. The creek still ran, but at a quickening pace. What had once been a slow, babbling brook was now a torrential storm. Culverts soon covered the creek. In the 1980s, behind the Cohen-Bray House, on 29th Avenue near International Boulevard, preservationists fought over a culvert project that preservationists thought would deal a blow to a neighborhood rife with drugs and crime.

== Restoration projects ==
Attitudes about Sausal Creek have changed and now benefits from citizen and government support. In 1996, the Friends of Sausal Creek was formed with support from the City of Oakland, the Aquatic Outreach Institute (now called The Watershed Project), and the Alameda County Flood Control and Water Conservation District. The group is interested in the entire Sausal Creek Watershed, and has organized clean-up hikes within the canyon, water quality monitoring of the creek, and has planted a native plant garden and a riparian restoration site at the lower end of the hiking trail in Dimond Park.

In 2015, the Sausal Creek Restoration Project removed 250 feet of culvert, widened the existing creek to create a more stable, natural and diverse riparian corridor, and added native plants and trees.

== See also ==
- List of watercourses in the San Francisco Bay Area
- San Leandro Creek
- Temescal Creek
