= Schoolhouse Creek (San Mateo County, California) =

Stream in California, United States

Schoolhouse Creek is a small river in San Mateo County, California and is a tributary of Lobitos Creek a larger river.

37.38272°N 122.400807°W

== See also ==
- List of watercourses in the San Francisco Bay Area
