= Wheatfield Fork Gualala River =

- Location of the mouth in California
- Native name: bahla· biʔda (Kashaya)

Location
- Country: United States
- State: California
- Region: Sonoma County

Physical characteristics
- Source
  - location: 8 mi (10 km) southwest of Cloverdale, California
  - coordinates: 38°44′53″N 123°8′43″W
  - elevation: 1,700 ft (520 m)
- Mouth: South Fork Gualala River
  - location: east of Sea Ranch, California
  - coordinates: 38°42′5″N 123°24′57″W
  - elevation: 59 ft (18 m)

Basin features
- Tributaries
  - left: House Creek

The Wheatfield Fork Gualala River is a 35.1-mile-long (56.5 km) stream in the mountains of western Sonoma County, California which empties into the South Fork Gualala River just east of Sea Ranch, California.

== Course ==
Tributaries include:

- Fuller Creek
- Haupt Creek
- Tobacco Creek
- Elk Creek
- House Creek
- Wolf Creek
- Tombs Creek

== Habitat and pollution ==
As of 2000, the Wheatfield Fork and all its major tributaries supported steelhead trout.

== Recreational paddling ==
After a significant amount of rainfall, the Wheatfield Fork has enough water for kayaking. It contains a 9.3 mile class 1 wilderness section, an 8.7 mile class 1 section near a road, and a steeper class 2+ section.

== Bridges ==
The Wheatfield Fork is spanned by a 572-foot (174 m) bridge at Annapolis Road, about 1.7 mi (3 km) east of State Route 1. The bridge was built in 1974.

== See also ==
- List of rivers in California
- List of watercourses in the San Francisco Bay Area
