= Rogers Gulch =

Valley in California, United States

Coordinates: 37.392719°N 122.393029°W

Rogers Gulch is a small river in San Mateo County, California. It contains a small stream which is a tributary of Lobitos Creek.

== See also ==
- List of watercourses in the San Francisco Bay Area
