= Reliez Creek =

Creek in the San Francisco Bay Area

Reliez Creek Raliez Creek, Reesly Creek
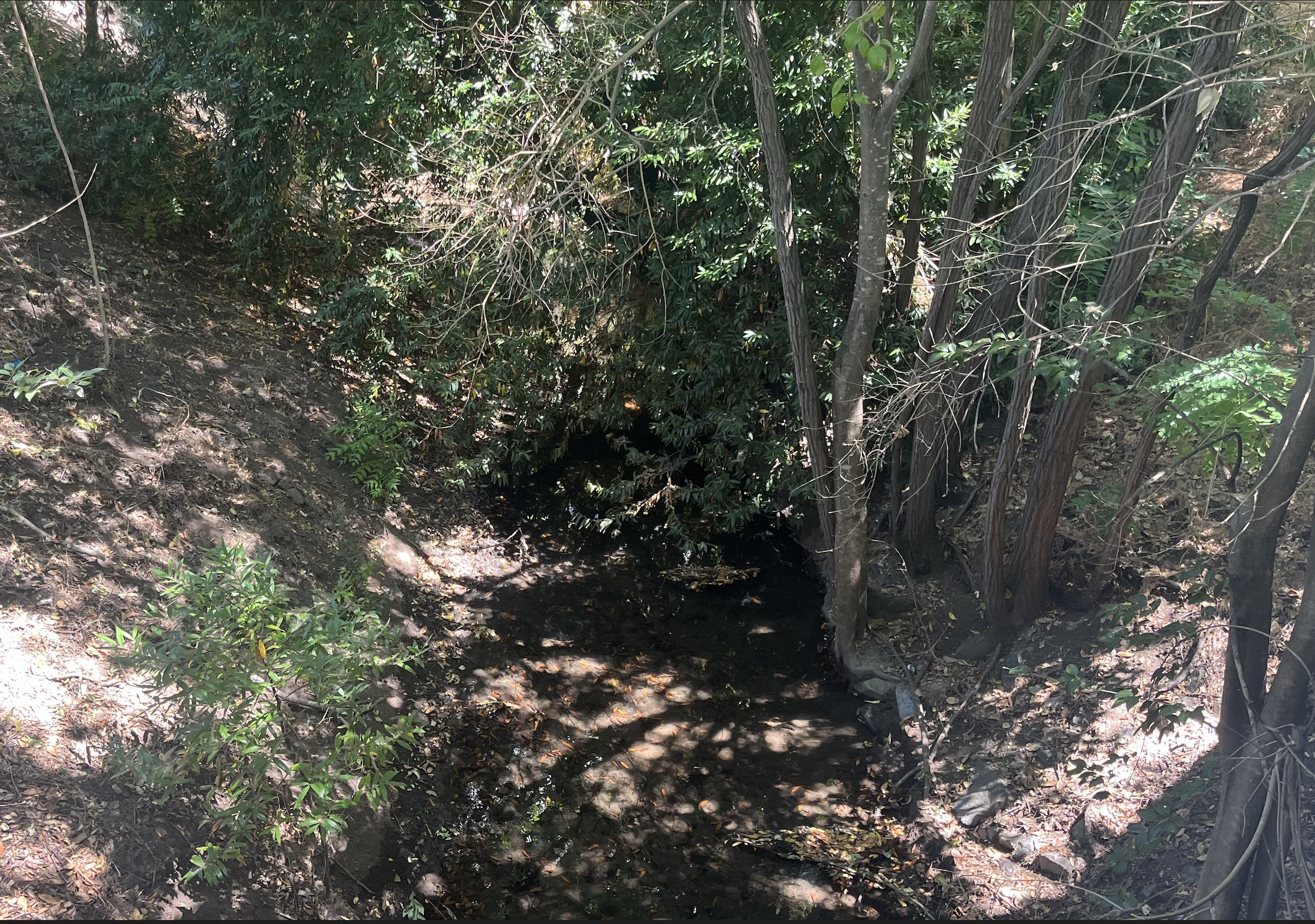
- Reliez Creek in Lafayette, California. Suburban runoff greatly impacts the flow and water quality in Reliez Creek (July 31st, 2024)

- Location of the mouth of Reliez Creek in the San Francisco Bay Area

Location
- Country: United States
- State: California
- County: Contra Costa County, California

Physical characteristics
- Source
  - location: Lafayette, California
- Mouth
  - location: Las Trampas Creek
  - coordinates: 37°53′14.13″N 122°05′24.89″W
- Length: 4 m (13 ft)

Reliez Creek is an approximately 4 mile (6.44 km) long creek in Lafayette, California, in the San Francisco Bay Area. It is a tributary to Las Trampas Creek and the Walnut Creek watershed.

== Course ==
Reliez Creek begins as a number of intermittent streams on the east side of Lafayette Ridge, in Lafayette, California in Briones Regional Park. After exiting the park, Reliez Creek enters the suburban community of Reliez Valley, California, where its character shifts drastically to that of an urban stream, with downcut banks, exotic plants and high levels of pollutants. For most of its length, the creek runs through a natural channel.

== Geography ==
Reliez Creek is located in one of California's most densely populated and developed areas, the East Bay, home to 2.8 million people. It is one of the multiple streams running through the suburban community of Lafayette, California. Many modern maps of the area omit Reliez Creek.

The creek runs through the grounds of Acalanes High School

Suburban and commercial developments line its banks for nearly the entirety of its course, though the creek itself runs through a largely natural channel.

== History ==
During construction of a housing development near the junction of Las Trampas, Lafayette, and Reliez Creeks in 2004, a very large indigenous burial ground and village site were disturbed, with a subsequent archaeological dig uncovering more than 50 sets of human remains interred at the site. The presence of a burial ground and village along its banks highlights the material and spiritual significance of Reliez Creek to the local native population in historic times. The site is now occupied by a gated residential community.

== Ecology ==
Reliez Creek is characteristic of many suburban streams in California, with high levels of pollutants and fine sediments.

Invasive species like Arundo donax and English ivy (Hedera helix) are common along Reliez Creek and outcompete native plants for resources.

=== Steelhead Trout Population ===
Historically an anadromous form of rainbow trout, steelhead, would ascend Reliez Creek and other creeks in the Walnut Creek watershed to spawn. During the 19th and 20th centuries, however, land use changes, overfishing, alterations to its channel and flow, and the construction of large-scale residential tracts caused the extirpation of trout in Reliez Creek. Additionally, there are 15 structures installed in Reliez Creek that inhibit and in some cases completely prevent the passage of fish upstream.

Due to the lack of gravels and high sediment load, as well as pollutants and high water temperatures, Reliez Creek is of limited value to steelhead trout today.

== See also ==
- Las Trampas Creek
- Walnut Creek
- East Bay
