= Lobitos Creek =

Stream in San Mateo County, California, U.S.

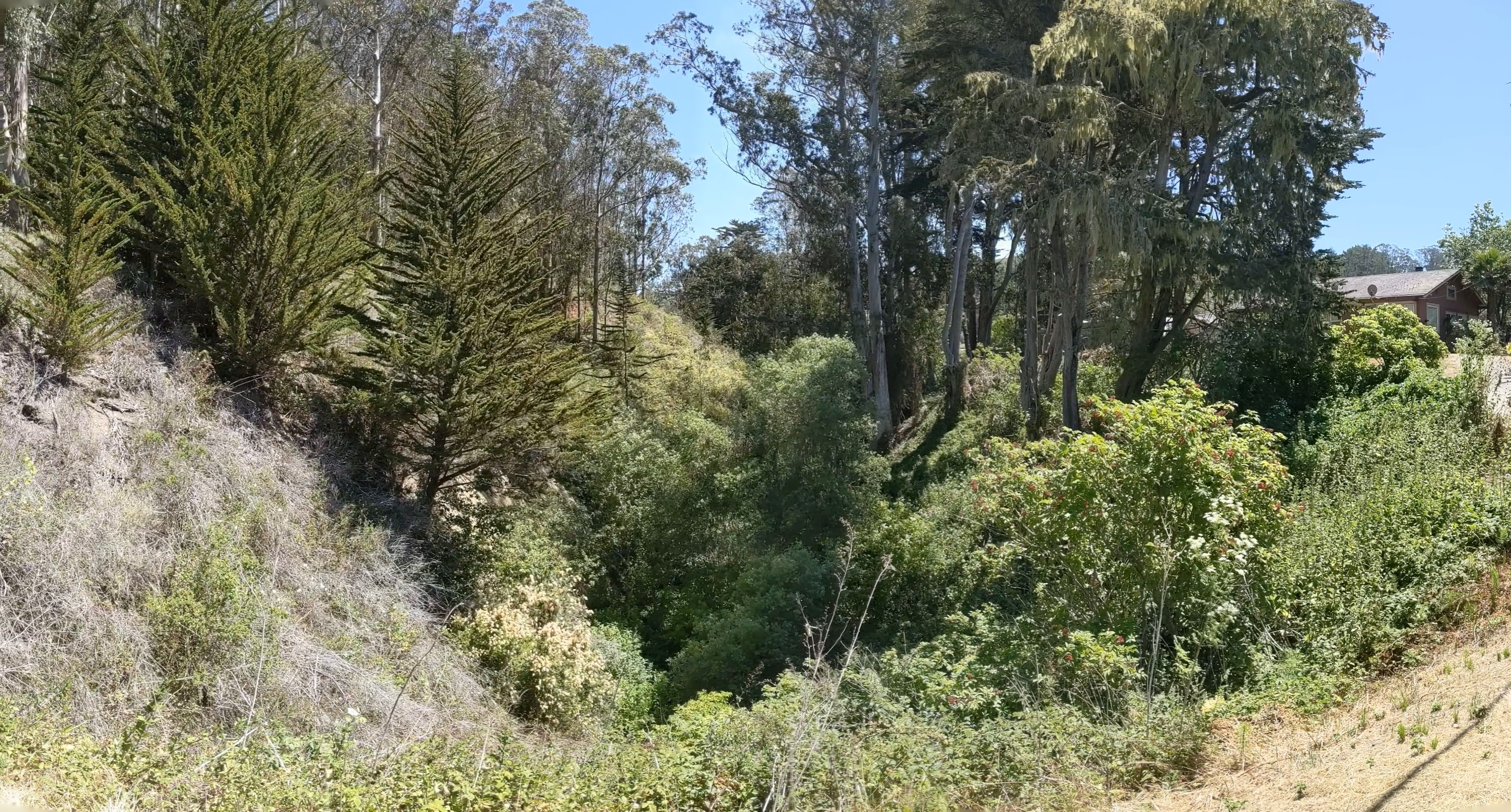
Lobitos Creek at Verde Road

Lobitos Creek is a stream in San Mateo County, California, United States.

== Tributaries ==
- Rogers Gulch
- Schoolhouse Creek

37.375776°N 122.409141°W

== See also ==
- List of watercourses in the San Francisco Bay Area
