= Purisima Creek (Santa Clara County) =

Purisima Creek Purissima Creek
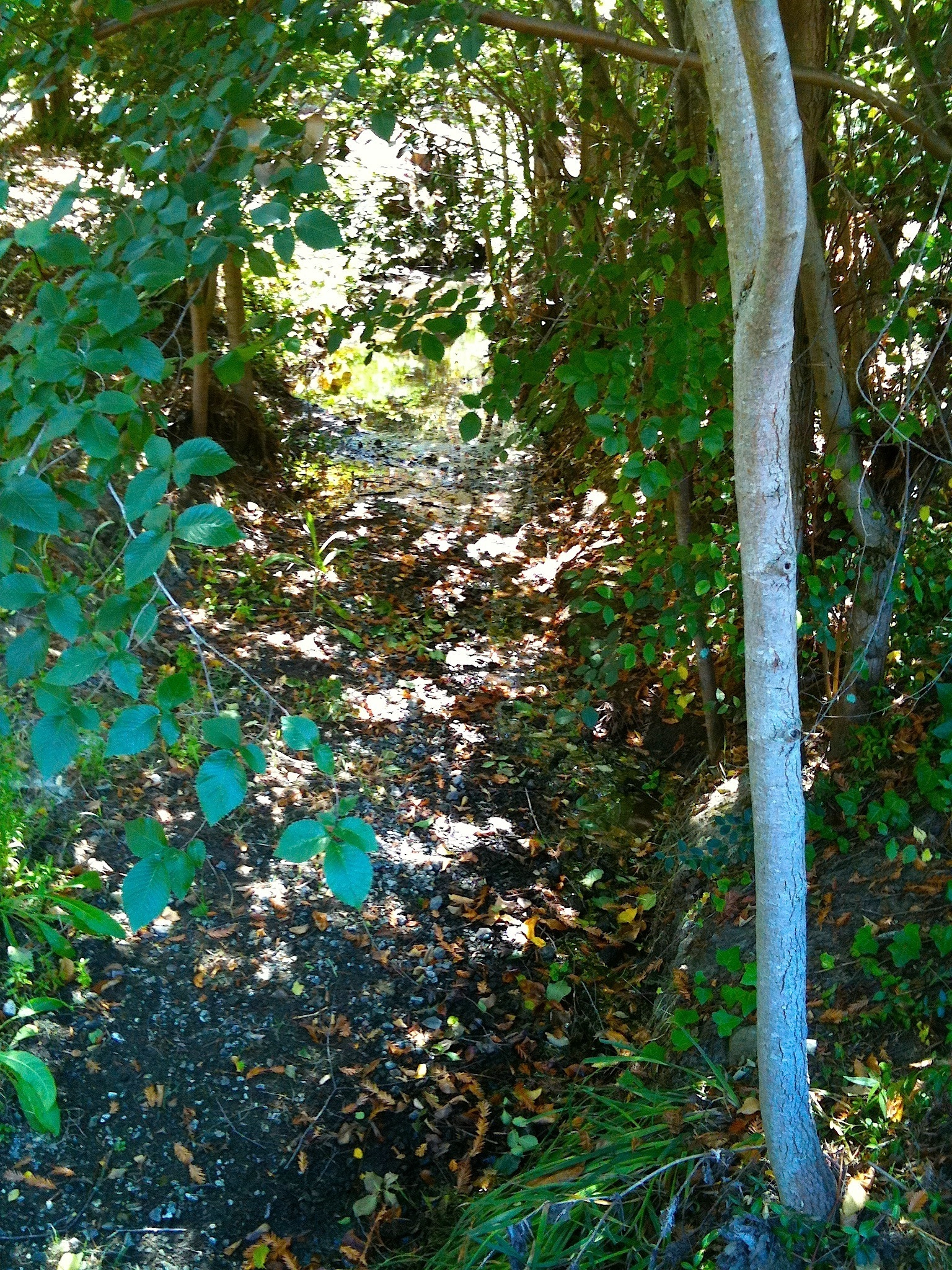
- Purisima Creek with water in late August (2010) just above O'Keefe Lane. Note invasive non-native Siberian Elm (Ulmus pumila).

Location
- Country: United States
- State: California
- Region: Santa Clara County
- Cities: Los Altos Hills, Los Altos

Physical characteristics
- Source
  - location: Los Altos Hills, California
  - coordinates: 37°21′38″N 122°08′56″W
  - elevation: 640 ft (200 m)
- Mouth: Confluence with Adobe Creek
  - location: Los Altos, California
  - coordinates: 37°22′04″N 122°07′04″W
  - elevation: 239 ft (73 m)

Purisima Creek is a 2-mile-long (3.2 km) eastward-flowing stream originating in Los Altos Hills in Santa Clara County, California, United States. It is a tributary of Adobe Creek which it joins just after entering Los Altos.

== History ==
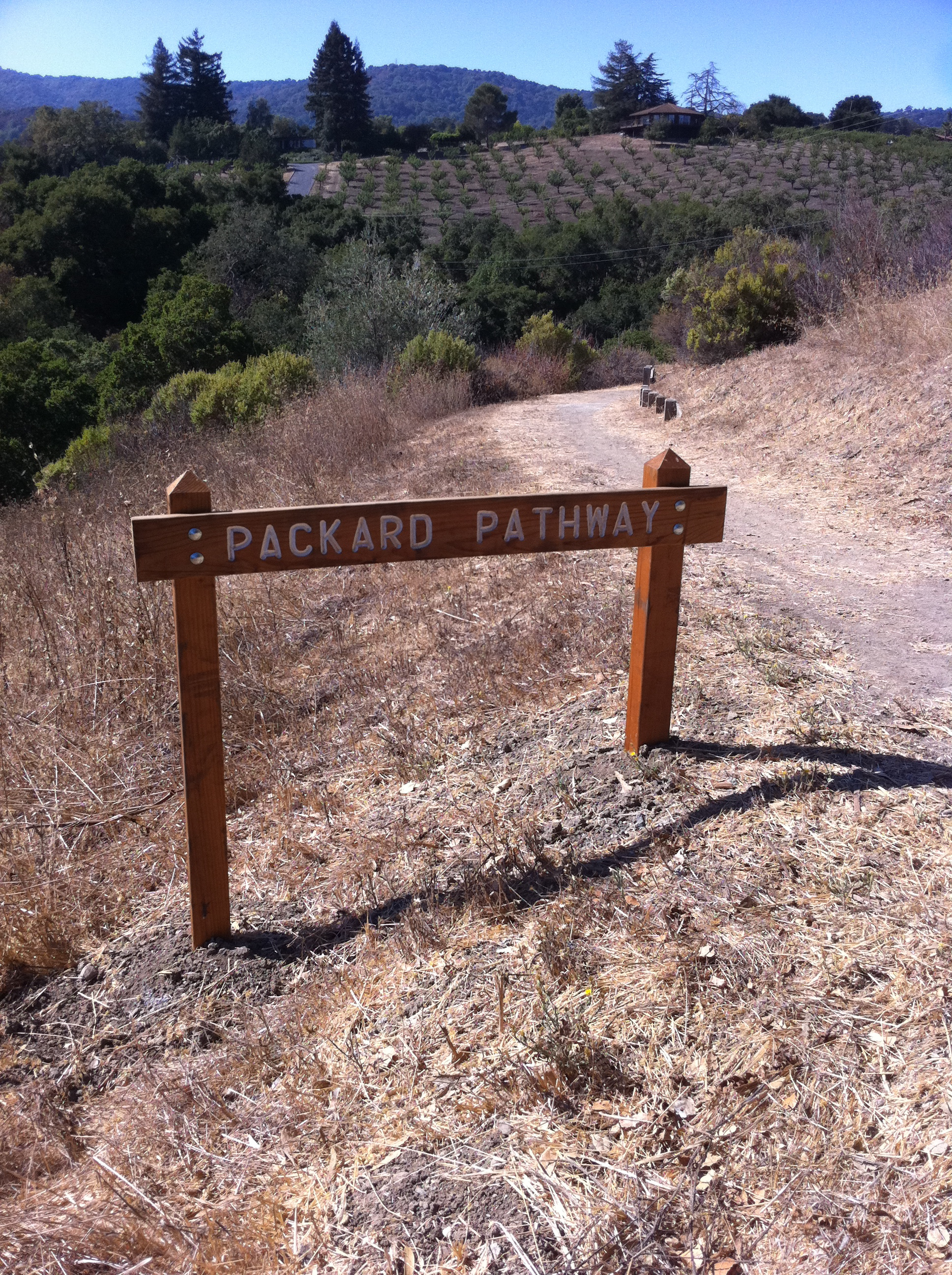
Packard Pathway descends from Taafe Road along Purisima Creek's north fork.

Purisima Creek runs through the historic Rancho La Purísima Concepción land grant, which was granted by Governor Alvarado in 1840 to Jose Gorgonio, an Indian living at Mission Santa Clara de Asís. In 1844 Gorgonio sold the one square league Rancho La Purísima Concepción to Juana Briones de Miranda (1804–1889), the daughter of Marcos Briones, who accompanied Junípero Serra in 1769. Gudde's "California Place Names" incorrectly asserted that there was no namesake for the land grant in Santa Clara County. Juana Briones sold about three quarters of her rancho in 1861 to Martin Murphy Jr. (1807–1884) of Sunnyvale, who had come to California with the Stephens-Townsend-Murphy Party in 1844.

One of the founders of Hewlett-Packard, David Packard, lived on the upper watershed of Purisima Creek on a property with a large apricot orchard. The orchard is now preserved by the town and the Packard Foundation.

== Watershed and course ==
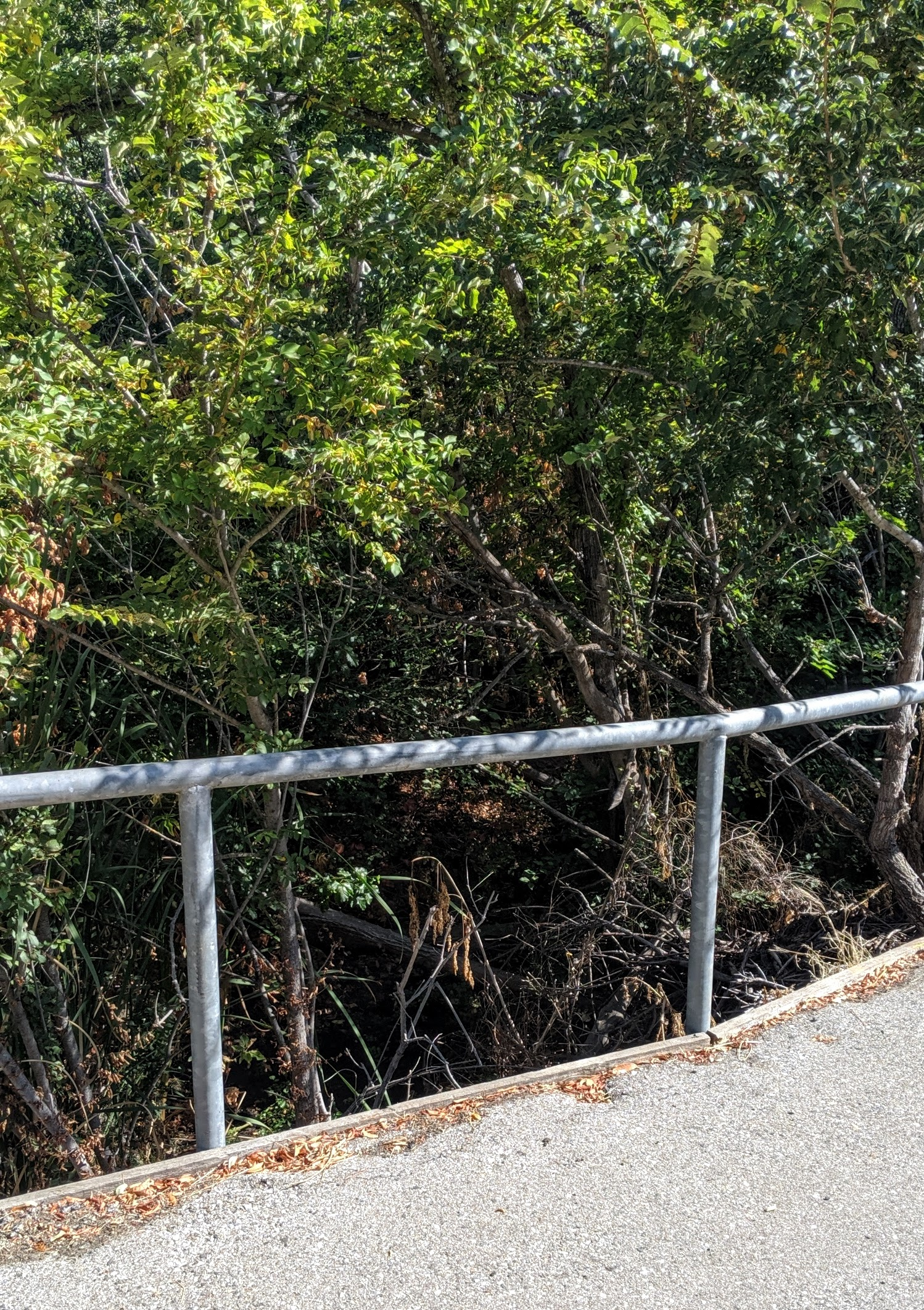
Purisima Creek entering Los Altos after passing under O'Keefe Lane, just above its confluence with Adobe Creek

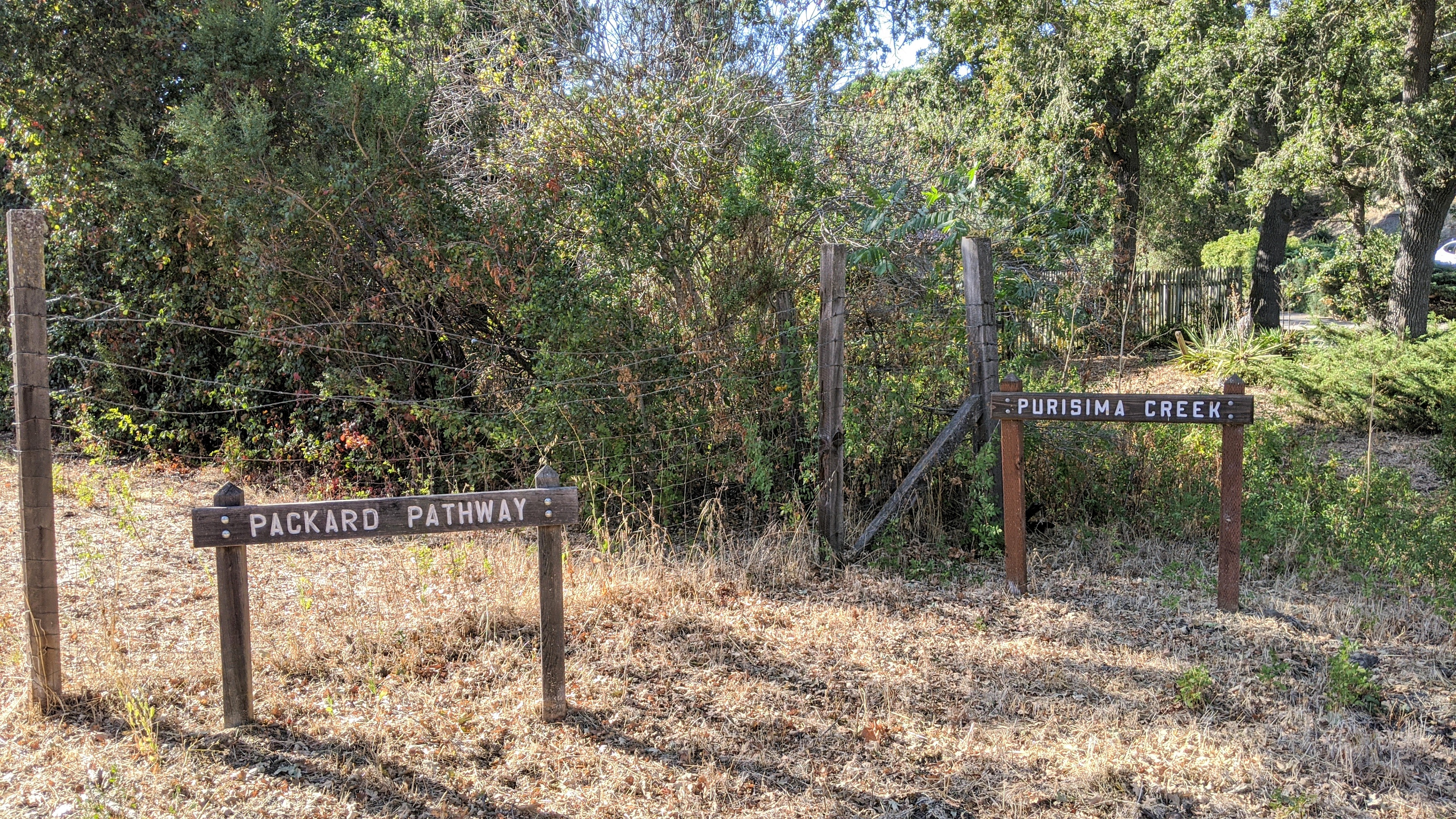
Purisima Creek at the bottom of the Packard Pathway at Elena Road, Los Altos Hills

Purisima Creek consists of two minor forks (a north and west fork) which embrace the apricot orchards now owned by the David and Lucile Packard Foundation. The creek's source is at the top of the west fork between Dezahara Way and Altamont Road. The "Packard Pathway" is a public walking and riding path that descends the north fork from its origin below the Packards' Taafe House on Taafe Road. At the base of the property the two forks come together to form the creek mainstem which levels out as it passes through the remains of an old walnut grove, then crosses Elena Road, flowing along Josefa Lane and the northwestern edge of Foothill College to where it passes under I-280, then along O'Keefe Lane and the O'Keefe Open Space Preserve to its confluence with Adobe Creek just inside Los Altos.

== Habitat and wildlife ==
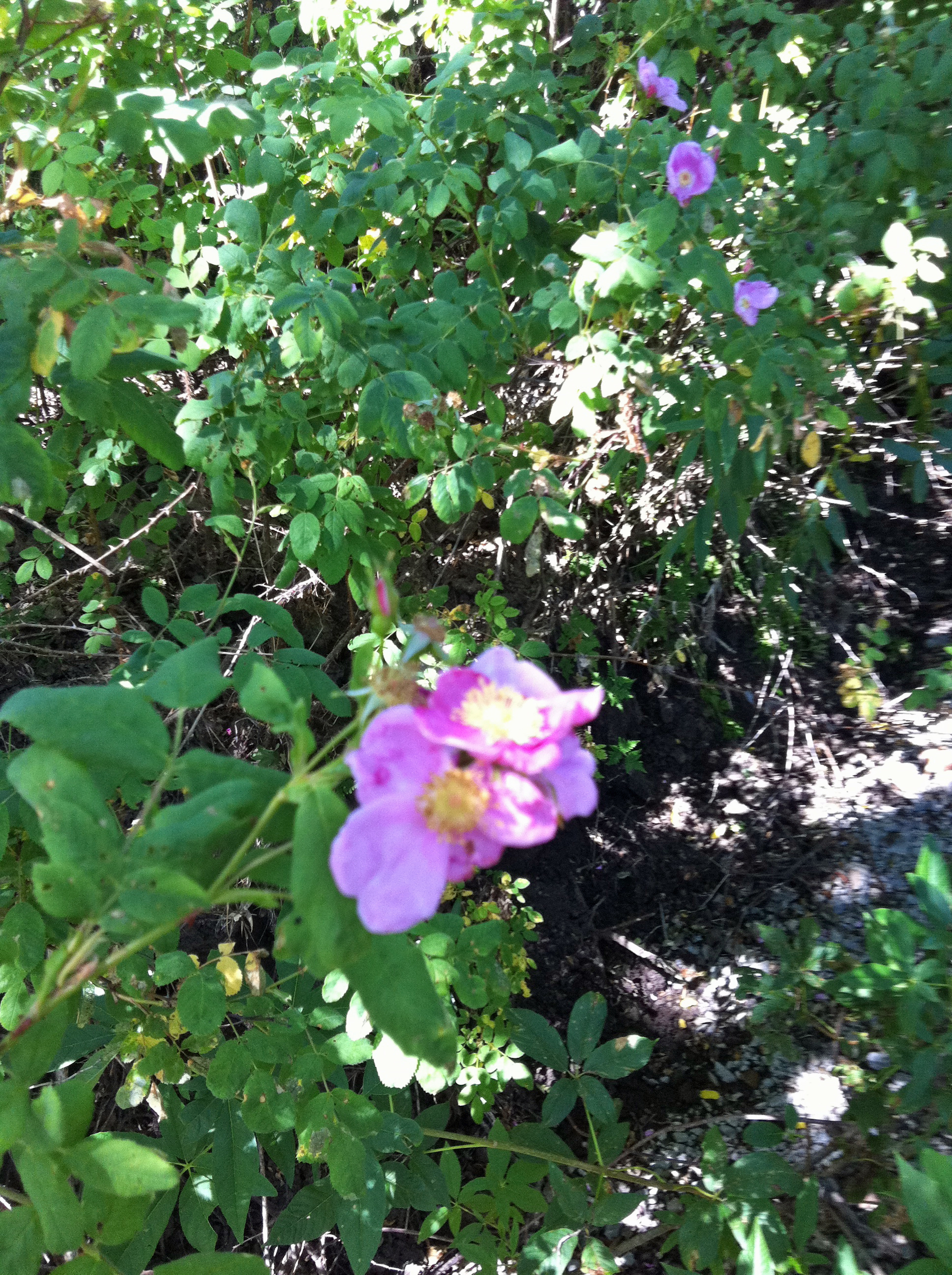
Native California Wild Rose (Rosa californica) on Purisima Creek just above Elena Road in Los Altos Hills, California.

There O'Keefe Open Space Preserve protects the riparian habitat along an 800-foot (240 m) section of the creek below I-280. It is an 8.2-acre (3.3 ha) nature preserve. This section of the creek has been invaded by non-native species that compete with the native vegetation for its water, including Canary Island palm (Phoenix canariensis), common fig (Ficus carica), plum (Prunus), blue gum eucalyptus (Eucalyptus globulus), European olive (Olea europaea), and Siberian elm (Ulmus pumila).

== See also ==
- List of watercourses in the San Francisco Bay Area
- Adobe Creek (near Los Altos, California)
- Foothill College
