= Long Gulch =

Valley in San Mateo County, California

Coordinates: 37.291333°N 122.406919°W

Long Gulch is a valley in San Mateo County, California.

== See also ==
- List of watercourses in the San Francisco Bay Area
