= Mount Diablo Creek =

Stream in California, US

Mount Diablo Creek Arroyo del Monte Diablo
- Location of mouth

Location
- Country: United States
- State: California
- Region: Contra Costa County

Physical characteristics
- Source: Northern flank of Mount Diablo
  - location: 3.4 mi (5 km) east/southeast of Clayton
  - coordinates: 37°55′05″N 121°52′37″W
  - elevation: 1,155 ft (352 m)
- Mouth: Seal Creek tidelands on southern shore of Suisun Bay
  - location: 5.2 mi (8 km) east of Martinez
  - coordinates: 38.029°N 122.035°W
  - elevation: 3 m (9.8 ft)
- Length: 14.3 mi (23.0 km)

Basin features
- Tributaries
  - left: Donner Creek, Mitchell Creek
  - right: Peacock Creek

Mount Diablo Creek is a 14.3-mile-long (23.0 km) northwest-flowing stream originating on the north flank of Mount Diablo. Its dozen small tributaries gather near Clayton before flowing through Concord and the Concord Naval Weapons Station, ultimately ending in tidelands on the southern shore of Suisun Bay in Contra Costa County. If the Concord Naval Weapons Station is converted to protected wildlands, Mount Diablo Creek may serve as the last wildlife corridor for black-tailed deer, tule elk, and other mammals from Mount Diablo to Suisun Bay.

== History ==
The name Monte del Diablo (Spanish for devil's grove) was recorded about 1824 for a Native American rancheria. It is reported that a fight between Spanish soldiers and Native Americans took place in 1806 by a thicket near the site of what is now Pacheco, and the soldiers believe a grotesquely dressed Native American medicine man was the devil. The creek's Spanish name was Arroyo del Monte Diablo. Americans later applied the name Mount Diablo to the peak, and the creek.

== Watershed and Course ==
Mount Diablo Creek is an intermittent stream that begins on the north flank of Mount Diablo, specifically the north flank of North Peak. It flows northwesterly, drawing from about a dozen tributaries that join it in or near Clayton. The Mount Diablo Creek watershed drains 56 square miles (150 km^{2}). Of its dozen tributaries, the larger are Donner Creek which joins from the left, then Peacock Creek which joins from the right, then Mitchell Creek which flows 4 miles (6.4 km) from the Eagle Peak to join Mount Diablo Creek from the left. The 12,800 acres (5,200 ha) Concord Naval Weapons Station encompasses the lower third of the watershed and is divided into the 7,630-acre Tidal Area and the 5,170-acre Inland Area. The City of Concord is developing a re-use plan for the Inland Area in partnership with the County and the East Bay Regional Park District (EBRPD), as the U.S. Navy transferred the Inland Area to the City of Concord in 2018. The mouth of Mount Diablo Creek is its confluence with Seal Creek in the tidal wetlands. Seal Creek joins Hastings Slough before entering Suisun Bay, an upstream component of greater San Francisco Bay.

The roughly dozen named tributaries of Mount Diablo Creek are Deer Flat Creek, Donner Creek (and its Back Creek subtributary), Goethels Canyon, Peacock Creek (and its Irish Creek subtributary), Mitchell Creek, Russelmann Creek, Seal Creek, Uncle Sam Canyon, and Wild Oat Canyon.

== Ecology and Conservation ==
Mount Diablo Creek and its Mitchell Creek tributary have hosted spawning runs of anadromous steelhead trout (Oncorhynchus mykiss) as evidenced by fish surveys over several decades. Although intermittent flows limit much of the creek for steelhead excepting a few perennial pools and short reaches, the creek is unusual as it has no fish passage barriers. Mitchell Creek also supports federally endangered California red-legged frog (Rana draytonii).

== See also ==
- Mount Diablo
- Suisun Bay
- List of watercourses in the San Francisco Bay Area
- List of rivers of California
