= House Creek (California) =

- Location of the mouth of House Creek in California

Location
- Country: United States
- State: California
- Region: Sonoma County

Physical characteristics
- Source: Welbridge Ridge
  - location: 14 mi (20 km) west of Healdsburg, California
  - coordinates: 38°39′11″N 123°6′37″W
  - elevation: 2,200 ft (670 m)
- Mouth: Wheatfield Fork Gualala River
  - location: 11 mi (18 km) north of Fort Ross, California
  - coordinates: 38°39′45″N 123°14′2″W
  - elevation: 322 ft (98 m)

Basin features
- Tributaries
  - left: Cedar Creek, Pepperwood Creek, Allen Creek
  - right: Britain Creek, Soda Spring Creek

House Creek is a 12.3-mile-long (19.8 km) stream in the mountains of western Sonoma County, California which empties into the Wheatfield Fork Gualala River.

== Course ==
The creek originates on Welbridge Ridge and descends initially to the west. Cedar Creek enters from the southeast, then Britain Creek from the north. It follows Sewell Road southward for about 0.5 miles (0.8 km) to where Pepperwood Creek enters from the east, then westward about 0.6 miles (1.0 km) to where Allen Creek enters from the southwest. It then flows generally northward. After Soda Spring Creek enters from the east, the creek crosses under Stewarts Point Skaggs Springs Road and empties into the Wheatfield Fork.

== Habitat and pollution ==
As of 2000, House Creek and most of its major tributaries supported steelhead trout. However, by 2002 the trout were so threatened that the National Oceanic and Atmospheric Administration took action against Hedgpeth Ranch operator James Soper for killing 34 juvenile fish by driving a tractor through the creek.

== Bridges ==
The Stewarts Point Skaggs Springs Road bridge was built in 1921 and widened to 34.5 feet (10.5 m) in 1976. By road it is 20.8 miles (33.5 km) east of State Route 1. It consists of three spans, each roughly 50 feet (15 m) long. Sonoma County bid out the seismic retrofitting of this structure in 2002.

== See also ==
- List of watercourses in the San Francisco Bay Area
