= Cañada Verde Creek =

River in California, United States

Coordinates: 37.429386°N 122.4399758°W

Cañada Verde Creek is a 2.5-mile-long (4.0 km) stream in San Mateo County, California.

== See also ==
- List of watercourses in the San Francisco Bay Area
