= Rockaway Beach, Pacifica, California =

Neighborhood

Coordinates: 37°36′36″N 122°29′51″W

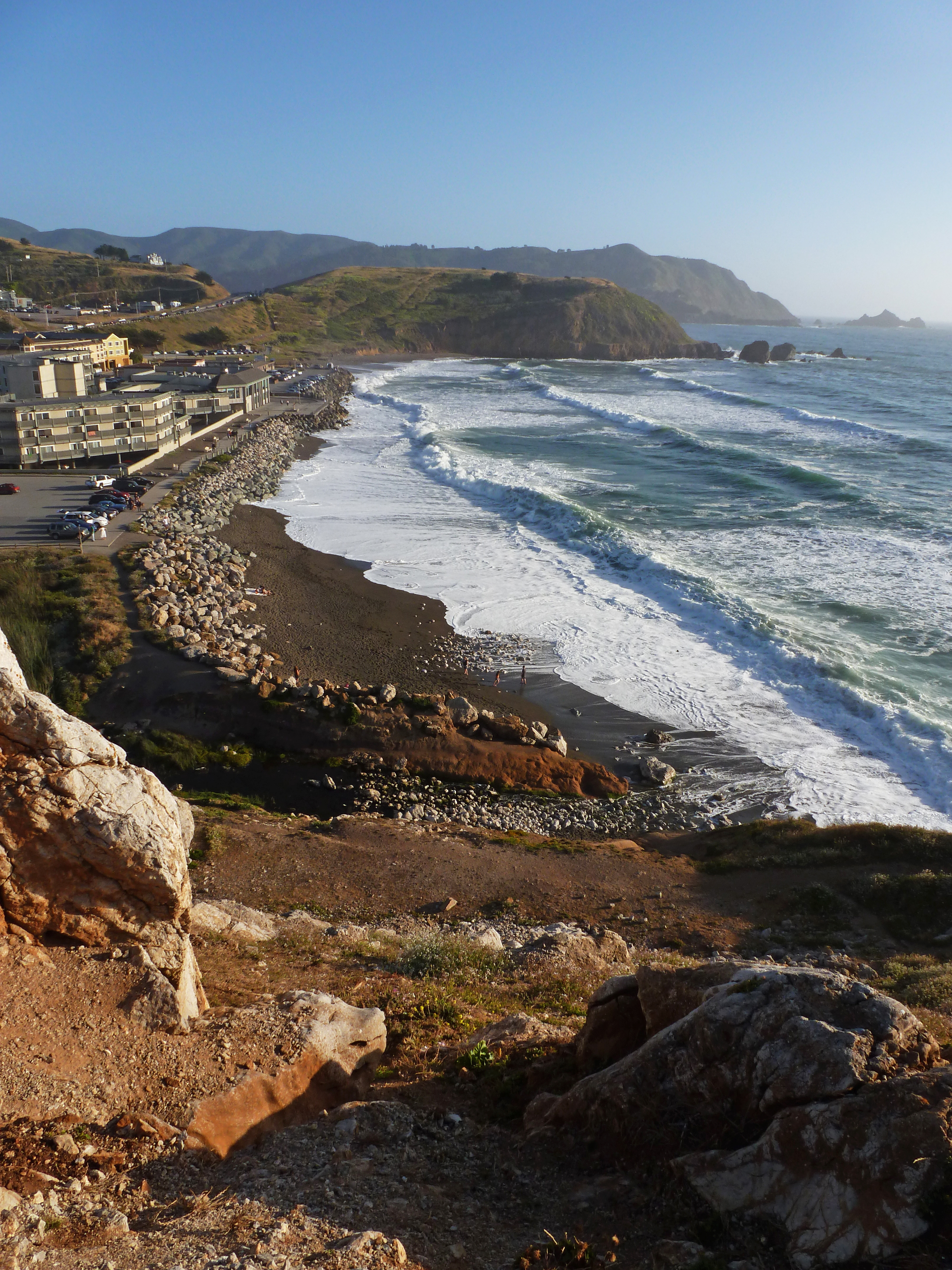
Rockaway Beach photographed from the north, at the quarry. Calera Creek is visible.

Rockaway Beach is a shoreline area of the Pacific Ocean in the southern portion of Pacifica, California, United States, approximately 7 miles (11 km) south of the city of San Francisco. It is located within a gently curving embayment with direct access via Rockaway Beach Avenue and providing easy access to Highway 1.

The beach itself is a popular place to visit with many restaurant and shopping venues although erosion has decreased its size over the years. It is noted for its scenic overlook, and is one of the cleanest beaches in the San Francisco Bay Area.

== History ==
There are no known prehistoric remains in Rockaway Beach itself; however, the site of the Ohlone Native American village site of Timigtac is located about a half mile away on Calera Creek, immediately to the east of Rockaway Beach by State Route 1.

The Rockaway beach area has played a role in local history since the arrival of the Portola Expedition, the Spanish explorers credited with discovery of the San Francisco Bay. As early as 1776, limestone quarried in the Rockaway Quarry lime pits was used to whitewash the newly built Presidio of San Francisco . More recent investigations suggest that early settlements in San Pedro Valley also used this limestone for their foundations. In 1907, the Rockaway Beach quarry was established as a continuously-operating commercial entity known as the Stone Brothers. After construction of the Ocean Shore Railroad in 1907, limestone from this quarry was conveyed to assist with the rebuilding of San Francisco after the 1906 San Francisco earthquake. Quarry materials were actually used as ballast for the trackbed of the railroad; moreover, after completion of the railroad, Rockaway Beach was considered a suburb of San Francisco due to convenient access. This all changed after legal problems resulting from landslide repair caused the railroad to go bankrupt in 1921.

Highway 1 was completed from Montara to Rockaway Beach in 1937, thereby reopening the local area again to easy northern access. Horace Hill operated the quarry from the early 1940s to 1953, along with a profitable sand dredging business on the quarry's backside. Ideal Cement took over the quarry operation after that time and owned it until 1971; later operators were Rhodes and Jamison and Quarry Products. The quarry ceased operation in 1987, and is currently (2019) being stabilized and restored.

In 2021, a memorial to those from Pacifica who died while serving in the United States armed forces in Vietnam, and Iraq, was erected at Pacifica's American Legion post.

== Natural features ==
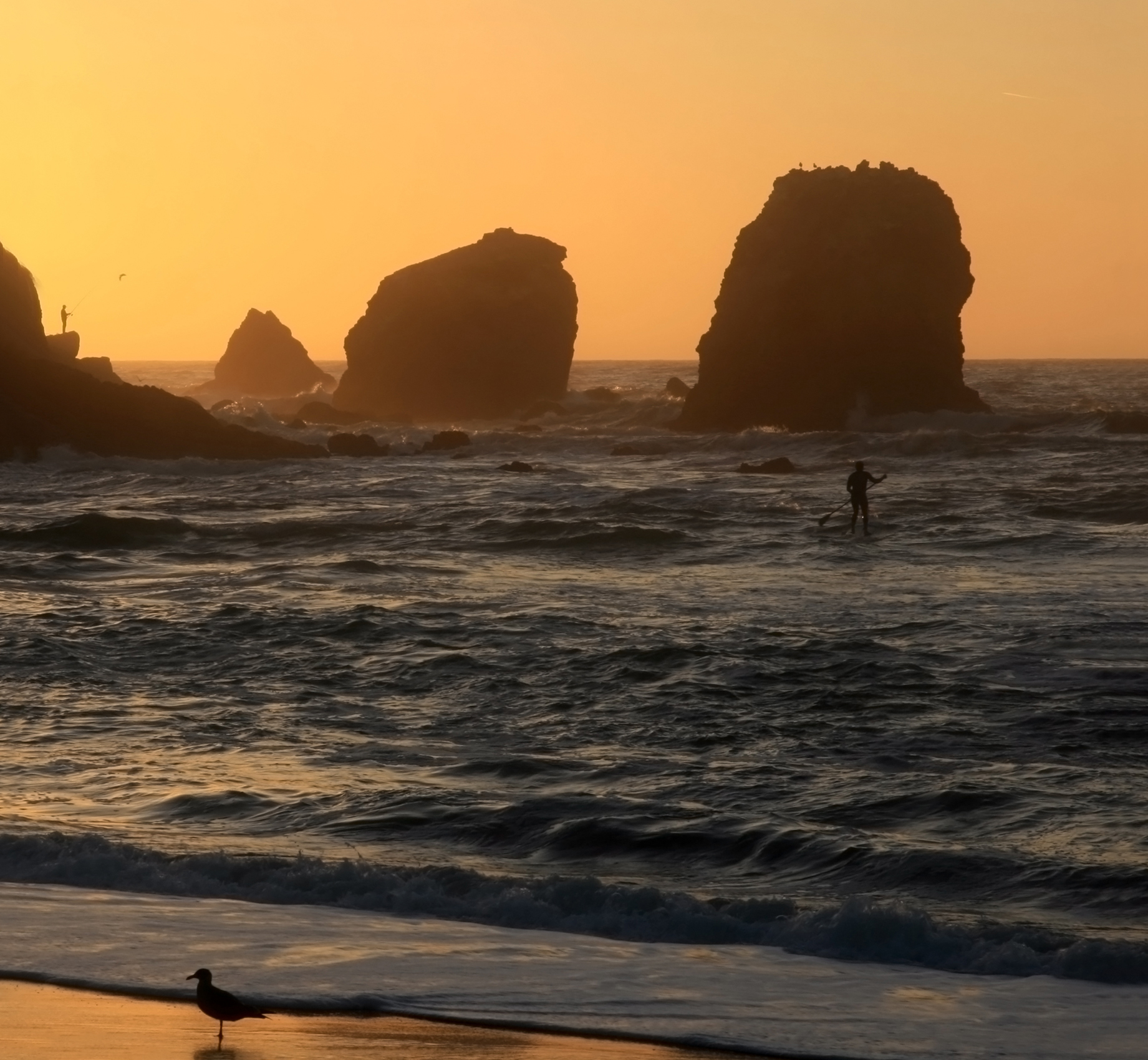
Sunset at Rockaway Beach

The coastal bluffs have verticality as steep as 60 percent, while some of the quarry surfaces are completely sheer. The limestone beds within the quarry are hard and fresh, with close- and widely-spaced fractures. Some of these beds are underlain by greenstone, an altered volcanic rock that becomes less weathered with depth. The eastern portion of the quarry area is underlain by alluvial terrace deposits. The beach littoral zone is underlain by Holocene age beach sand and the upper sands vary in depth by season, depending on the surf scouring of beach sands in the winter and the gradual rebuilding of sands in the summer.

The beach and headlands are mostly California coastal prairie and northern coastal scrub, while the riparian area of Calera Creek presents the most important upland habitat of the area. Although the beach and headlands area are the least disturbed natural areas of the Rockaway Beach area, they are used moderately as recreation spots. Vegetation is sparse on the beach with occurrences of succulent sea fig, Hottentot fig, and fat hen in the sandy areas. Farther away from the beach there are California poppies, sand verbena, and bush lupines. The near littoral elevation gradually increases toward the north until it reaches a headland peak of 175 feet.

Habitat on the headland east-facing slope consists of northern coastal scrub, considerable prostrate coyote brush, bush monkey flower, and colonies of bush lupine. A gamut of coastal wildflowers inhabit the headland slopes; in addition to California poppy, there are goldenasters, Douglas iris, and many other native species. The steep bluff faces host plants that are tolerant of wind and sea salt mist, such as silver beachweed, sea rocket, and extensive patches of yarrow.

North of the developed area of Rockaway Beach is a hidden quarry, whose habitat is severely disturbed. Rip-rap boulders protect the developed area from marine erosion. Near Calera creek there is aquatic vegetation including rushes, bulrushes, horsetail, fat hen, and plantain. The quarry area hosts a surprising number of amphibians, reptiles, small mammals, and a variety of birds. Avafauna sighted here include herons, egrets, California least terns, and red-winged blackbirds. The headland cliffs within the quarry provide nesting sites for bank swallows, pelagic cormorants, and Brandt's cormorants. Three endangered species are found proximate to Rockaway Beach: the San Francisco garter snake, the San Bruno elfin butterfly, and the California red-legged frog. These last two are found within the quarry property; the California red-legged frog is a critical food source for the San Francisco garter snake that is known to exist on the Mori Point National Park property immediately adjacent to the north.

== Developed area ==
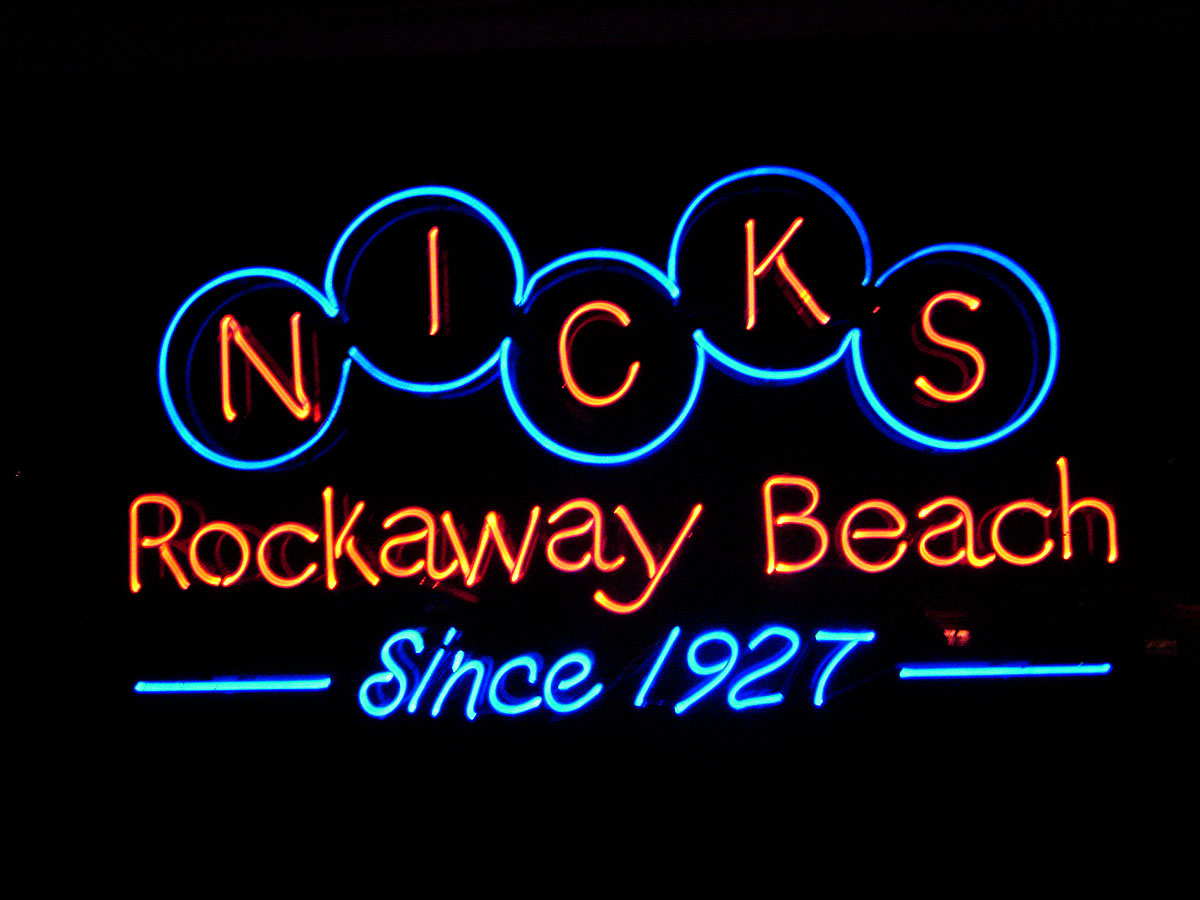

Hugging the coast at the center of Rockaway Beach is a cluster of restaurants and shops, the oldest of which is a Pacifica landmark, Nick's Seafood Restaurant. Another restaurant, historically the romantic Moonraker, hosts nighttime views over the illuminated waves of the Pacific crashing at the restaurant foundation bulwarks. Newer shops nestle behind the Moonraker, many a product of the city's 1986 redevelopment plan.

== See also ==
- List of beaches in California
- List of California state parks

== Bibliography ==
- Curtis Alling, Phyllis Potter, et al., Environmental Impact Report for the West Rockaway Beach Redevelopment Plan, prepared for City of Pacifica by Earth Metrics Inc., Burlingame, California, March, 1986
- General Plan, city of Pacifica (1980)
- Pacifica Quarry Reclamation Plan, Martin Carpenter Associates (1983)
- Phyllis M. Faber, Common Wetland Plants of Coastal California
- Geologic Map of Unconsolidated and Moderately Consolidated Deposits of San Mateo County, California, U.S. Geological Survey, Field Studies Map MF-575 (1974)
