= Calera Creek =

Stream in Pacifica, California, US

Coordinates: 37°36′39″N 122°29′50″W

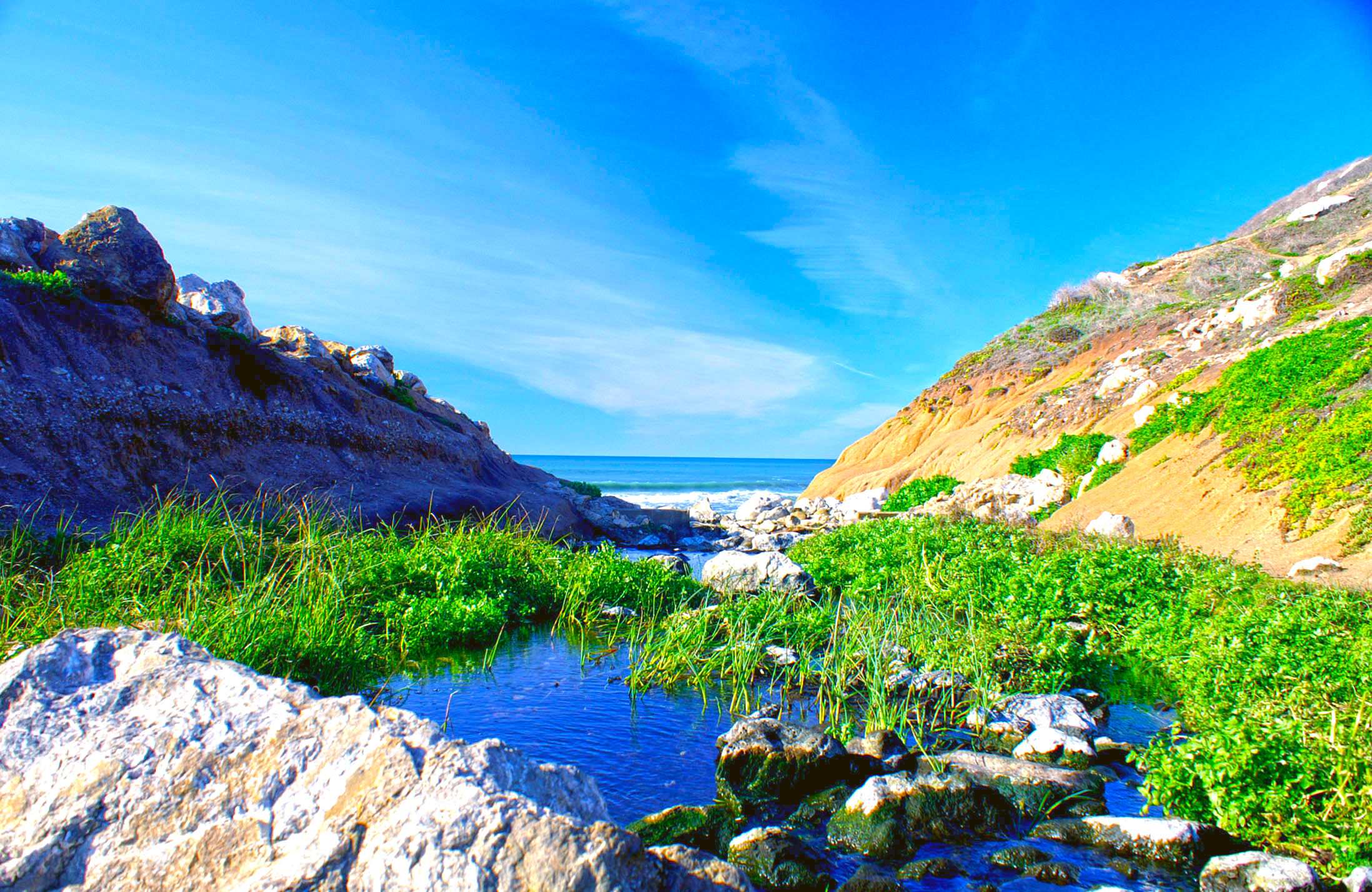
Calera Creek outlet, Pacifica, California

Calera Creek (Pacifica, California) is a stream in the Rockaway Beach and Vallemar neighborhoods of Pacifica, California. The creek is named for the limestone deposits and historical Rockaway Quarry located nearby. With headwaters in the Sweeney Ridge national park, this creek presently enjoys wetlands restoration from the Calera Creek Water Recycling Plant, and contains habitat for the California red-legged frog and San Francisco garter snake.

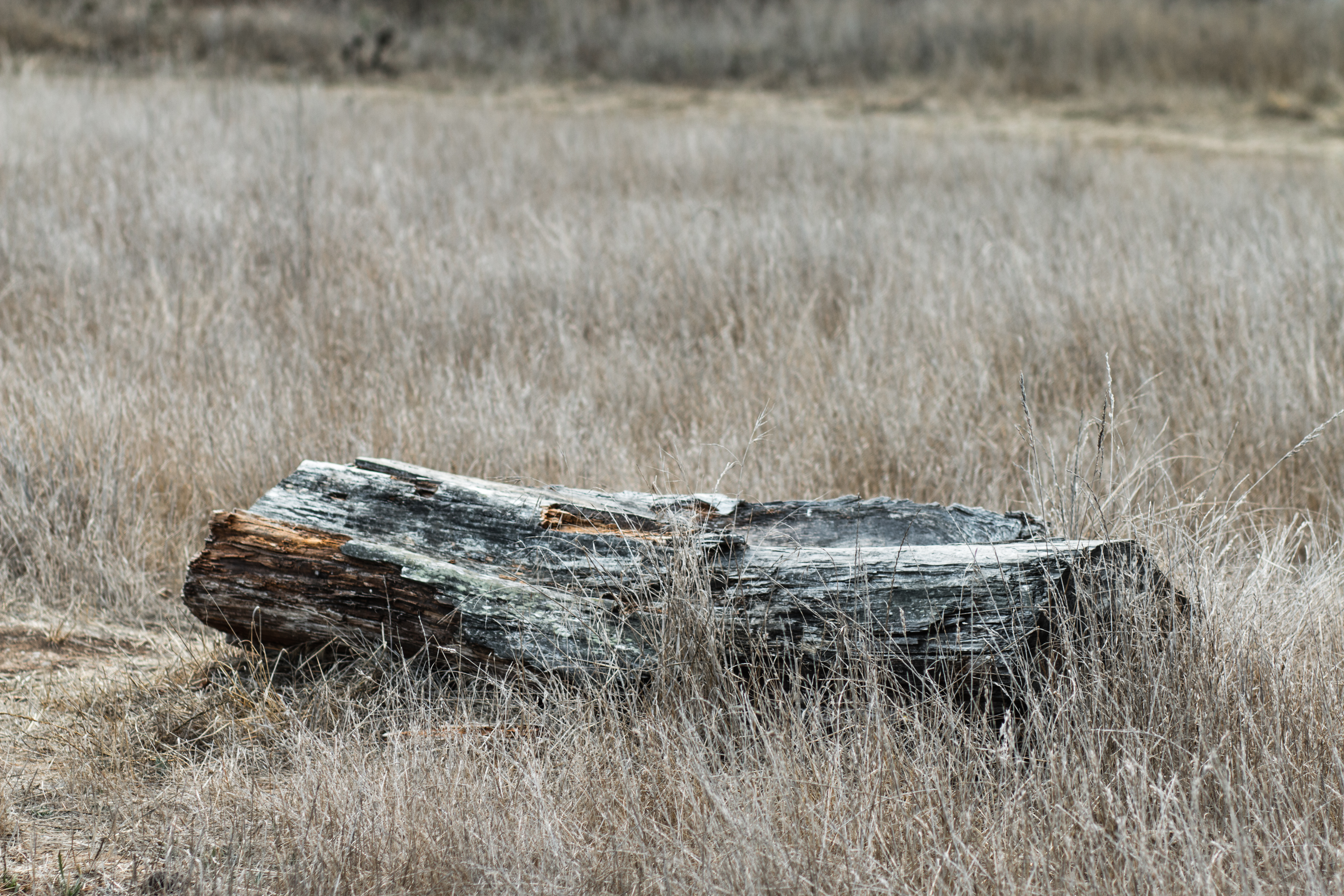
Log, Calera Creek Wetlands, Pacifica

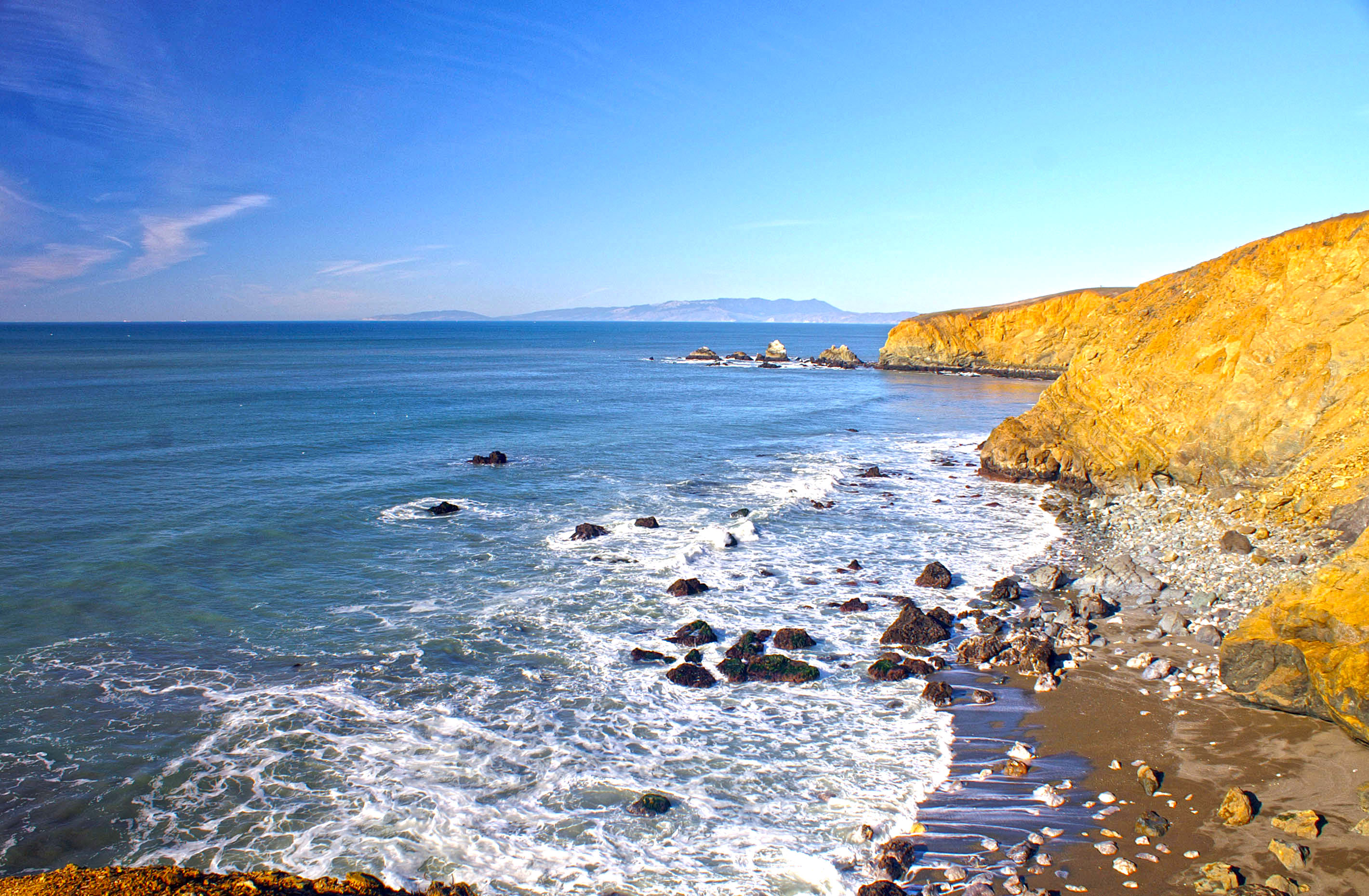
Coastline near Calera Creek

== See also ==
- List of watercourses in the San Francisco Bay Area
