= Arroyo Dolores =

Coordinates: 37.76264°N 122.41671°W

Location
- Country: United States
- State: California
- City: San Francisco

Physical characteristics
- Mouth
  - location: China Basin

Arroyo Dolores (Spanish for Our Lady of Sorrow Creek) is a river in San Francisco, California that has been largely culverted. The only remaining portion above ground is in the Mission Creek Channel that drains into China Basin.
