= Lafayette Creek (California) =

Stream in Contra Costa County

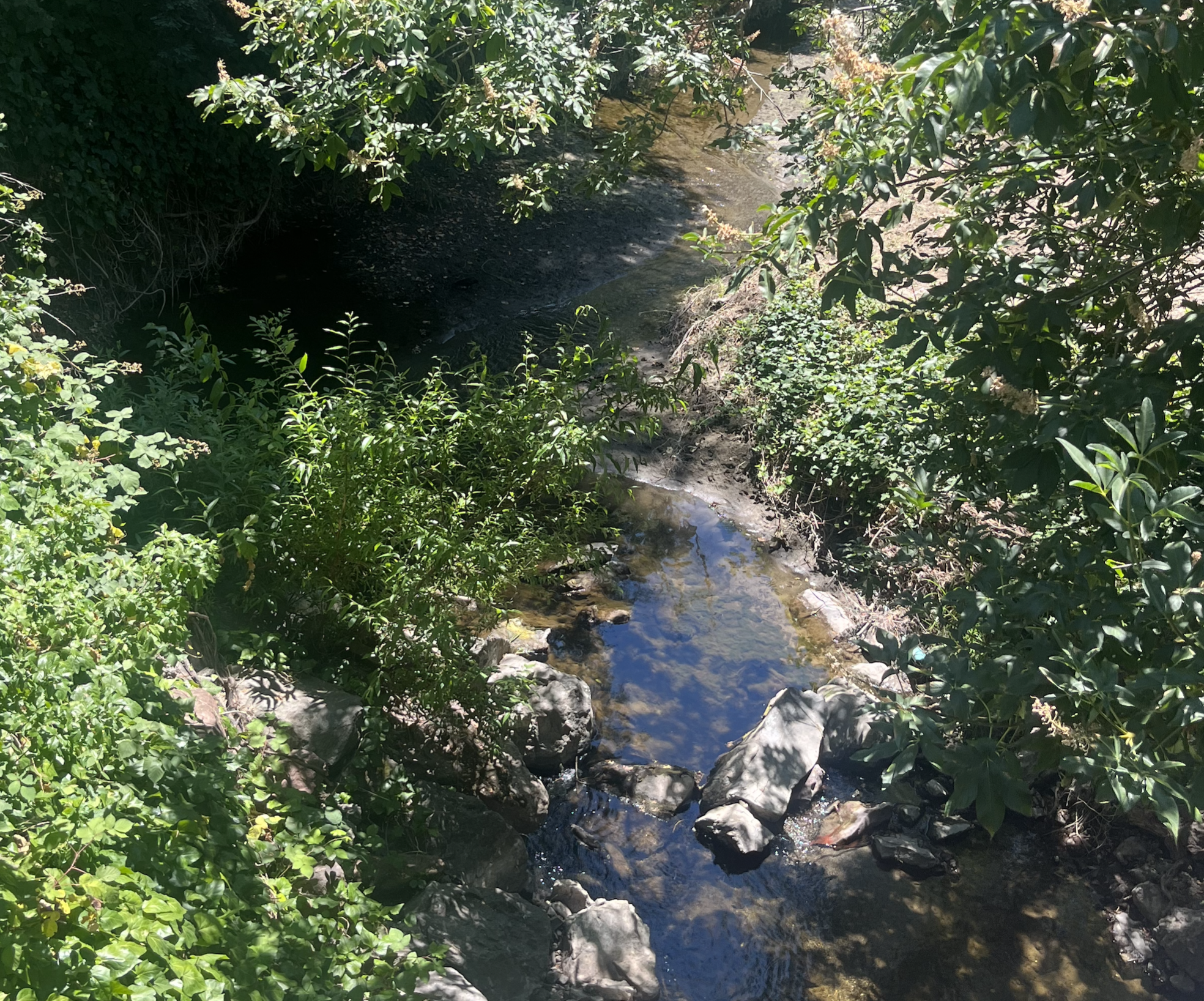

- Location of Lafayette Creek's mouth

Location
- Country: United States
- State: California
- County: Contra Costa County
- City: Lafayette

Physical characteristics
- Mouth: Las Trampas Creek
  - location: Lafayette, California
  - coordinates: 37°53′33″N 122°06′41″W
- Length: 3.78 m (12.4 ft)

Basin features
- Basin Climate: Mediterranean Climate

Lafayette Creek is a 3.78 miles (6.08 km) long creek in Contra Costa County, California in the San Francisco Bay Area. It is a tributary of Las Trampas Creek.

== Course ==
Lafayette Creek begins as a number of small streams in the Briones hills at an elevation of 1,483 feet (452 m) above sea level, to the north of the city of Lafayette, California. The creek also receives flow from the Lafayette Reservoir. Though many of its upper tributaries are intermittent, Lafayette Creek has perennial flow due to input from urban runoff.

It flows generally east passing through Downtown Lafayette. Lafayette Creek is urbanized through much of its course in the town, in some places its channel has been lined with concrete as a flood control measure.

== Geography ==
Lafayette Creek is located in Contra Costa County, California, in the San Francisco Bay Area. Its watershed is home to approximately 25,000 people and is dominated by the town of Lafayette, California, which is built out along its banks.

Lafayette Creek is a tributary of Las Trampas Creek, which drains into Walnut Creek which in turn drains into the Suisun Bay through a series of wetlands.

== History ==
Before European colonization of the Bay Area by the Spanish in the 18th century, the watershed of Lafayette Creek was inhabited by groups of the Saclan Bay Miwok people. Anthropologist Sherburne F. Cook's famous 1957 map, Aboriginal Population of Alameda and Contra Costa Counties, shows a particularly dense population along Lafayette Creek and its tributaries in the present community of Happy Valley. Lafayette Creek as with all water sources in California, was an incredibly important and sacred entity to the Saclan. By 1800, the Saclans had been placed into "a condition of great disorganization" by the numerous incursions of the Spanish Military into their territory throughout the late 1700s, and by 1804, there is no mention of them in official correspondences.

As a result of habitat loss, disease and direct conflict with colonial authorities, the traditional Saclan tribal system that had existed in the region for at least 1,000 years was all but gone from the area by the early 19th century. The map was compiled well over 100 years after the landscape inhabited by the Saclans had been transformed by Euro-American agricultural and economic systems; It is likely that there were more habitation sites in the Lafayette Creek basin than is displayed, as conspicuous evidence is often hard to come by.

In 1847, Elam Brown led a wagon train from Missouri to Alta California and in doing so, became one of a small subset of American settlers living in pre-gold rush Mexican California. After cutting redwood timber in the East Bay Redwoods for a season, he purchased the 3,329 acre Rancho Acalanes from noted real-estate speculator and politician, William Leidesdorff of Oakland, California, which included nearly the entirety of the Lafayatte Creek watershed. Brown would erect his house along Lafayette Creek on a former native village in what is now La Fiesta Square, in downtown Lafayette, California. The waters of the creek were used to power a gristmill constructed by Brown.

Over time, Elam Brown subdivided and sold parts of his rancho to newly arrived American settlers. After the beginning of the gold rush in 1848, the fertile valleys of the Bay Area began to be settled much more intensively, and soon the banks of Lafayette Creek were filling with houses and farms, drastically changing the ecology and structure of the creek. The oak savanna that covered the valley bottom was cleared to make way for wheat fields, and later orchards, though the trees immediately on the banks of the creek were mostly spared. Artesian wells, fed by Lafayette Creek were utilized in the later part of the 19th and early 20th centuries, which lowered the water table in the watershed and contributed to stream channel erosion.

Rapid suburbanization during the post–World War II housing boom, particularly in the 1950s, further contributed to habitat degradation in the Lafayette Creek catchment. Houses were constructed right up to the banks of the creek, causing concerns in modern times over erosion and flooding.

== Ecology ==
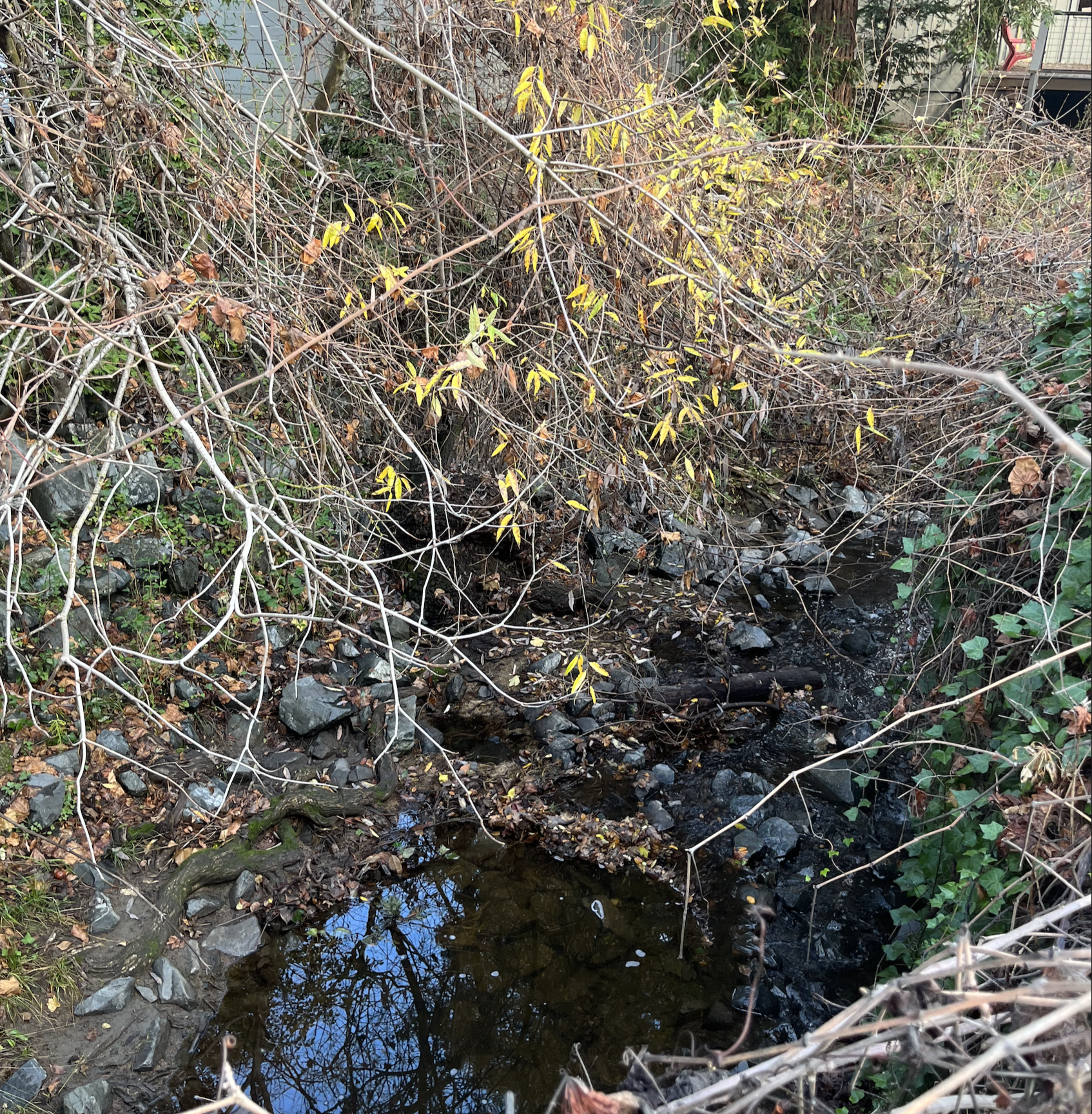
Lafayette Creek is heavily urbanized as it passes through Lafayette, California. Arroyo Willow and California grapevine are present alongside invasive English ivy (December 28th, 2023)

Lafayette Creek has been heavily altered from its natural state as a result of agricultural and later urban development in its watershed. To control erosion and mitigate flooding, city planners in the 20th century implemented a number of concrete flood control structures and channel alignments. The subsequent modification of streamside habitat drastically changed the ecological structure of the creek. For example, invasive species like arundo donax have established themselves in the creek and reduce the biodiversity of the local ecosystem by outcompeting native species.

Despite alterations to its habitat, Lafayette Creek retains many of the tree species native to the San Francisco Bay Area along its banks, including Coast Live Oak, Valley oak, California buckeye, California bay, Fremont cottonwood and White alder. Some specimens of oak trees along the creek are very old. California Grape, California mugwort and a variety of other plants common in the region are present along Lafayette Creek. Additionally, it is an important corridor for local wildlife travelling between less-developed areas.

A lack of permeable surfaces in the Lafayette Creek watershed, caused by the laying of concrete and asphalt for roads, parking lots and buildings, has increased the amount of storm runoff in Lafayatte Creek, causing downcutting. In a natural setting, more rainwater would be absorbed by the land and would remain in the landscape for a longer period of time, fueling plant growth and providing more consistent water supplies throughout the dry summer season.

=== Rainbow Trout Population ===
Like many Central California streams, Lafayette Creek hosted a population of anadromous Coastal rainbow trout until the rapid suburbanization of Contra Costa County in the second half of the 20th century. Isolated sightings of trout occurred in Lafayette Creek through the early 2000s, though some of these fish were thought to have originated in the Lafayette Reservoir during a flood event.

== See also ==
- California Coast Ranges
