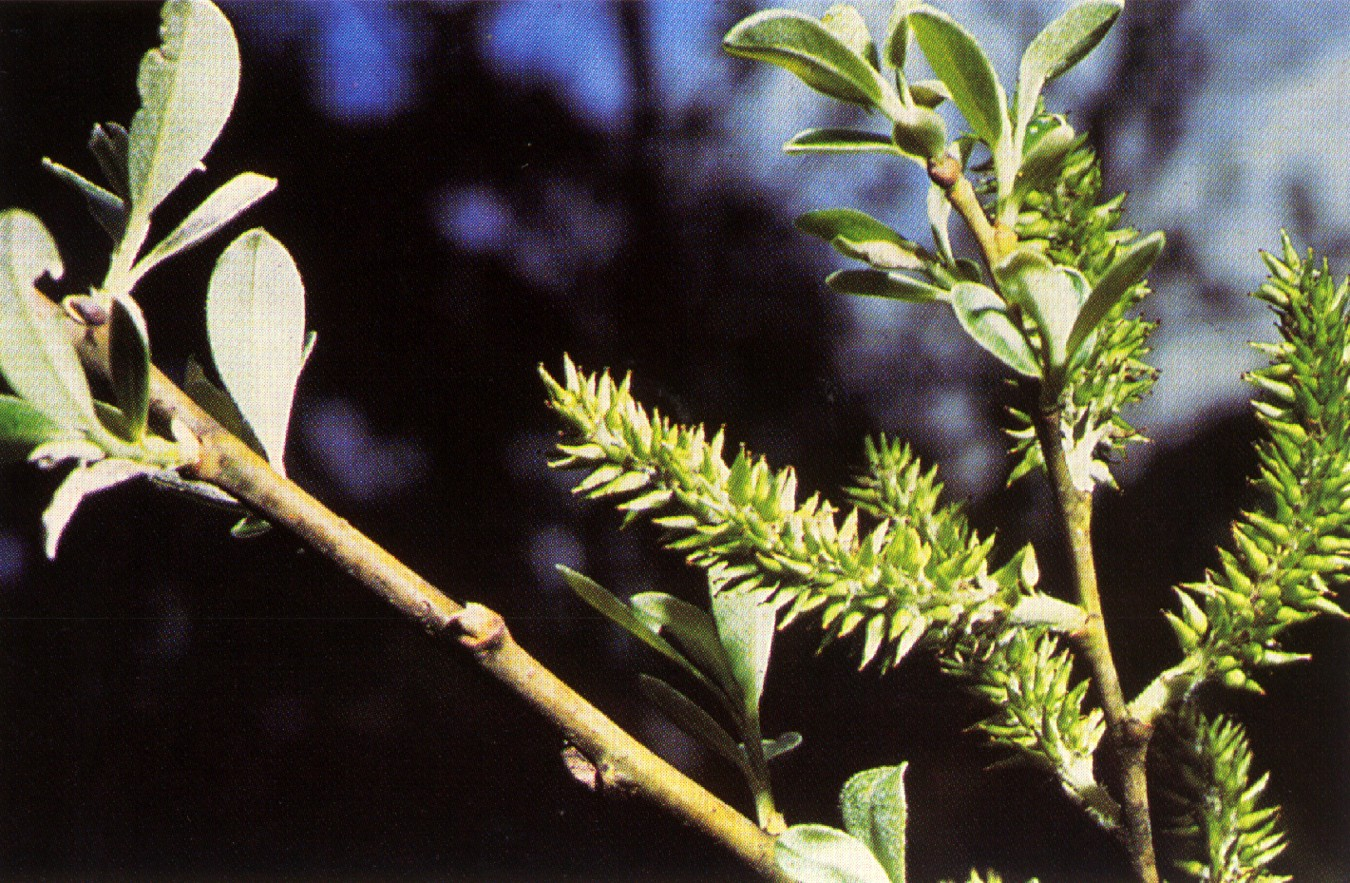

Conservation status
- Secure (NatureServe)

- Least Concern (IUCN 3.1)

Scientific classification
- Kingdom: Plantae
- Clade: Embryophytes
- Clade: Tracheophytes
- Clade: Spermatophytes
- Clade: Angiosperms
- Clade: Eudicots
- Clade: Rosids
- Order: Malpighiales
- Family: Salicaceae
- Genus: Salix
- Species: S. lasiolepis

Binomial name
- Salix lasiolepis Benth.
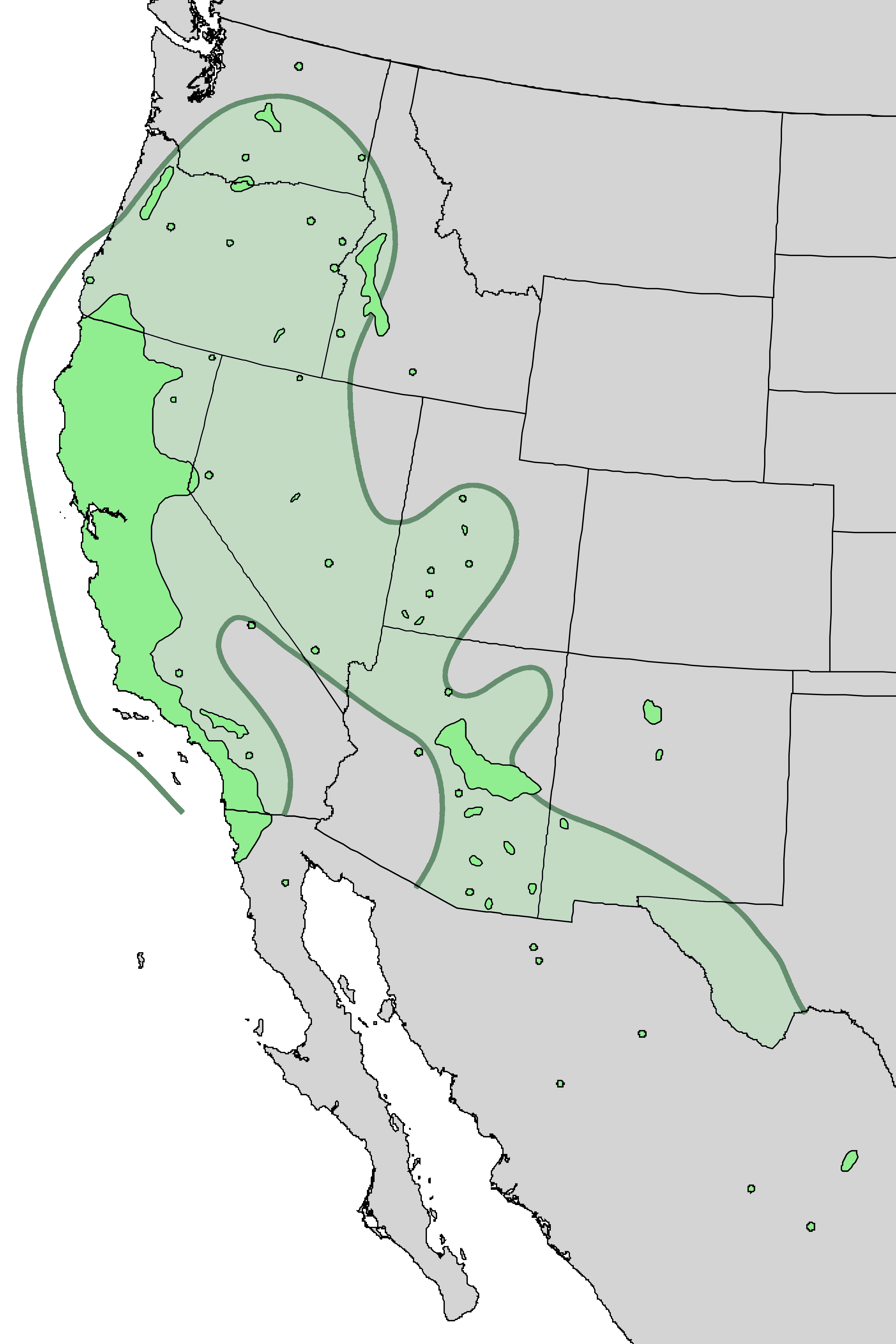
- Natural range

= Salix lasiolepis =

Arroyo willow

Species of willow

Salix lasiolepis (arroyo willow) is a species of willow native to western North America.

== Distribution ==
The core range of the arroyo willow includes most of California, including the California Coast Ranges, Arizona, Klamath Mountains, Peninsular Ranges, Sierra Nevada, and Transverse Ranges. It extends north into Washington, south into Baja California, and east into Idaho, Utah, Texas, and Coahuila (México).

=== Habitat ===
The plant is commonly found growing in riparian zones in canyons and valleys, along pond shores, and in marshes and wetlands. It is found in many plant communities, including: chaparral, oak woodland, mixed evergreen forest, coast redwood forest, yellow pine forest, red fir forest, lodgepole pine forest, and grasslands.

== Allergenicity ==
Salix lasiolepis is a severe allergen.

== Pollination ==
Occurs in following seasons depending on latitude and elevation: Spring.

It is primarily pollinated through insects.

== Description ==
Salix lasiolepis is a deciduous large shrub or small multi−trunked tree growing to 10 metres (33 ft) tall. The shoots are yellowish brown and densely hairy when young. The leaves are 3.5–12.5 centimetres (1.4–4.9 in) long and broadly lanceolate in shape. They are green above and glaucous green below. The undersides are covered with whitish or rusty hairs which gradually wear off during the summer.

The morphology of its leaves is varied; at maturity its leaf margins can be revolute, entire, or serrate. Its apices can be acute to obtuse. The stipules of S. lasiolepis can appear absent or leaf-like, and its petioles are hairy.

The flowers are unisexual. Male (staminate) flowers feature yellow catkins 1.7–5.5 centimetres (0.67–2.17 in) long, and female (pistillate) flowers have green catkins 1.5–6 centimetres (0.59–2.36 in) long. Both are produced in early spring. The bloom period is February to May. Precocious inflorescence has been observed in the species, meaning that the flowers develop before the leaves.

=== Varieties ===
- Salix lasiolepis var. bigelovii — Bigelow's willow, endemic to California and Oregon. Currently reclassified as species Salix lasiolepis.
- Salix lasiolepis var. lasiolepis — Tracy Willow, endemic to narrow Pacific coastal zone in NW California and SW Oregon. Currently reclassified as species Salix lasiolepis.

== Ecology ==
S. lasiolepis serves as a host plant for various insects, including Lorquin's admiral, mourning cloak, and western tiger swallowtail butterflies.

Its seeds are tiny, measuring approximately 1 millimetre (0.039 in) and are distributed by wind.

== Uses ==
The indigenous peoples of California used the species in various ways. As a traditional medicinal plant, infusions of the leaves, bark, or flowers were used for several disease remedies. The bark has been used to make tea to help with pains and fevers.

The inner bark was used to make rope. Shoots were used in coiled and twined basketry, and branches were used to make acorn storage baskets. The leaves were used to thatch ramadas.

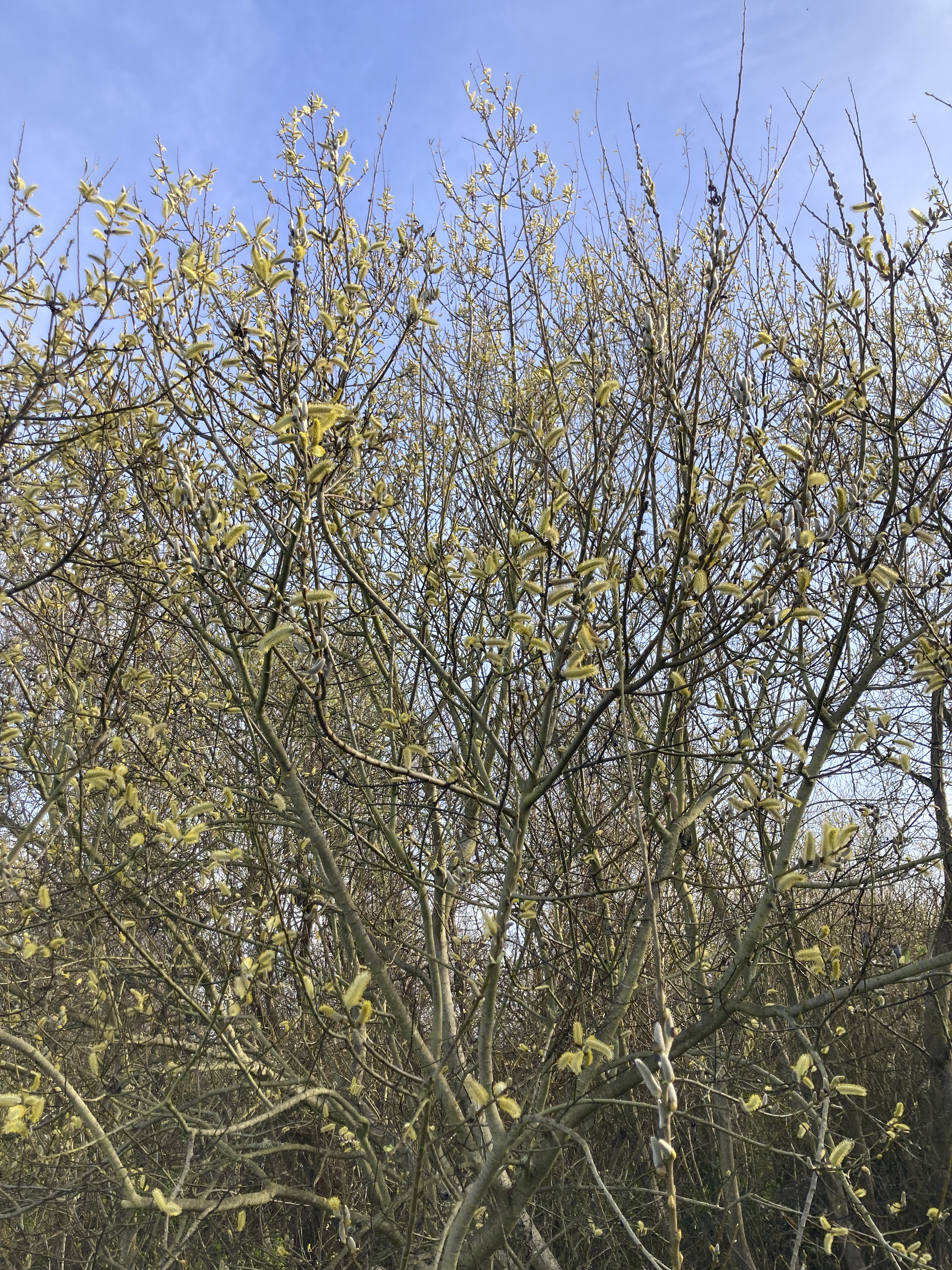
Flowers were used by indigenous peoples

== Gallery ==
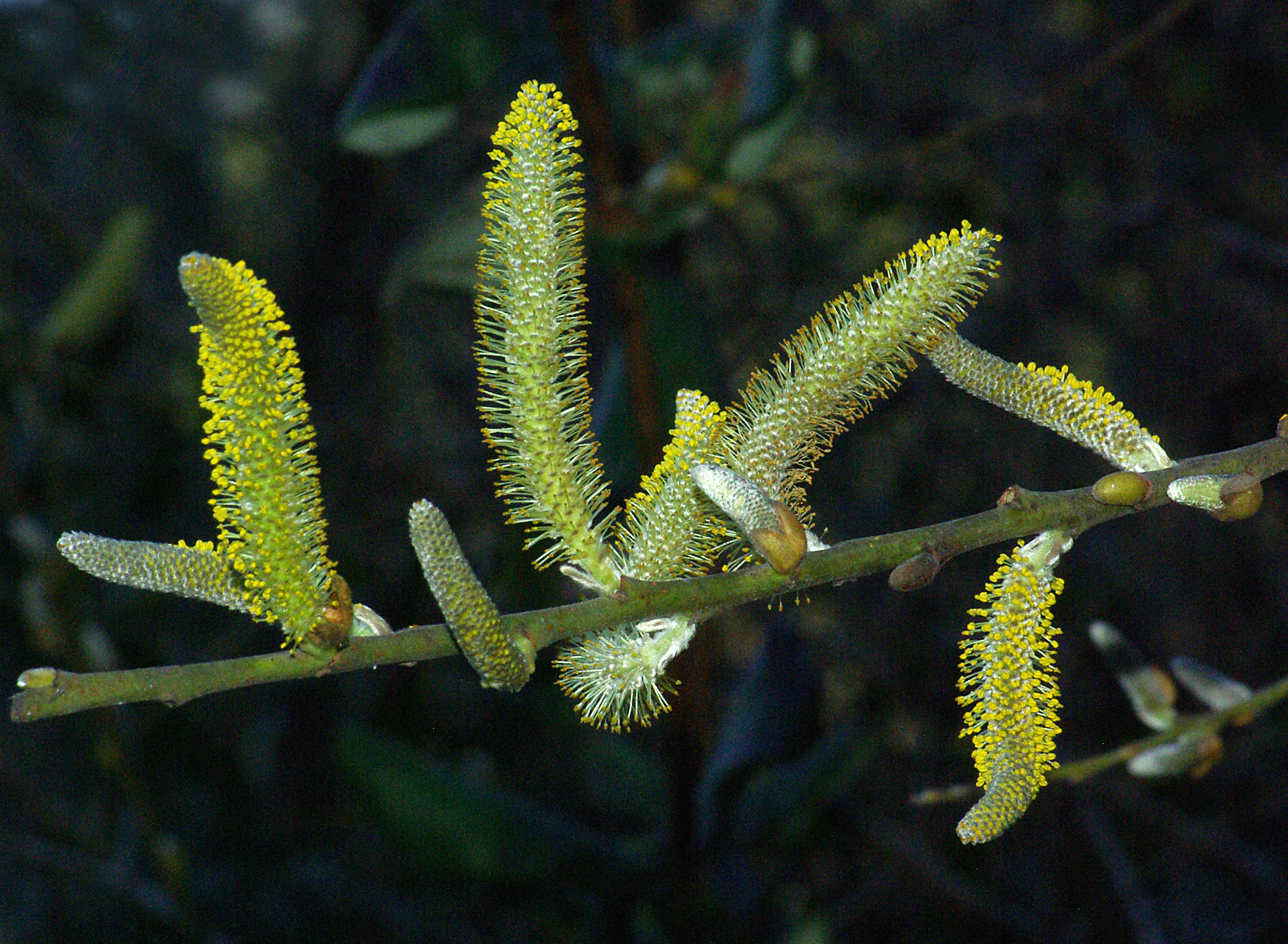
Detail of the catkins

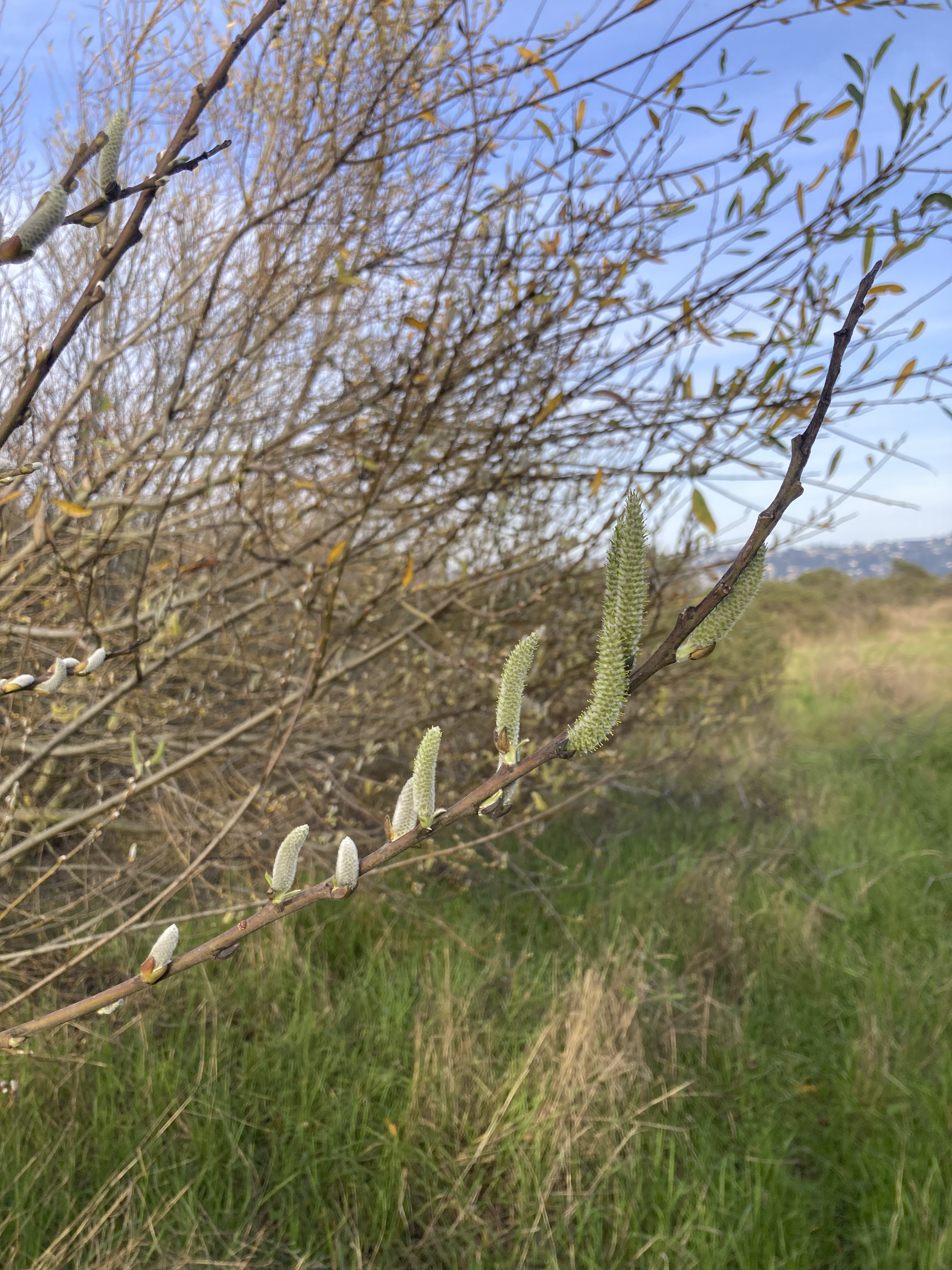
The catkins at various stages of growth

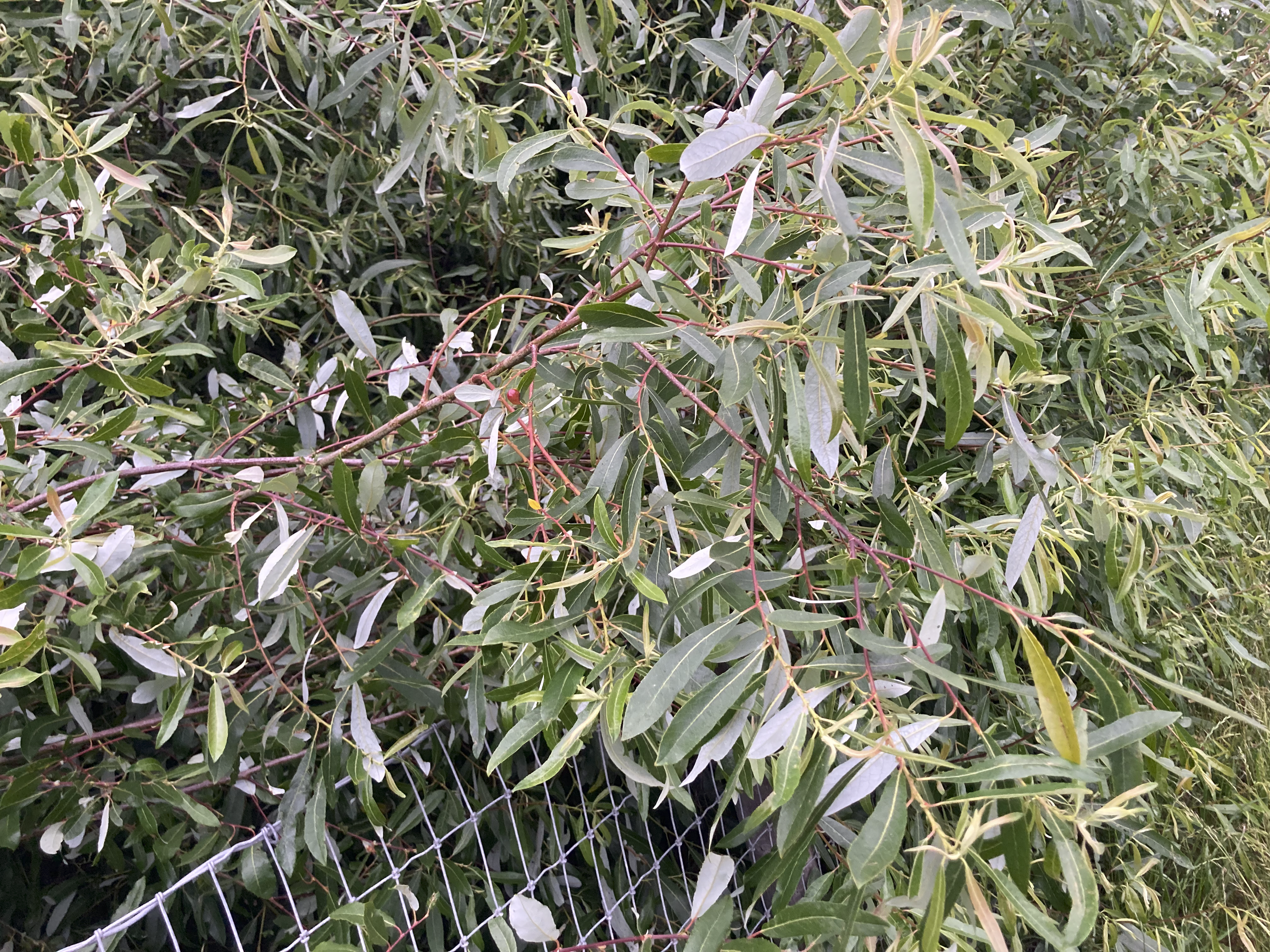
Salix lasiolepis foliage
