= Soda (disambiguation) =

Soda is a sweetened, carbonated, and usually flavored drink.

Soda or SODA may also refer to:

== Chemistry ==
- Some chemical compounds containing sodium
  - Sodium carbonate, washing soda or soda ash
  - Sodium bicarbonate, baking soda
  - Sodium hydroxide, caustic soda
  - Sodium oxide, an alkali metal oxide
- Soda glass, a common glass made with sodium carbonate or sodium oxide
- Soda lake, an alternate generic name for a salt lake, with high concentration of sodium carbonates
- Soda lime, a mixture of sodium, calcium, and potassium hydroxides
- Soda pulping, a process for paper production using sodium compounds

== Computing ==
- SODA (operating system)
- Service-oriented development of applications
- Service-oriented device architecture, to enable devices to be connected to a service-oriented architecture
- Soda PDF, a family of applications used on .pdf files
- Symposium on Discrete Algorithms, an annual academic conference in computer science

== Entertainment ==
- Czech Soda (Česká soda), a satirical Czech television show
- Soda (comics), a popular Belgian comics series by Philippe Tome and Bruno Gazzotti
- SODA Off-Road Racing, a 1997 video game
- Soda (TV series), a French television show
- Soda Pictures, a UK film distributor
- Soda Stereo, an Argentine rock band also known as "Soda"
- Soda (album), a 2024 album by The Rubens
- "Soda", a song by Azealia Banks from Broke with Expensive Taste
- "Soda", a song by Gob from Too Late... No Friends

== Food and drink ==
- Ice cream soda, a dessert dish
- Soda bread, a variety of quick bread
- Soda cracker, or saltine cracker
- Soda water, carbonated water

== People with the surname ==
- Soda (footballer) (1901-unknown), Brazilian footballer
- Chet Soda (1908–1989), Californian businessman associated with the Oakland Raiders
- Kazuhiro Soda (想田 和弘; born 1970), Japanese documentary filmmaker
- Kenji Soda (宗田 研二; born 1948), Japanese basketball player
- Masahito Soda (曽田 正人; born 1968), Japanese manga artist
- Yushi Soda (曽田 雄志; born 1978), retired Japanese footballer

== Places ==
- Soda Butte Creek, in Yellowstone National Park
- Soda Creek, in Canada
- Soda Gulch
- Soda Lakes
- Soda Mountain Wilderness
- Soda Mountains, in the eastern Mojave Desert in California
- Soda Springs (disambiguation), several places
- Soda Springs, California (disambiguation)
- Soda Springs, Idaho, a city in Caribou County, Idaho, United States
- Soda, Rajasthan, a village in India

== Other uses ==
- Soda (plant), a plant genus
- Salsola soda, the saltwort plant
- Short-course Off-road Drivers Association, a former off-road racing sanctioning body in the United States
- Sibling of a deaf adult, an acronym in deaf culture for a person with a deaf sibling
- Simple Ocean Data Assimilation, a reanalysis project
- Soda gun, a device used by bars to serve carbonated and non-carbonated drinks
- Soda locomotive, a variant of fireless locomotives
- Soda straw, a cave feature
- Specific oral direct anticoagulant, a type of anticoagulant
- Statement of Demonstrated Ability, a document for pilots

== See also ==
- Soda Lake (disambiguation)
- Soda pop (disambiguation)
- Sodha, a Rajput clan of India and Pakistan
