= Soda Springs =

Soda Springs may refer to several places in the United States:

- Soda Springs, California (disambiguation)
  - Soda Springs, Mendocino County, California (disambiguation)
    - Soda Springs (near Boonville), Mendocino County, California
    - Soda Springs (near Burbeck), Mendocino County, California
  - Soda Springs, Nevada County, California
  - Soda Springs, Placer County, California
  - Soda Springs, Tulare County, California
  - Soda Springs, California, former name of Zzyzx, California
- Soda Springs, Idaho, a small city in Caribou County, Idaho
- Soda Springs, Montana, an unincorporated place in Yellowstone County, Montana
- Soda Springs, Texas, an unincorporated place in Caldwell County, Texas

== See also ==
- Soda spring
- Soda Springs Cabin, in Yosemite National Park
