= Klamathon Fire =

2018 wildfire in Northern California

- Part of the 2018 California wildfires and 2018 Oregon wildfires
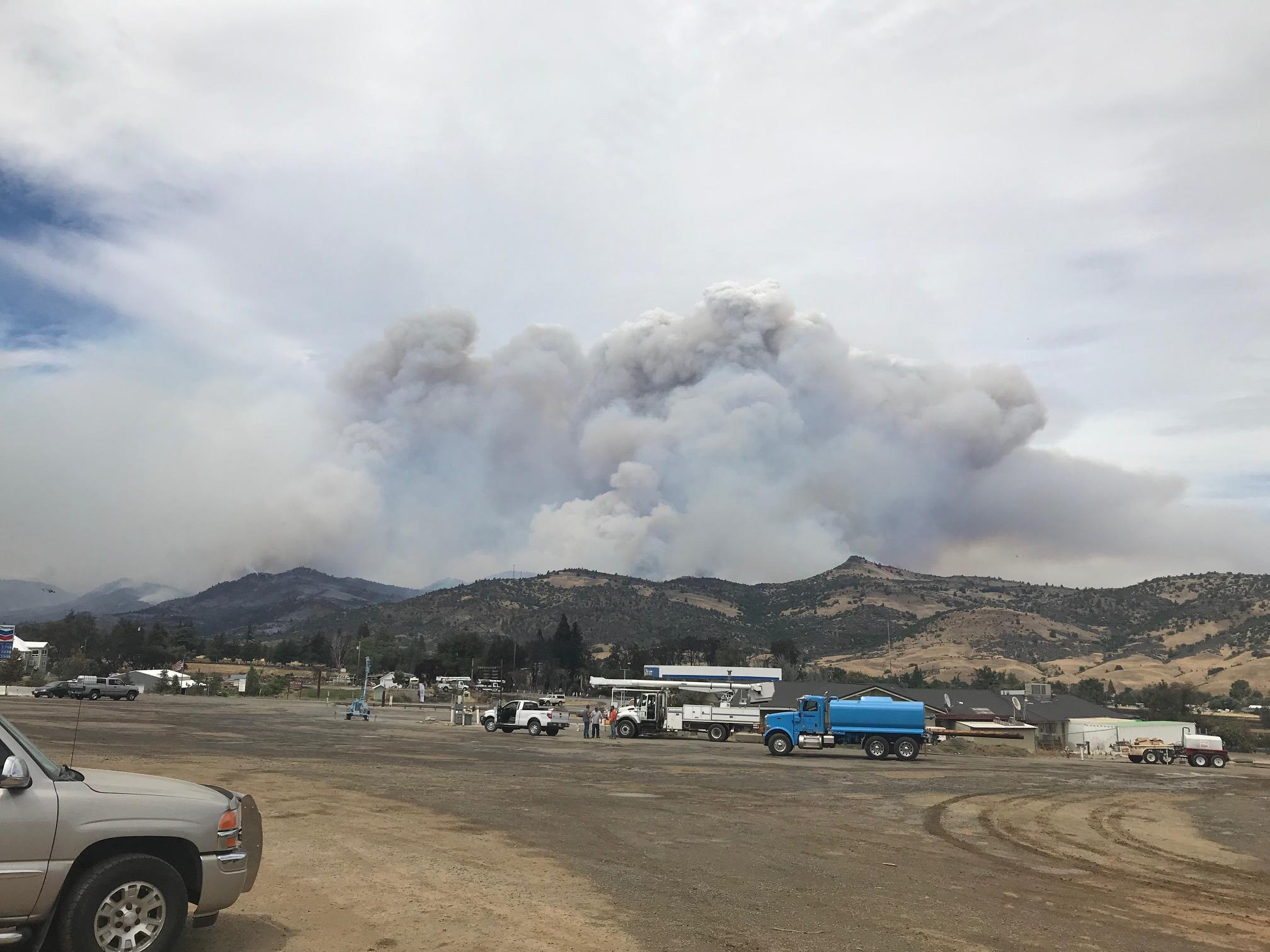
- The Klamathon Fire on July 9, 2018
- Date: July 5, 2018 –; July 21, 2018
- Location: Hornbrook, Siskiyou County, California, United States
- Coordinates: 41.893332°N 122.534655°W

Statistics
- Burned area: 38,008 acres (154 km^{2})

Impacts
- Deaths: 1
- Injuries: 3
- Structures lost: 82
- Cost: >$34.5 million (2018 USD)

Ignition
- Cause: Reckless burning

Map
- Location within California

Location of Klamathon Fire

The Klamathon Fire was a wildfire in Siskiyou County south of Hornbrook, California in the United States. The fire was reported on July 5, 2018 and was contained on July 21, after burning 38,008 acres (154 km^{2}). The fire threatened private timber lands along the California-Oregon border; public lands in the Klamath National Forest; Rogue River-Siskiyou National Forest; Jackson County, Oregon; communities of Hornbrook and Hilt, California; and Colestin, Oregon. It destroyed 82 structures, damaged 12 structures, injured three firefighters, and killed one civilian.

== Progression ==
The Klamathon Fire was reported on July 5, 2018 at 12:31 p.m. as a vegetation fire burning off Klamathon Road and Copco Road near Hornbrook, California. By the evening of July 6, the fire was reported at 9,600 acres (39 km^{2}) and five percent containment. The fire was reported as being extremely erratic, with the potential to spread into public lands, national forests, private timber lands, and communities in the area, including 600 homes. The California Department of Forestry and Fire Protection (Cal Fire) also reported concerns with cell phone towers on Horn Peak being impacted by the fire. Authorities evacuated the communities of Hornbrook and Hilt, California; Colestin, Oregon; as well the area surrounding Iron Gate Dam. Select roads were closed off Interstate 5 as well.

The fire had grown to 22,000 acres (89 km^{2}) by the evening of July 7, with 20 percent containment. The fire spread into Klamath National Forest, the Horseshoe Ranch Wildlife Area, and private timber stands. Additionally, one civilian was reported dead and two firefighters were injured. The next day, the fire had grown to threaten over 800 structures. It had already destroyed 81 buildings and damaged 12. An additional firefighter was reported as injured, bringing the total to three. Crews were able to hold the fire north of Hornbrook and the Klamath River, but fire threats increased for Hilt and Colestin.

By the morning of July 9, the fire had grown to over 32,000 acres (129 km^{2}) and was 30 percent contained. Ski areas around Mount Ashland remained impacted by road closures and evacuations. That evening, select evacuation orders were lifted for areas of Klamath River County Estates; East Iron Gate Reservoir Estates; the communities of Hilt and Colestin; the areas of Pheasant Valley, Airport Road; and Bogus Mountain. However, the fire remained a threat, threatening 1,222 structures by that evening and destroying an additional structure.

By the morning of July 11, the fire had burned 36,500 acres (148 km^{2}) and is 60 percent contained. The fire's behavior was minimal overnight, with burning continuing in the Horseshoe Ranch Wildlife Area; Soda Mountain Wilderness; and Klamath National Forest. The areas burning were inaccessible and fire crews focused on the more accessible northern flank of the fire until accessibility was increased.

The fire grew to final size of 38,008 acres (154 km^{2}) while fire suppression continued in the area, including erosion control near dozer lines. The fire was reported as contained on July 21. The cause of the fire was later determined to be "reckless burning of debris." The suspect, John Colin Eagle Skoda, was arrested and later charged with manslaughter in connection with the fire.

== Effects ==
The fire threatened a wide swath of the California-Oregon border region.

One civilian, John Karl Bermel, died in the Klamathon Fire. The body was found near his residence in Hornbrook, which as damaged by the fire. The cause of the death was related to the fire.

=== Environment ===
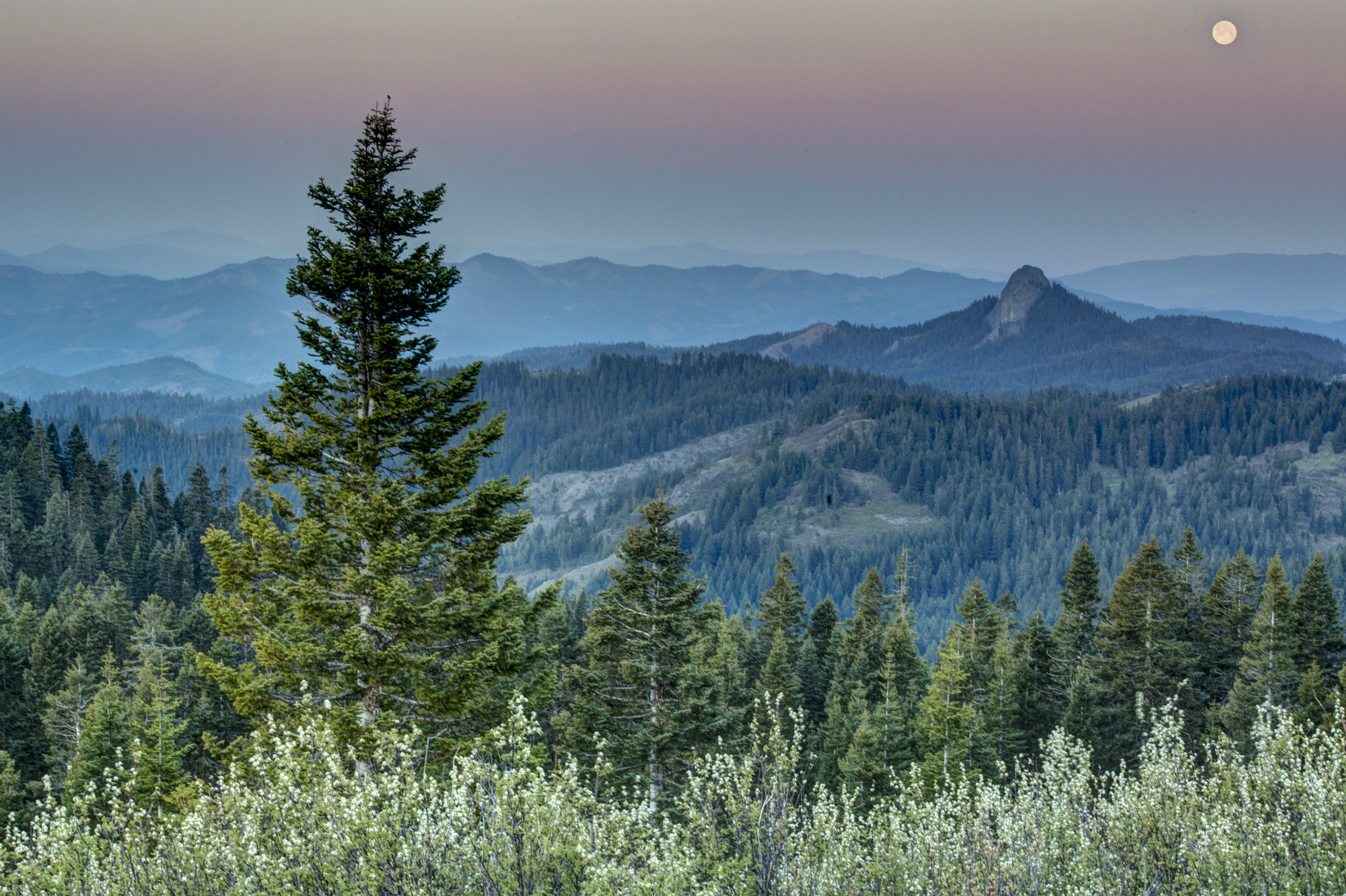
Threatened and endangered plants and animals in the Cascade–Siskiyou National Monument were threatened by the Klamathon Fire.

The Klamathon Fire burned land in the Klamath National Forest and the Horseshoe Ranch Wildlife Area. The fire currently threatened, public lands, natural and cultural resources in Rogue River-Siskiyou National Forest, and Jackson County, Oregon. Threatened and endangered species in the Cascade-Siskiyou National Monument and Soda Mountain Wilderness were also threatened by the fire.

=== Transportation ===
The fire threatened both road and railway transportation. When the fire was first reported, sections of Interstate 5 were closed, only to re-open the following day despite continued fire threats. The fire threatened the Yreka Western Railroad and the Central Oregon and Pacific Railroad.

=== Economic ===
The fire burned private timber stands along the California-Oregon border. Additionally, the fire threatened power plants at both the Iron Gate and Coptco Lake Reservoirs, as well as water systems in Yreka and Hornbrook. The fire also threatened Verizon-owned cell phone towers on Horn Peak.

=== Cultural ===
The Klamathon Fire threatened the historic Osburger Cabin.
