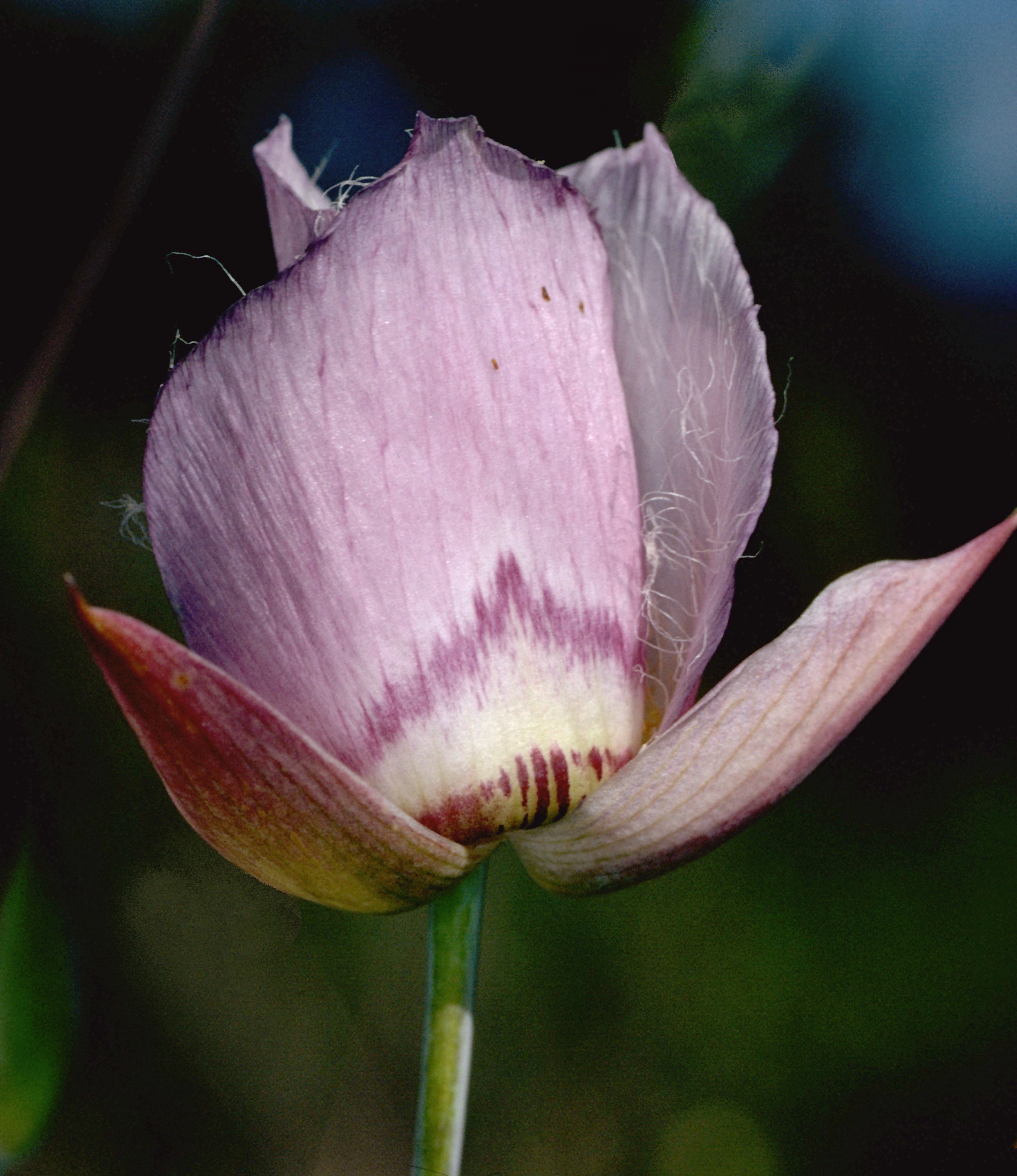

Conservation status
- Vulnerable (NatureServe)

Scientific classification
- Kingdom: Plantae
- Clade: Tracheophytes
- Clade: Angiosperms
- Clade: Monocots
- Order: Liliales
- Family: Liliaceae
- Genus: Calochortus
- Species: C. greenei

Binomial name
- Calochortus greenei S.Watson

= Calochortus greenei =

Species of flowering plant

Calochortus greenei is a species of flowering plant in the lily family, Liliaceae, known by the common name Greene's mariposa lily. It is native to northern California and southern Oregon, where it grows in grasslands and open forests in the Siskiyou Mountains. In June and July, the plant produces showy pink flowers after most surrounding vegetation has dried and turned yellow.

Despite its rarity and relatively few populations, C. greenei is not listed as threatened or endangered at the state or federal levels. Individual populations, though scattered, often contain many plants. Its primary threats include grazing, invasive species, and poaching.

== Description ==
Calochortus greenei is an herbaceous perennial emerging from an underground bulb, which is covered by a membranous coat. Plants produce a stout stem, 10–40 cm (4–20 in) tall and usually branched. At the base of the stem there is a single basal leaf, 10–30 cm (4–10 in) long and 2–3 cm (0.8–1 in) wide, which does not wither at flowering. One or two cauline leaves are arranged along the stem, with the upper leaf smaller than the lower one. Several narrow, leaflike bracts are also arranged along the stem where the inflorescence branches.

Each stem produces an inflorescence bearing one to five erect flowers, purple, pink, or lilac in color. The flowers have three petals, overlapping and arranged to form a bell, and three sepals, spreading nearly horizontally from the base of the flower. The sepals are 25–30 mm (0.98–1.2 in) in length, with pointed tips, and pink or lilac on both sides, sometimes with a dark purple blotch near the base. Compared to the sepals, the oval shaped petals are larger, about 30 mm (1 in) long. Their outer surfaces are pink to lilac and have patterned bases with two greenish-white bands alternating with two dark purple chevrons. The inner petal surfaces are lighter in color and covered in long, tangled hairs, which range from white in color along the upper half of the petal to bright yellow near the base. At the inner base of each petal, there is a yellow, crescent-shaped nectar gland. The anthers are white to lavender or lilac in color, blunt, 8–12 mm (0.3–0.5 in) long, and held on 10–14 mm (0.4–0.6 in) long filaments.

The inside of a flower

An immature fruit capsule

The fruit is an elliptic, three-winged capsule about 2–2.5 cm (0.8–1 in) long and 1.5 cm (0.59 in) wide, with a short beak at its tip. The seeds are numerous, irregularly shaped, and 4–6 mm (0.16–0.24 in) long. As with other closely-related members of its genus, C. greenei has a base chromosome number of 10.

== Taxonomy ==
The plant's species epithet, greenei, and its common name, Greene's mariposa lily, both refer to the botanist Edward Lee Greene who first collected Calochortus greenei in July, 1876. He collected the type specimen of C. greenei in Siskiyou County, California and sent collections of the plant to Sereno Watson, along with collections of two other undescribed species, C. persistens and C. monanthus. Watson confused the identities of these specimens and formally described C. greenei in 1879 based on a mix of specimens of C. greenei and what would later be named C. persistens. It was not until Francis Ownbey revised the genus in 1940 that C. persistens was given its own name and C. greenei's narrower identity was clarified.

Ownbey divided Calochortus into three sections and several subsections based on morphological traits, and Frank Callahan revised this subgeneric classification in 2001. In this division of the genus, C. greenei belongs to subsection Nitidi of section Calochortus, a group defined by campanulate flowers, erect or nearly erect inflorescences, petal shape and pubescence, and membranous bulb coats. A 2003 molecular phylogeny showed that genetic evidence did not support the monophyly of subsections in section Calochortus, but no revised division of the genus has been proposed.

The botanist Louis Henderson described the variety C. greenei var. calvus in 1931 from a population of plants in Jackson County, Oregon near the California border. He noted that these plants may represent a distinct species but included them within the morphologically similar species C. greenei. It is now considered a synonym of C. greenei, and taxonomic authorities do not recognize any infraspecies.

== Distribution and habitat ==
Calochortus greenei growing in habitat in Jackson County, Oregon

Calochortus greenei has a narrow geographic range, occurring in Siskiyou County, California and adjacent Jackson and Klamath Counties, Oregon. It grows in the Siskiyou Mountains and Shasta Valley at elevations of 700–1,400 m (2,300–4,600 ft), typically on volcanic substrates along slopes or hillsides. As with many species of Calochortus, populations of C. greenei are often individually large but geographically scattered.

Typical habitat for the plant includes open grasslands, shrublands, open pine or juniper woodlands, and conifer forests. Woody plants that co-occur with C. greenei include Quercus garryana, conifers such as Abies concolor, Calocedrus decurrens, Juniperus occidentalis, Pseudotsuga menziesii, Pinus contorta, Pinus jeffreyi, and Pinus ponderosa, and shrubs such as Arctostaphylos patula, Ceanothus cuneatus, Artemisia tridentata, and Rhus trilobata. Native grasses associated with the species include Festuca idahoensis and Festuca roemeri.

== Ecology ==
After recruitment, Calochortus greenei seedlings take approximately two to three years before producing flowers and roughly four to five years before producing fruit, although difficulty identifying young plants makes studying their development difficult.

After a period of seasonal dormancy, plants grow from March through July. The leaves emerge in early spring and persist through mid-summer, when the flowers bloom. Flowering occurs in June and July, by which time most of the surrounding vegetation has senesced and dried. The fruit sets in August, after which plants reenter dormancy.

Plants sometimes enter multi-year dormancy periods where no growth occurs. While dormancy delays growth, reproduction, and recruitment, it also contributes to low mortality rates. One study in the Cascade–Siskiyou National Monument found that the probability that a plant would enter dormancy was lower than 30% in any given year and negatively correlated with leaf width. Dormancy was also observed less frequently in plants growing in exclosures, which were not subject to herbivory by large mammals.

Although the pollination biology of C. greenei is not well documented, native bees, bumblebees, and honeybees are believed to be its primary pollinators. Other insects, including wasps, beetles, flies, moths, and butterflies are known to pollinate other species of Calochortus and may also be pollinators of C. greenei. Although its frequency is not well documented, vegetative reproduction through the production of bulb offsets is another means by which the plant spreads.

== Conservation ==
=== Conservation status and trends ===
The conservation organization NatureServe considers Calochortus greenei a vulnerable species (G3) globally. The Oregon Biodiversity Information Center includes the species on its list of taxa at the highest risk of extinction across their range (List 1), indicating that it is a species of highest conservation concern in the state, and lists it as a vulnerable species in the state (S3). The CNPS Inventory of Rare and Endangered Plants of California lists the species as moderately threatened in California (List 1B.2). Despite these listings, the species is not recognized at the state or federal level as an endangered or threatened species.

In Oregon, most sites where C. greenei grows enjoy some legal protections, falling within the Cascade–Siskiyou National Monument. In contrast, few, if any, of the sites in California are formally protected, though most populations occur on public land, including Bureau of Land Management land (24 sites), National forest land (10 sites), and land managed by state agencies (7 sites).

In 1988, a survey of C. greenei across its range estimated the global population as 8,450 individual plants, with 6,840 in California and 1,610 in Oregon. More recently, the population has been estimated as over 31,000 plants (including 24,625 plants in California and 10,000 plants in Oregon) spread across approximately 80 sites. While long-term conservation trends for the species are unknown, populations may have declined by 10–30% over the short-term.

=== Major threats ===
Grazing and herbivory, especially by cattle and deer, has been identified as a primary threat to C. greenei. A study in the Cascade–Siskiyou National monument used exclosures to study the effects of herbivory by large mammals and found that plants in exclosures were less likely to enter dormancy, produced larger leaves, and produced more flowers and fruit. On the other hand, native plant abundance did not improve in the exclosures over a ten year period, highlighting the importance of additional habitat restoration actions.

Another major threat to the conservation of C. greenei is the introduction of invasive species. Nonnative grasses including Poa bulbosa and Taeniatherum caput-medusae have replaced native grasses at many sites. At sites in the Interstate 5 Corridor, the invasive species Centaurea solstitialis is also abundant.

One study from 2003 to 2011 suggested that climate change is not likely to negatively impact the conservation of C. greenei and may in fact increase its viability. For example, hotter, drier springs may increase the likelihood of pollination by relieving stress on pollinators. The authors noted, however, that the short demographic record makes long-term forecasts uncertain.

== Cultivation ==
Many species of Calochortus, including C. greenei, have been grown in cultivation. One horticulturalist in Sonoma County, California reported successfully germinating seeds but that the young plants consistently died after one or two years across multiple attempts, possibly due to the mild climate. The plants most likely require cold, dry winters, some water during the spring, and summer drought, though little else is known about their requirements in cultivation.

Poaching for horticultural collection has been identified as a conservation threat to the species. Its narrow habitat requirements, especially related to soil type and moisture, make successful transplanting difficult.
