= Whittemore Gulch =

Geographic feature in California, US

Coordinates: 37.437718°N 122.369972°W

Whittemore Gulch is a valley in San Mateo County, California. It contains a small stream which is a tributary of Purisima Creek. The gulch is managed by the Midpeninsula Regional Open Space District as part of Purisima Creek Redwoods Open Space Preserve. The trail through the gulch is closed to bicycle and equestrian traffic.

== See also ==
- List of watercourses in the San Francisco Bay Area
