= Soda Springs, California =

Soda Springs, California may refer to:

- Mendocino County:
  - Soda Springs (near Boonville), Mendocino County, California
  - Soda Springs (near Burbeck), Mendocino County, California
- Tuolumne County:
  - Soda Springs (Yosemite National Park)
- Soda Springs, Nevada County, California, a community near Donner Pass
- Soda Springs, Placer County, California, a former resort on the North Fork of the American River
- Soda Springs, former name of Zzyzx, California, in San Bernardino County
