= Serene Lakes =

Lakes in northern California, U.S.

- Ice Lakes, Twin Lakes
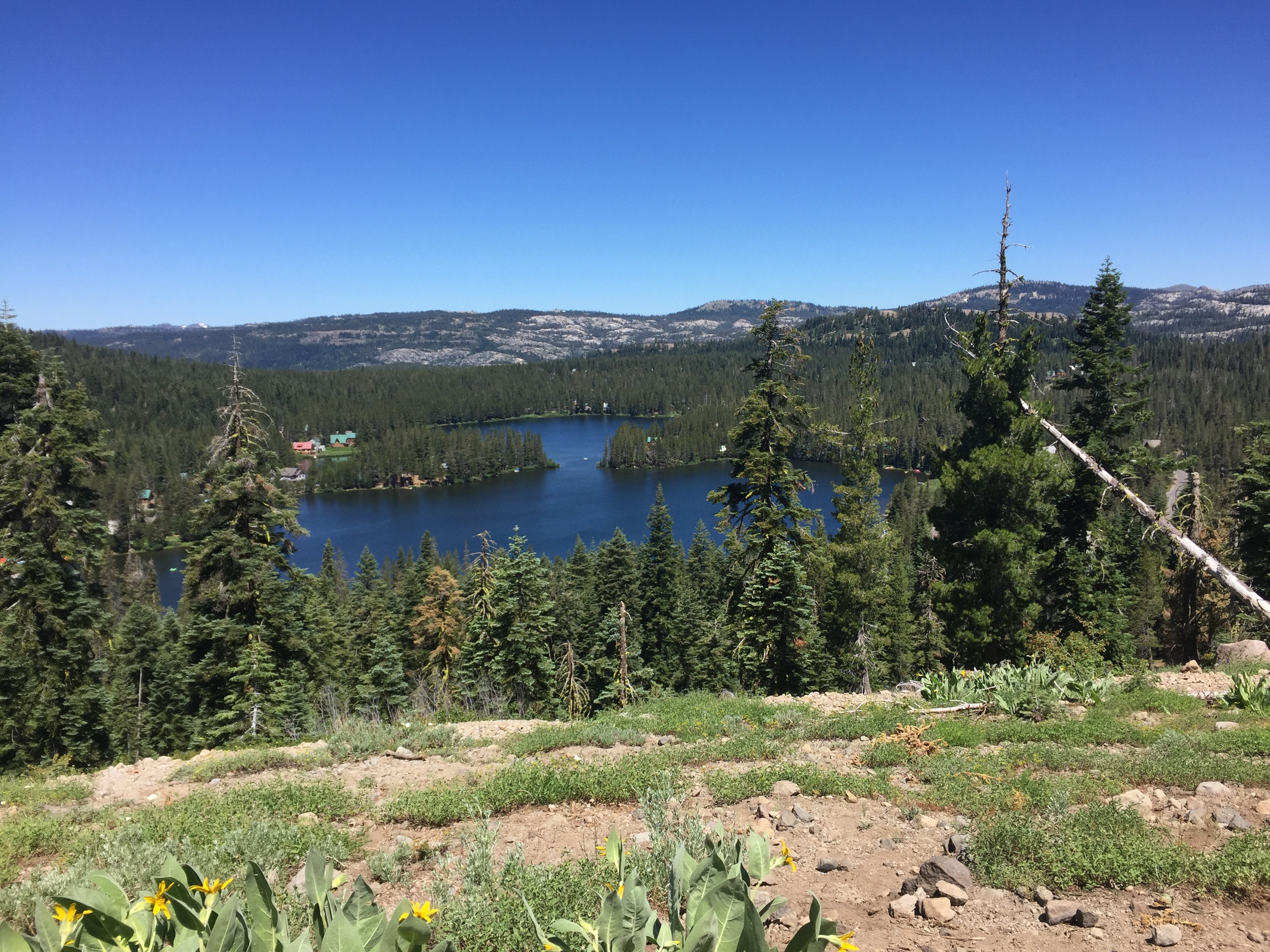
- Serene Lakes from Mount Rowton

- Location within California Location within the United States
- Location: Soda Springs, Placer County, California, United States
- Coordinates: 39°17′57″N 120°23′00″W
- Primary inflows: Serena Creek, other surrounding creeks
- Basin countries: United States
- Max. length: 0.62 mi (1.00 km)
- Max. width: 0.29 mi (0.47 km)
- Surface area: 0.12 sq mi (0.31 km^{2})
- Surface elevation: 6,910 ft (2,110 m)
- Islands: 2 (unnamed)

Serene Lakes (also called Ice Lakes) are a pair of freshwater lakes, located in the Sierra Nevada Mountains in Northern California, about 15 miles (24 km) northwest of Lake Tahoe. Serene Lakes consists of two connected bodies of water, Lake Serena and Lake Dulzura, which together span about 77 acres (31 ha). Located in the unincorporated community of Soda Springs in Placer County, CA, the lakes are adjacent to Interstate 80 to the north and Donner Pass to the east. The Geographic Names Information System ID for Serene Lakes is 254806.

== History ==
Serene Lakes was discovered during the mid-1800s, when the First transcontinental railroad was being constructed. The lakes were located along several routes during the California Gold Rush, including the historic California Trail, and the first settler, Fitz William Redding Jr, arrived in 1866.

Before the widespread adoption of refrigeration, Serene Lakes served as a source of ice for the city of San Francisco, earning the lakes the name "Ice Lakes". There is a belief by some that author Mark Twain visited the lakes, he named them Lake Dulzura and Lake Serena, which was combined to form "Serene Lakes".

== Recreation ==
Summer activities at Serene Lakes include fishing, windsurfing, sailing, and paddle-boating. Swimming and watersports are only permitted in Lake Dulzura, in order to protect the drinking water derived from Lake Serena. Lake Dulzura contains a private property owners beach, dock, and beach volleyball courts. The lakes are surrounded by several hiking trails, including Castle Pass, Summit Station Trail, and Hoelter Hall Trail. Many of the trails span the mountains around the lake, some leading to mountaintops, such as Mount Rowton.

Winter activities include cross-country skiing and snowshoeing. Serene Lakes are also surrounded by several ski resorts, including Sugar Bowl Ski Resort and Soda Springs Mountain Resort, and ice skating is available when the frozen lake is accessible.

== See also ==
- List of lakes in California
