= Purisima Creek (San Mateo County) =

Stream in California, United States

Coordinates: 37.404109°N 122.427475°W

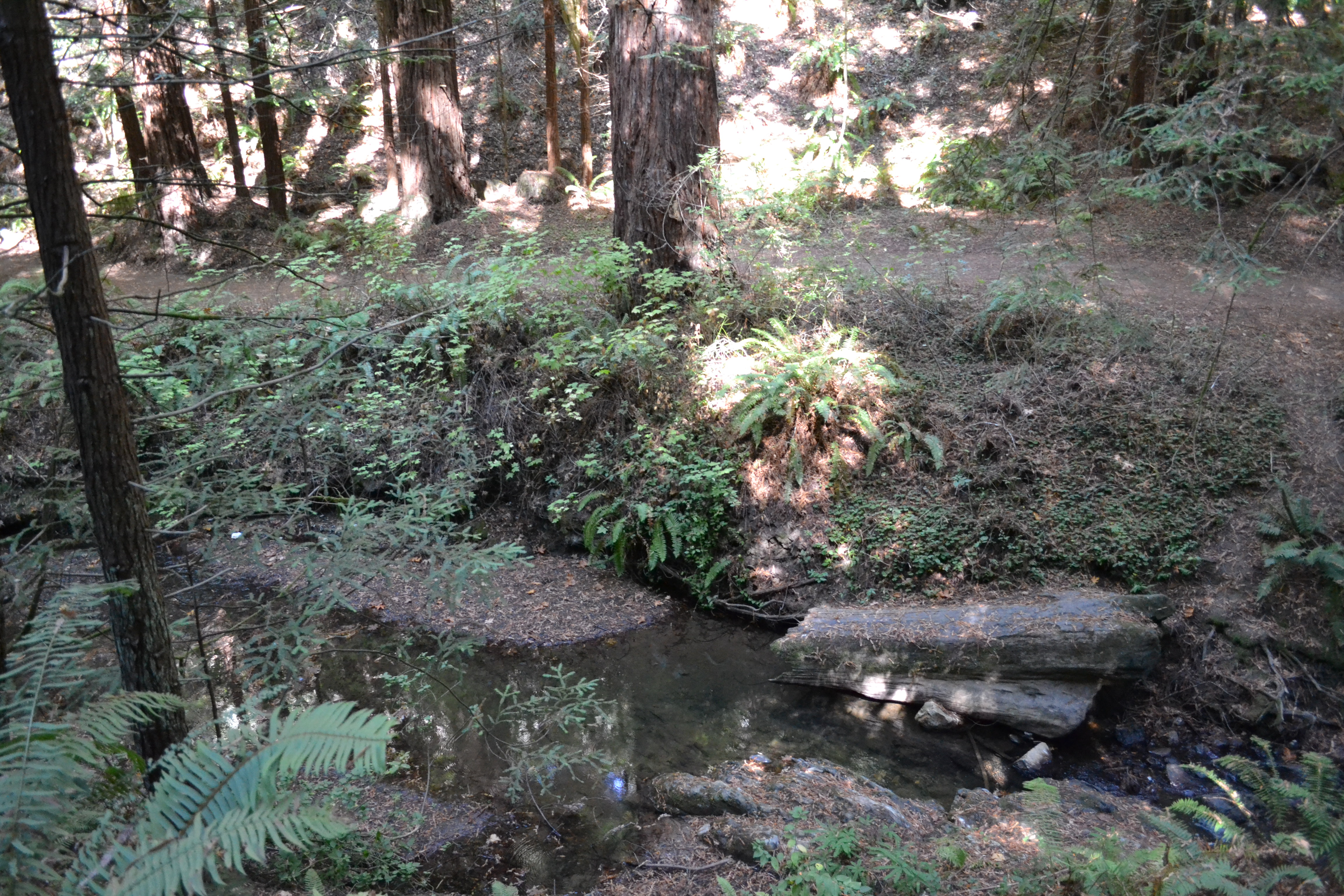
Purisima Creek

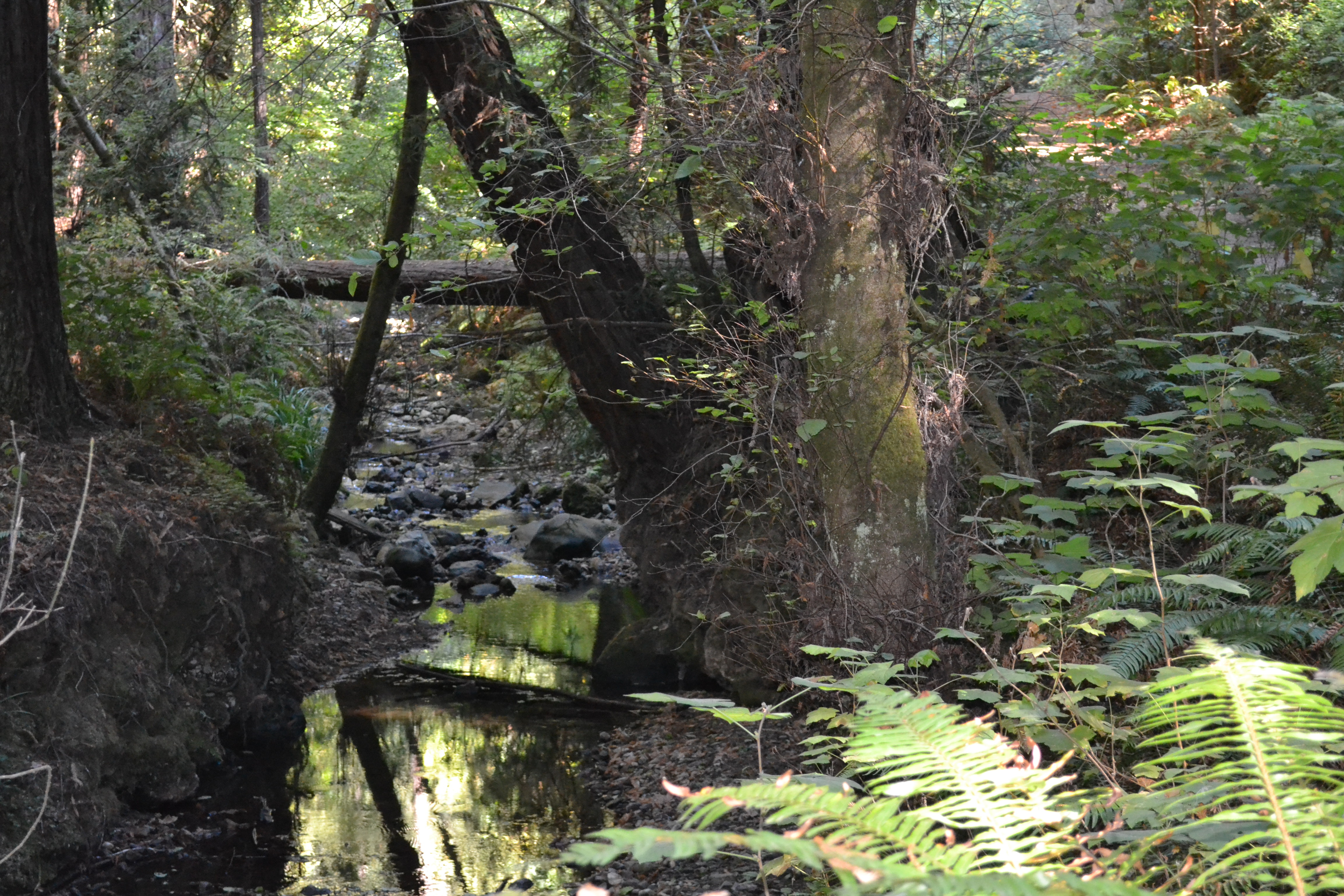
Another view of the creek

Purisima Creek is an 8.0-mile-long (12.9 km) stream in San Mateo County, California which rises 1.3 miles (2.1 km) north of Sierra Morena, a mountain in the Santa Cruz Mountains, and flows westward to the Pacific Ocean 2.3 miles (3.7 km) south-southeast of Miramontes Point. Much of its watershed has been incorporated in the Purisima Creek Redwoods Open Space Preserve.

== History ==
The first European land exploration of Alta California, the Spanish Portolà expedition, passed through the area on its way north, camping near the creek on October 27, 1769. They stopped for the night at an abandoned Torose village at the northern side of the stream, close to the coast. The guides told them that the villagers had moved into the mountains. The stream was named Saint Ives. "...where we came upon an empty village; those belonging to the preceding place said they had moved into the mountains. We were accompanied by four heathens belonging to the spot we set out from." - Journal of Fray Juan Crespí. "The country had a gloomy aspect; the hills were bare and treeless, and, consequently, without fire-wood. On the northern side of this stream there were some abandoned Indian huts; all who had the curiosity to look in to see these were covered with fleas. On the road we had to dig a very long slope over which we had to make a passage in order to descend to a small stream where it empties into the sea." - Diary of Miguel Costansó.

== Tributaries ==
- Walker Gulch
- Whittemore Gulch
- Grabtown Gulch
- Soda Gulch

== Ecology ==
The California Academy of Sciences has a tule elk (Cervus canadensis nannodes) skull fragment unearthed one mile inland from the mouth of Purisima Creek in 1951. Elk were thought to be extirpated from the entire state by 1873 when elk hunting was ultimately banned by the California Legislature, and current herds are descended from a small number of elk survivors discovered in southern San Joaquin County.

== See also ==
- Purissima, California
- List of watercourses in the San Francisco Bay Area
