= Parsons Memorial Lodge =

- U.S. National Register of Historic Places
- U.S. National Historic Landmark
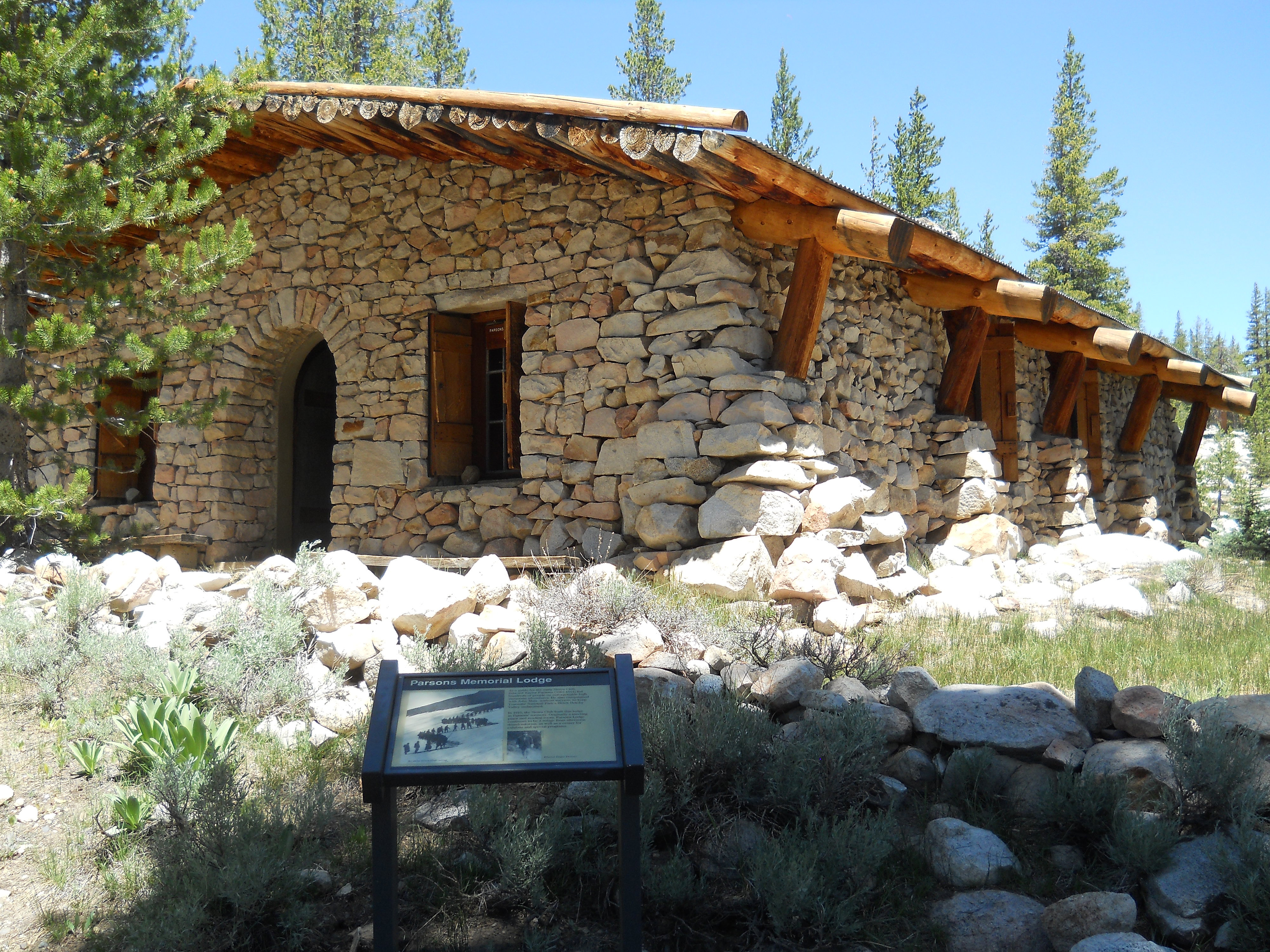

- Location within California Location within the United States
- Location: Tuolumne Meadows, Yosemite National Park, California
- Coordinates: 37°52′42.36″N 119°21′59.82″W
- Built: 1915
- Architect: Bernard Maybeck; Mark H. White
- Architectural style: National Park Service Rustic
- NRHP reference No.: 79000283

Significant dates
- Added to NRHP: April 30, 1979
- Designated NHL: May 28, 1987

The Parsons Memorial Lodge is a small building built in 1915 by the Sierra Club at the northern end of Tuolumne Meadows in Yosemite National Park. It was one of the earliest structures built of stone in a national park.

== Memorial ==
The lodge is a memorial to Edward Taylor Parsons, a New Yorker who moved to Berkeley, California and joined the Sierra Club about 1900. Parsons worked with William E. Colby to establish the club's outings program, and served as a director of the club from 1905 to 1914. Parsons was heavily involved in the losing fight against the flooding of the Hetch Hetchy Valley to provide a municipal water source for San Francisco. Parsons died in 1914, and in memorial the Sierra Club established a fund to build a club meeting house, library and headquarters in Yosemite. The site at Tuolumne Meadows was chosen for its accessibility to park backcountry and its location near Soda Springs, a location that the Sierra Club wished to safeguard.

== The lodge's design ==
It is not clear who designed the Lodge. Mark White, brother-in-law and partner in Maybeck and White to architect Bernard Maybeck, was credited at the time of the lodge's completion. White was a Sierra Club member. Maybeck scholars Gray Brechln and Kenneth Cardwell have suggested that Maybeck was involved in the design, chiefly through similarities to Maybeck-designed buildings at Lake Tahoe. Maybeck is alleged to have done the conceptual design, which was developed by White and White's brother John, who would go in to design the LeConte Memorial Lodge.

== Description ==
The Parsons Memorial Lodge is a 1,400-square-foot (130 m^{2}) one story stone building, accessible only from June through October in most years. The walls are rubble masonry with a concrete core, using local pink feldspar and gray granite, bedded with deeply raked mortar joints, and tapering from three feet at their base to two feet at the top. The door is arched with heavy stonework. The low-pitched roof is framed with peeled log rafters, about 18 inches (46 cm) in diameter with interior and exterior log braces resting on low buttresses projecting from the walls on the east and west sides. The rafters are similar to the vigas found in American Southwestern architecture. Smaller peeled logs analogous to latillas rest on top of the rafter logs, running perpendicular, topped by roofing paper and a galvanized metal top surface. The interior features a massive fireplace on the north wall opposite the entrance. There are two windows with benches below them in the east, west and south walls.

== Modifications to the lodge ==
The lodge has been modified slightly. In 1935 a concrete floor was installed over what had apparently been a dirt surface. Wood surfaces were placed over the stone benches, and the windows and shutters were studded with nails to deter bears. The lodge is still in use today, though it is now managed by the National Park Service. It is representative of the Bay Area architectural influences adapted by Bernard Maybeck for the extreme weather variations on the high valley, and National Park Service Rustic.

== The lodge declared a National Historic Landmark ==
It was declared a National Historic Landmark in 1987.
