= Soda Lake =

Soda lake may refer to:

- A soda lake or alkaline lake (a lake with high alkalinity)
- Soda Lake (San Bernardino County) in California
- Soda Lake (San Luis Obispo County) in California
- Soda Lakes (Soda Lake and Little Soda Lake, near Fallon, Nevada)
- Soda Lake (Washington State)
- A number of Rift Valley lakes in Africa
- a salt lake
