= Boccard Point =

- Juniper Ridge
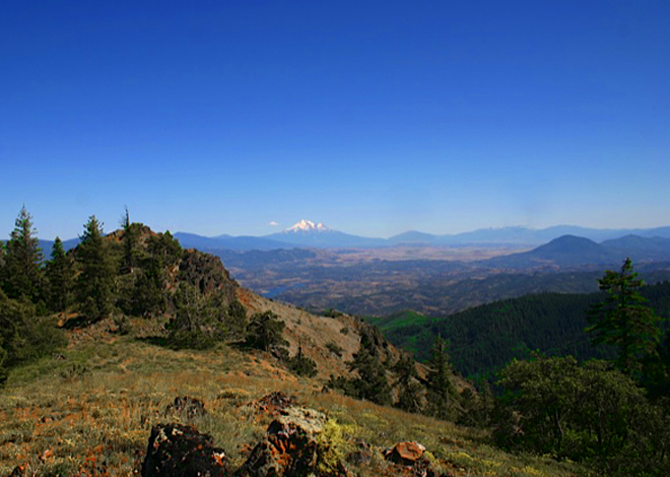

Highest point
- Elevation: 5,900 ft (1,798 m) NGVD 29
- Prominence: 200 ft (61 m)
- Coordinates: 42°03′20″N 122°29′06″W

Geography
- Location within Oregon
- Location: Jackson County, Oregon, U.S.
- Topo map: USGS Soda Mountain

Boccard Point is a mountain summit in Jackson County, Oregon, United States with an elevation of 5,900 feet (1,798 m).

== Environs ==
Boccard Point is located in the Soda Mountain Wilderness, which was designated in the spring of 2009 by the United States Congress, and is managed by the Bureau of Land Management.

The surrounding wilderness encompasses a large amount of biological and geological diversity, covering the transition between Oregon's eastern deserts, and mountainous fir forests. The mountain and associated wilderness is located southeast of the cities of Medford and Ashland.

== Trails ==
Since the designation of the Soda Mountain Wilderness, the road leading to Boccard Point had been decommissioned, and deterioration had made it difficult to traverse. In 2014, the trail was restored by the nonprofit Siskiyou Mountain Club.

== Name ==
The mountain was named after the American biologist and environmentalist Bruce Boccard. Boccard Point was his favorite spot on the mountain and was a point he called "Juniper Ridge". In 1997, the U.S. Board on Geographic Names approved naming the point in his honor.
