= Grabtown Gulch =

Valley in California, United States

Coordinates: 37.433829°N 122.348583°W

Grabtown Gulch is a valley in San Mateo County, California. It contains a stream which is a tributary of Purisima Creek.

== Background ==
Grabtown Gulch (Purissima Redwoods OSP): Gulch below the site of the trading center and lumber camp of Grabtown on Tunitas Road, originally called Gilbert's Camp in the 1880s. The origin of the name is attributed to the tendency of its inhabitants to lay claim to land and/or anything of value that wasn't nailed down.

== See also ==
- List of watercourses in the San Francisco Bay Area
