= Hornbrook, California =

- Unincorporated Community; Census Designated Place
- Location in Siskiyou County and California

- Location in the United States
- Coordinates: 41°54′35″N 122°33′27″W
- Country: United States
- State: California
- County: Siskiyou

Area
  - Total: 1.176 sq mi (3.047 km^{2})
  - Land: 1.165 sq mi (3.017 km^{2})
  - Water: 0.011 sq mi (0.029 km^{2}) 0.96%
- Elevation: 2,172 ft (662 m)

Population (2020)
  - Total: 266
  - Density: 228/sq mi (88.2/km^{2})
- Time zone: UTC-8 (Pacific (PST))
  - Summer (DST): UTC-7 (PDT)
- ZIP code: 96044
- Area code: 530
- FIPS code: 06-34694
- GNIS feature ID: 0266820

Hornbrook is a census-designated place (CDP) in Siskiyou County, California, United States. Its population is 266 as of the 2020 census, up from 248 from the 2010 census. It was named by the Southern Pacific Railroad in 1886, derived from the brook that ran through David Horn's property.

== Geography ==
Hornbrook is located at 41°54′35″N 122°33′27″W (41.909594, -122.557628).

According to the United States Census Bureau, the CDP has a total area of 1.2 square miles (3.1 km^{2}), of which 99.04% is land and 0.96% is water.

=== Climate ===
This region experiences warm (but not hot) and dry summers, with no average monthly temperatures above 71.6 °F (22.0 °C). According to the Köppen Climate Classification system, Hornbrook has a warm-summer Mediterranean climate, abbreviated Csb on climate maps.

Climate data for Hornbrook, CA
Month	Jan	Feb	Mar	Apr	May	Jun	Jul	Aug	Sep	Oct	Nov	Dec	Year
Record high °F (°C)	64 (18)	73 (23)	80 (27)	90 (32)	103 (39)	106 (41)	109 (43)	110 (43)	107 (42)	93 (34)	79 (26)	65 (18)	110 (43)
Mean daily maximum °F (°C)	45.7 (7.6)	51.4 (10.8)	57.3 (14.1)	62.7 (17.1)	72.2 (22.3)	80.7 (27.1)	91.0 (32.8)	89.9 (32.2)	81.8 (27.7)	68.6 (20.3)	51.9 (11.1)	44.9 (7.2)	66.5 (19.2)
Mean daily minimum °F (°C)	26.2 (−3.2)	27.8 (−2.3)	30.3 (−0.9)	34.1 (1.2)	40.6 (4.8)	46.8 (8.2)	52.9 (11.6)	51.0 (10.6)	43.6 (6.4)	36.0 (2.2)	29.7 (−1.3)	26.0 (−3.3)	37.1 (2.8)
Record low °F (°C)	−9 (−23)	−11 (−24)	0 (−18)	18 (−8)	21 (−6)	28 (−2)	34 (1)	33 (1)	27 (−3)	12 (−11)	8 (−13)	−11 (−24)	−11 (−24)
Average precipitation inches (mm)	2.89 (73)	2.42 (61)	1.77 (45)	1.14 (29)	1.17 (30)	0.86 (22)	0.37 (9.4)	0.56 (14)	0.69 (18)	1.38 (35)	3.03 (77)	3.32 (84)	19.60 (498)
Average snowfall inches (cm)	4.8 (12)	2.9 (7.4)	1.3 (3.3)	0.4 (1.0)	0 (0)	0 (0)	0 (0)	0 (0)	0 (0)	0 (0)	1.6 (4.1)	4.0 (10)	15.0 (38)
Source 1:
Source 2:

== Demographics ==
Historical population
Census	Pop.	Note	%±
2000	286		—
2010	248		−13.3%
2020	266		7.3%
U.S. Decennial Census; 1860–1870 1880-1890; 1900 1910 1920; 1930 1940 1950; 1960 1970 1980; 1990 2000 2010

Hornbrook first appeared as a census designated place in the 2000 U.S. census.

=== 2010 ===
The 2010 United States census reported that Hornbrook had a population of 248. The population density was 210.8 inhabitants per square mile (81.4/km^{2}). The racial makeup of Hornbrook was 195 (78.6%) White, 0 (0.0%) African American, 15 (6.0%) Native American, 0 (0.0%) Asian, 0 (0.0%) Pacific Islander, 10 (4.0%) from other races, and 28 (11.3%) from two or more races. Hispanic or Latino of any race were 19 persons (7.7%).

The Census reported that 248 people (100% of the population) lived in households, 0 (0%) lived in non-institutionalized group quarters, and 0 (0%) were institutionalized.

There were 108 households, out of which 23 (21.3%) had children under the age of 18 living in them, 46 (42.6%) were opposite-sex married couples living together, 13 (12.0%) had a female householder with no husband present, 2 (1.9%) had a male householder with no wife present. There were 7 (6.5%) unmarried opposite-sex partnerships, and 1 (0.9%) same-sex married couples or partnerships. 40 households (37.0%) were made up of individuals, and 16 (14.8%) had someone living alone who was 65 years of age or older. The average household size was 2.30. There were 61 families (56.5% of all households); the average family size was 3.11.

The population was spread out, with 50 people (20.2%) under the age of 18, 18 people (7.3%) aged 18 to 24, 45 people (18.1%) aged 25 to 44, 82 people (33.1%) aged 45 to 64, and 53 people (21.4%) who were 65 years of age or older. The median age was 46.7 years. For every 100 females, there were 87.9 males. For every 100 females age 18 and over, there were 85.0 males.

There were 156 housing units at an average density of 132.6 per square mile (51.2/km^{2}), of which 72 (66.7%) were owner-occupied, and 36 (33.3%) were occupied by renters. The homeowner vacancy rate was 6.3%; the rental vacancy rate was 11.9%. 159 people (64.1% of the population) lived in owner-occupied housing units and 89 people (35.9%) lived in rental housing units.

=== 2000 ===
As of the census of 2000, there were 286 people, 120 households, and 75 families residing in the CDP. The population density was 245.5 inhabitants per square mile (94.8/km^{2}). There were 148 housing units at an average density of 127.0 per square mile (49.0/km^{2}). The racial makeup of the CDP was 86.01% White, 4.90% Native American, 0.70% Pacific Islander, 4.90% from other races, and 3.50% from two or more races. Hispanic or Latino of any race were 9.79% of the population.

There were 121 households, out of which 23.3% had children under the age of 18 living with them, 39.2% were married couples living together, 18.3% had a female householder with no husband present, and 36.7% were non-families. 30.8% of all households were made up of individuals, and 15.0% had someone living alone who was 65 years of age or older. The average household size was 2.38 and the average family size was 2.91.

In the CDP, the population was spread out, with 22.0% under the age of 18, 8.0% from 18 to 24, 22.7% from 25 to 44, 24.1% from 45 to 64, and 23.1% who were 65 years of age or older. The median age was 42 years. For every 100 females, there were 83.3 males. For every 100 females age 18 and over, there were 79.8 males.

The median income for a household in the CDP was $26,094, and the median income for a family was $30,500. Males had a median income of $28,750 versus $16,667 for females. The per capita income for the CDP was $14,907. About 19.8% of families and 21.3% of the population were below the poverty line, including 30.3% of those under the age of eighteen and 13.0% of those 65 or over.

== Politics ==
In the state legislature Hornbrook is in the 1st senatorial district, represented by Republican Megan Dahle, and the 1st Assembly district, represented by Republican Heather Hadwick.

Federally, Hornbrook is in California's 1st congressional district, represented by Republican James Gallagher.

== Notable people ==
John Samuel Dunaway - U.S. Fighter Pilot Ace - WWII - Distinguished Flying Cross - Missing in Action 1944 - Born in Hornbrook, CA 1922

== See also ==
- Klamathon Fire
