= New York Canyon Falls =

Waterfall in California

Coordinates: 39°12′07″N 120°30′37″W

New York Canyon Falls is a waterfall in the Tahoe National Forest in the Sierra Nevada, Placer County, California. The falls are an approximately 500-foot (150 m) vertical drop on New York Canyon Creek, a tributary of the North Fork American River. The falls are about 10 miles (16 km) southeast of Yuba Pass. There is no trail leading to the falls, although they are accessible by a difficult scramble.

East Snow Mountain Falls is nearby.

== See also ==
- List of waterfalls
- List of waterfalls of California
