= Soda pop (disambiguation) =

Soda pop is an American regional term for a soft drink that’s sweetened and carbonated.

Soda pop may also refer to:

== Music ==
- "Soda Pop" (song), a song by the Saja Boys from the film KPop Demon Hunters
- "Soda Pop", a song by Britney Spears from her 1999 album ...Baby One More Time
- "Soda Pop", a song by John Fogerty from his 1986 album Eye of the Zombie
- "Soda Pop", a song by Robbie Williams featuring Michael Bublé from Williams' 2013 album Swings Both Ways
- "I Got You Babe" / "Soda Pop", by the cast of Bo' Selecta!

== Other uses ==
- Soda pop (confectionery), a confectionery product
- Soda Pop (novel), the English translation of the Swedish children's classic Loranga, Masarin och Dartanjang

== See also ==
- Soda Popinski, a character from the Punch-Out!! series of video games
- Soda Poppa, a 1931 short animated film
- Soda Poppers, a group of characters from the video game Sam & Max Save the World
- Sodapoppin (born 1994), an American Twitch streamer
- Sodapop Curtis, a character in 1967 novel The Outsiders by S. E. Hinton
- Soda Pop * Rip Off, the debut album by Slant 6
