= East Snow Mountain Falls =

Waterfall in California, United States

Coordinates: 39°14′29″N 120°26′51″W

East Snow Mountain Falls is a seasonal waterfall in the Sierra Nevada in Placer County, California. At 2,200 feet (670 m), it is the second tallest measured waterfall in California after Yosemite Falls. The falls are a long cascade consisting of dozens of smaller drops. Due to the small size of its drainage basin, the falls usually flow only from December through to July.

The falls occur on an unnamed stream on the eastern face of Snow Mountain, which drains into the Royal Gorge of the North Fork American River. They are accessed by a strenuous 7-mile (11 km), one-way hike from Cascade Lakes, near Soda Springs.

== See also ==
- List of waterfalls
- List of waterfalls in California
- New York Canyon Falls
