= Soda Lake (Washington) =

Lake in Grant County, Washington, United States

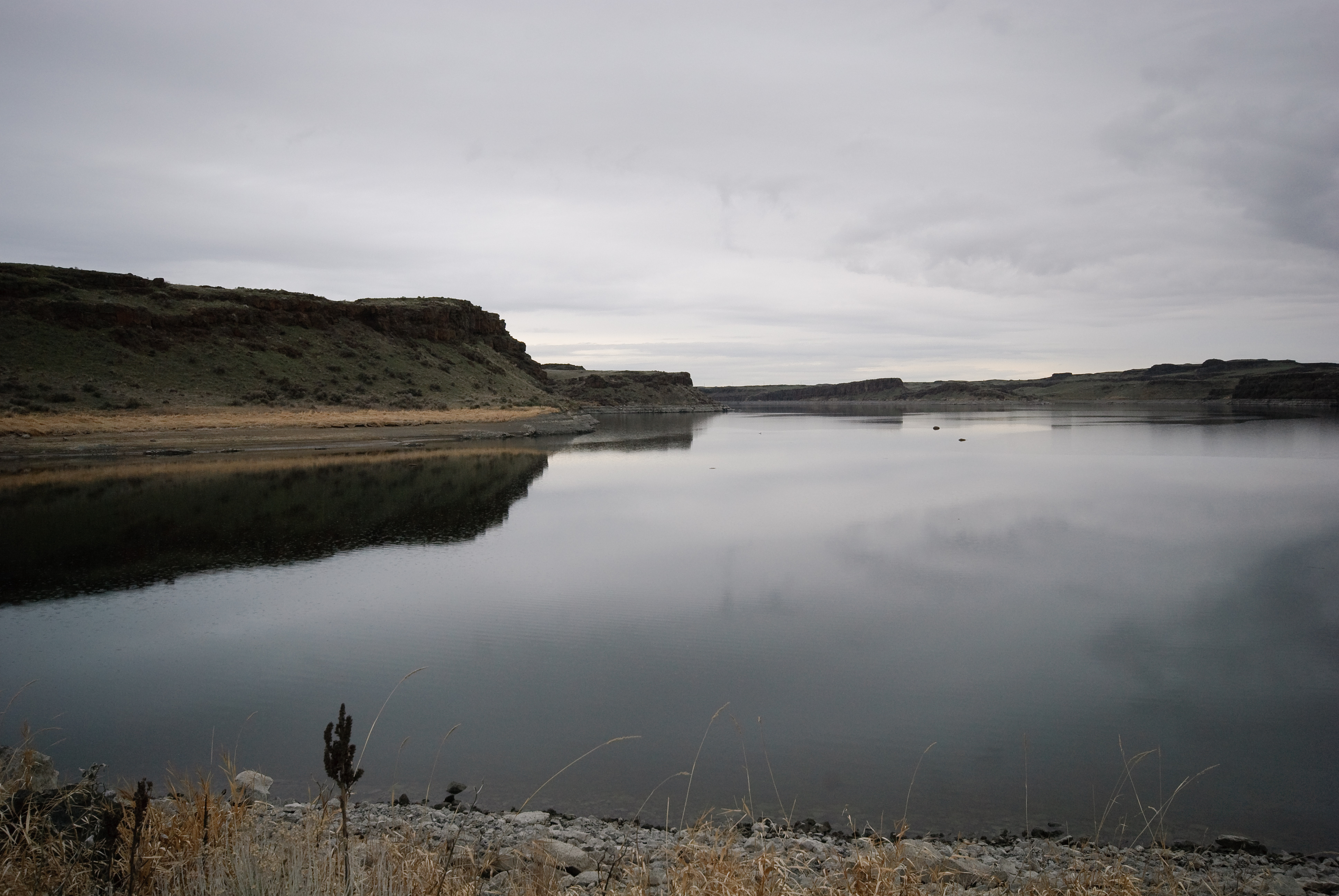
- Soda Lake, seen from the Soda lake dam

- Location within Washington (state) Location within the United States
- Location: Grant County, Washington
- Coordinates: 46°57′49.8″N 119°14′16.74″W
- Part of: Potholes Reservoir
- River sources: Potholes Reservoir Irrigation Canals
- Surface area: 145.1 acres (58.7 ha)
- Surface elevation: 1,002 ft (305 m)
- Website: http://wdfw.wa.gov/fishing/washington/392/

Soda lake is a lake in Grant County, Washington, United States.
