= Soda Springs Cabin =

Historic structure in Yosemite National Park, California

- U.S. National Register of Historic Places
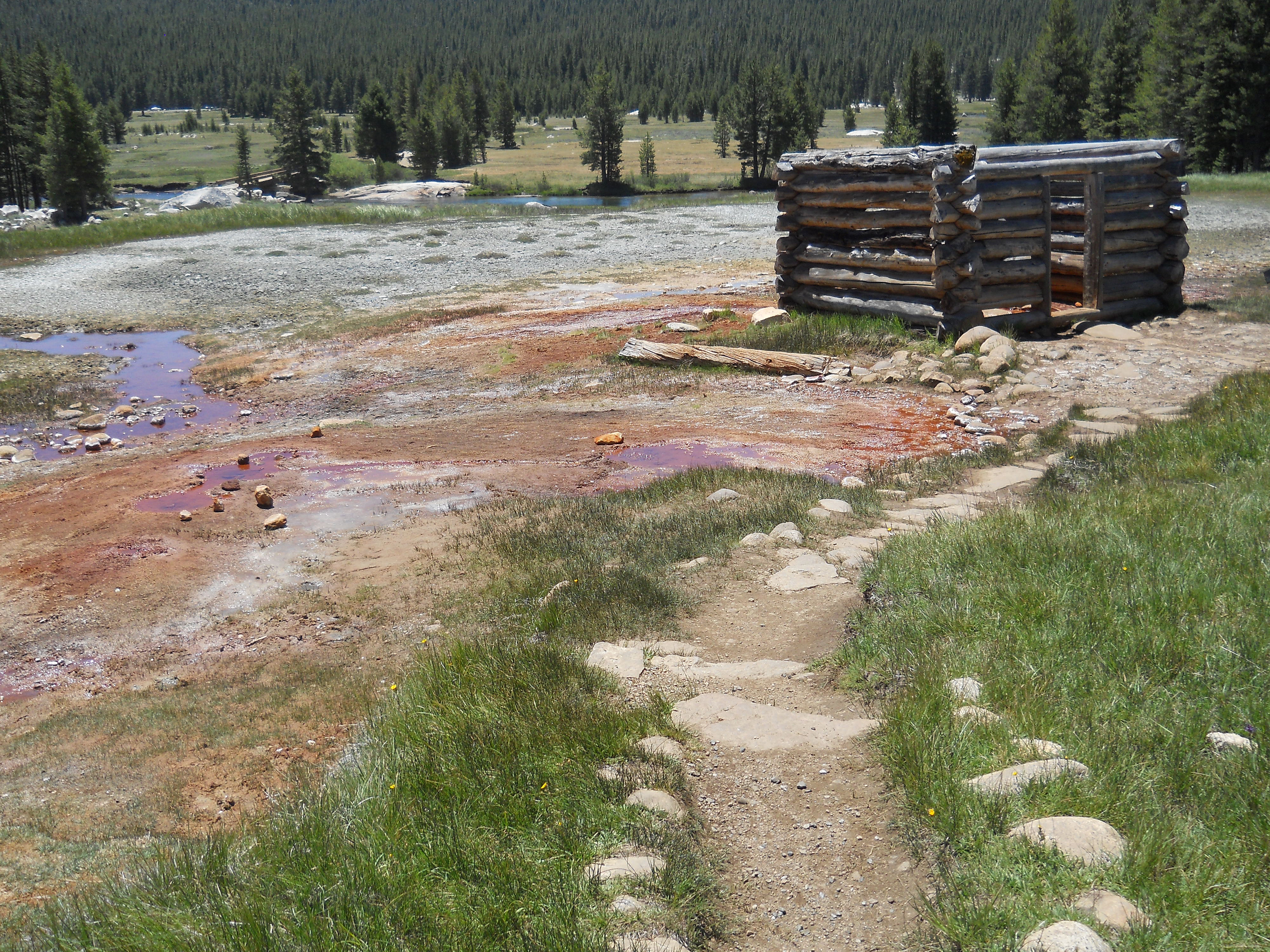

- Location within California Location within the United States
- Nearest city: Lee Vining, California
- Coordinates: 37°52′44″N 119°21′56″W
- Area: less than one acre
- Built: 1885
- Architect: Lembert, John Baptiste
- NRHP reference No.: 79000282
- Added to NRHP: April 19, 1979

The Soda Springs Cabin is a historic structure in Yosemite National Park in the US, built over Soda Springs. It was built around the year 1889 by John Baptist Lembert, the first white settler on the Tuolumne Meadows area of Yosemite. Lembert had filed a claim to 160 acres (65 ha) in Tuolumne Meadows in 1885 after spending three summers in the area with a flock of angora goats. He built a log cabin directly over the largest soda spring in the area. Although the property was within the park boundaries, Lembert received a patent to the property in 1895. Lembert's cabin was built along the Great Sierra Wagon Road over the Sierra Nevada. He also became a guide for tourists in the high country, gaining a reputation as a naturalist and entomologist. He spent the winter months near Cascade Creek in the Yosemite Valley.

The ruins of the cabin are located directly over the gaseous spring and are thought to have functioned as a spring-house, rather than as a dwelling, preventing livestock from fouling the spring. The cabin measures 9 feet (2.7 m) by 11 feet (3.4 m). Its walls extend to about 7 feet (2.1 m). There is no roof. The cabin had no windows and one door in the north side. The logs are laid with V-notched joints.

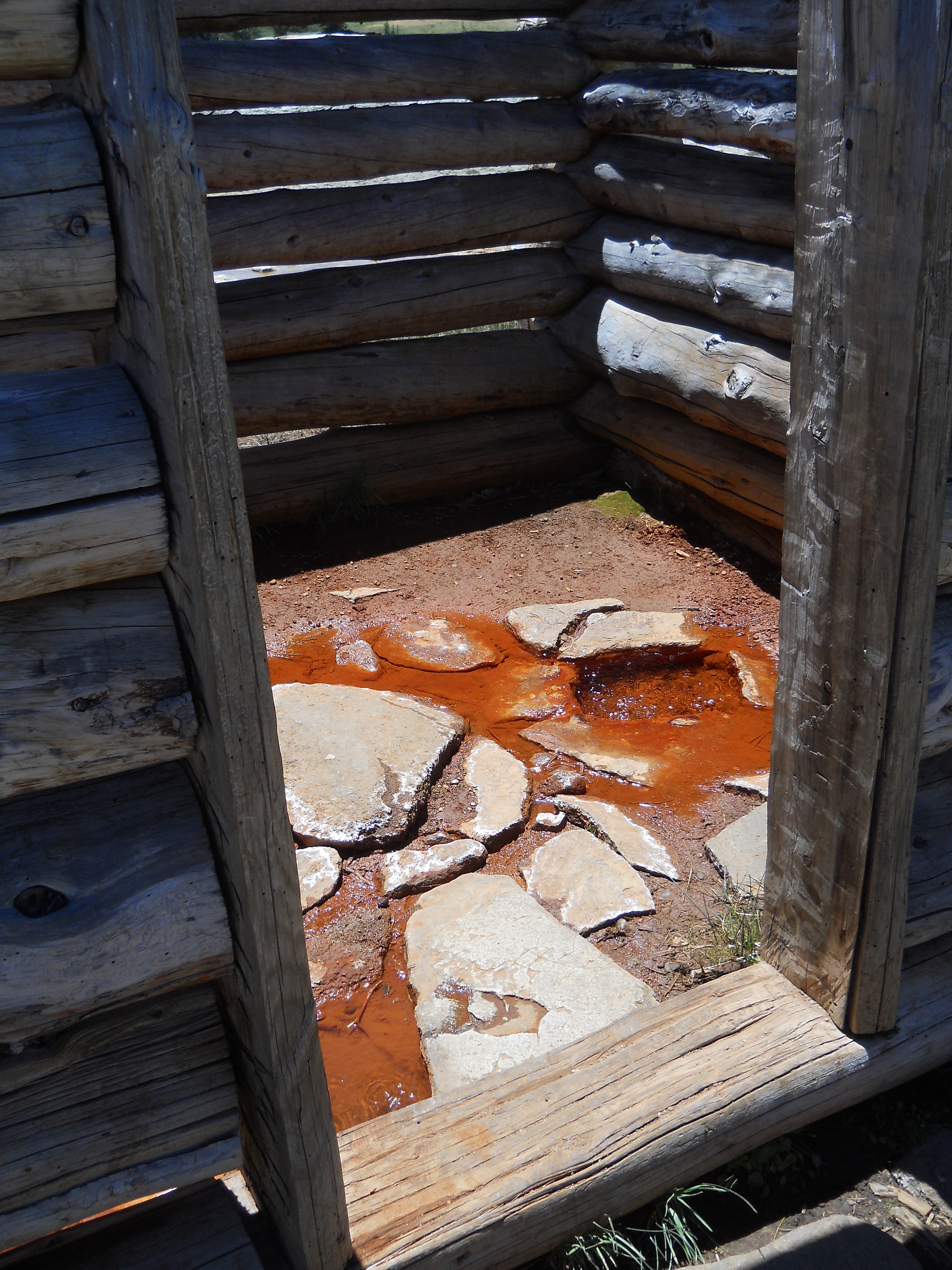
Interior of the cabin and spring

Lembert had spent his early life in New York and received a classical education reading Latin. He was murdered in his Cascade Creek cabin in the winter of 1896–1897 in a robbery. His obituary appeared in Entomological News. Lembert Dome was named in his memory. The McCauley Cabin is located on Lembert's former winter property. The Soda Springs property was inherited by Lembert's brothers who sold it to J.J McCauley in 1898. McCauley sold the Soda Springs property to the Sierra Club in 1912. The site was operated as a private campground for Sierra Club members until 1972, when the club signed over the land to the National Park Service. The Park Service operated the campground for the public until 1976, when it was closed down.

The cabin was listed on the National Register of Historic Places on April 19, 1979.
