= Purisima Creek Redwoods Open Space Preserve =

Preserve in Woodside, California, U.S.

- IUCN category V (protected landscape/seascape)
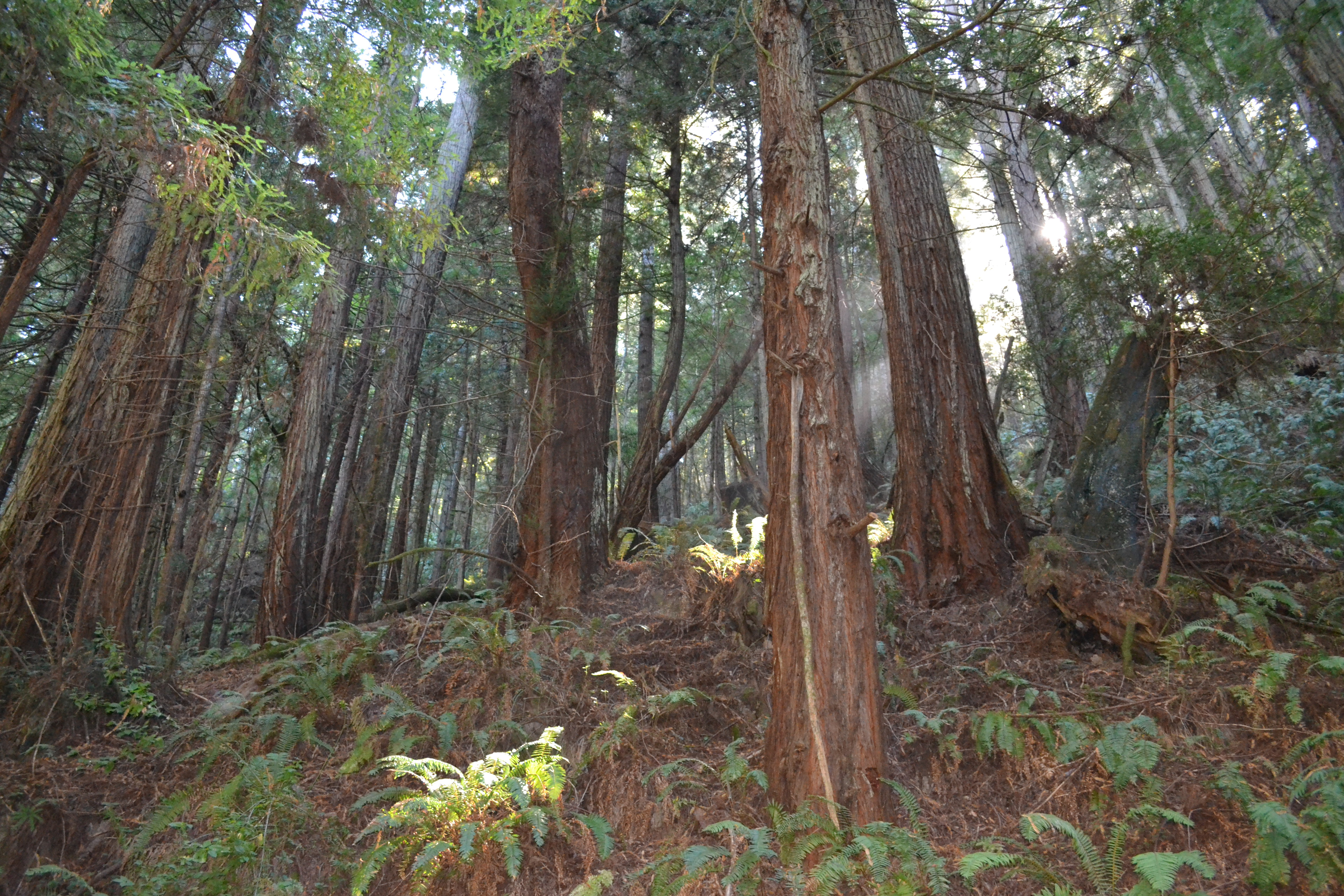
- Redwoods in the preserve

- Location within San Francisco Bay Area Location within California Location within the United States
- Location: San Mateo County, California, USA
- Nearest city: Half Moon Bay, California
- Coordinates: 37°26′15″N 122°20′45″W
- Area: 4,711 acres (19.06 km^{2})
- Governing body: Midpeninsula Regional Open Space District

The Purisima Creek Redwoods Open Space Preserve is located on the western slopes of historic Kings Mountain in Woodside, California. This 4,471-acre (1,809 ha) preserve was established with a $2 million gift from the Save the Redwoods League.

Purisima Creek and several of its tributaries flow through the preserve.

The main entrance for the Purisima Open Space is off the Skyline Boulevard section of State Route 35. The park is notable for its tall coastal redwoods, along with coastal scrub and hardwood forests of tanoak, madrones, and Douglas firs.

The preserve overlooks Half Moon Bay, and has over 21 miles (34 km) of trails for hiking, bicycling, and horseback riding. The popular Redwood Trail is wheelchair accessible. Like many parks in California, dogs are not allowed. The preserve is home to many species of animals, including bobcats, mountain lions, coyotes and rabbits.

The Purisima Open Space is part of the Midpeninsula Regional Open Space District, spanning over 50,000 acres (200 km^{2}) in the San Francisco Bay Area. Parking is available at the main entrance, 4.5 miles (7.2 km) south of Highway 92 on Skyline Boulevard.

== Photo gallery ==
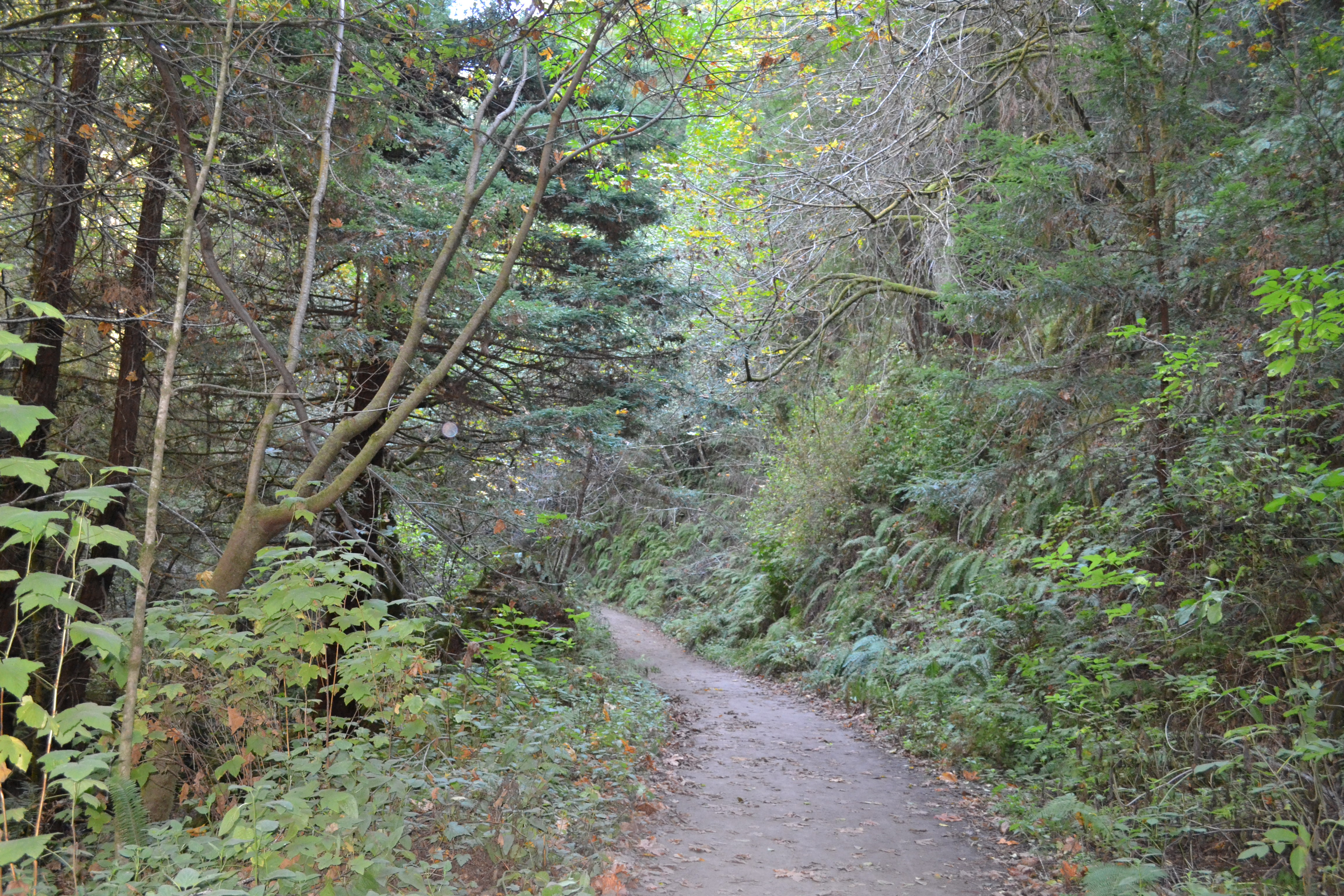
Purisima Creek Trail

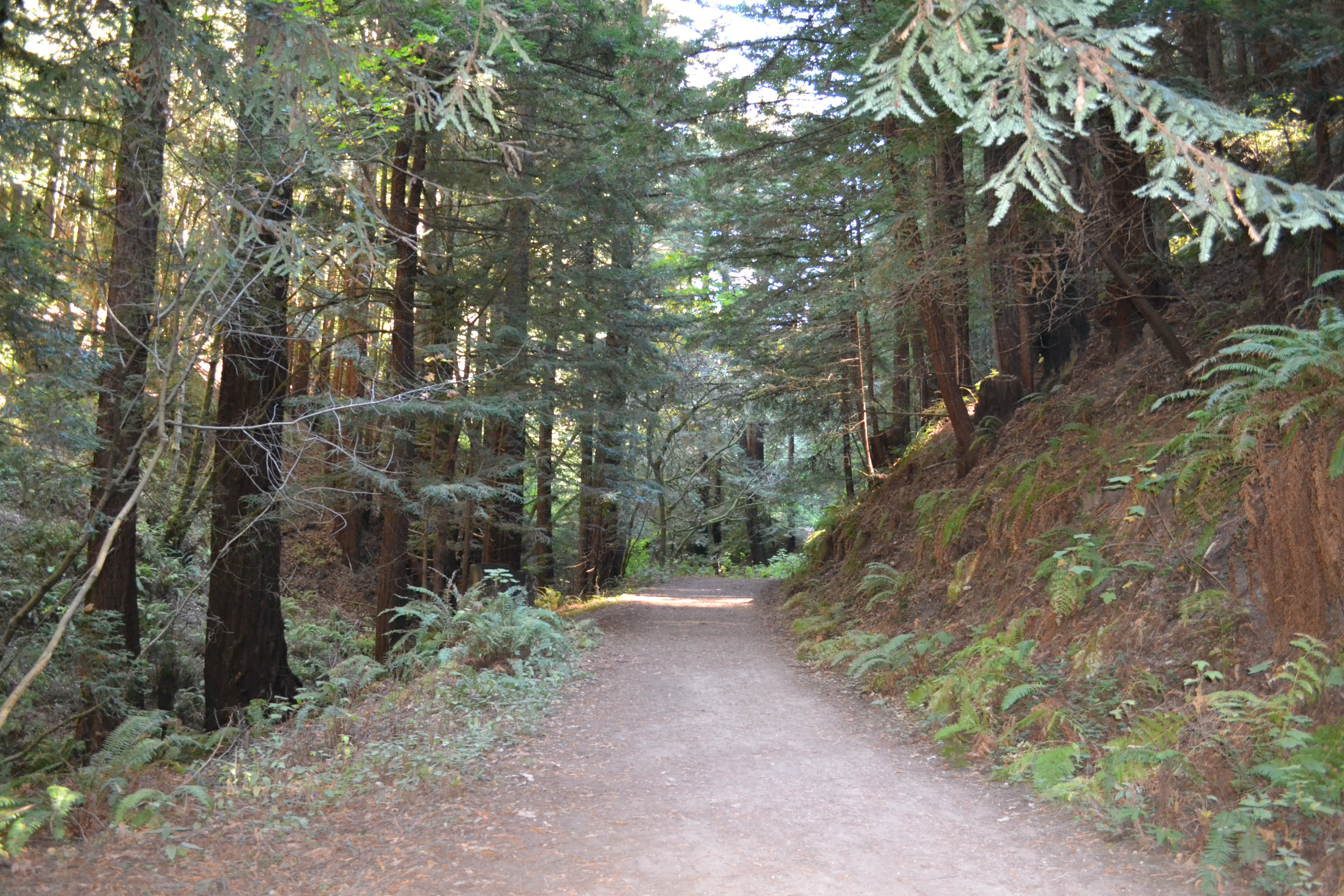
Another view of the trail

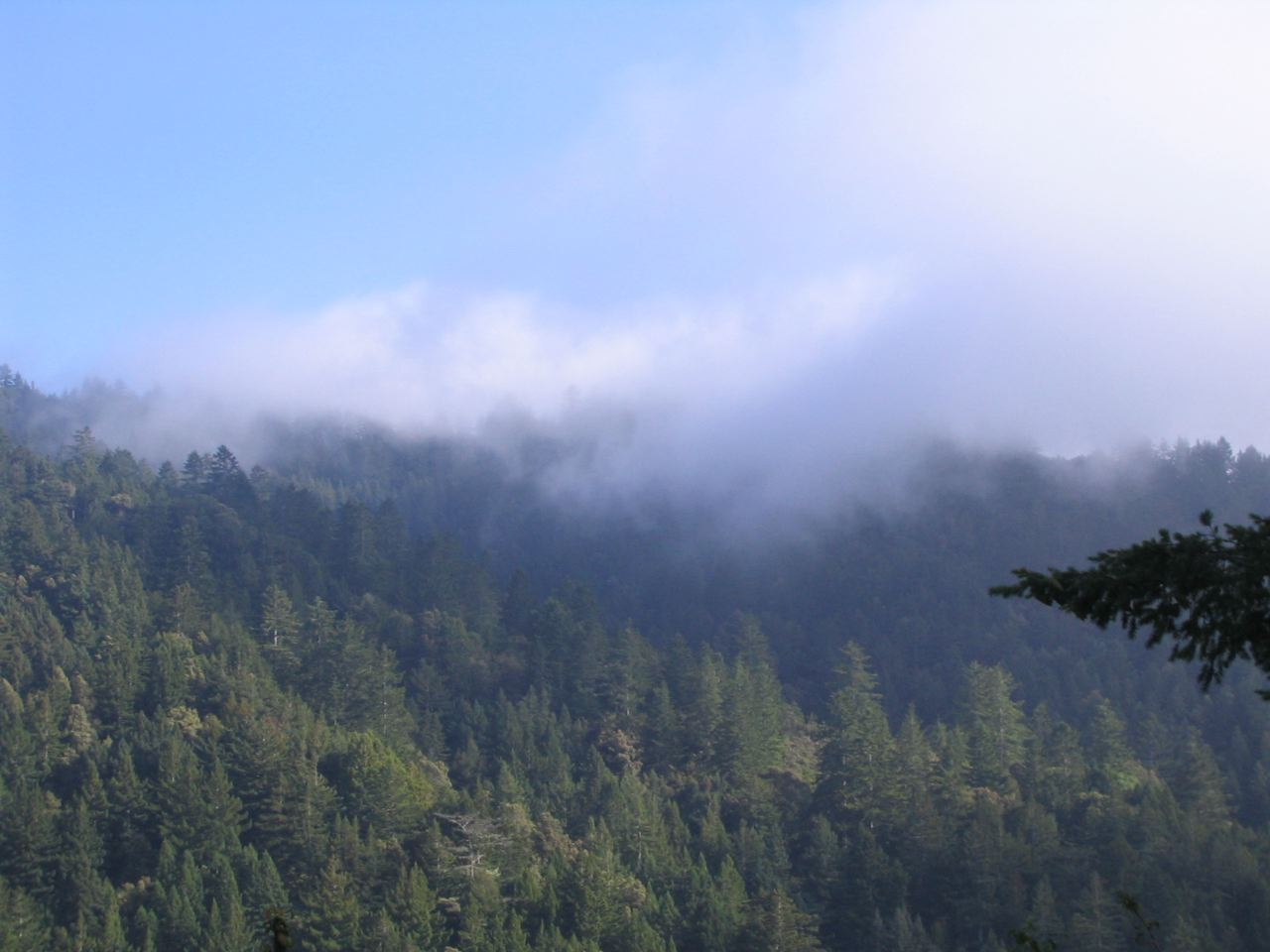
Vista

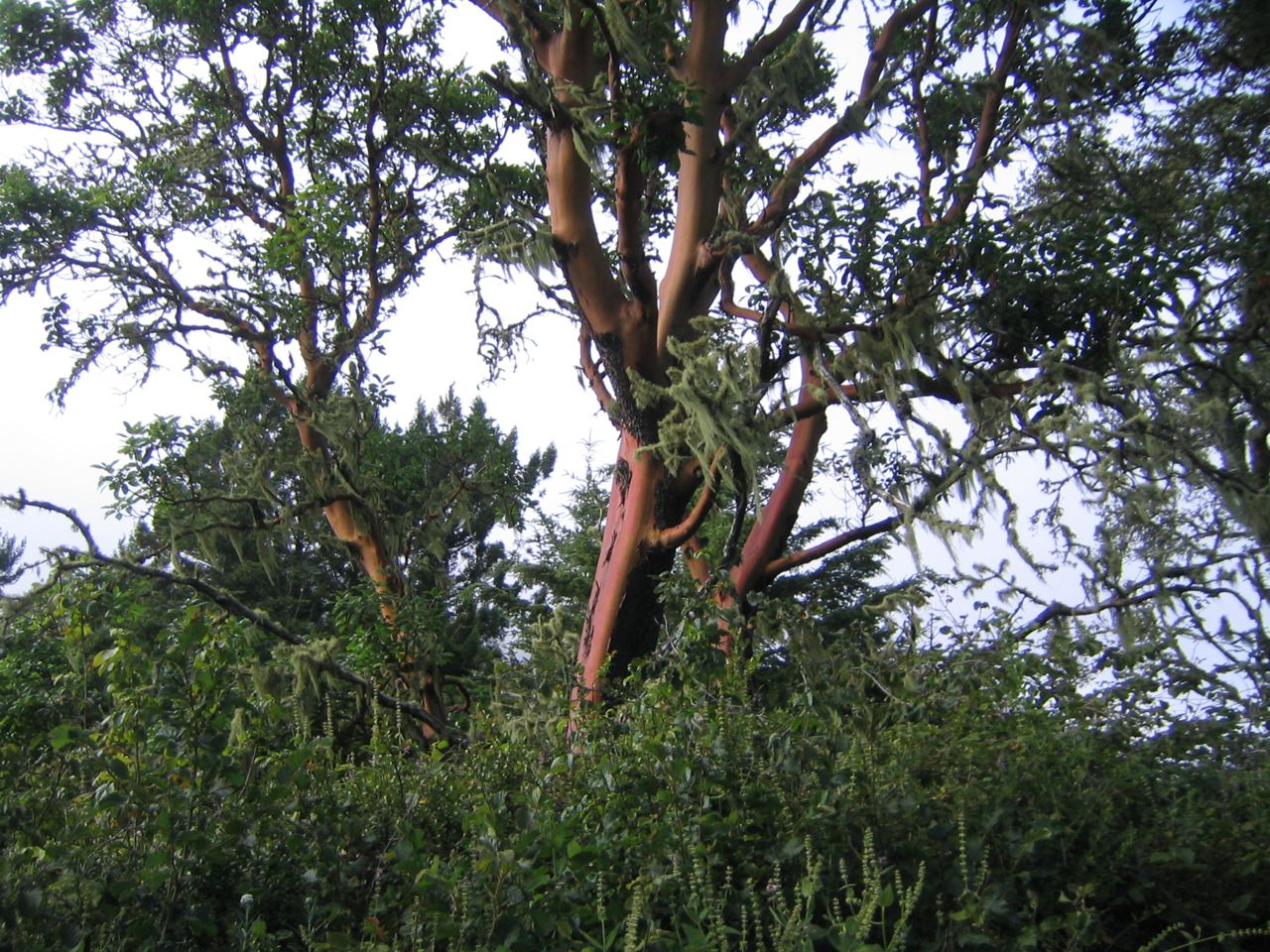
Pacific Madrone (Arbutus menziesii)

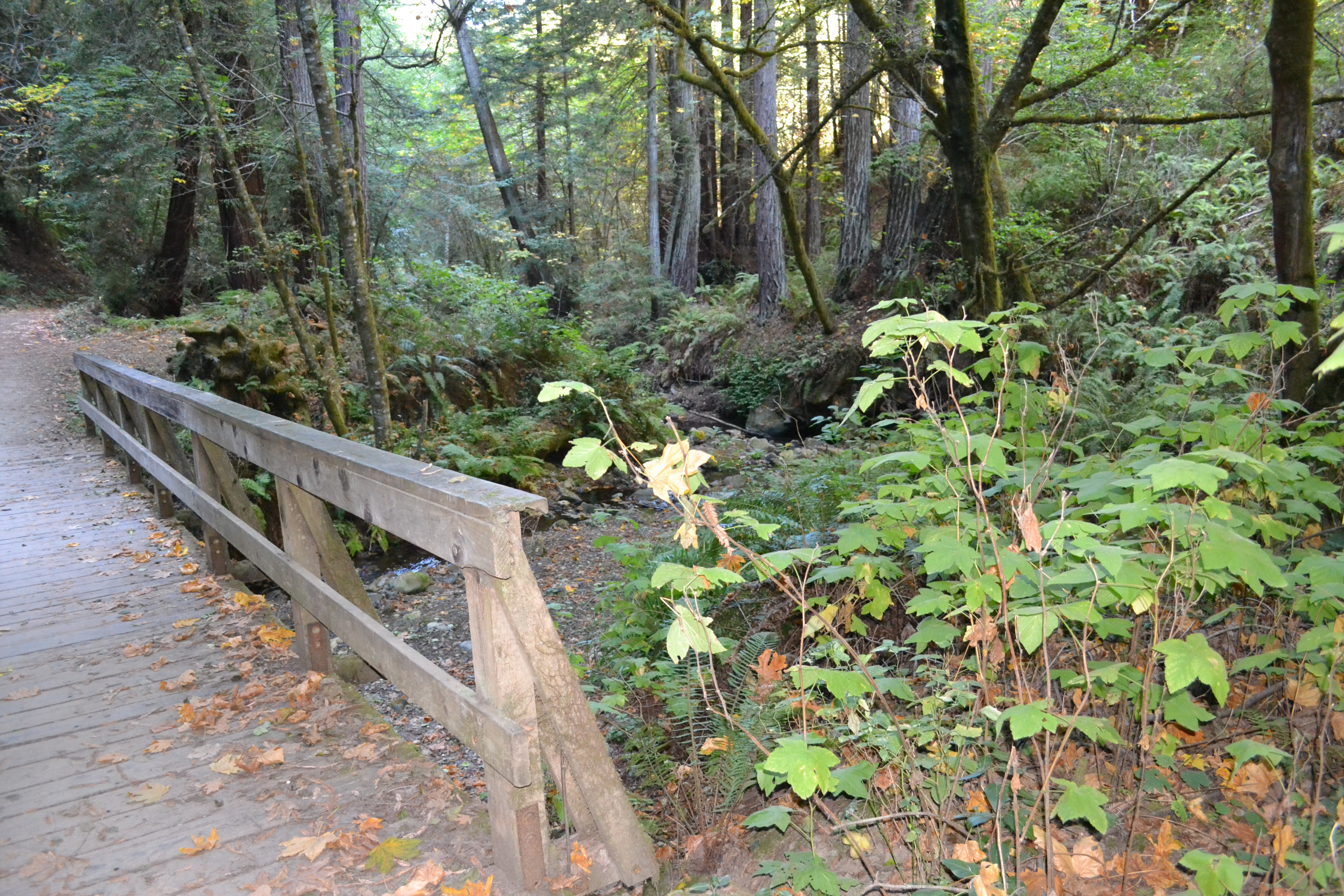
Footbridge along Purisima Creek Trail

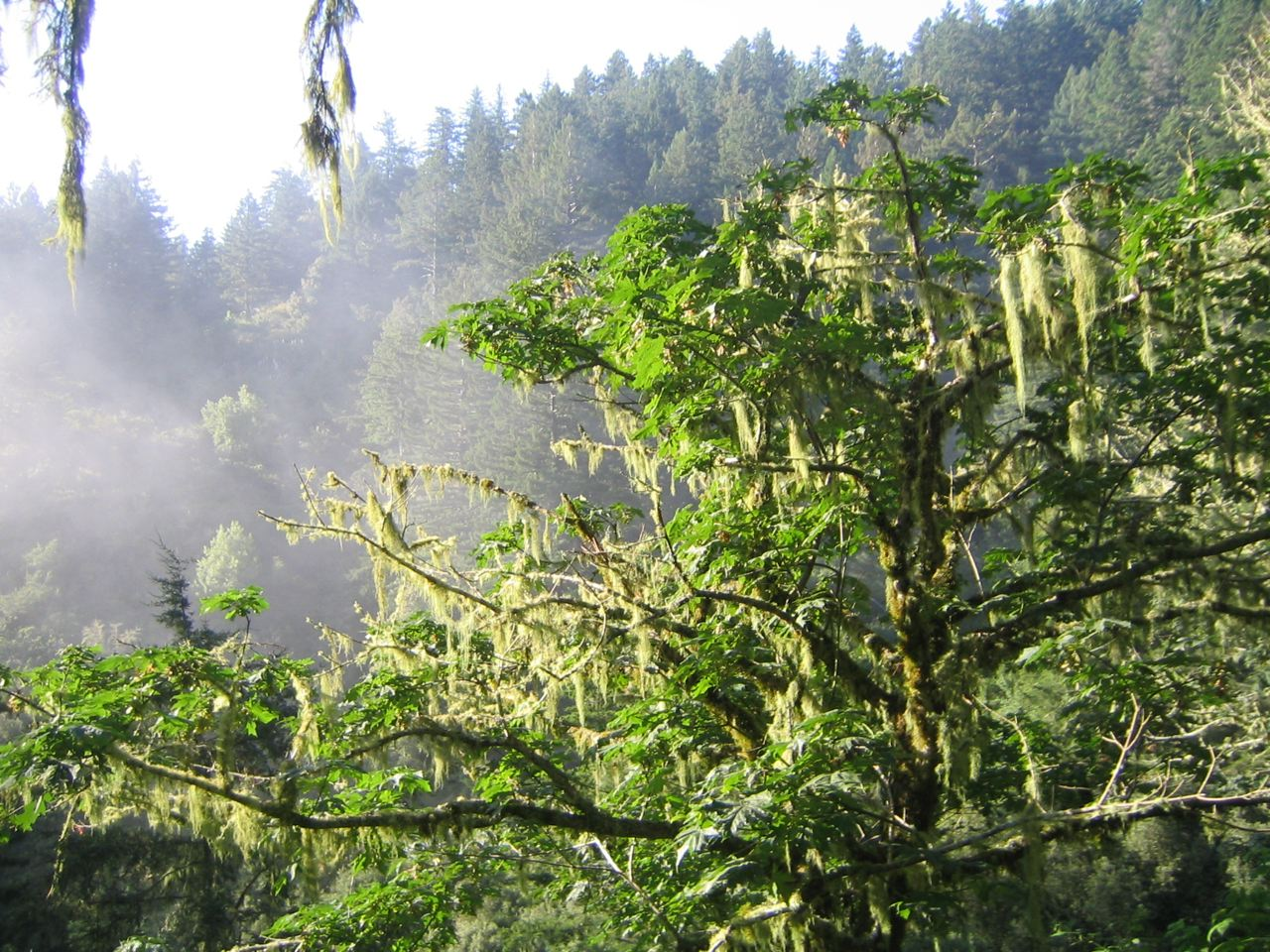
Bigleaf Maple (Acer macrophyllum)

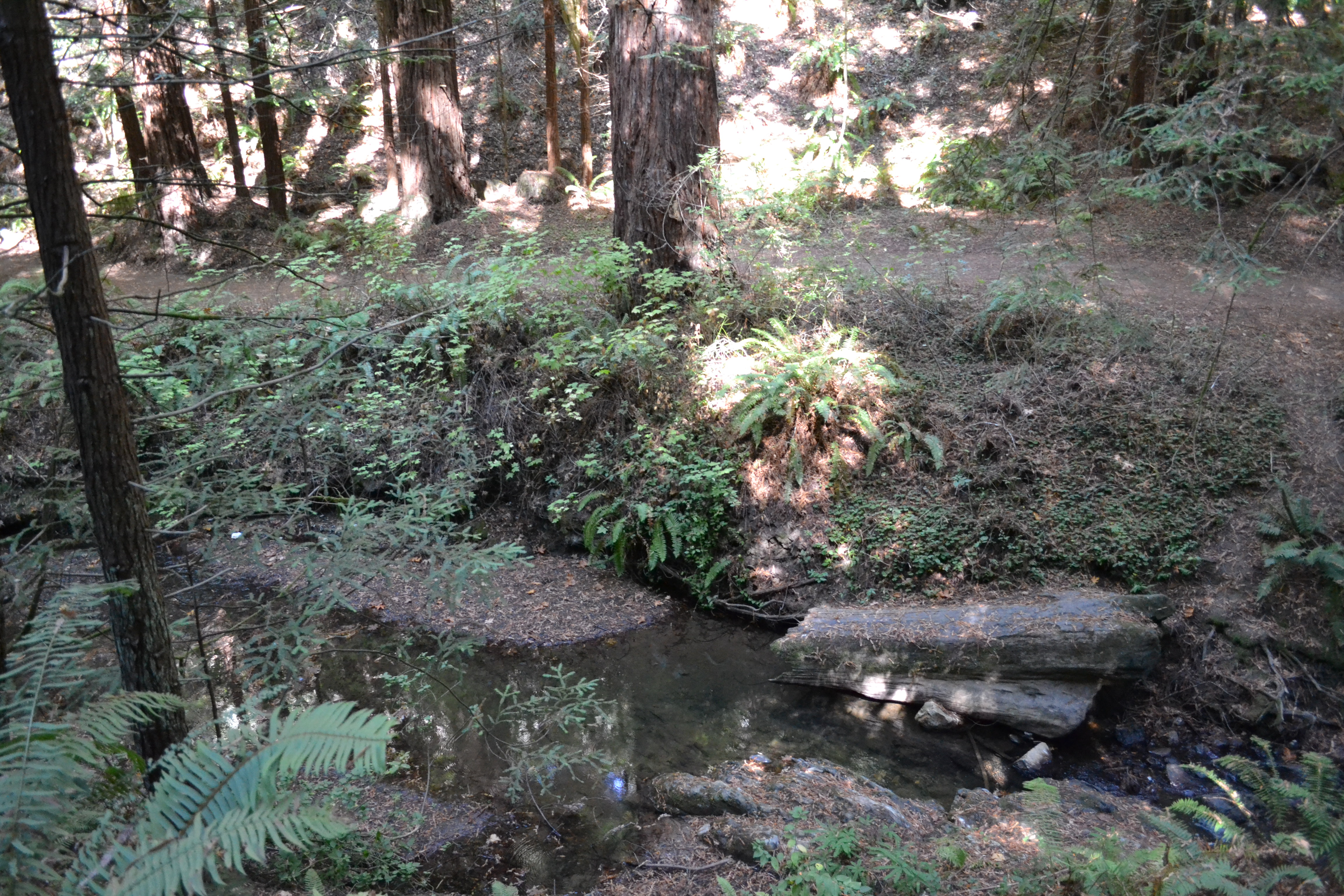
Purisima Creek

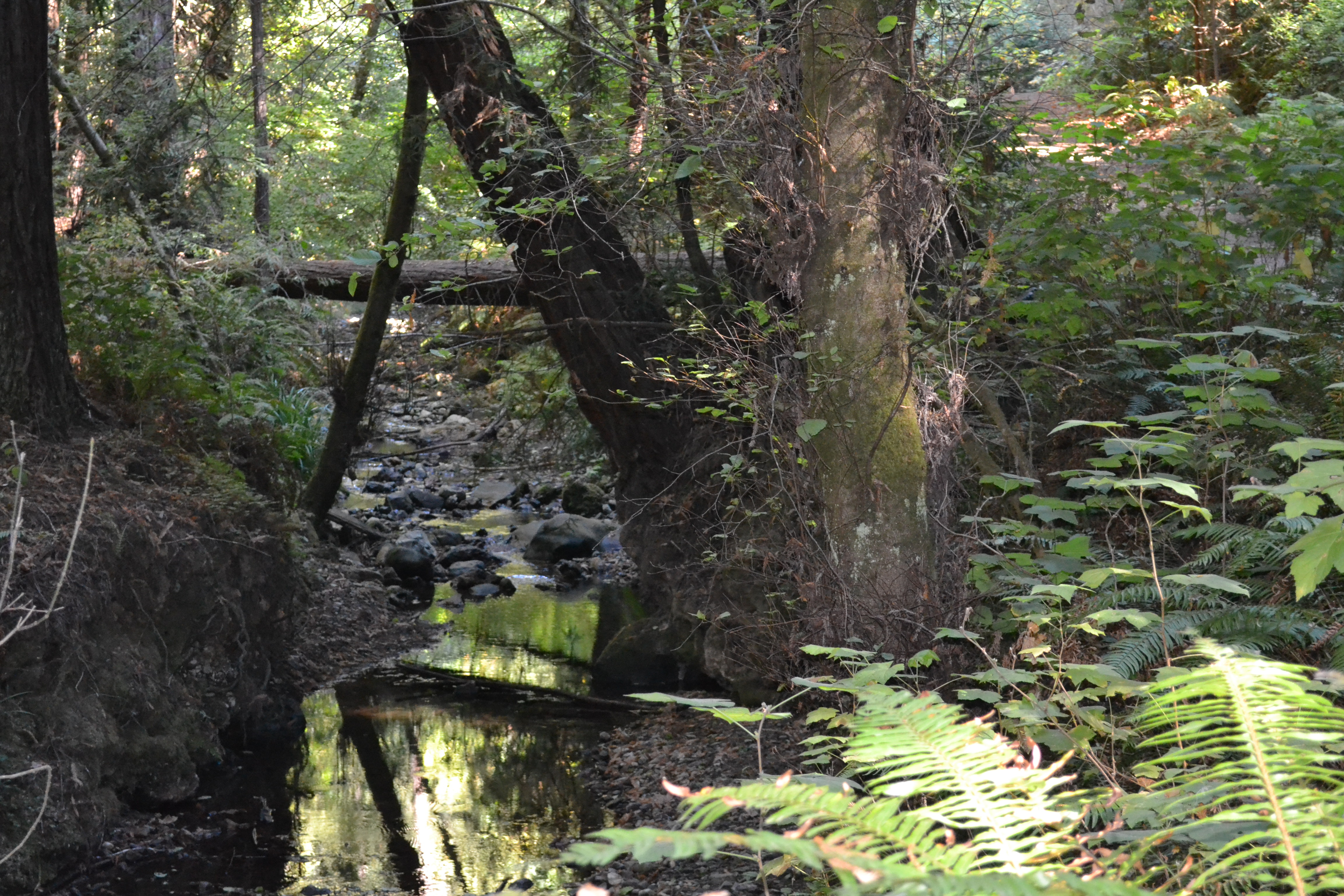
Another view of the creek

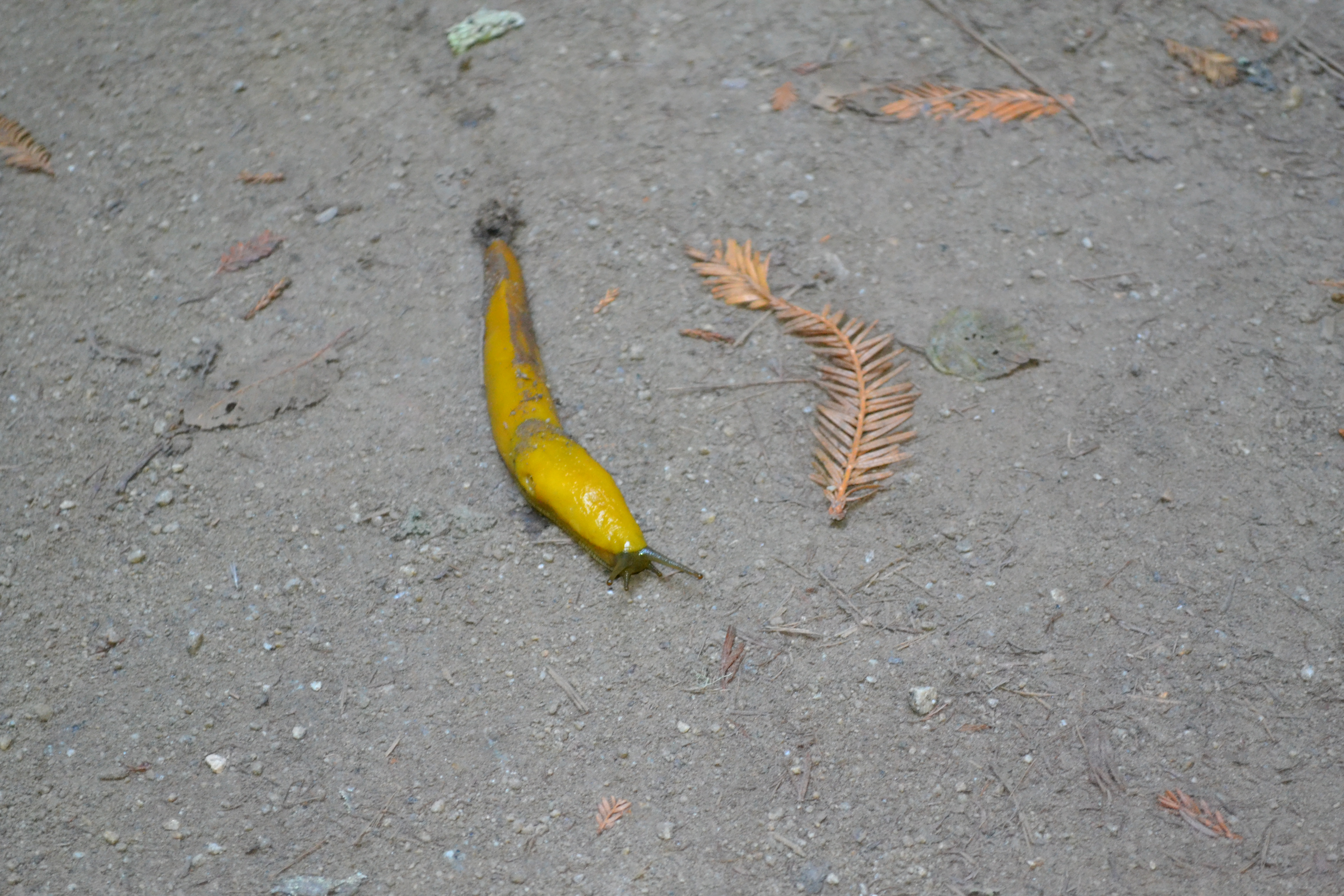
Banana slug on Purisima Creek Trail

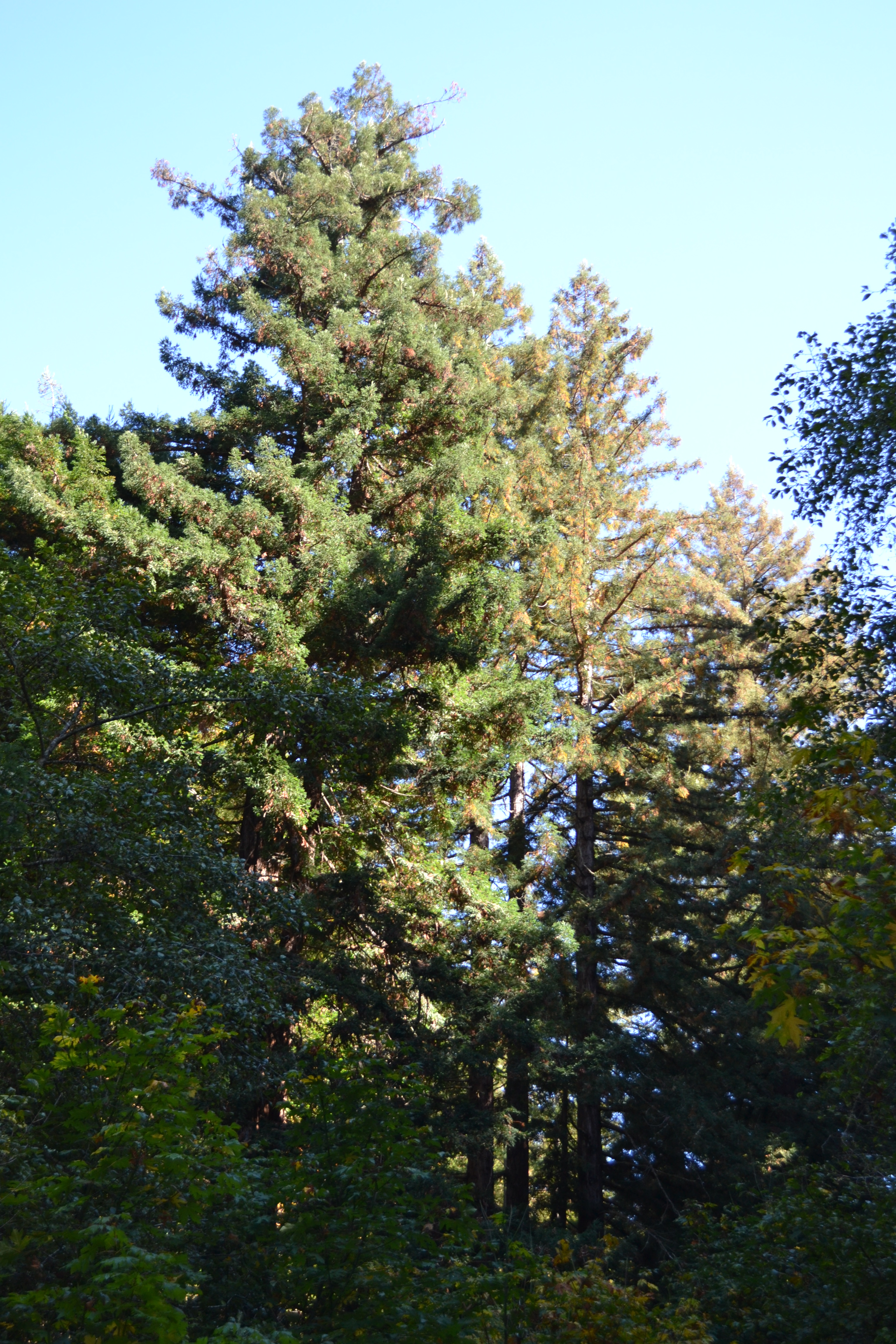
Tree canopies in the Preserve

== See also ==
- Midpeninsula Regional Open Space District areas
- Coast redwood groves
