= Soda Springs (Yosemite National Park) =

Mineral spring in California, United States

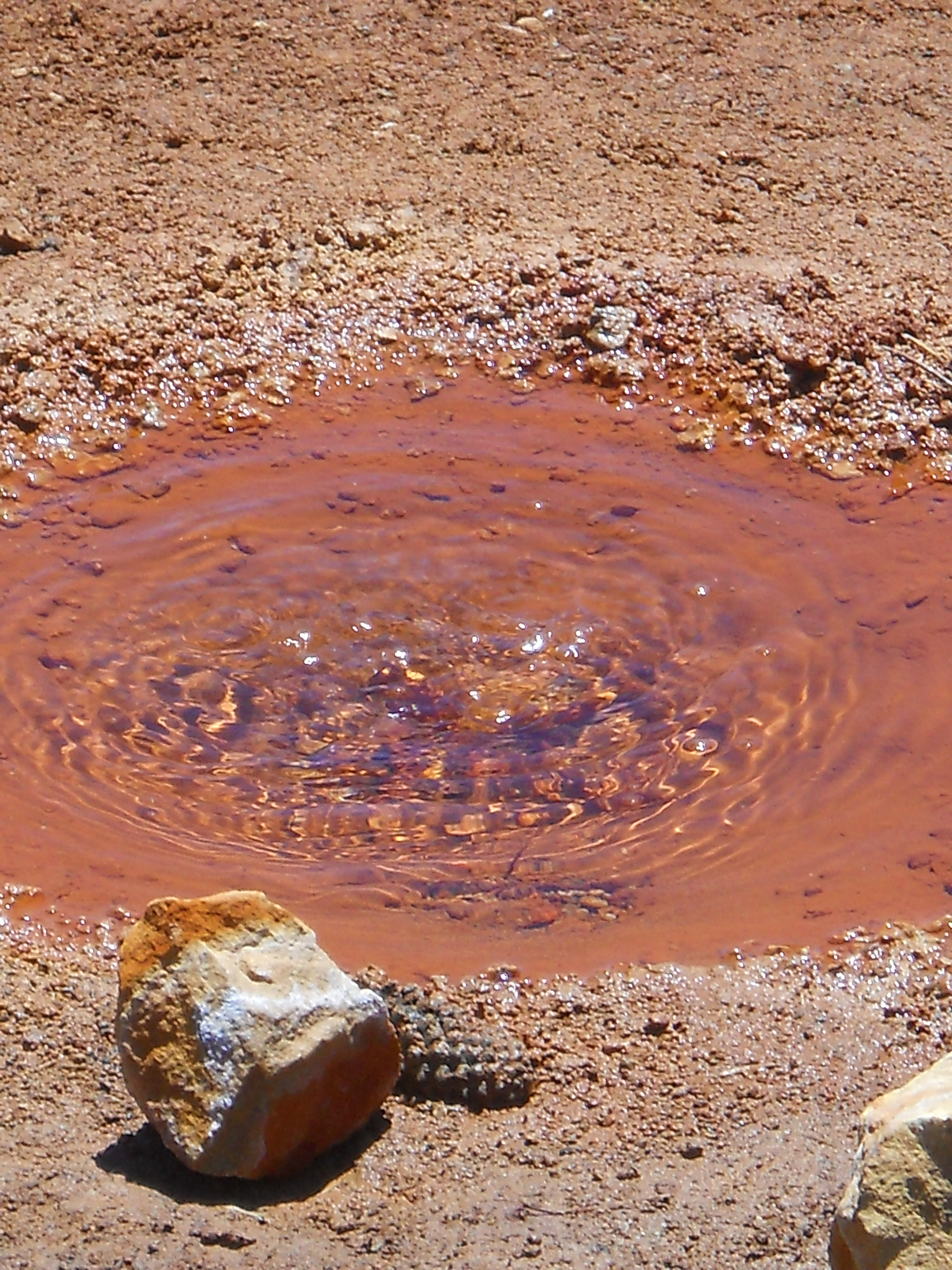
- Interactive map of Soda Springs
- Location: Tuolumne Meadows, Yosemite National Park, California
- Coordinates: 37°52′44.3″N 119°21′58.6″W
- Elevation: 8,600 feet (2,600 m)

Soda Springs is a set of mineral springs in Tuolumne Meadows, Yosemite National Park. The name is often used interchangeably with Soda Springs Cabin, a log cabin built over the springs.

== Partial history ==
The original inhabitants were Indigenous Americans, and in 1869, John Muir visited the area, grazing sheep. In 1885, John Baptiste Lembert made a seasonal homestead at Soda Springs, also filing a claim under the Homestead Act. In 1898, John McCauley used the homestead at Soda Springs as a seasonal pasture for his livestock. In 1915, The Sierra Club built Parsons Memorial Lodge at Soda Springs.
