= Soda Springs, Placer County, California =

Unincorporated community in the United States

Soda Springs
- Unincorporated community
- Location in California Soda Springs (the United States)
- Coordinates: 39°14′50″N 120°19′31″W
- Country: United States
- State: California
- County: Placer County
- Elevation: 6,047 ft (1,843 m)

Soda Springs (also, Berkeley Soda Springs and Summit Soda Springs) is a set of springs in Placer County, California that was in the 19th century once the location of a hotel and resort. Soda Springs is located on the North Fork of the American River, 2 miles (3.2 km) west of Tinker Knob, and 4 miles (6.4 km) north-northwest of Granite Chief. It lies at an elevation of 6047 feet (1843 m).

Serene Lakes, a pair of lakes spanning 77 acres (0.31 km2), is located in Soda Springs and Placer County.

A resort that operated at Soda Springs burned down in 1898.

== See also ==
- East Snow Mountain Falls
- Serene Lakes
