= Statement of Demonstrated Ability =

A Statement of Demonstrated Ability is a statement granted at the discretion of a Federal Air Surgeon to a person who is disqualified from obtaining a pilot's medical certification. It is granted only if the disqualifying condition or disease is static or non-progressive, and the person has been found capable of performing airman duties without endangering public safety.

A Statement of Demonstrated Ability does not expire and only authorizes a designated aviation medical examiner to issue a medical certificate of a specified class if the examiner finds that the medical condition described on its face has not adversely changed. In granting a Statement of Demonstrated Ability, the Federal Air Surgeon may consider the person's operational experience and any medical facts that may affect the ability of the person to perform airman duties.
