= Cascade–Siskiyou National Monument =

National monument in the United States

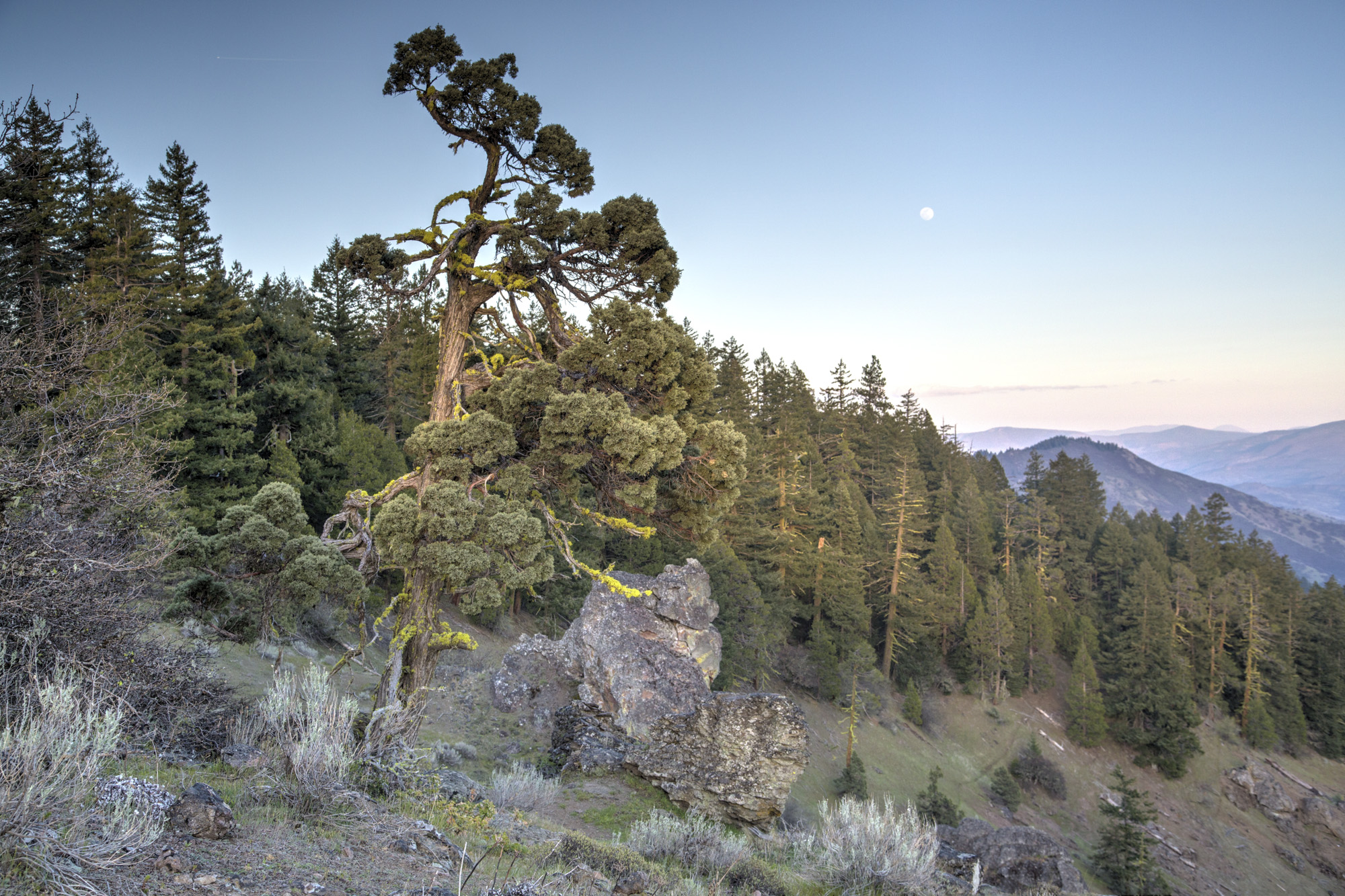
- Pacific Crest Trail at Cascade–Siskiyou

- Location within the United States
- Interactive map of Cascade–Siskiyou National Monument
- Location: Jackson County, Oregon and Siskiyou County, California, United States
- Nearest city: Ashland
- Coordinates: 42°04′40″N 122°27′40″W
- Area: 114,000 acres (460 km^{2})
- Established: June 9, 2000
- Governing body: Bureau of Land Management
- Website: Cascade–Siskiyou National Monument

The Cascade–Siskiyou National Monument is a United States national monument that protects 114,000 acres (46,134 ha) of forest and grasslands at the junction of the Cascade Range and the Siskiyou Mountains in Southwestern Oregon and Northwestern California, United States. The monument is managed by the Bureau of Land Management as part of the National Landscape Conservation System. It was established in a presidential proclamation by President Bill Clinton on June 9, 2000 and expanded by President Barack Obama on January 12, 2017.

== History ==
Native Americans are known from archaeological excavations to have inhabited the region for thousands of years. Nearly 100 dwelling and root-gathering sites belonging to the Modoc, Klamath, and Shasta tribes have been uncovered to date. By the 1880s, their lands were taken by white settlers, whose mining cabins still dot the region. Natural features in the monument include Pilot Rock, a volcanic neck or interior of an extinct volcano, similarly formed as Devils Tower in Wyoming, and the Soda Mountain Wilderness.

== Geography ==
=== Monument boundaries ===
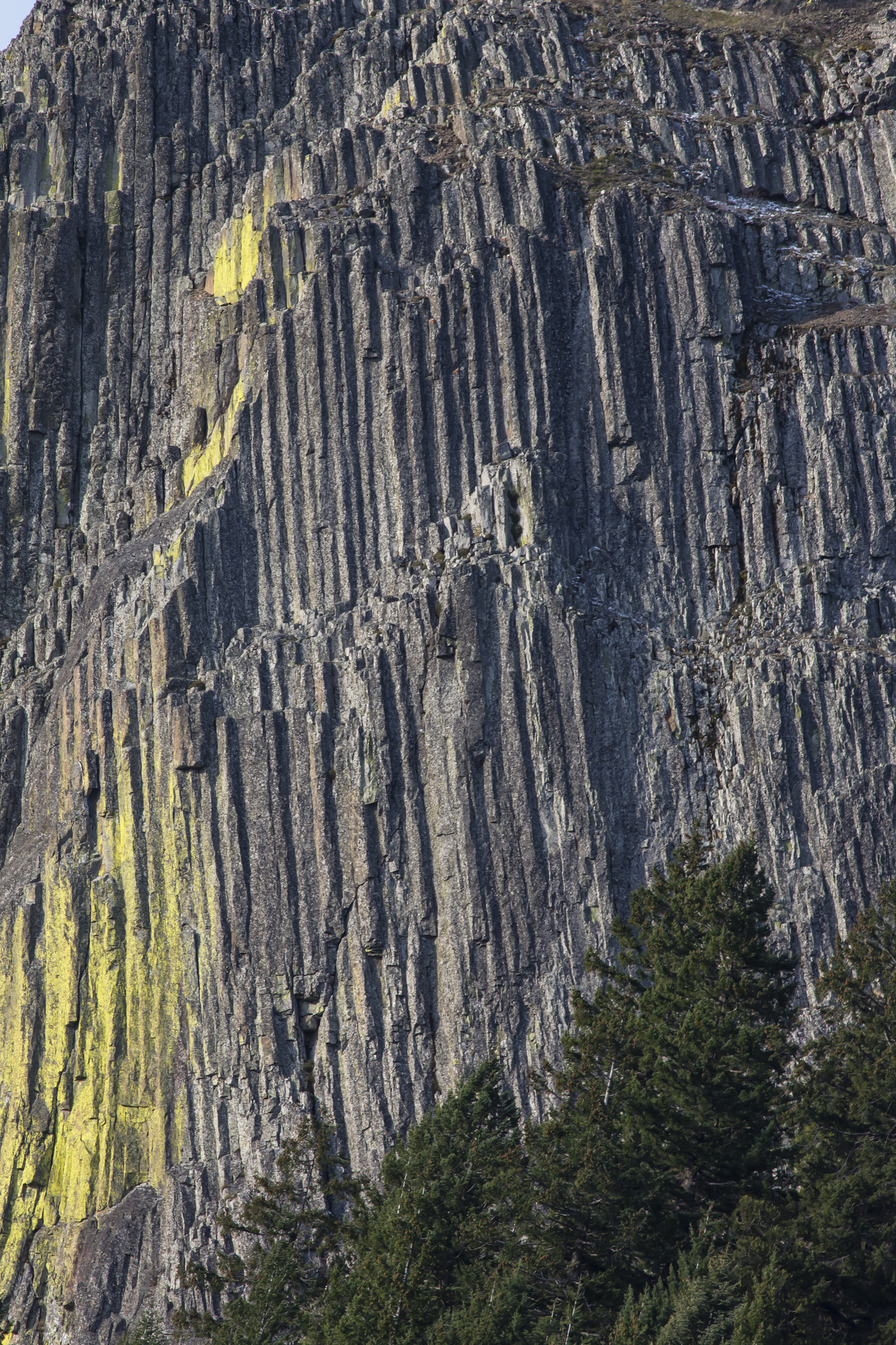
Columnar andesite at Pilot Rock, Oregon

The Pacific Crest Trail runs through the monument area. There is a fire lookout tower on the top of Soda Mountain built in 1962 to replace the original 1933 structure. Although the top of the mountain is also the site of dozens of television and radio broadcast and relay dishes, the view from the fire lookout of the surrounding mountains is unobstructed. From the lookout, one can see Mount Shasta, Mount Ashland, Mount McLoughlin, as well as on clear days, the rim of Crater Lake.

The Cascade–Siskiyou National Monument land use plan has been the source of local and national controversy over multi-use planning for wilderness and roadless areas. The plan currently strives for a balance between managing rare natural habitat, recreational activities, and agricultural activities including cattle grazing and timber. Numerous private land inholdings remain within the boundaries of the Monument. The Southern Oregon Land Conservancy holds a conservation easement on a 1,312-acre (531 ha) private property near Siskiyou Summit.

=== Expansion ===
In May 2015, 70 scientists endorsed the April 2011 Cascade–Siskiyou Scientific Report and the need for monument expansion bringing the total number of scientists speaking out on expansion to 85. Additionally, science-based expansion of the Cascade–Siskiyou National Monument is formally endorsed in writing by:

- The Ashland Chamber of Commerce board (June 2015)
- The Talent Chamber of Commerce board (July/August 2016)
- The Ashland City Council (June 2015)
- The Talent City Council (August 2016)
- The Mayor of Ashland (March /July 2016)
- The Mayor of Talent (August 2016)
- Oregon State Representative Peter Buckley (July 2015)
- Oregon State Senator Alan Bates (August 2015; deceased August 2016)
- Private landowners accounting for over 14,000 acres (5,700 ha) within the general scientists' recommended monument expansion area (2015 and 2016)

The monument expansion is opposed by the Boards of Commissioners of Jackson County and Klamath County (both in Oregon); and the Siskiyou County Board of Supervisors (in California). A group of local people calling themselves the "No Monument Tribe" opposes the monument in its entirety, both the initial establishment and the expansion.

On January 12, 2017, President Barack Obama expanded the monument by 48,000 acres (19,000 ha). The expansion contains 5,000 acres (2,000 ha) in Northern California, in addition to 43,000 acres (17,000 ha) in Oregon.

Federal judges in Washington, DC and Oregon issued conflicting decisions in 2019 over the legality of the expansion into O&C Lands. In 2023 both the 9th and DC Circuit Courts of Appeals upheld the expanded national monument designation. The Supreme Court declined to take up the two decisions in 2024.

== Flora and fauna ==
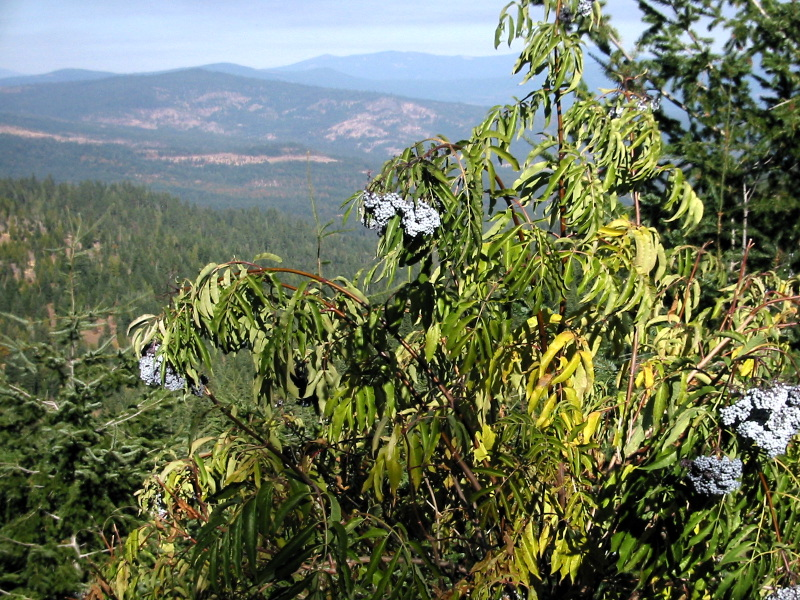
Blue elderberry in the monument

The Cascade–Siskiyou National Monument is the first U.S. national monument set aside solely for the preservation of biodiversity. It has one of the most diverse ecosystems found in the Cascade Range. Two hundred species of birds are known to exist in the monument including some threatened and endangered species. Amphibians found in the National Monument include the rough-skinned newt.

Cascade–Siskiyou National Monument is noted for its significant botanical diversity. The range of elevations and diversity of habitat types provides for a spectacular flora that includes many endemics to the immediate Siskiyou crest area, such as Green's mariposa lily (Calochortus greenei). The federally endangered Gentner's fritillary (Fritillaria gentneri) is known to occur in the monument.

== See also ==
- List of national monuments of the United States
