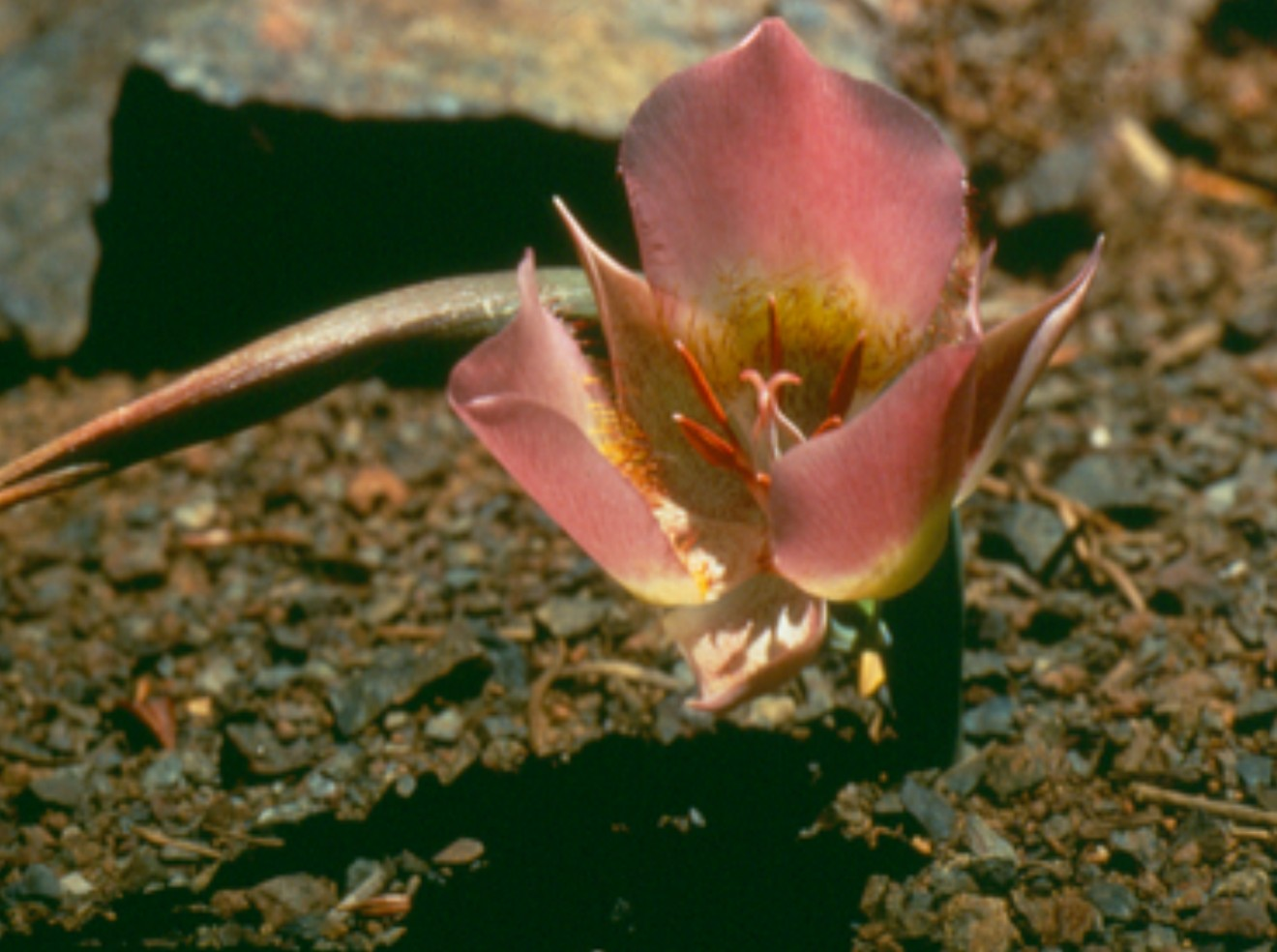

Conservation status
- Imperiled (NatureServe)

Scientific classification
- Kingdom: Plantae
- Clade: Tracheophytes
- Clade: Angiosperms
- Clade: Monocots
- Order: Liliales
- Family: Liliaceae
- Genus: Calochortus
- Species: C. persistens

Binomial name
- Calochortus persistens Ownbey

= Calochortus persistens =

Species of tree

Calochortus persistens is a rare North American species of flowering plant in the lily family known by the common name Siskiyou mariposa lily. It is native to northern California and southern Oregon.

Calochortus persistens grows at about nine sites scattered on the Gunsight-Humbug Ridge in Siskiyou County, California; in several locations on Cottonwood Peak and Little Cottonwood Peak, also in Siskiyou County; and in one population of just a few individuals on Bald Mountain near Ashland in Jackson County, Oregon,

Calochortus persistens grows on rocky slopes in acidic soils and talus. This is a perennial herb producing an unbranching stem around 10 centimeters tall. There is generally one basal leaf about 20 centimeters long which persists in flowering, and one smaller leaf higher up on the stem. The inflorescence is a pair of erect, bell-shaped flowers with pinkish-purple sepals and petals 3.5 to 4 centimeter in length. The petals have bright yellow hairs near the bases. The fruit is a winged capsule about a centimeter long.

Threats to this rare species include invasive species, wildfire suppression, and construction and maintenance of roads and radio towers. The non-native noxious weed dyer's woad (Isatis tinctoria) directly competes with the mariposa lily by monopolizing water and nutrients and producing allelopathic substances which inhibit its germination. Fire suppression efforts at the California sites have resulted in overgrowth of native trees and shrubs such as Oregon-grape (Mahonia aquifolium) and curl-leaf mountain mahogany (Cercocarpus ledifolius), which shade out small wildflowers such as mariposa lilies.
