= Soda Gulch =

Valley in California, United States

Coordinates: 37.4338290°N 122.3449712°W

Soda Gulch is a valley in San Mateo County, California. It contains a small stream which is a tributary of Purisima Creek.

== See also ==
- List of watercourses in the San Francisco Bay Area
