= Soda Mountain Wilderness =

Protected natural area in the U.S. state of Oregon

- IUCN category Ib (wilderness area)
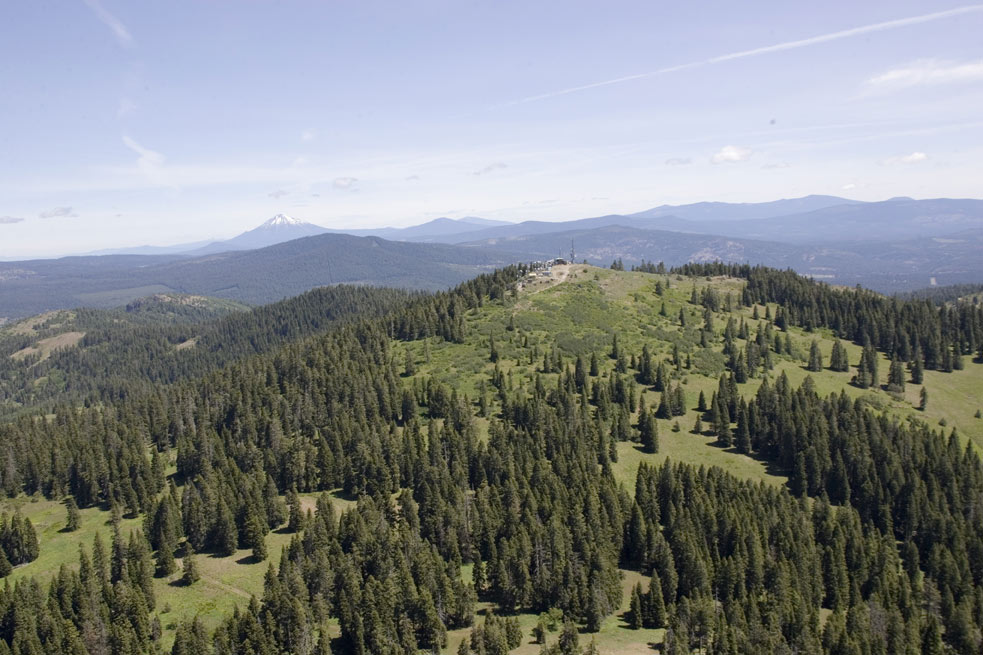
- Soda Mountain and its wilderness area

- Location within the United States
- Location: Jackson County, Oregon, United States
- Nearest city: Ashland, Oregon
- Coordinates: 42°02′12″N 122°27′45″W
- Area: 24,100 acres (9,753 ha)
- Established: 2009
- Governing body: U.S. Bureau of Land Management

The Soda Mountain Wilderness is a protected wilderness area inside the Cascade–Siskiyou National Monument located in the U.S. state of Oregon adjacent to the California state border. The wilderness area was created by the Omnibus Public Land Management Act of 2009, which was signed into law by President Barack Obama on March 30, 2009. The wilderness encompasses many mountains, including Boccard Point.

== See also ==
- List of Oregon Wildernesses
- List of U.S. Wilderness Areas
- Wilderness Act
