= Soda Springs (near Boonville), Mendocino County, California =

Unincorporated community in the United States

Soda Springs
- Unincorporated community
- Location in California Soda Springs (the United States)
- Coordinates: 39°01′27″N 123°18′57″W
- Country: United States
- State: California
- County: Mendocino County
- Elevation: 1,388 ft (423 m)

Soda Springs (also, Soda Spring and Singleys Soda Spring) is a spring in Mendocino County, California. It is located 5 miles (8 km) northeast of Boonville, at an elevation of 1388 feet (423 m).
