= Rancho San Gregorio =

Mexican land grant in California

Coordinates: 37.350°N 122.330°W

Rancho San Gregorio was a 17,783-acre (71.97 km^{2}) Mexican land grant in present day San Mateo County, California given in 1839 by Governor Juan Alvarado to Antonio Buelna. At the time, the grant was in Santa Cruz County; an 1868 boundary adjustment gave the land to San Mateo County. The rancho extended from Tunitas Creek in the north to the mouth of Pomponio Creek and encompassed San Gregorio, California, San Gregorio State Beach and La Honda

== History ==
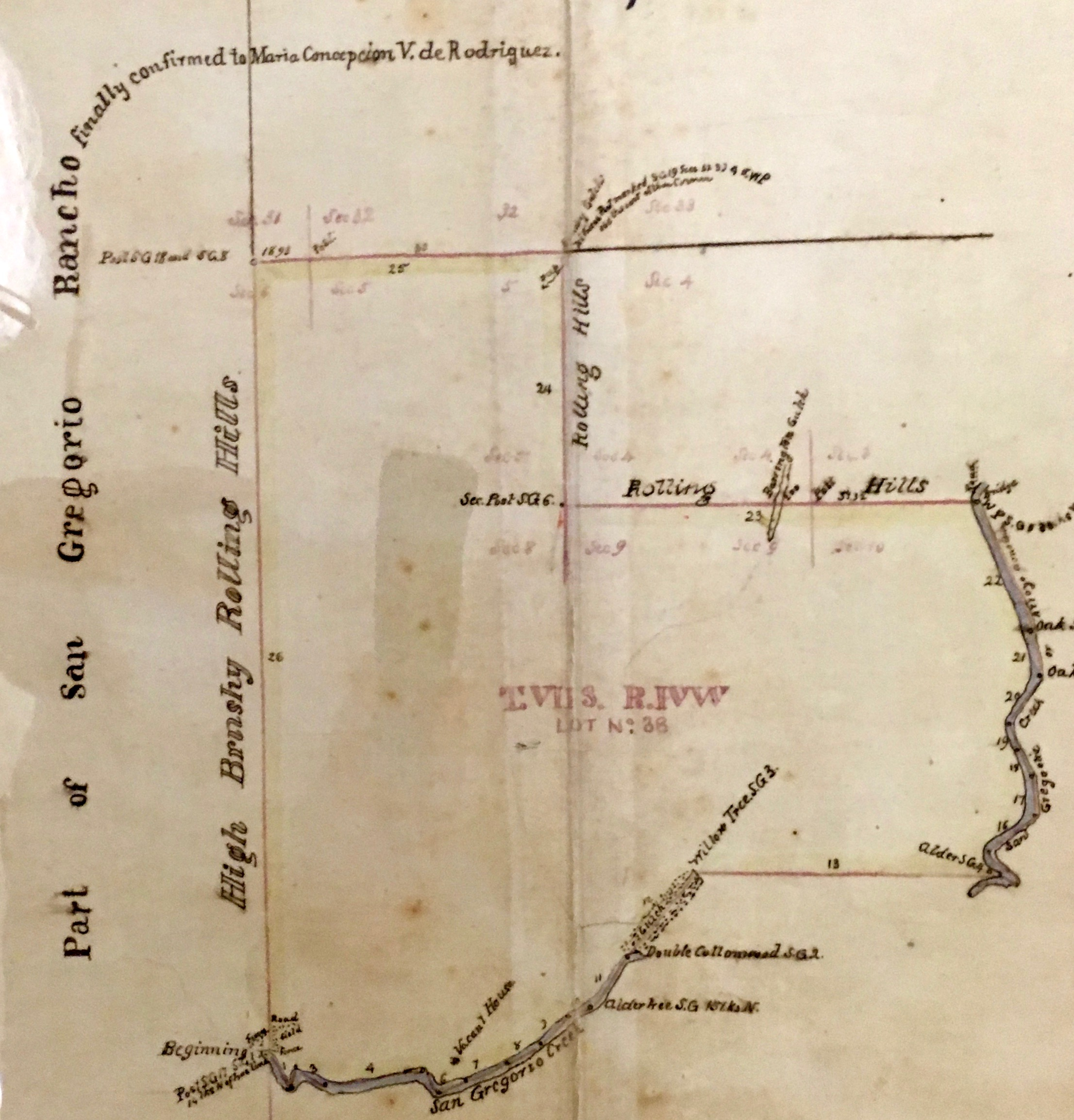
Grant to Maria Concepcion Valencia de Rodriguez

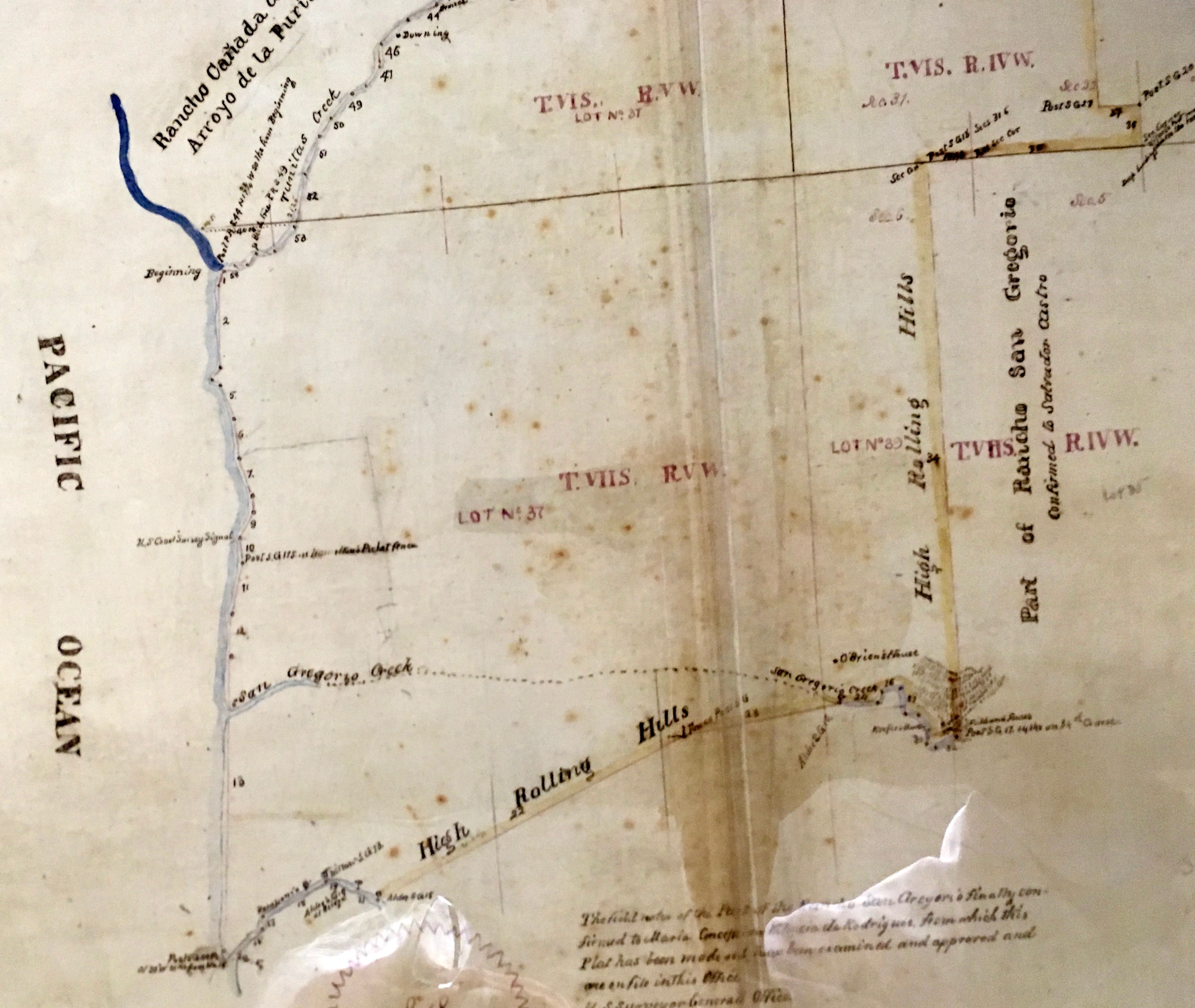
Document to confirm grant to Salvador Castro

Antonio Jose Buelna (1790–1846), son of José Antonio Buelna (1754–1821) married Maria Concepción Valencia (b.1798) in 1816. In 1836, José Castro, Juan Alvarado, Antonio Buelna, and José Antonio de la Guerra (son José de la Guerra y Noriega) signed the demand that Governor Nicolás Gutiérrez resign. In addition to the four square league Rancho San Gregorio grant, Alvarado granted Antonio Buelna Rancho San Francisquito in Santa Clara County in 1839. Buelna built a road, known today as La Honda Road and Old La Honda Road, over the hills connecting his two ranchos.

Buelna in 1842, made a will by which he left to his wife, Maria Concepción Valencia, Juan Bautista Buelna, and three others, each an undivided one-fifth share of the rancho. After Antonio Buelna died in 1846, María Concepción Valencia married Francisco Rodriguez, a widower and grantee of Rancho Arroyo del Rodeo. In 1849, María Concepción Valencia de Rodríguez sold a one square league of the eastern portion of Rancho San Gregorio to Salvador Castro.

With the cession of California to the United States following the Mexican-American War, the 1848 Treaty of Guadalupe Hidalgo provided that the land grants would be honored. Separate claims for Rancho San Gregorio, required by the Land Act of 1851, were presented by the widow of Buelna and Salvador Castro for their respective portions of Rancho San Gregorio.

A claim was filed for three square leagues by Encarnación Buelna de Rodríguez and heirs of María Concepción Valencia de Rodríguez with the Public Land Commission in 1853, but was rejected on the grounds there was no proof that the Maria Concepcion Valencia Rodriguez, was the heir of the original grantee. On appeal, the District Court confirmed the grant and the San Gregorio (Rodriguez) grant was patented to at 13,344 acres (54.0 km^{2}) in 1861.

A claim was filed by Salvador Castro for one square league with the Land Commission in 1852 and confirmed in 1856. However, the 1857 official survey of Castro's land gave him more than the Land Commission thought he should to have, the surplus being taken from the lands of the United States. Castro appealed his case to the US Supreme Court, but lost. The San Gregorio (Castro) grant was patented at 4,439 acres (18.0 km^{2}) in 1861.

Juan Bautista Buelna died in 1846 with two surviving children (Maria Louisa Buelna and Juan Baptiste Buelna). Maria Louisa Buelna and Juan Baptiste Buelna sold 4,000 acres (16.2 km^{2}) to Hugh Hamilton in 1866, and then sold their one fifth interest in the rancho to William Trenouth. A land title case was brought before the San Francisco Superior Court in 1872, and continued for another ten years.
