= La Honda Creek =

La Honda Creek Arroyo Hondo
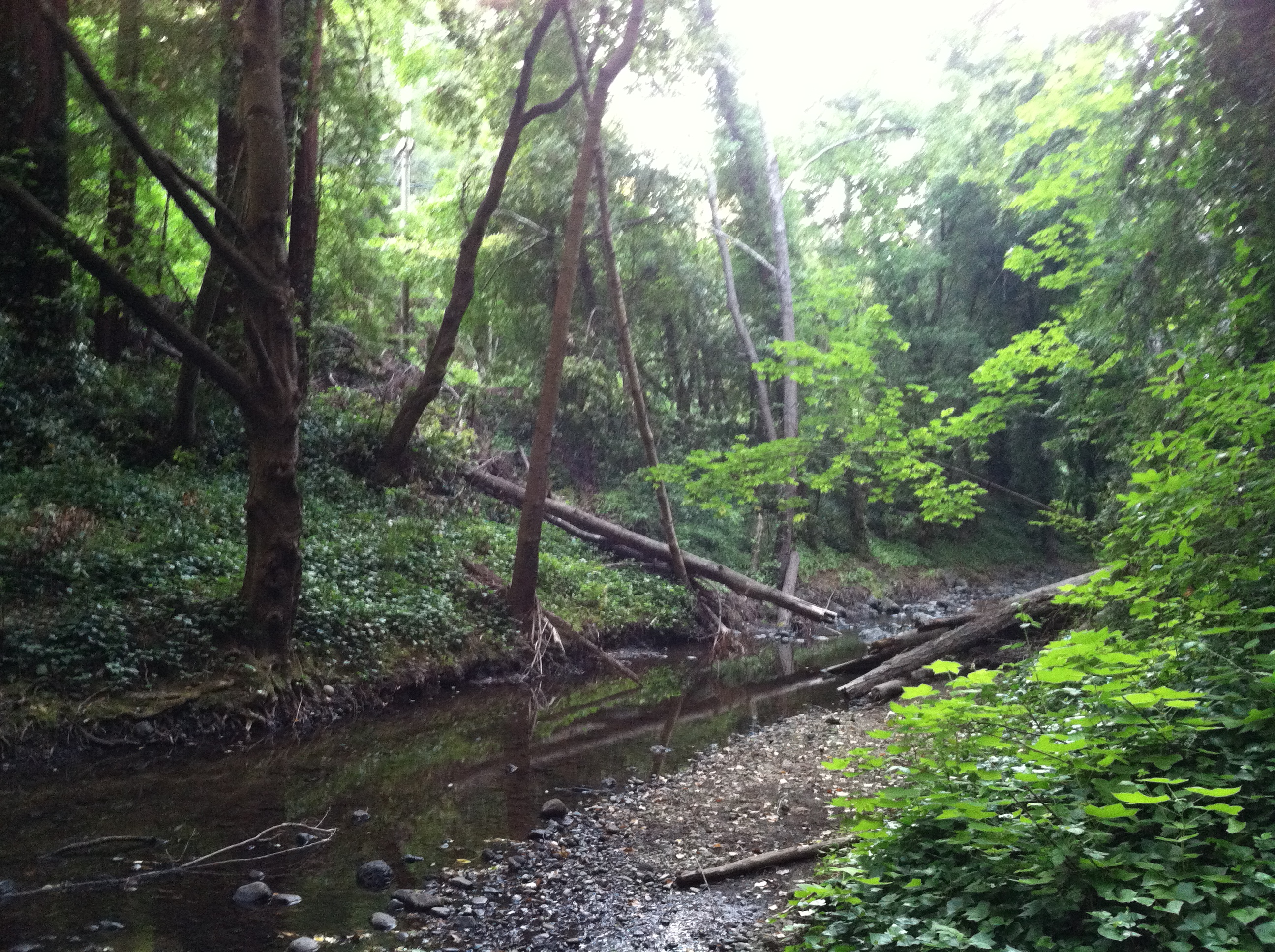
- La Honda Creek flows through Play Bowl in La Honda, California

- Location of the mouth of La Honda Creek at its confluence with Alpine Creek

Location
- Country: United States
- State: California
- Region: San Mateo County

Physical characteristics
- Source: Western slope of the Santa Cruz Mountains
  - location: near Allen Lookout, San Mateo County, California
- Source confluence
  - location: La Honda, California, San Mateo County, United States of America
  - coordinates: 37°19′45″N 122°16′58″W
  - elevation: 320 ft (98 m)
- Mouth: Pacific Ocean
  - location: San Gregorio, California
  - coordinates: 37°18′36″N 122°16′37″W
  - elevation: 0 ft (0 m)

Basin features
- Tributaries
  - left: Alpine Creek
  - right: La Honda Creek, Harrington Creek, Bogess Creek, El Corte de Madera Creek, Clear Creek, Coyote Creek

La Honda Creek is a 7 miles (11 km) long stream on the Pacific slope of the Santa Cruz Mountains and is a tributary of San Gregorio Creek. From its source (37°23′32″N 122°17′30″W) near Bear Gulch Road and Skyline Boulevard (CA 35) in San Mateo County, California, La Honda Creek's water flow south to its confluence with Alpine Creek to form San Gregorio Creek in La Honda, and thence to the Pacific Ocean.

== History ==
The Spanish historic name for La Honda Creek was Arroyo Hondo, meaning "deep stream". The creek was listed as Arroyo Ondo on several diseños on the Mexican land grants and as Arroyo Hondo on the 1856 Rancho Cañada de Raymundo map.

== Watershed and Course ==
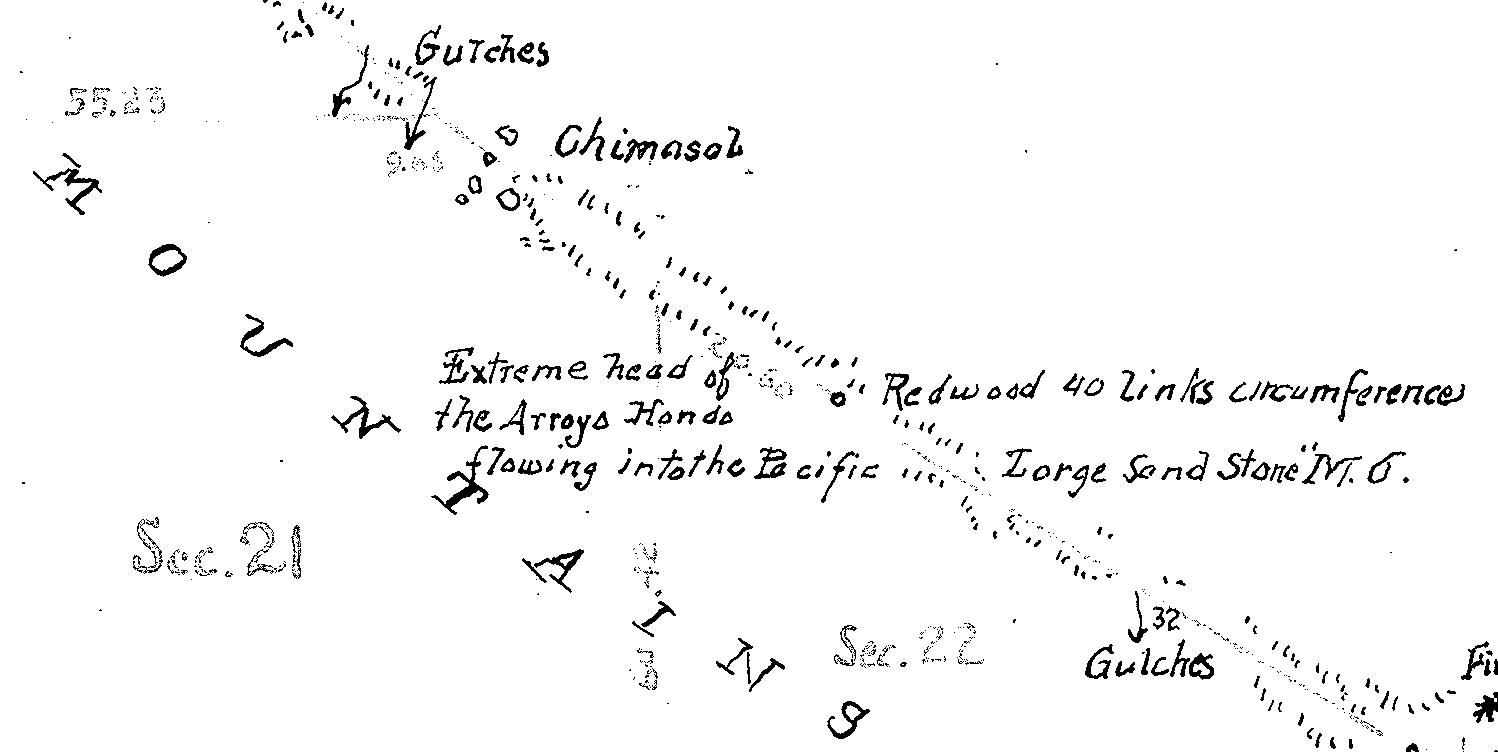
Portion of Rancho Cañada de Raymundo map showing La Honda Creek headwaters in 1856

The La Honda Creek watershed drains 12.3 square miles (32 km^{2}). A large part of the creek's upper watershed is in La Honda Creek Open Space Preserve.

California State Route 84 (CA 84) follows the valley of the creek from Sky Londa to San Gregorio.

Four named tributaries, Woodhams, Langley, Woodruff and Weeks Creeks, flow into La Honda Creek.

== Ecology ==
The La Honda Creek watershed has been documented as historically supporting a salmonid population, including steelhead trout (Oncorhynchus mykiss) and potentially coho salmon (Oncorhynchus kisutch), however sediment eroding into the creek coupled with natural logjams present barriers to fish passage. A 1985 California Department of Fish and Wildlife survey reported steelhead up to 2 miles (3.2 km) upstream of Weeks Creek, the highest named tributary, and reported that La Honda Creek provides good spawning and rearing habitat for steelhead downstream of Woodruff Creek, and resident rainbow trout (the landlocked form of steelhead trout) upstream of Woodruff Creek.

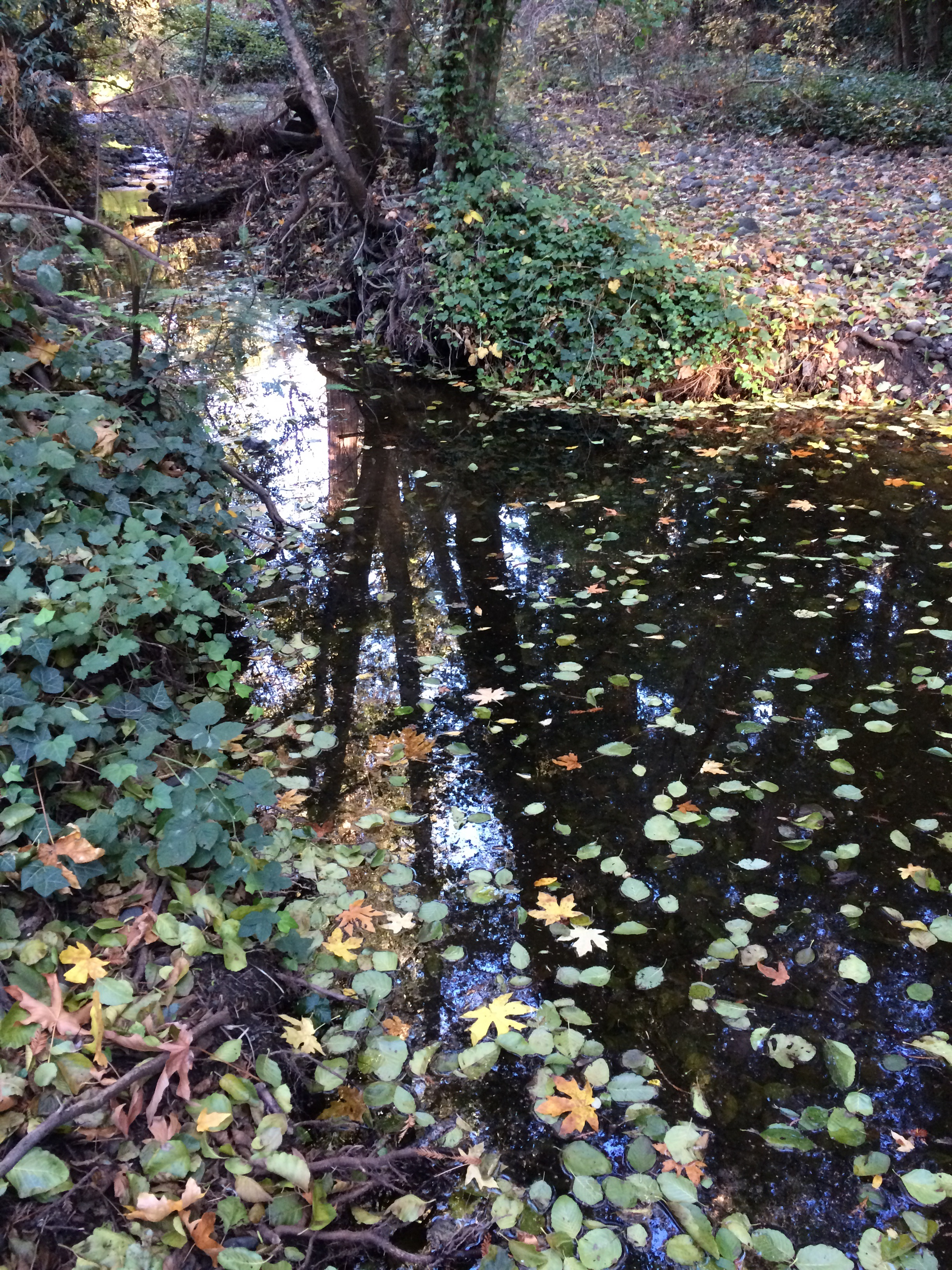
The creek in November 2015, at the end of California's dry season.

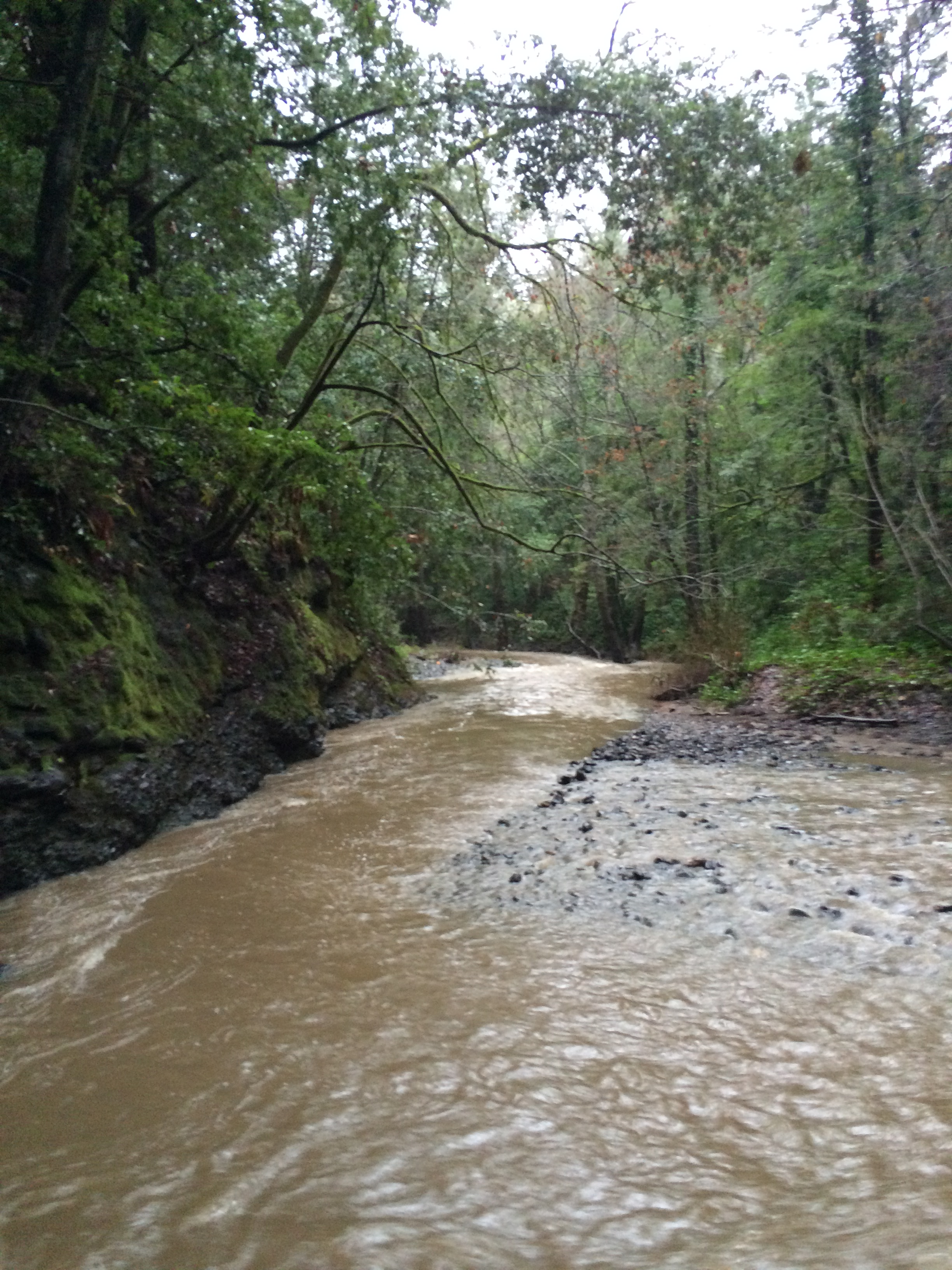
The creek in January 2016, during the wet season.

== See also ==
- List of watercourses in the San Francisco Bay Area
