= Pine Tree Gulch =

Valley in California, United States

Coordinates: 37°21′04″N 122°20′02″W

Pine Tree Gulch is a valley in San Mateo County, California near Bellvale. It contains a small stream which is a tributary of San Gregorio Creek. The stream flows about 0.5 miles (1 km) from its source to its confluence with El Corte de Madera Creek.
