= Woodhams Creek =

River in California, United States

Coordinates: 37°19′26″N 122°16′21″W

Woodhams Creek is a small river in San Mateo County, California and is a tributary of San Gregorio Creek. It flows about 2 miles (3 km) from its source on Langley Hill to its confluence with La Honda Creek, in the town of La Honda.
