= Bellvale =

Bellvale may refer to:

- Bellvale, California, unincorporated community in San Mateo County, California
- Bellvale, New York, wooded hamlet in Warwick, New York
- Bellvale Mountain, mountain range near Bellvale, New York

== See also ==
- Bell Vale, Liverpool
