= Weeks Creek =

River in California, United States

Coordinates: 37.346052°N 122.274135°W

Weeks Creek is a small creek tributary to La Honda Creek, which in turn is a tributary to San Gregorio Creek in western San Mateo County, California. San Gregorio Creek drains to the Pacific Ocean at San Gregorio State Beach. The San Gregorio Creek watershed supports several species listed under the federal and State of California Endangered Species Acts. These species include—coho salmon (endangered), steelhead (threatened), Tidewater Goby, San Francisco Garter Snake, and California Red-legged frog.

There is another Weeks Creek in the Pescadero Creek watershed of western San Mateo County, which is known for a large landslide/

== See also ==
- List of watercourses in the San Francisco Bay Area
