= Rancho San Francisquito =

Mexican land grant in California

Coordinates: 37.440°N 122.170°W

Rancho San Francisquito was a 1,471-acre (5.95 km^{2}) Mexican rancho or land grant in present-day Santa Clara County, California given in 1839 by Governor Juan Alvarado to Antonio Buelna. The grant was located on the southwest side of San Francisquito Creek and today encompasses northern part of the Stanford University campus. Neighboring ranchos included Rancho Rincon de San Francisquito to the south, and Rancho de las Pulgas to the north, on the other side of San Francisquito Creek. The boundary between Ranchos San Francisquito and de las Pulgas would later define part of the border between Santa Clara and San Mateo Counties. Rancho San Francisquito was commonly known as the Rancho of Palo Alto to avoid confusion with the adjoining Ranchos Rinconada del Arroyo de San Francisquito and Rincon de San Francisquito.

== History ==
Antonio Jose Buelna (1 September, 1790–14 November, 1842), son of José Antonio Buelna (1754–1821), married Maria Concepción Valencia (b.1798) in 1816. In 1836, José Castro, Juan Alvarado, Antonio Buelna, and José Antonio de la Guerra (son José de la Guerra y Noriega) signed a demand that Governor Nicolás Gutiérrez resign. Buelna was granted Rancho San Francisquito and Rancho San Gregorio by Alvarado in 1839. When Antonio Buelna died in 1842, María Concepción Valencia married Francisco Rodriguez, a widower and grantee of Rancho Arroyo del Rodeo.

With the cession of California to the United States following the Mexican-American War, the 1848 Treaty of Guadalupe Hidalgo provided that the land grants would be honored. As required by the Land Act of 1851, a claim for Rancho San Francisquito was filed with the Public Land Commission in 1853, and the grant was patented to María Concepción Valencia de Rodriquez in 1868.

By the early 1850s squatters, including Mr. Julian, William J. Little, Thomas Bevins, Jerry Eastin, and Thomas “Sandy” Wilson, had settled on Rancho San Francisquito. A wealthy San Franciscan, George Gordon, bought out the squatters and Buelna heirs in 1863. George Gordon died in 1869, and his wife, Elizabeth, died in 1874, leaving the estate to her brother, John J. Clark. Clark died in 1876 and Leland Stanford bought 650 acres (2.6 km^{2}), known as the Mayfield Grange Farm, from Clark's widow, Margret T. Clark. The same year, Stanford bought 619 acres (2.5 km^{2}) from D. Hoag. By 1891 Stanford had expanded his holdings to 8,248 acres (33.4 km^{2}), including land from the adjacent Rancho Rincon de San Francisquito.

== Historic sites of the Rancho ==
- Antonio Buelna Adobe.

== See also ==
- Palo Alto Stock Farm Horse Barn
