= Pomponio =

Pomponio is a historic Italian first name which may refer to a number of Italian historical figures:

== Historic ==
- Julius Pomponius Laetus
- Pomponio Algerio
- Pomponio Amidano
- Pomponio Nenna
- Pomponio Amalteo

Additionally Pomponio is the common name of an early California rebel/bandit:

- José Pomponio Lupugeym

== Contemporary ==
- Dion Pomponio (musician)
