= Joseph Britton =

Joseph Britton may refer to:

- J. A. Britton (Joseph Albert Britton, 1839–1929), American bridge builder
- Joseph Britton (politician) (1911–1995), Australian politician
- Joseph Britton (lithographer) (1825–1901), co-founder of San Francisco Gold Rush era lithography studio and civic leader
