= Pomponio State Beach =

State park in California, United States

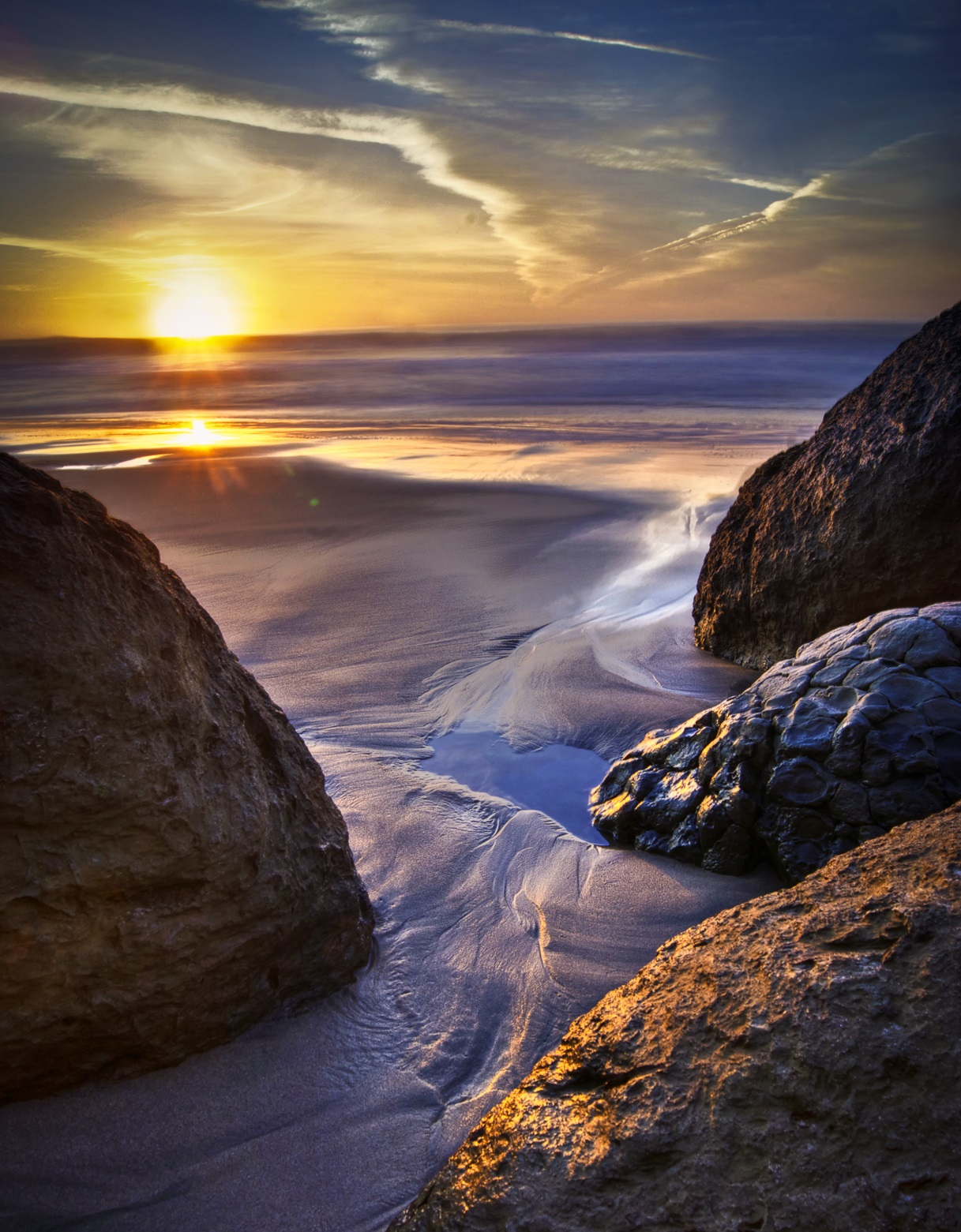

- Location within San Francisco Bay Area Location within California
- Location: San Mateo County, California
- Nearest city: San Gregorio
- Coordinates: 37°17′30″N 122°24′27″W
- Governing body: California Department of Parks and Recreation

Pomponio State Beach is a state beach of California in the United States. It is located 12 miles (19 km) south of Half Moon Bay off California State Route 1.

This coastal strip lies between Pescadero and San Gregorio State Beaches. It is made up of several miles of sloping, sandy beaches and a small lagoon below high sandstone bluffs.

A parking lot and a picnic area are available for public use during the day. There are hiking trails and beach access. No camping is available. Dogs and campfires are not permitted on the beach.

The beach was named after José Pomponio Lupugeym, a Bolinas Native American and outlaw. He was a captain of a group that called itself Los Insurgentes, and was captured and executed in 1824.

== See also ==
- List of beaches in California
- List of California state parks
