= Ponponio Lupugeyun =

- Born: circa 1799; Northern California
- Died: 6 February 1824; Presidio of Monterey
- Occupations: (tentative) Alcade, Mission San Rafael Arcángel
- Parent(s): Francisco (Tabal[j]eiu) and Antonina (Juniela)

Ponponio Lupegeyun (also spelt Pomponio; c. 1799 – 1824) was a Miwok insurgent, who served as the leader of a band of Indigenous Californians who called themselves Los Insurgentes and rebelled against Spanish and then Mexican rule in Alta California. Under his leadership, they raided settlements and ranchos between the areas of Sonoma and Soledad in the early 19th century.

Pomponio State Beach, Pomponio Creek, south of San Gregorio, and the Pomponio Trail in Pescadero Creek Park, San Mateo County, were named for him.

== Early years ==
Ponponio was a Coast Miwok from the Guaulen local tribe area of present-day Bolinas according to sources that reference the early Franciscan mission records. He was born to Francisco (Tabal[j]eiu) and Antonia (Juniela) about 1799 with the native name Lupegeyun (or [S]upugeyun). He was baptized at the Mission Dolores in San Francisco in 1803, and given the Spanish name "Ponponio". The mission recorder noted he was about four years old ("como 4"), when he was baptized. The mission records spell his name Ponponio. Later historians such as Hurt spell it Pomponio.

By legend Ponponio was also rumored to be "the bravest and most fearsome of the Cainameros tribe" which was a reference to the Southern Pomo of present-day Sonoma County, California.

Another non-mission source identifies him as an Ohlone from south of the Golden Gate, although this seems a legend without supporting documentation.

He may have at some time served the Mission San Rafael Arcángel as an alcade.

== Rebel years ==
Ponponio fled the mission and began raids against scattered ranches and missions about 1818. In the summer of 1823, his main camp was somewhere in the area of present-day Upper Alpine Road, San Mateo County. A cave "once called Ponponio's Cave" at the headwaters of Pomponio Creek, near Devils Canyon Falls, was said to have been his headquarters.

Originally, much of Ponponio's legend was assembled from unreliable, anecdotal sources. One romantic, fictionalized account of his life has Ponponio cutting off his own heels to escape from captivity. The origin of this story may be that a lieutenant of Ponponio's band, one Gonzalo from Carmel, was captured and put in irons, and was reported to have cut off both heels to escape. The historical account continues saying that after a career as a robber, Gonzalo asked Ponponio to bring a priest to make his dying confession. Rather than have a priest hear anything not to his (Ponponio's) benefit, Ponponio ran him through with a lance. Ponponio gave similar treatment to another of his lieutenants named Baltasar.

Ponponio raided far from his home vicinity of the Pescadero and San Gregorio Creeks.

He was captured by a party of four soldiers near San Rafael and tried by court martial in Monterey, and shot on February 6, 1824. The mission records also note this "Alcabuc[e]aron...por sentencia de un consejo de Guerra formado en el mismo Presidio." [They shot him by sentence of a war council formed in the same Presidio.]
