= Woodruff Creek =

River in California, United States

Coordinates: 37.337441°N 122.269690°W

Woodruff Creek is a small river in San Mateo County, California and is a tributary to La Honda Creek, which in turn is a tributary to San Gregorio Creek.

== See also ==
- List of watercourses in the San Francisco Bay Area
