= Rodgers Gulch =

Valley in California, United States

Coordinates: 37°17′50″N 122°14′58″W

Rodgers Gulch is a valley in San Mateo County, California, United States. It contains a small stream which is a tributary of San Gregorio Creek. The stream flows about 1.5 miles (2 km) from its source on Mindego Hill to its confluence with Alpine Creek, just east (upstream) of the boundary of the Heritage Grove Redwood Preserve.
