= San Gregorio Creek =

San Gregorio Creek Arroyo de San Gregorio, Arroyo Rodrigues
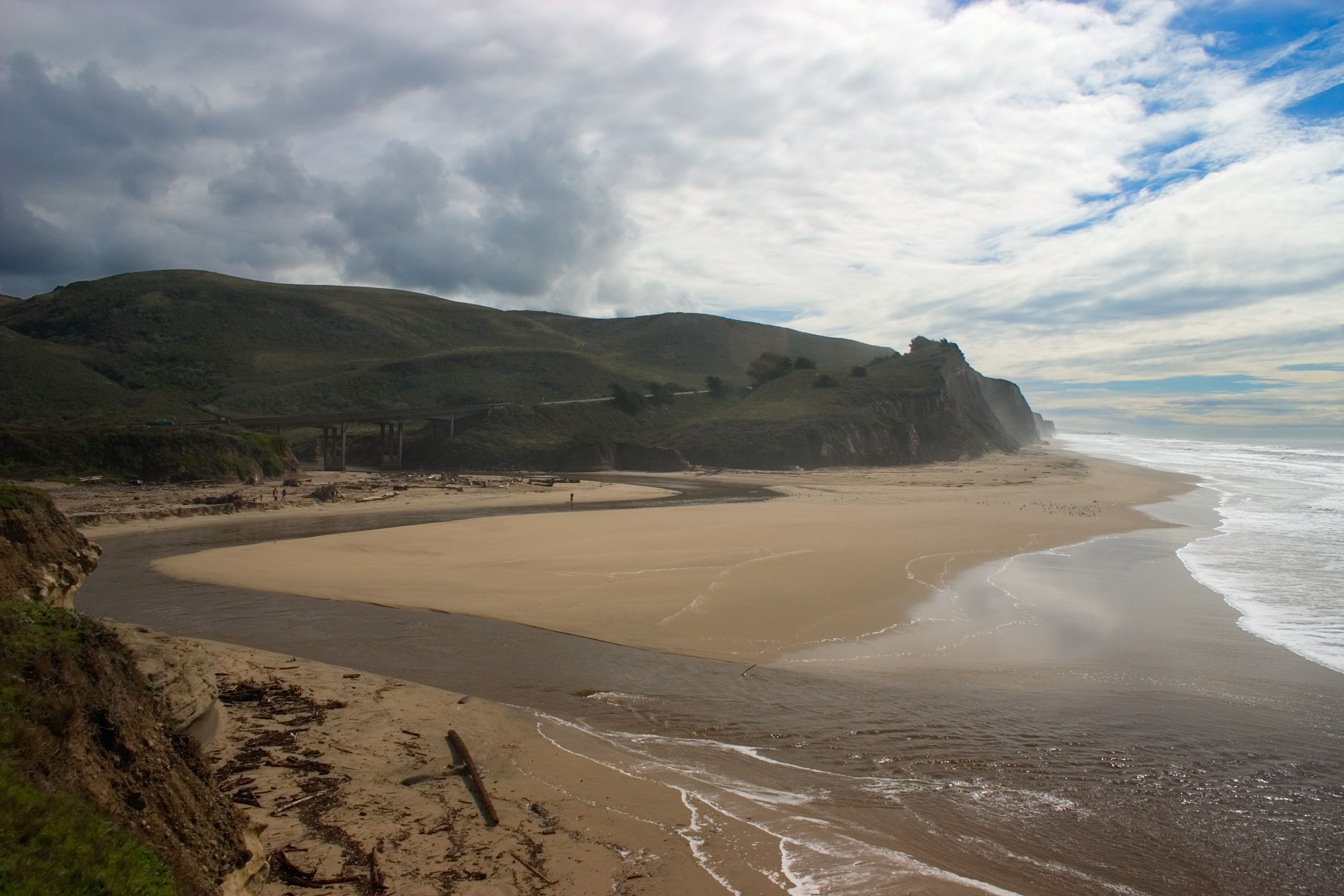
- San Gregorio State Beach

- Location of the mouth of San Gregorio Creek at the Pacific Ocean

Location
- Country: United States
- State: California
- Region: San Mateo County

Physical characteristics
- Source: Confluence of La Honda Creek and Alpine Creek in the Santa Cruz Mountains
- Source confluence
  - location: La Honda, California, San Mateo County, United States of America
  - coordinates: 37°19′45″N 122°16′58″W
  - elevation: 320 ft (98 m)
- Mouth: Pacific Ocean
  - location: San Gregorio, California
  - coordinates: 37°18′36″N 122°16′37″W
  - elevation: 0 ft (0 m)

Basin features
- Tributaries
  - left: Alpine Creek
  - right: La Honda Creek, Harrington Creek, Bogess Creek, El Corte de Madera Creek, Clear Creek, Coyote Creek

San Gregorio Creek (Spanish for: Saint Gregory) is a river in San Mateo County, California. Its tributaries originate on the western ridges of the Santa Cruz Mountains whence it courses southwest through steep forested canyons. The San Gregorio Creek mainstem begins at the confluence of Alpine and La Honda Creeks, whence it flows 12 miles (19 km) through rolling grasslands and pasturelands until it meets the Pacific Ocean at San Gregorio State Beach. It traverses the small unincorporated communities of La Honda, San Gregorio, Redwood Terrace and Sky Londa.

== History ==
San Gregorio Creek is historically significant as the campsite for Spanish explorer Gaspar de Portolà's expedition from October 24–27, 1769, when he overshot his goal (Monterey Bay) and went on to Pacifica where he ascended Sweeney Ridge and discovered San Francisco Bay. The site is registered as California Historical Landmark 26. The creek was called Arroyo de San Gregorio in Spanish times and later, Arroyo Rodrigues in the 1850s.

== Watershed ==
The San Gregorio watershed is located approximately 11 miles (18 km) south of Half Moon Bay and covers approximately 61 square miles (160 km^{2}). It is the second largest drainage in coastal San Mateo County, with approximately 45 miles (72 km) of "blue line" (perennial) streams. The mainstem of San Gregorio Creek begins at the confluence of Alpine Creek and La Honda Creek in La Honda, and flows 11.8 miles (19.0 km) to its mouth at San Gregorio State Beach in San Gregorio.

The creek ends in a lagoon primarily in the incised channel upstream from the Highway 1 Bridge. The lagoon at its seasonal largest, is about 5 acres (2.0 ha) and 6 feet (1.8 m) deep, and serves as habitat for tidewater goby (Eucyclogobius newberryi)) and rearing steelhead. Coho salmon do not rear in the lagoon but outgoing smolts use it to physiologically prepare for migration to saltwater.

This river occasionally experiences flooding on its path which parallels CA Route 84 down towards the Pacific Ocean. The most notable floods occurred in January 1982, January 1995, and January 1997. The January 1982 flood was particularly severe featuring a record peak stage height of 21.28 feet and a peak flow rate of 7,910 ft3/s on January 4.

== Ecology ==
The mainstem of San Gregorio Creek, in combination with its tributaries of La Honda, Alpine, Harrington, El Corte de Madera and Bogess Creeks, contains approximately 33 miles (53 km) of historical coho salmon (Oncorhynchus kisutch) rearing habitat. In the 1800s the creek had large enough salmon runs to support commercial harvest (Skinner, 1962). As part of the southern range of the Central California Coast Coho Evolutionarily Significant Unit (ESU), the creek is considered an attractive site for re-stocking. In fact, in 1998 the Draft Strategic Plan for Restoration of Endangered Coho Salmon South of San Francisco Bay identified San Gregorio Creek and its tributaries as one of nine creeks in which recovery of coho salmon (Oncorhynchus kisutch) is a priority. South of San Francisco to Monterey Bay the coho salmon was listed by the State of California as endangered in 1995. The San Gregorio watershed has seen recently increasing residential development but remains primarily pastoral with cattle and sheep grazing, timber harvesting, and recreational trails being the main commercial uses. Because of the large private ownership and development potential, water diversions and low base flows are an important issue in this watershed. In 1993, water rights in the San Gregorio watershed were adjudicated and a minimum stream bypass flow was established. However, the prescribed bypass flows are too low to assure viable coho salmon populations.

San Gregorio Creek is also part of the Central California Coast steelhead (Oncorhynchus mykiss irideus) ESU and historically supported a run of 1,000 fish as recently as 1971.

In 2007, the San Gregorio Creek watershed was targeted by the California Department of Fish and Game for salmon recovery.

In a 2008 survey, both coho salmon and steelhead were noted in the creek but threatened by Highway 84 related barriers to fish passage, as well as pressure from sedimentation from residential development, grazing and logging. The primary threat to salmonids in this report were bridge culverts at three sites which impede fish passage during low creek flows, and one site where a culvert from a small tributary is completely impassable in any season.

Four special-status animal species - California red-legged frog (Rana draytonii), coho salmon, steelhead, and tidewater goby are the focus of a June 2010 Watershed Management Plan.

Western leatherwood (Dirca occidentalis), Santa Cruz manzanita (Arctostaphylos andersonii), and King's Mountain manzanita (Arctostaphylos regismontana), which are all included in the California Native Plant Society's Inventory of Rare and Endangered Plants of California, have been documented in the La Honda Creek Open Space Preserve.

== Tributaries ==
From mouth to head:

- Palmer Gulch
- Coyote Creek
- Clear Creek
- El Corte de Madera Creek
  - Pine Tree Gulch
- Bogess Creek
- Kingston Creek (left bank)
- Harrington Creek
- La Honda Creek
  - Woodhams Creek
  - Langley Creek
  - Woodruff Creek
  - Weeks Creek
    - Spanish Ranch Creek
- Alpine Creek
  - Mindego Creek
  - Rodgers Gulch

== See also ==
- San Gregorio State Beach
- List of watercourses in the San Francisco Bay Area
