= Spanish Ranch =

Spanish Ranch may refer to:

- Spanish Ranch, California
- Spanish Ranch Creek
