= Langley Creek =

River in California, United States

Coordinates: 37°19′48″N 122°16′11″W

Langley Creek is a small river in San Mateo County, California and a tributary to La Honda Creek, which in turn is a tributary to San Gregorio Creek. It flows about 2 miles (3 km) from its source on Langley Hill to its confluence with La Honda Creek, a short distance upstream from the town of La Honda.
