= La Honda Creek Open Space Preserve =

Open space preserve in California, United States

Coordinates: 37.34°N 122.291°W

Upper La Honda Creek Open Space Preserve

The La Honda Creek Open Space Preserve is a publicly accessible open space reserve in San Mateo County, California, part of the Midpeninsula Regional Open Space District.

== History ==
The Ohlone people were indigenous to this area. In the 1800s the land became part of Rancho San Gregorio, in what was then Mexico.

The preserve contains a number of historic structures and remains, including remains of some of the sawmills used for the logging of the area that began in 1865, a red barn from what was previously a ranch, and an historic log cabin from the 1920s that was removed in 2023.

The preserve was established in 1984, but was closed to the public for years before opening to the public in 2017.

== Activities ==
The preserve contains several trails open to cycling, horseback riding, and hiking.

== Geography and Nature ==
Much of Bogess Creek's and some of La Honda Creek's watershed is contained within the preserve, which ranges from redwood forest to grassland.

Some of the preserve is actively used for cattle grazing.
