= Pomponio Creek =

Pomponio Creek Cañada de la La Salud
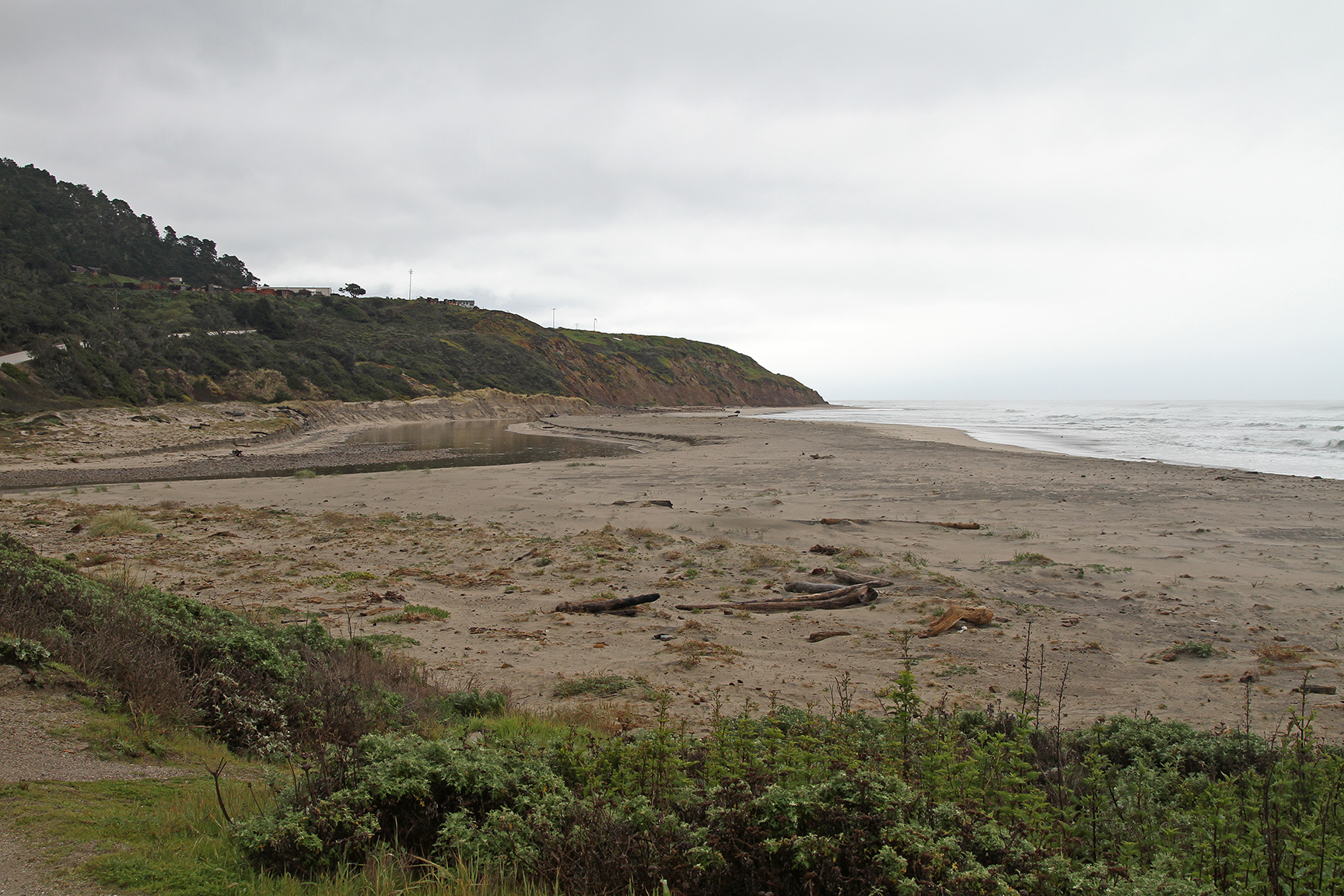
- The mouth of Waddell Creek at Waddell Beach, in the Rancho Del Oso section of the Big Basin Redwoods State Park

Location
- Country: United States
- State: California
- Region: Santa Clara County

Physical characteristics
- Source: Confluence of East and West Waddell Creeks in the
  - location: Big Basin Redwoods State Park
  - coordinates: 37°17′49″N 122°18′12″W
  - elevation: 962 ft (293 m)
- Mouth: Pacific Ocean
  - coordinates: 37°17′53″N 122°24′21″W
  - elevation: 0 ft (0 m)

Basin features
- Tributaries
  - left: East Waddell Creek
  - right: West Waddell Creek

Pomponio Creek is a 7.2 miles (11.6 km) westward flowing stream in San Mateo County, California that originates on the western slope of the Santa Cruz Mountains and flows into the Pacific Ocean at Pomponio State Beach.

== History ==
Pomponio Creek is named for Ponponio Lupugeyun (also known as José Pomponio Lupugeym), a resistance fighter against the California mission system who had a mountain hideout at the headwaters of Pomponio Creek.

== Watershed and Course ==
A dam forms Pomponio Reservoir is located at about 6.2 miles (10.0 km) upstream from the mouth.

== Ecology ==
A 15 foot high bedrock waterfall located about 2.3 miles (3.7 km) upstream from the creek mouth is an impassible barrier for immigrating steelhead trout (Oncorhynchus mykiss). In 2004, the private, nonprofit Peninsula Open Space Trust (POST) purchased conservation easements on the Arata Ranch along Pomponio Creek to protect the watershed.

== See also ==
- List of watercourses in the San Francisco Bay Area
