= Joseph Britton (lithographer) =

American lithographer

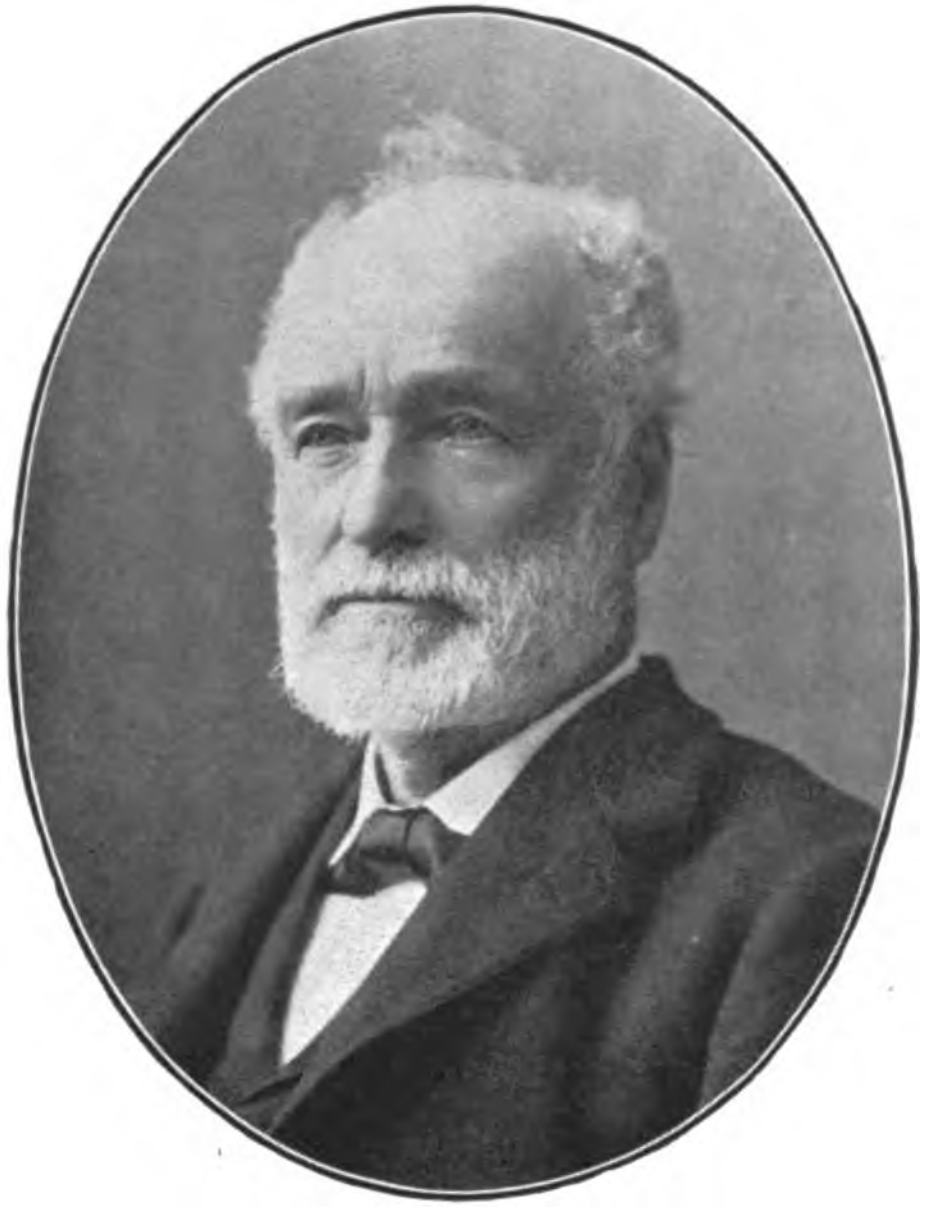
Joseph Britton

Joseph Britton (1825 – July 18, 1901) was a lithographer, the co-founder of prominent San Francisco lithography studio Britton and Rey, and a civic leader in San Francisco, serving as a member of the Board of Supervisors and helping to draft a new city charter.

== Biography ==
Britton was born in Yorkshire, England, and at age 10 immigrated to New York City, where he took up the trade of lithography. He came to California during the Gold Rush, travelling in 1849 with the George Gordon party via steamer from New York and overland travel through Nicaragua, an arduous journey that took eight months instead of the advertised two. After several unsuccessful years in various California mining camps, he settled in San Francisco in 1852.

In 1852 he became active in lithography and publishing, first under the name Pollard and Britton, and then Britton and Rey, a printing company founded with his friend and eventual brother-in-law Jacques Joseph Rey. Britton and Rey became known as the premier lithographic and engraving studio of the Gold Rush era, producing letter sheets, maps, and artistic prints. Common subjects in the studio's output included views of California cities and towns, depictions of mining life, and architecture. In 1857 the studio received a diploma for "The finest specimens presented" at a Mechanics' Institution exhibition, and Britton became a member of the institution and judge for the following year's exhibition.

Britton was active in San Francisco civic affairs for most of his life. He was reported to be a prominent participant in the Committee of Vigilance reform movement of the early 1850s and a member of the People's Party in the 1860s. He served on the Board of Supervisors in the 1860s and again in 1870, and with Henry L. Davis and James Moffitt, helped finance Andrew Smith Hallidie's Clay Street cable car line in 1872, the first of its kind in the world. In later years he pursued efforts to establish a local political party, the Taxpayers' party, which grew into a committee of freeholders, of which he was elected president in 1897, responsible for drafting a new San Francisco city charter. The charter was ratified by a public vote in 1898, approved by the state legislature in 1899, and took effect January 1, 1900.

Britton was a lifelong bachelor, and lived with his sister and Rey, who married in 1855.
