= Spanish Ranch Creek =

Small river in San Mateo County, California

Coordinates: 37°20′53″N 122°16′10″W

Spanish Ranch Creek is a small river in San Mateo County, California. It flows about 1 mile (2 km) west from its source to its confluence with Weeks Creek, which in turn joins La Honda Creek in the La Honda Creek Regional Open Space, about 2 miles north of the town of La Honda.
