= Palmer Gulch =

Palmer Gulch is a creeklet in San Mateo County, California and is a tributary of San Gregorio Creek.
