= San Gregorio House =

- U.S. National Register of Historic Places
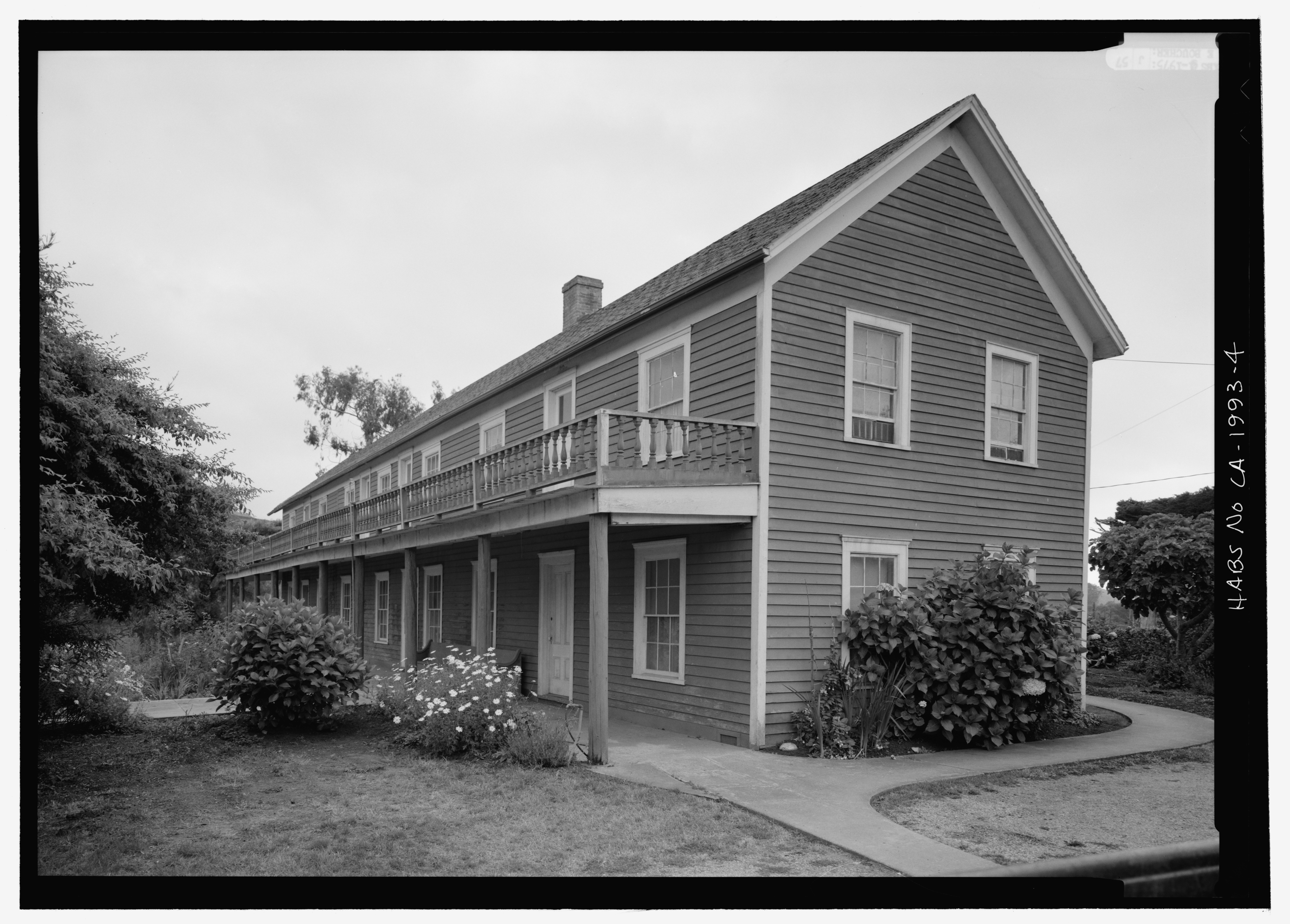
- San Gregorio House

- Location within San Francisco Bay Area Location within California Location within the United States
- Location: 7495-7587 Old Stage Road, San Gregorio, California
- Coordinates: 37°19′36.9″N 122°23′11.8″W
- Built: 1865; 161 years ago
- Architect: George Washington Tully Carter
- Architectural style: Greek Revival
- NRHP reference No.: 77000341
- Added to NRHP: May 6, 1977

San Gregorio House is a building that sits on 7495-7587 Old Stage Road near San Gregorio Road (CA 84) in San Gregorio, San Mateo County, California. The building is listed as a National Register of Historic Places in San Mateo County since 1977. The building still stands, but is no longer a functioning hotel.

== History ==
By the 1850s San Gregorio was a booming town, when wealthy San Franciscans would travel to the San Gregorio House by stagecoach to enjoy activities such as fishing, hunting, sea bathing, and boat races. The structure was expanded in the 1850s, to accommodate the crowds and included a saloon with a dance hall, liveryman's cottage, laundry, smoke house, granary, carriage sheds, power house, water tower, and numerous barns. All of the original structures still stand with the exception of the cookhouse and livery stable.

George Washington Tully Carter purchased an existing house in 1865 and added a second floor in order to open a hotel. In 1875, John Evans purchased the building and added seven bays to the three-bay house. From 1888 until the 1930s, Jesse Palmer and Frank Bell ran the hotel. It's previously known as the Palmer Hotel and the Bell Hotel.

== Gallery ==
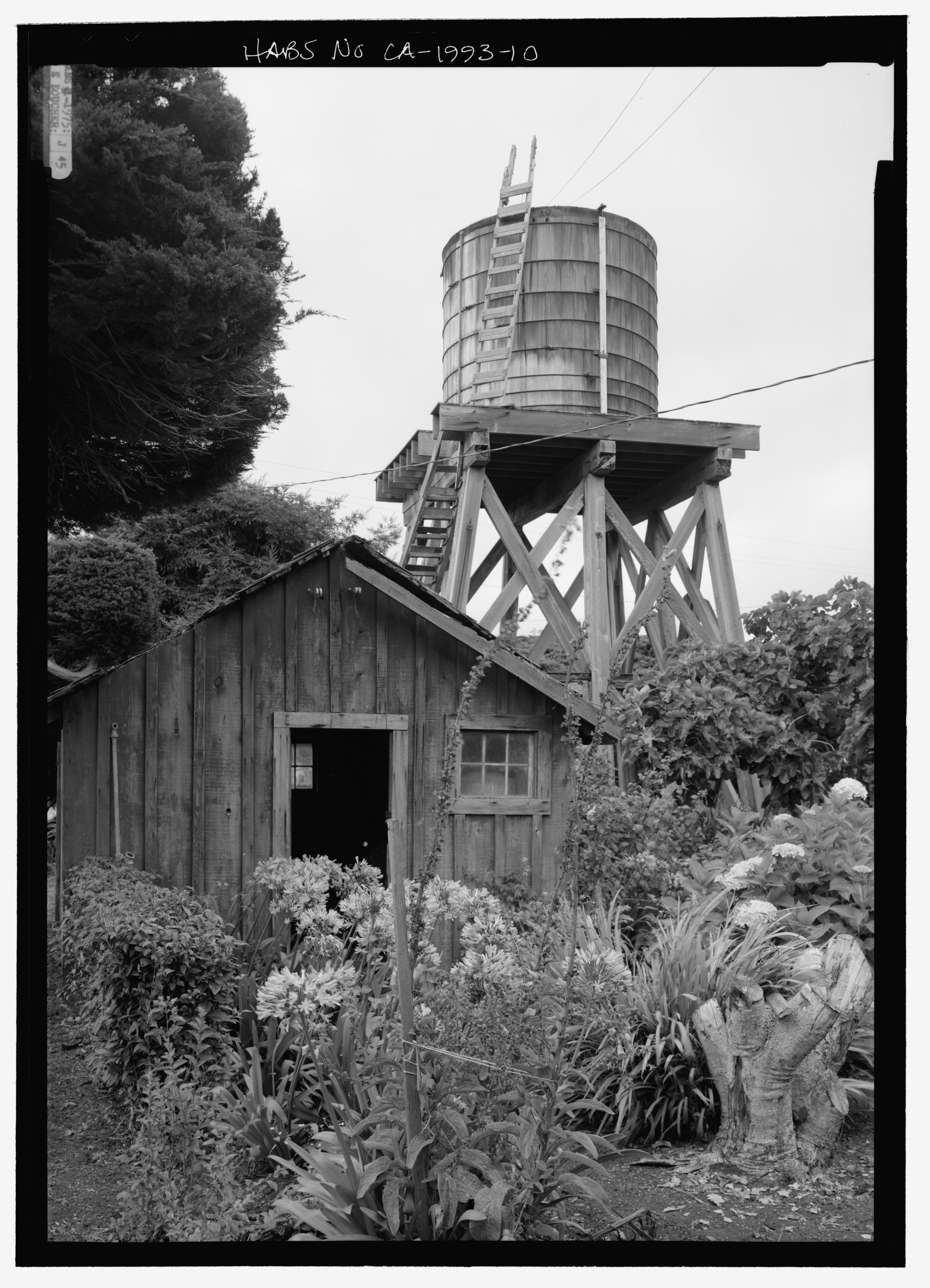
Shed and Water Tower

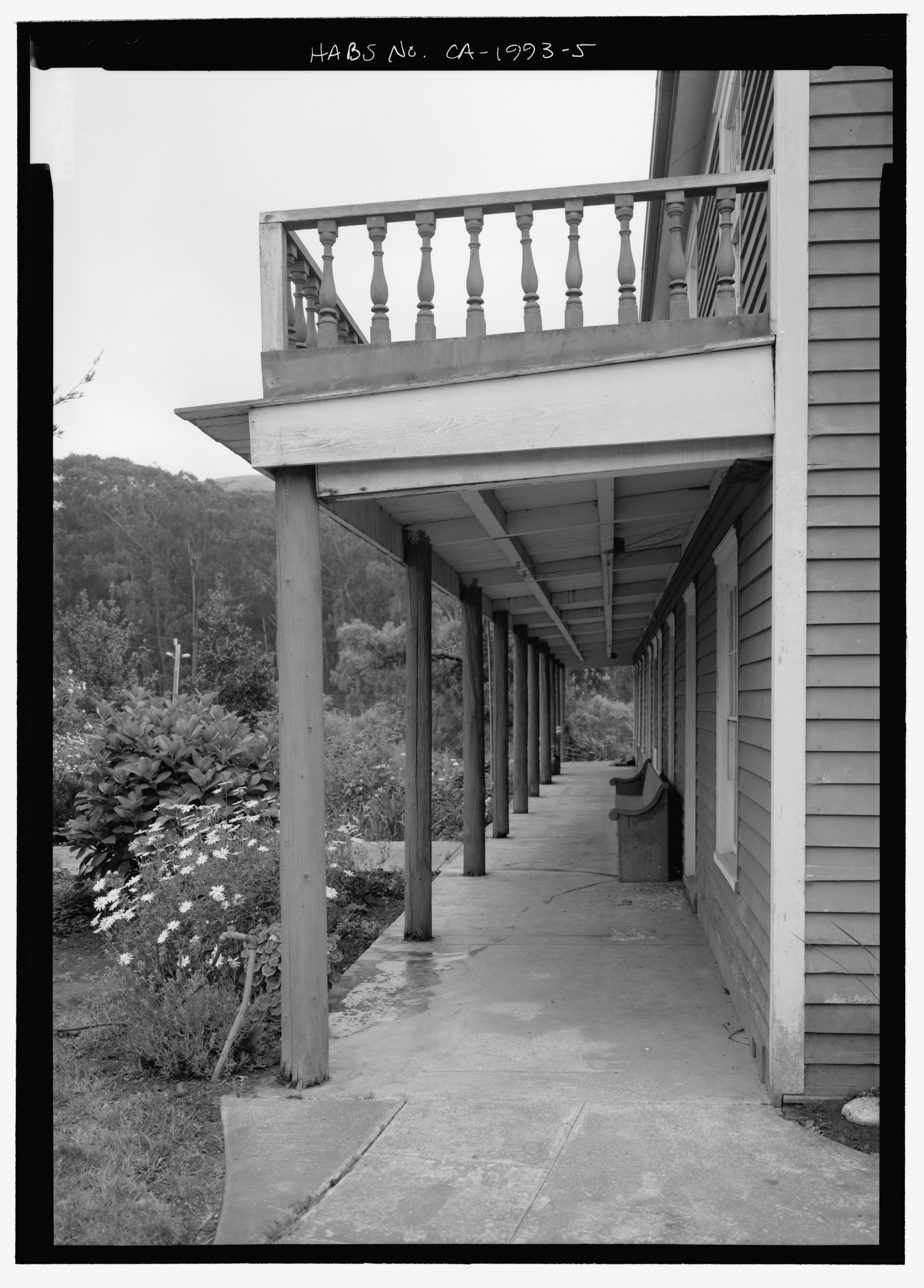
Side view

San Gregorio House architectural plans

Aerial view of San Gregorio House

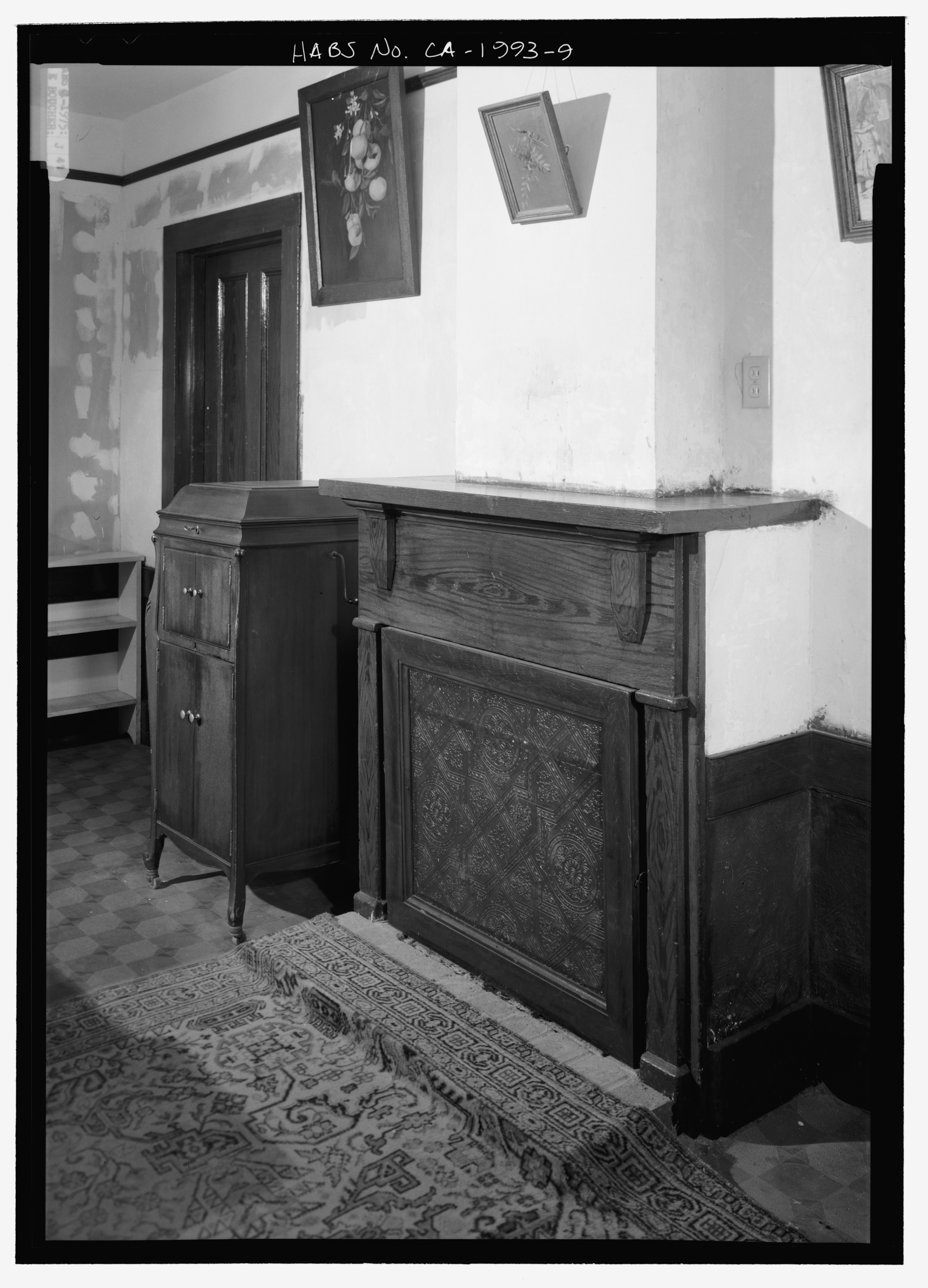
Interior picture

== See also ==
- National Register of Historic Places listings in San Mateo County, California
