= Rancho Arroyo del Rodeo =

Mexican land grant in California

Coordinates: 36.980°N 121.960°W

Rancho Arroyo del Rodeo was a 1,473-acre (5.96 km^{2}) Mexican land grant in present-day Santa Cruz County, California, USA, given in 1834 by Governor José Figueroa to Francisco Rodríguez. The grant extended from the Pacific Ocean between Rodeo Creek Gulch on the west and Soquel Creek on the east, encompassing portions of several present-day communities: eastern Live Oak, western Soquel and western Capitola.

== History ==
In 1834, Figueroa granted the one quarter square league (about 1,900 acres) Rancho Arroyo del Rodeo to Francisco Rodriguez. Rodriguez, a widower, married María Concepción Valencia, widow of Antonio Buelna, grantee of Rancho San Francisquito and Rancho San Gregorio. The Rodriguez casa was located on the west bank of Soquel Creek, near the center of today's community of Soquel.

John Daubenbis and John Hames arrived in California in 1843. Together, they built a gristmill and a sawmill on Soquel creek. In 1845, Daubenbiss and Hames bought Rancho Arroyo del Rodeo from Rodriguez. With the cession of California to the United States following the Mexican–American War, the 1848 Treaty of Guadalupe Hidalgo provided that the land grants would be honored. As required by the Land Act of 1851, a claim for Rancho Arroyo del Rodeo was filed with the Public Land Commission in 1853, and the grant was patented to John Daubenbiss and John Hames in 1882.

== Historic sites of the Rancho ==
- Daubenbiss House – the architect Thomas Beck designed an Italianate style home for the Daubenbiss family in 1867–68
