= Rancho Feliz =

Mexican land grant in California

Coordinates: 37.540°N 122.380°W

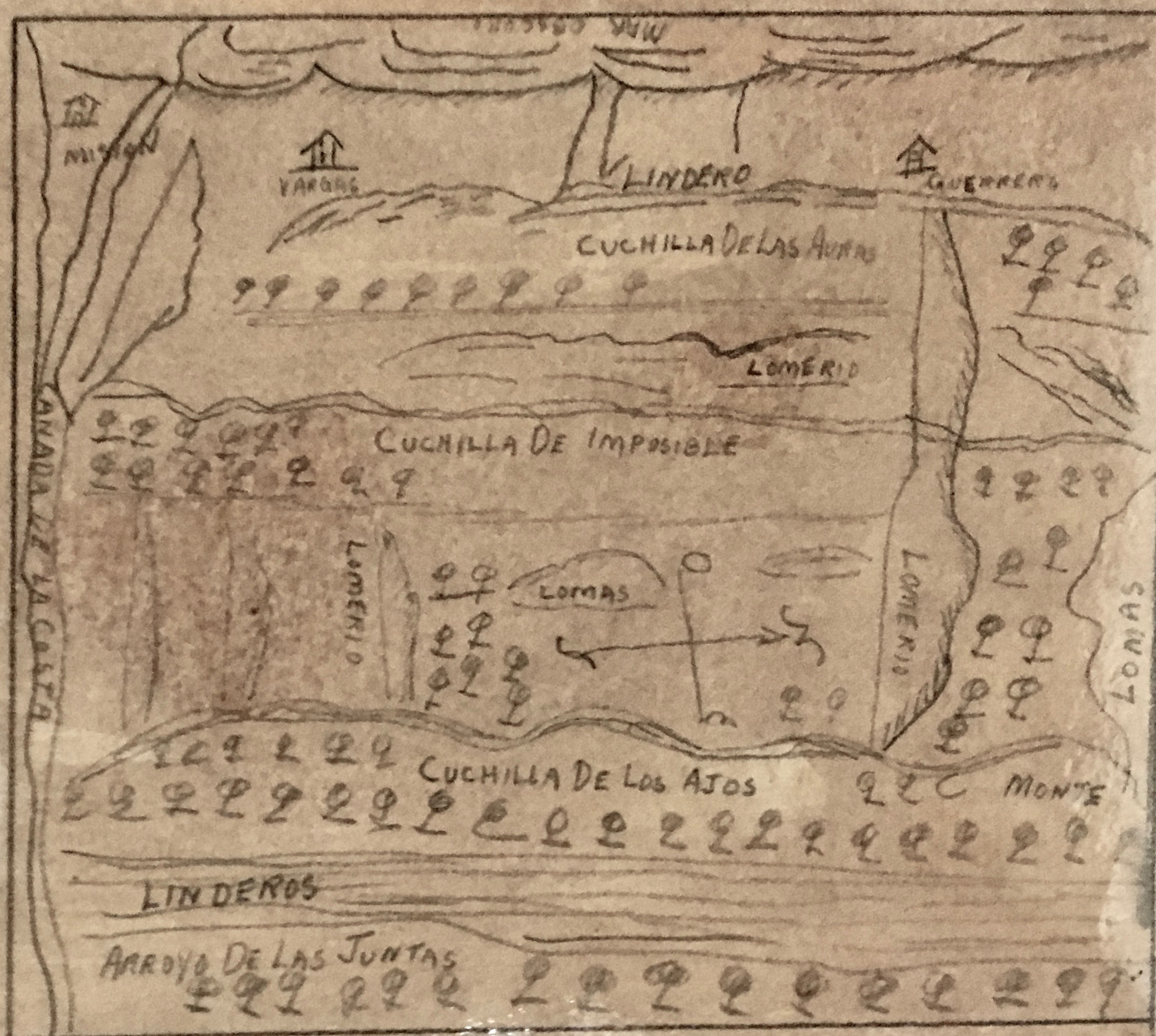
Diseño of land grant

Rancho Feliz was a 4,448-acre (18.00 km^{2}) Mexican land grant in present-day San Mateo County, California given on 30 April 1844 by Governor Manuel Micheltorena to Domingo Féliz. The grant extended north from Rancho Cañada de Raymundo along the San Andreas Valley, west of San Andreas Lake up to Sweeney Ridge.

== History ==
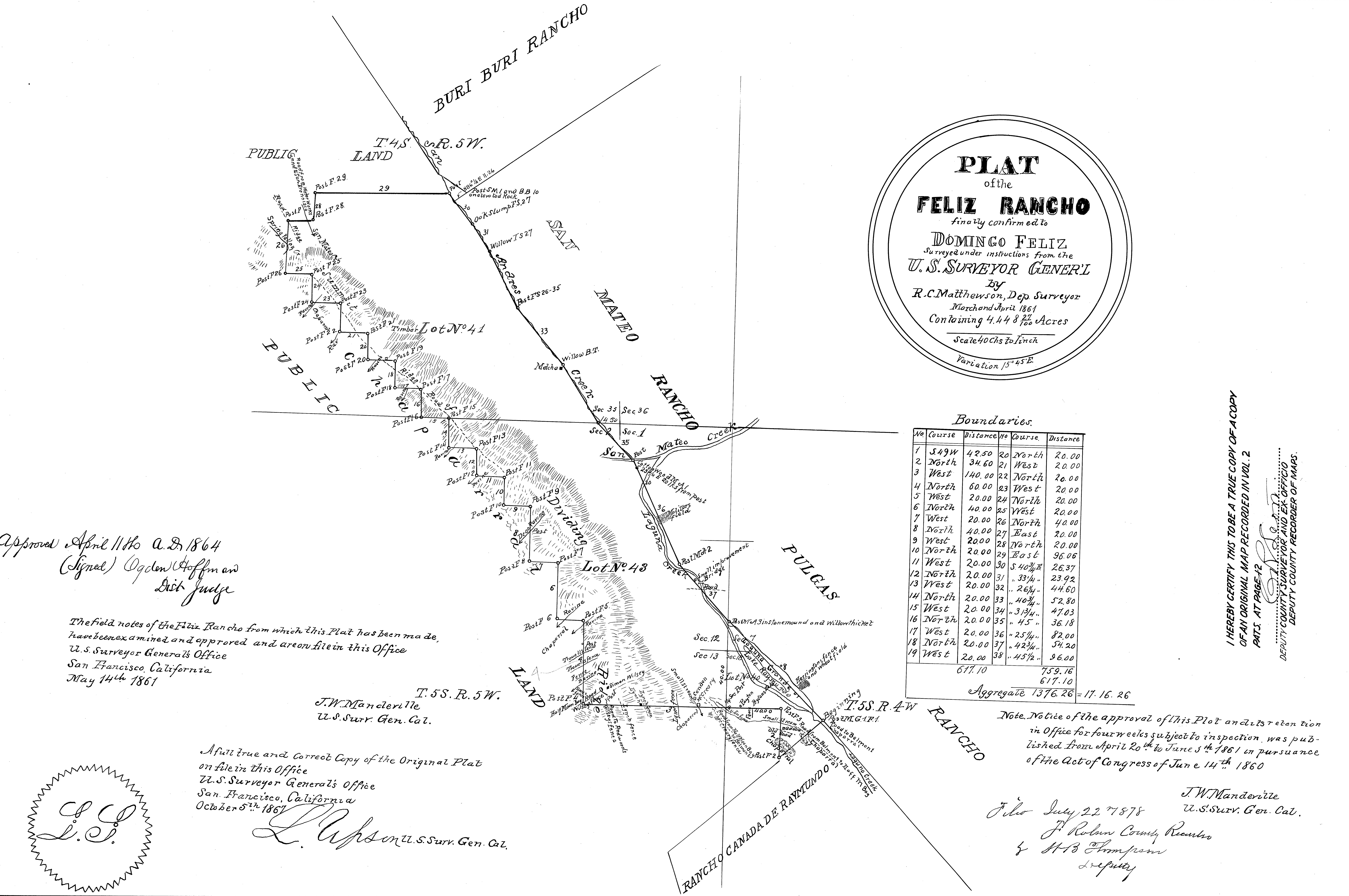
Plat of Feliz Rancho

Domingo Féliz (1820–??), born in San Francisco, received the one square league grant in 1844. This was also known as Cañada de las Auras.

With the cession of California to the United States following the Mexican–American War, the 1848 Treaty of Guadalupe Hidalgo provided that the land grants would be honored. As required by the Land Act of 1851, a claim for Rancho Feliz was filed with the Public Land Commission in 1852, and the grant was patented to Domingo Féliz in 1873.

In 1854 Agoston Haraszthy acquired 388-acre (1.57 km^{2}) of Rancho Feliz.
