= Mindego Creek =

River in the United States of America

Coordinates: 37.297442°N 122.254134°W

Mindego Creek is a small river in San Mateo County, California and is a tributary of San Gregorio Creek.

== See also ==
- List of watercourses in the San Francisco Bay Area
