= Kingston Creek =

River in California, United States

Coordinates: 37.310220°N 122.319693°W

Kingston Creek is a small river in San Mateo County, California and a tributary of San Gregorio Creek. The average flow rate is 60 US gallons per minute (0.0038 m^{3}/s), as measured midway through the path of the river. The river is pumped for irrigation. Some crayfish live in the river.

== See also ==
- List of watercourses in the San Francisco Bay Area
