= Clear Creek (San Mateo County) =

River in San Mateo County, California

Coordinates: 37.324665°N 122.355806°W

Clear Creek is a small river in San Mateo County, California and is a tributary of San Gregorio Creek.

== See also ==
- List of watercourses in the San Francisco Bay Area
