= Alpine Creek =

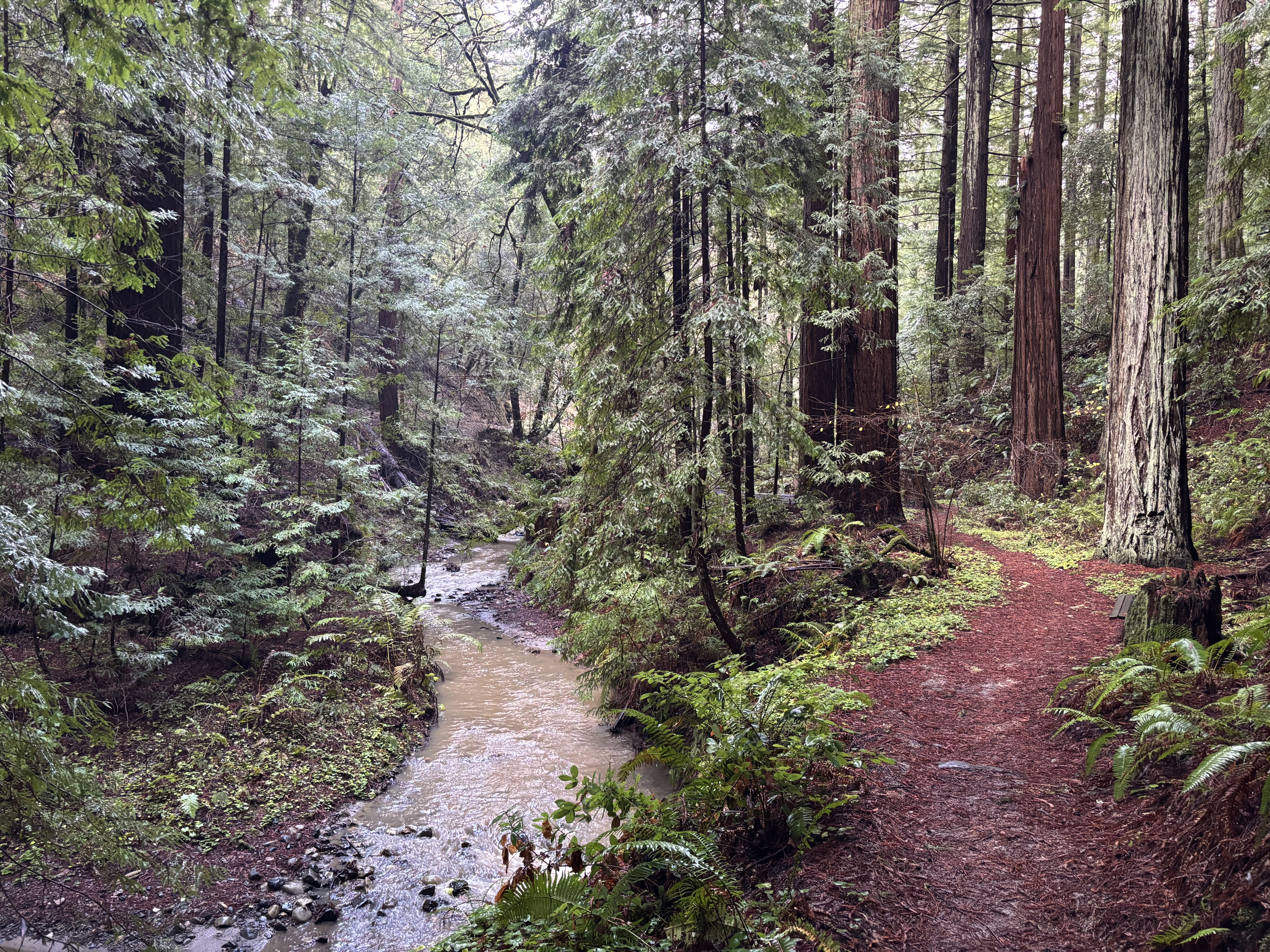
- Alpine Creek at Heritage Grove.

Location
- Country: United States

Physical characteristics
- Source
  - location: California
- Mouth
  - location: San Gregorio Creek
  - elevation: 320 feet (100 m)
- Length: about 5 miles (8 km)

Alpine Creek is a small river in San Mateo County, California. It flows about 5 miles (8 km), from its source (37°18′21″N 122°11′51″W) near West Alpine Road about a mile southwest of Skyline Boulevard (CA 35), to its confluence with La Honda Creek to form San Gregorio Creek in La Honda at California State Route 84.

Alpine Creek passes through Russian Ridge Open Space Preserve and Heritage Grove Redwood Preserve.

== See also ==
- List of watercourses in the San Francisco Bay Area
