= George Gordon (entrepreneur) =

British-born American entrepreneur

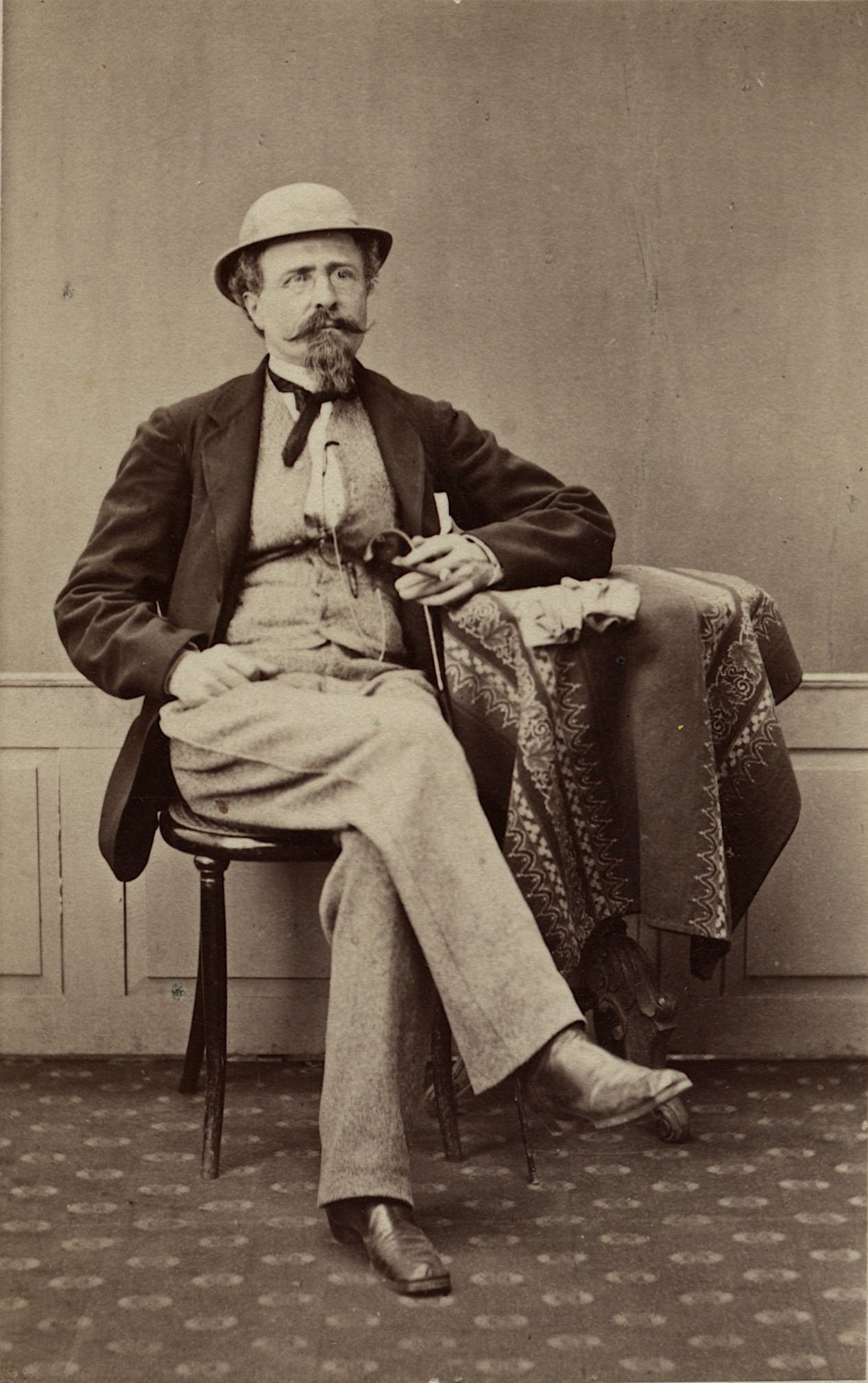
- Born: George Cummings; September 27, 1818; London, England, United Kingdom
- Died: May 22, 1869 (aged 50); San Francisco, California, United States
- Resting place: Cypress Lawn Memorial Park, Colma, California
- Occupation: Entrepreneur
- Known for: Development of early San Francisco and Palo Alto; founder of California's first sugar refinery
- Spouse: Elizabeth Anne Gordon (née Clark) (1825–1874)
- Children: Helen Mar "Nellie" Gordon (1844–1874)

George Gordon, born George Cummings, also known as George Gordon Cummings, (September 27, 1818, London, England – May 22, 1869, San Francisco, California). (Note: Various sources, including obituaries from the time of Gordon's death, give different birth years, most commonly circa 1819 or 1820, or different birth places, such as Scotland, and this is reflected in some later biographical materials. His biographer, Albert Shumate, was able to track down his baptismal record and other family records, clearly establishing a birth date, birth name, and approximate birth place. His baptismal record shows the birth name of "George Cummings" and no middle name, with "Gordon" adopted as a middle name and later a surname some years later. His place of baptism was the church of St George Botolph Lane in the City of London.) was a British-American developer and industrialist in mid-19th century San Francisco. Relatively little is known about his early life prior to migrating to the United States. He is thought to have been of Scottish descent. His occupation in England is listed as "colonial broker", specializing in the tea trade and, later, also guano. In 1847, he emigrated to New York City with his wife Elizabeth Anne and his young daughter, Nellie. It was around this time that he dropped the name "Cummings" and adopted his middle name, "Gordon", as his surname.

After hearing the news of the California Gold Rush in 1848, he formed Gordon's California Association, a company for transporting migrants, including himself, to California, mostly by sea, though using the Nicaraguan isthmus route to get from the Atlantic to the Pacific Ocean. His 1849 journey was poorly planned and provisioned, and ended up taking eight months rather than the planned two, nearly running out of food, and coming to near mutiny. While delayed in Nicaragua, he devised a plan to buy up as much lumber as he could purchase, anticipating a demand for building materials on arrival in San Francisco. This paid off in thousands of dollars in profits once he reached San Francisco.

In San Francisco, he started businesses in wharf construction and in the sale of prefabricated homes. Noting the vulnerability of the city to fire, he began to import prefabricated iron houses. In 1852, he started an ironworks, the Vulcan Iron Works, producing a range of iron goods for both households and industry.

From 1852 to 1854, he developed the San Francisco neighborhood South Park, with the aim of creating an exclusive residential community, patterned after the garden squares and circles of London and New York City. The development consisted of townhouses centered on a 550-foot oval-shaped grassy park. A Dutch-style windmill in the center of the park pumped water for the park and surrounding homes. By 1854, seventeen luxury homes surrounding the park were completed.

By the mid-1850s, Gordon had begun to lose interest in the development, realizing that it was not bringing him the income he had hoped for. In 1856, he moved on to a new venture, California's first sugar refinery, the San Francisco and Pacific Sugar Refinery. By the early 1860s, the refinery was one of San Francisco's most important businesses and made Gordon very wealthy.

The success of his sugar enterprise would draw competitors. Claus Spreckels, who ran a nearby brewery and saloon, one day overheard factory workers talking about wastefulness and inefficiency in the refining process, leading Spreckels to conclude that he could earn even greater wealth with an efficient refining process. In 1864, Spreckels opened the Bay Sugar Refining Company and started a price war against Gordon's company, which gradually began losing market share.

In 1863, Gordon purchased the former Rancho San Francisquito, near Mayfield (now Palo Alto) on the San Francisco Peninsula. He renamed it Mayfield Grange and relocated there permanently in 1864. His elaborate house parties were the talk of San Francisco society.

In addition to his entrepreneurial and social activities, Gordon was a prolific author of pamphlets and letters to the editor, weighing in on topics as varied as maritime safety, calls for peace in the leadup to the American Civil War, the value of immigration, the advantages of an overland mail route, and his outspoken opposition to the 1856 San Francisco Committee of Vigilance.

From 1865 to 1867, Gordon travelled to Europe, where he attempted, unsuccessfully, to obtain information on European sugar refining methods, which were often trade secrets. His health began to fail, and he returned home to recover. In early 1869, his daughter eloped with a man whom Gordon despised. His health took another turn for the worse, and he died several months later.

His Mayfield Grange estate was inherited by his wife, Elizabeth Anne Gordon. After both she and their daughter Nellie died in an 1874 typhoid epidemic, ownership of the estate quickly passed through a series of in-laws, and was finally sold to Leland Stanford in 1876, becoming the Palo Alto Stock Farm as well as Stanford's personal estate. In 1903, the property became part of the Stanford University campus.
