= Rancho Cañada de Raymundo =

Mexican land grant in California

Coordinates: 37.440°N 122.300°W

Rancho Cañada de Raymundo was a 12,545-acre (50.77 km^{2}) Mexican land grant in present-day San Mateo County, California given August 4, 1840 to Raimundo (also known as Raymundo), a native of Baja California, who was sent out by the padres of Mission Santa Clara to capture runaway Mission Indians in 1797. On the 1856 Rancho de las Pulgas and 1868 Easton maps, the valley of Laguna Creek was referred to as the Cañada de Raymundo. Laguna Creek was also alternatively known as Cañada Raimundo Creek. In 1841 Rancho Cañada de Raymundo was granted to John Coppinger by Governor Juan Alvarado for helping in the revolt led by Alvarado against the Mexican authorities in Monterey. The two and one half league long by three-quarter league wide grant consisted the eastern slopes and valleys in the present-day Woodside area. The grant began at Alambique Creek, the north border of Rancho Corte de Madera, and extended north to Rancho Feliz. Rancho Cañada de Raymundo was bounded on the east by Rancho de las Pulgas. The rancho contained Laguna Grande (absorbed by Upper Crystal Springs Reservoir), then a natural lake that was the campsite of the Portolà expedition on November 5, 1769, and was bisected by Laguna Creek, which flowed from southeast to northwest through the lake on its way to San Mateo Creek.

== History ==
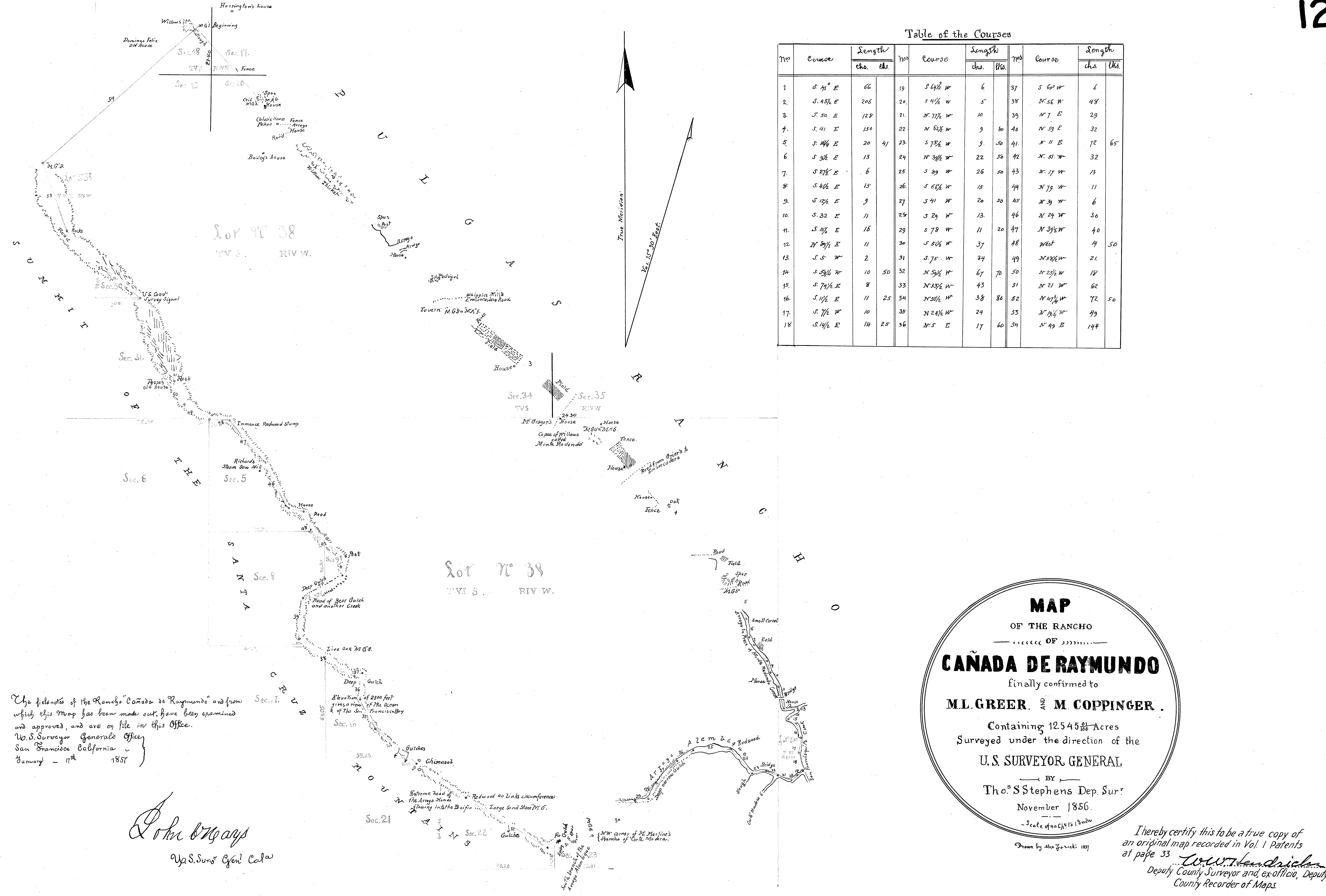
Cañada de Raymundo map of 1856

John Coppinger (1810–1847), a lieutenant in the British Navy, deserted his ship in San Francisco in 1835. He worked for María Antonia Mesa the widow of Rafael Soto on Rancho Rinconada del Arroyo de San Francisquito. Coppinger married Soto's daughter, María Luisa Soto (1817–1883), in 1839. In 1841 he was granted Rancho Cañada de Raymundo by Alvarado for Coppinger's help in the revolt led by Alvarado against the Mexican authorities in Monterey. During the Mexican-American War the authorities became suspicious of Coppinger's loyalty and took him as a prisoner to Mexico, but he was soon released and returned to California, remaining at his ranch until his death in 1847. His daughter, Manuela Coppinger (b. 1847), married Antonio Miramontes.

After Coppinger's death, his widow, Maria Luisa Soto moved back to Rancho Rinconada del Arroyo de San Francisquito. John Lucas Greer (1808–1885), an Irish sea captain, came to San Francisco from South America in 1849. While on a prospecting trip in a small skiff around San Francisco Bay, he sailed up San Francisquito Creek. In 1850, Greer and María Luisa Soto were married. Greer and Soto moved to an adobe on Rancho Cañada de Raymundo, which they called Greersburg, and made a business from lumber and tallow. Greer and Soto had three sons and two daughters.

With the cession of California to the United States following the Mexican-American War, the 1848 Treaty of Guadalupe Hidalgo provided that the land grants would be honored. As required by the Land Act of 1851, a claim for Rancho Cañada de Raymundo was filed with the Public Land Commission in 1852, and the grant was patented in 1859 to María Luisa Soto Coppinger Greer and Manuela Coppinger.

In 1846, Charles Brown bought 2,880 acres (11.7 km^{2}) from Coppinger, and Dennis Martin (d. 1890) bought 1,400-acre (5.7 km^{2}) from Coppinger.

Simon Monserrat Mezes (d. 1884), a lawyer who owned a share of the adjacent Rancho de las Pulgas, disputed the location of the boundary between the Rancho de las Pulgas and Rancho Cañada de Raymundo. Although both Rancho de las Pulgas and Rancho Cañada de Raymundo had been patented by the US Government, the 1856 official survey of Rancho de las Pulgas, meant that boundaries of the two grants overlapped. This situation required an Act of Congress in 1878 to resolve.

From 1852 onward, the Spring Valley Water Company, the supplier of water to San Francisco, began purchasing parcels of the Rancho Cañada de Raymundo and imposing watershed restrictions on these properties. In 1861, Greer and María Luisa Soto were unable to pay the taxes on their land, so in 1869, they moved to back to Rancho Rinconada del Arroyode San Francisquito.
