= Bellvale, California =

Unincorporated community in California, United States

Bellvale is a populated place in San Mateo County, California, United States, located at 37°18′43″N 122°19′12″W. The small community is on Highway 84 (La Honda Road) between San Gregorio and La Honda, at 240 feet above sea level.

Bellvale was named for the Bell family, who settled in the area during the mid-nineteenth century. James Bell paid for construction of a schoolhouse in 1869, which served children from nearby La Honda. Although Bellvale once had a post office, the community is now only sparsely settled with homes and farms. The Bellvale post office, located 2.25 miles west of La Honda, opened in 1897 and was discontinued in 1922. U.S. Geological Survey maps show oil wells in the area, tapping a relatively small pool of petroleum that was first identified in the nineteenth century.
