= Coyote Creek (San Mateo County) =

Stream in San Mateo County, California, US

Coyote Creek is a stream in San Mateo County, California, and is a tributary of San Gregorio Creek.

37.327998°N 122.36914°W

== See also ==
- List of watercourses in the San Francisco Bay Area
