= Rancho Rinconada del Arroyo de San Francisquito =

Mexican land grant in California

Coordinates: 37.450°N 122.140°W

Rancho Rinconada del Arroyo de San Francisquito was a 2,230-acre (9.0 km^{2}) Mexican land grant in present-day Santa Clara County, California given in 1841 by Governor Juan Alvarado to María Antonia Mesa. The name means "ranch at the bend in San Francisquito Creek".

The grant was located south of San Francisquito Creek, and encompassed present day Menlo Park and downtown Palo Alto.

== History ==
Rafael Soto (1789–1839), the son of De Anza Expedition settlers Ygnacio Soto and María Bárbara Espinosa de Lugo, was born in the Pueblo of San José. Rafael Soto married María Antonia Mesa (b. 1802) in 1819. In 1827, Rafael Soto came to stay on Rancho Cañada del Corte de Madera of Máximo Martínez. In 1835, Rafael Soto and family settled near San Francisquito Creek, selling goods to travelers. Rafael Soto died in 1839. His widow, Antonia Mesa Soto, was granted a one half square league by Governor Juan Bautista Alavardo in 1841. Soto's daughter, María Luisa Soto (1817–1883) married John Coppinger, grantee of Rancho Cañada de Raymundo.

With the cession of California to the United States following the Mexican-American War, the 1848 Treaty of Guadalupe Hidalgo provided that the land grants would be honored. As required by the Land Act of 1851, a claim for Rancho Rinconada del Arroyo de San Francisquito was filed with the Public Land Commission in 1852. The claim was rejected by the Commission on the grounds that there was no description of the granted land either in the grant itself, or the map which accompanied it. On appeal, based on the testimony of Aaron Van Dorn, Deputy United States Surveyor, the District Court confirmed the grant in 1855, and the grant was patented to María Antonia Mesa in 1872.

When Land Commission rejected their claim, the Soto family agreed to give Thomas Seale half the land if he could secure the grant's confirmation. Thomas Seale (1826–1907), was born in Ireland, and came to San Francisco via New Orleans in 1850, where he and his brother, Henry W. Seale (d.1888), operated a contracting business. The brothers received about 1,400 acres (5.7 km^{2}) for their efforts. In 1858, Paul Shore was killed by Samuel J. Crosby on Henry W. Seale's property, and in 1859, Thomas Shore, the brother of Paul, shot and killed Crosby.

In 1887, Seale sold 697 acres (2.8 km^{2}) to Timothy Hopkins (1859–1936) who developed the town which would become Palo Alto. In 1864, Dr. William Newell bought 60 acres (0.2 km^{2}) from Henry W. Seale. The remainder of Seale's property was farmed until his death in 1888.

== See also ==
- Ranchos of Santa Clara County, California
