= El Corte de Madera Creek =

Creek in San Mateo County, California

Location
- Country: United States
- State: California

Physical characteristics
- Source
  - location: San Mateo County, California
  - coordinates: 37°19′2.31″N 122°20′23.44″W
- Mouth
  - location: San Gregorio Creek
  - coordinates: 37°24′26.24″N 122°18′51.29″W
  - elevation: 35 metres (115 ft)
- Length: about 7 miles (11 km)
- Basin size: Santa Cruz Mountains

El Corte de Madera Creek (Spanish for: The Cutting of Wood) is a small river in the Santa Cruz Mountains, San Mateo County, northern California. It is a tributary of San Gregorio Creek.

The creek flows about 7 miles (11 km), from its source in Kings Mountain (37°24′44″N 122°18′40″W) near Skeggs Point on Skyline Boulevard (CA 35), to its confluence with San Gregorio Creek about 2.7 miles east of San Gregorio.

The bulk of El Corte de Madera Creek's upper watershed is in El Corte de Madera Creek Open Space Preserve of the Midpeninsula Regional Open Space District, which features popular hiking and mountain biking trails.

== See also ==
- List of watercourses in the San Francisco Bay Area
