= Harrington Creek =

Californian river

Coordinates: 37.319387°N 122.301914°W

Harrington Creek is a small river in San Mateo County, California and is a tributary of San Gregorio Creek.

== See also ==
- List of watercourses in the San Francisco Bay Area
