= Bogess Creek =

River in California, United States

Coordinates: 37.3149425°N 122.3291378°W

Bogess Creek is a small river in San Mateo County, California and is a tributary of San Gregorio Creek.

== See also ==
- List of watercourses in the San Francisco Bay Area
