= San Gregorio State Beach =

State park in California, United States

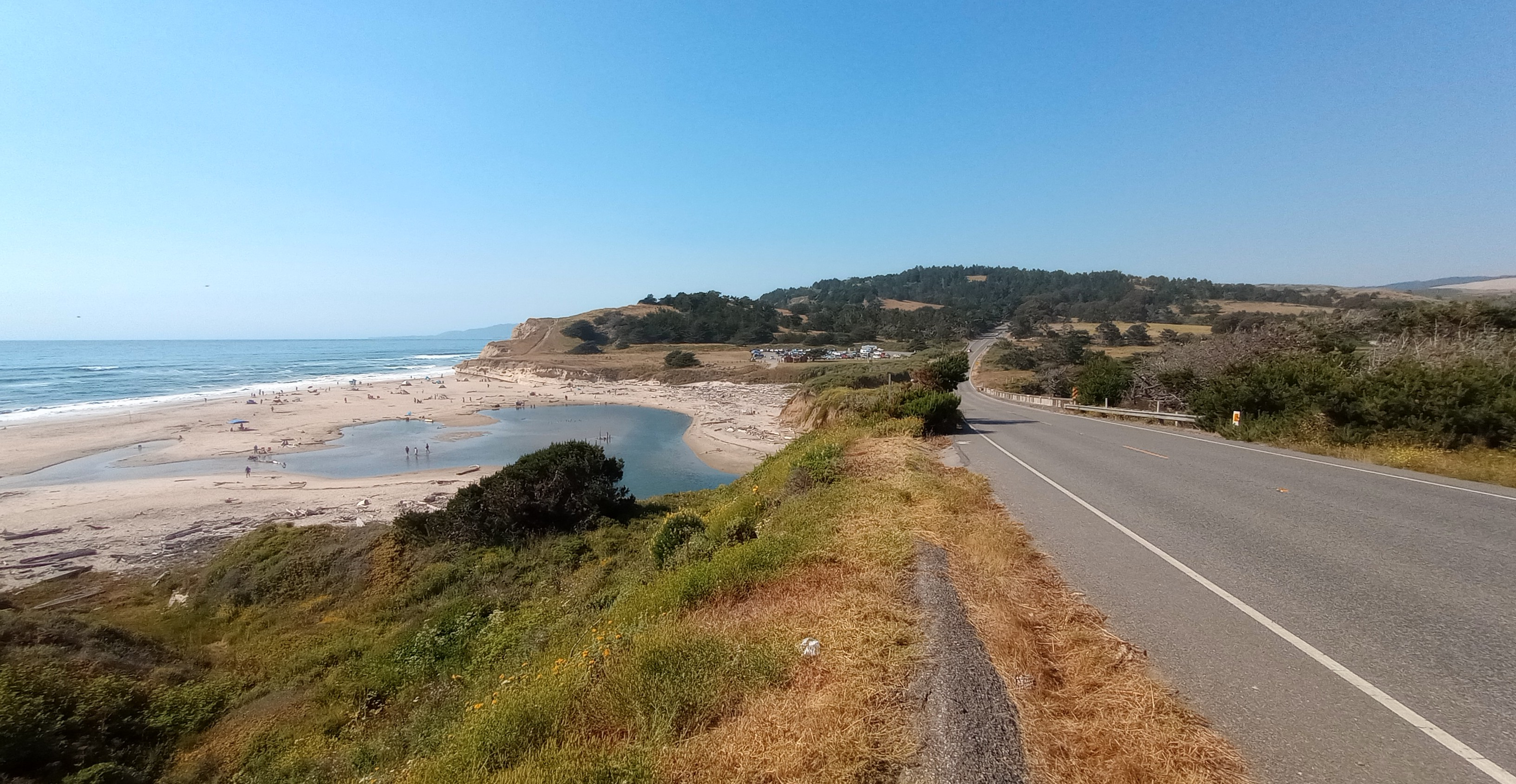

- Location within California Location within the United States
- Location: San Mateo County, California
- Nearest city: San Gregorio
- Coordinates: 37°19′23″N 122°24′7″W
- Governing body: California Department of Parks and Recreation

San Gregorio State Beach is a beach near San Gregorio, California, United States, south of Half Moon Bay. Part of the California State Park System, the beach lies just west of the intersection of California State Route 1 and State Route 84.

== Geography ==
San Gregorio Creek widens to form a small freshwater lagoon in the park behind a sand berm, or barrier beach, which typically blocks the mouth of the creek, forcing the creekwaters to flow underfoot as they seep into the Pacific Ocean. During the rainy season the creek often cuts through the sand berm and flows directly into the ocean. Historically the creek was a coho salmon spawning site, and the Department of Fish and Game is considering restocking it with coho to improve the salmon fisheries south of San Francisco.

It is one of the cleanest beaches in the state.

== Amenities ==
Park facilities include restrooms and picnic tables. Dogs are not permitted on the beach, as it has been identified as an itinerant nesting habitat for the locally underpopulated western snowy plover. It is considered a self-registered fee area, although there is a kiosk which is staffed during summer months. North of the main beach is a nude beach on private property.

== Historical significance ==
A stone marker with a plaque (now missing) commemorates the three days Spanish explorer Gaspar de Portolà's expedition camped at the beach to rest and treat their sick in 1769, during their (failed) attempt to locate Monterey Bay. They would go on to discover San Francisco Bay instead.

The site is registered as California Historical Landmark 26.

== Gallery ==
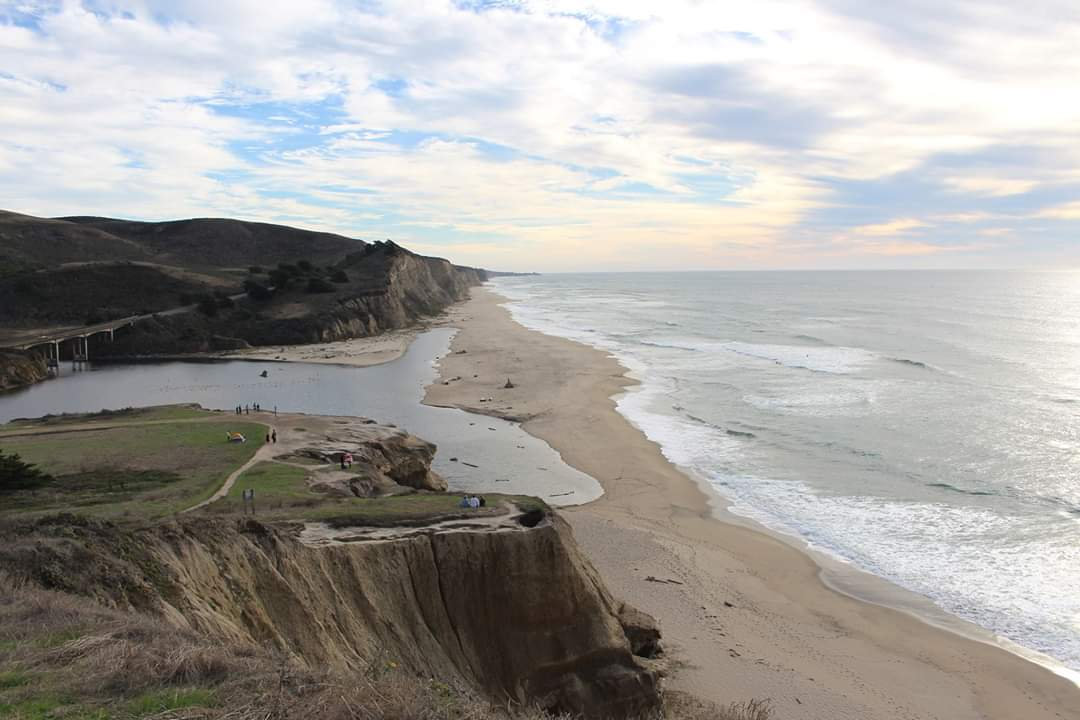
View of San Gregorio State Beach

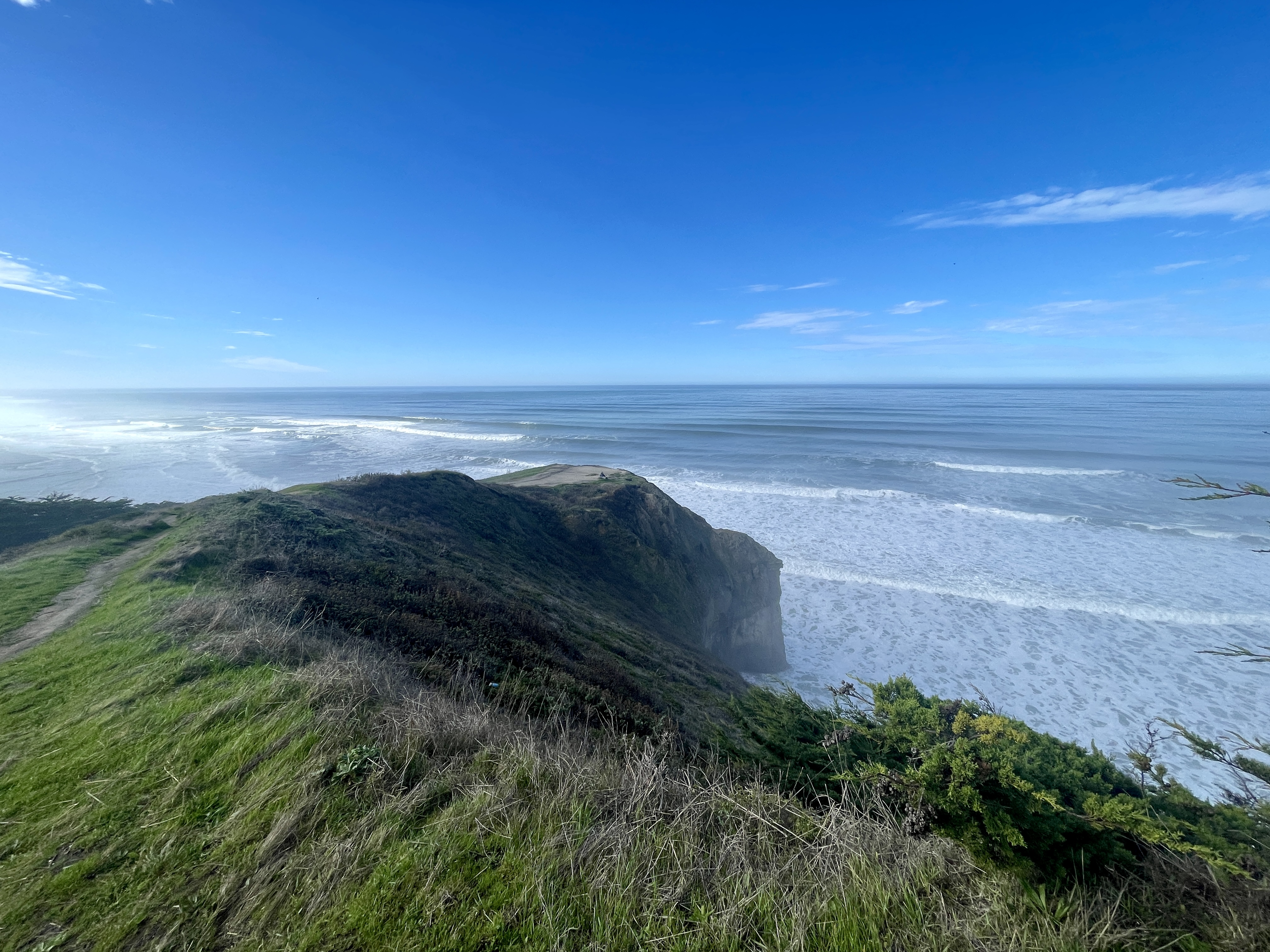
View of Pacific Ocean from San Gregorio State Beach

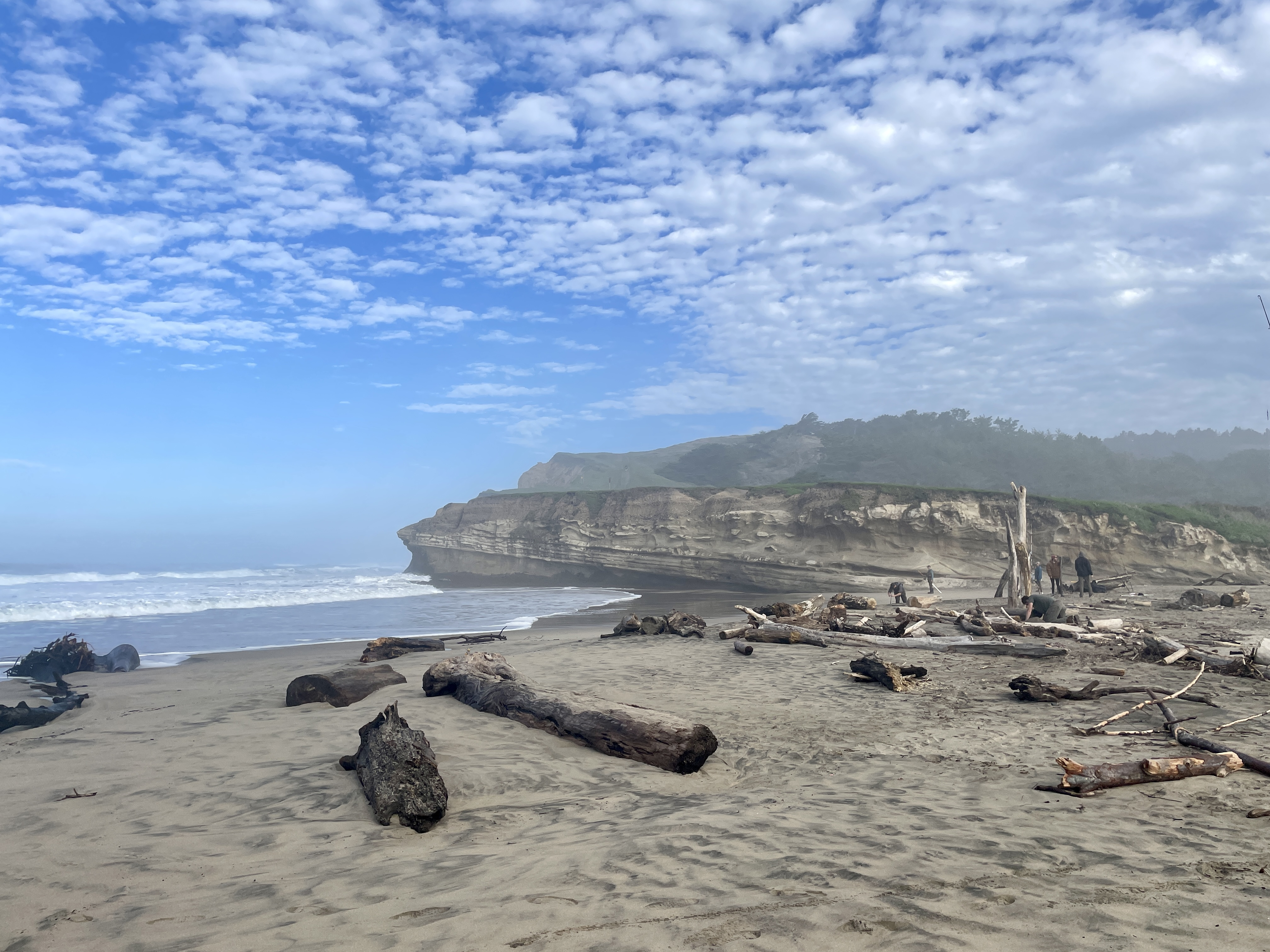
View looking north towards cliffs at San Gregorio State Beach

== See also ==
- Half Moon Bay State Beach, for further information on history and wildlife of the local area.
- List of beaches in California
- List of California state parks
