= San Gregorio, California =

Unincorporated community in California, United States

- Unincorporated community
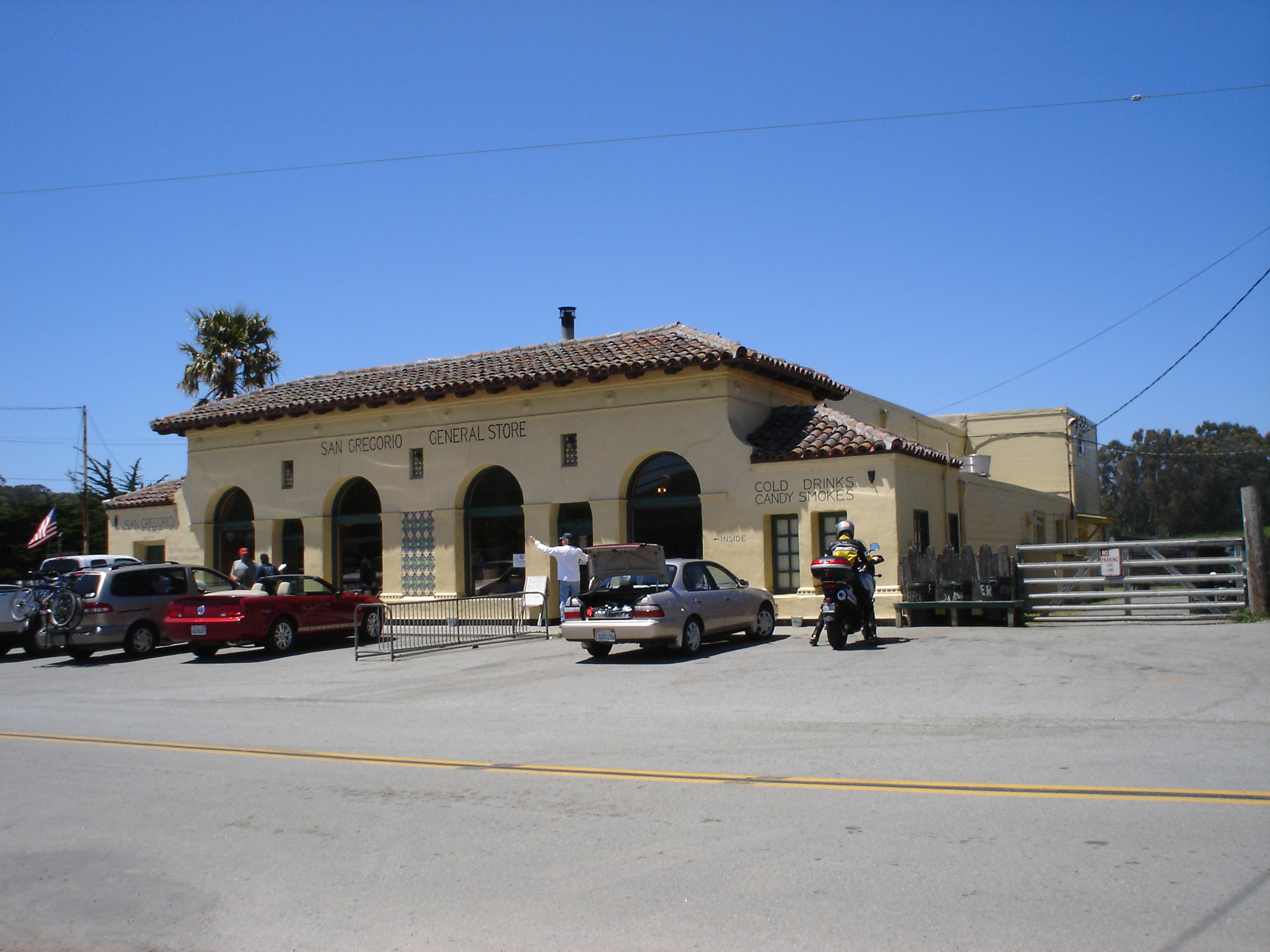
- Historic San Gregorio General Store, corner of California Highway 84 and Stage Road, May 2008.

- Location within California Location within the United States
- Coordinates: 37°19′38″N 122°23′12″W
- Country: United States
- State: California
- County: San Mateo

Area
  - Total: 16.7 sq mi (43.3 km^{2})
  - Land: 16.7 sq mi (43.3 km^{2})
  - Water: 0 sq mi (0 km^{2})
- Elevation: 66 ft (20 m)

Population (2010)
  - Total: 214
- 2010 United States census
- Time zone: UTC-8 (PST)
  - Summer (DST): UTC-7 (PDT)
- ZIP code: 94074
- Area code: 650
- FIPS code: 06-67084
- GNIS feature ID: 1659577

San Gregorio (Spanish for "St. Gregory") is an unincorporated community in San Mateo County, California, United States, with a population of 214 people. It is located in the San Francisco Bay Area, south of Half Moon Bay. Just east of Highway 1, it is one mile (1.6 km) inland on Highway 84, from San Gregorio State Beach. It is also located 7 miles (11 km) north of Pescadero via Stage Road and 8 miles (13 km) west of La Honda via SR 84.

== Climate ==
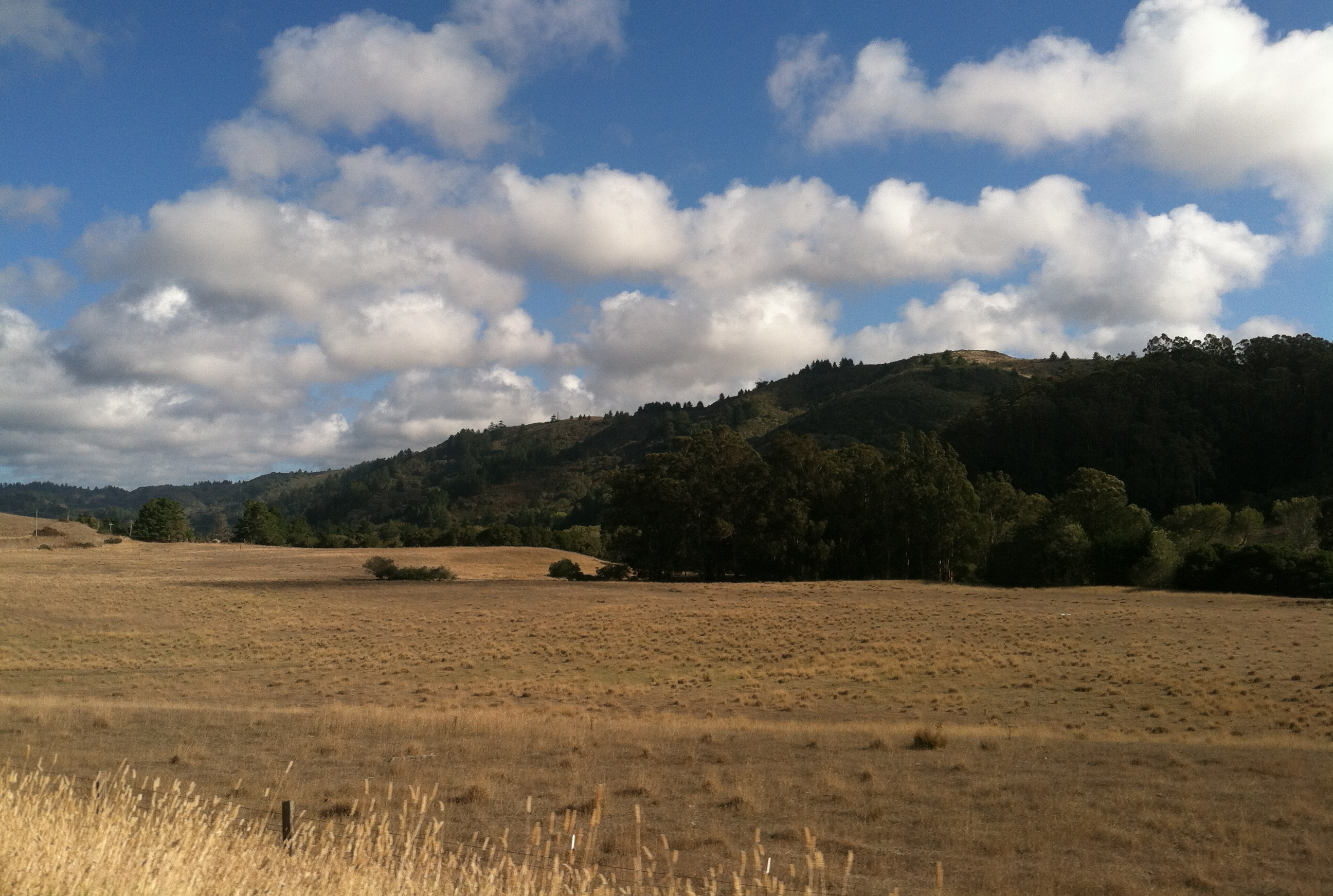
Highway 84 a little ways east of San Gregorio in September 2013, during California's dry season.

San Gregorio has a cool summer Mediterranean climate (Köppen climate classification Csb).

A National Weather Service cooperative weather station has been in operation in San Gregorio since June 1, 1954. San Gregorio enjoys mild weather throughout the year, except for some remarkably chilly mornings, even in the summer. Fog and low overcast are common in the night and morning hours, too, especially in the summer. The fog usually clears to the shoreline by the afternoon. Temperatures are often much warmer just a few miles inland than on the coast. Most of the rainfall falls from November through April.

Normal annual precipitation is 29.52 inches (75.0 cm). San Gregorio has an average of 92.3 days with measurable rain. The wettest year on record was 1983 when 57.86 inches (147.0 cm) of rain fell. The wettest month recorded was 12.13 inches (30.8 cm) in February 1998. The maximum 24-hour rainfall was 6.87 inches (17.4 cm) on December 23, 1955. Although snow is very rare in the coastal lowlands, 4.0 inches (10 cm) fell in San Gregorio on January 21, 1962.

January is the coolest month with an average high of 60.1 °F (15.6 °C) and an average low of 40.3 °F (4.6 °C). September is the warmest month with an average high of 72.5 °F (22.5 °C) and an average low of 49.3 °F (9.6 °C). The highest temperature on record was 99 °F (37 °C) on October 5, 1987. The lowest temperature on record was 20 °F (−7 °C) on December 20, 1998. Temperatures exceed 90 °F (32 °C) on an average of only 1.8 days, but have occurred in April, May, June, July, August, September, and October. Freezing temperatures 32 °F (0 °C) or below are more common, occurring on an average of 13.1 days, and have been recorded in all months except July, August and September.

Climate data for San Gregorio, California
Month	Jan	Feb	Mar	Apr	May	Jun	Jul	Aug	Sep	Oct	Nov	Dec	Year
Record high °F (°C)	81 (27)	82 (28)	85 (29)	91 (33)	95 (35)	97 (36)	94 (34)	94 (34)	98 (37)	99 (37)	89 (32)	88 (31)	99 (37)
Mean daily maximum °F (°C)	58.9 (14.9)	59.9 (15.5)	60.5 (15.8)	62.2 (16.8)	64.0 (17.8)	67.2 (19.6)	69.3 (20.7)	70.1 (21.2)	71.4 (21.9)	68.6 (20.3)	63.5 (17.5)	59.4 (15.2)	64.6 (18.1)
Daily mean °F (°C)	49.3 (9.6)	50.6 (10.3)	51.0 (10.6)	52.2 (11.2)	54.8 (12.7)	57.6 (14.2)	59.7 (15.4)	60.3 (15.7)	60.0 (15.6)	56.9 (13.8)	52.7 (11.5)	49.5 (9.7)	54.6 (12.5)
Mean daily minimum °F (°C)	39.8 (4.3)	41.3 (5.2)	41.5 (5.3)	42.3 (5.7)	45.6 (7.6)	48.0 (8.9)	50.1 (10.1)	50.5 (10.3)	48.7 (9.3)	45.3 (7.4)	41.8 (5.4)	39.7 (4.3)	44.6 (7.0)
Record low °F (°C)	23 (−5)	23 (−5)	27 (−3)	29 (−2)	31 (−1)	32 (0)	37 (3)	38 (3)	35 (2)	29 (−2)	27 (−3)	20 (−7)	20 (−7)
Average precipitation inches (mm)	5.66 (144)	5.08 (129)	4.25 (108)	2.27 (58)	0.86 (22)	0.33 (8.4)	0.11 (2.8)	0.18 (4.6)	0.41 (10)	1.55 (39)	3.49 (89)	5.24 (133)	29.43 (747.8)
Average precipitation days (≥ 0.01 in)	12	12	12	9	6	4	3	3	3	6	10	11	91
Source: Western Regional Climate Center

== History ==
Once this was Ohlone country, where the Portola Expedition found the native people to be most gracious, offering food and guidance. The name "Ohlone", derived from for the Oljon tribe living on a Spanish rancho. The Oljon themselves lived on the lower drainages of San Gregorio Creek and Pescadero Creek. Village names mentioned in Mission Dolores records include Zucigim and Pructaca. Their headman was Lachi or Lachigi, a man with four co-wives. People from this group who went to Mission Santa Clara were lumped together as “San Bernardino” people, with all other people from the Santa Cruz mountains and coast. Cross-references to Mission Dolores relatives suggest that they were the same people as the Solchequis subgroup of “San Bernardino” people at Santa Clara. Estimates of the pre-mission Oljon population was 157 people.

The first European land exploration of Alta California, the Spanish Portolà expedition, passed through the area on its way north, camping for three days near today's San Gregorio, October 24–26, 1769. Franciscan missionary Juan Crespi noted in his diary on Tuesday October 24, "…we came to a small valley where there is a good-sized village of very fine, very well-behaved, fair and beaded heathens who received us with a great deal of hospitality and pleasure. They have the village close to shore, about a half league from where we stopped, where they have a great many grass houses at an opening at this valley here makes onto the shore; they are living now in the valley. Here in the valley there is a great deal of soil, and a stream in midst with a good-sized flow of delicious water, on its way to empty into the sea at where they have the village. A good amount of irrigation could be managed with this water; there are, in addition to the alley, the ranges of knolls, all of them good soil for dry farming. Wood there is none of; the mountain range, however, lies nearby with a great deal of savin timber. A good spot for a good-sized mission; I named it Nuestro padre Santo Domingo, Our Father Saint Dominic." No mission was ever established here, however. The string of Spanish Missions established over the next 50 years followed a more inland route through San Jose. During the Mexican era, the area was part of Rancho San Gregoria.

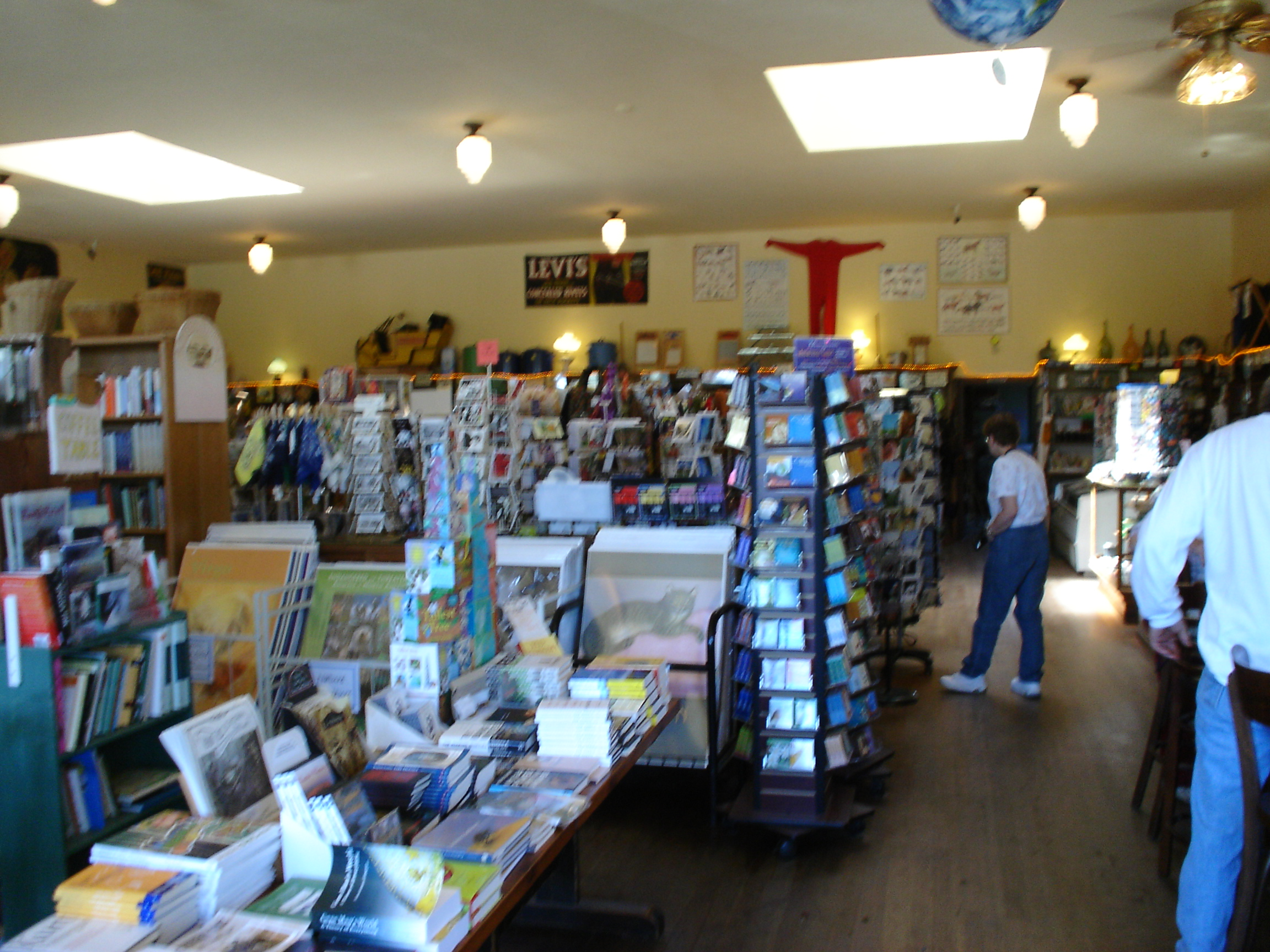
Interior of San Gregorio General Store

Named after Pope Gregory I (Saint Gregory the Great). San Gregorio was a booming town in the 1850s, when wealthy San Franciscans would travel to the San Gregorio House by stagecoach to enjoy fishing, hunting, sea bathing, and boat races. The building still stands, but is no longer a functioning hotel. In the nineteenth century, a Chinese community had lived along the creek which runs through San Gregorio however, the buildings of the former community were washed away due to heavy rains. The San Gregorio General Store has been operating since 1889. The original stagecoach stop stands across Highway 84 from the store. In 1915, the community was home to seven cheese factories. San Gregorio has been the site of several film locations and television show episode scenes.
