= Montara Creek =

Creek in San Mateo County, California

Montara Creek is a creek in San Mateo County that flows from Montara Mountain. It has a bend in the middle. Above the bend it flows north–south parallel to Sunshine Valley Road and Elm Street, while below the bend it forms a natural border between Montara and Moss Beach.
