= Montara, California =

Montara
- census-designated place
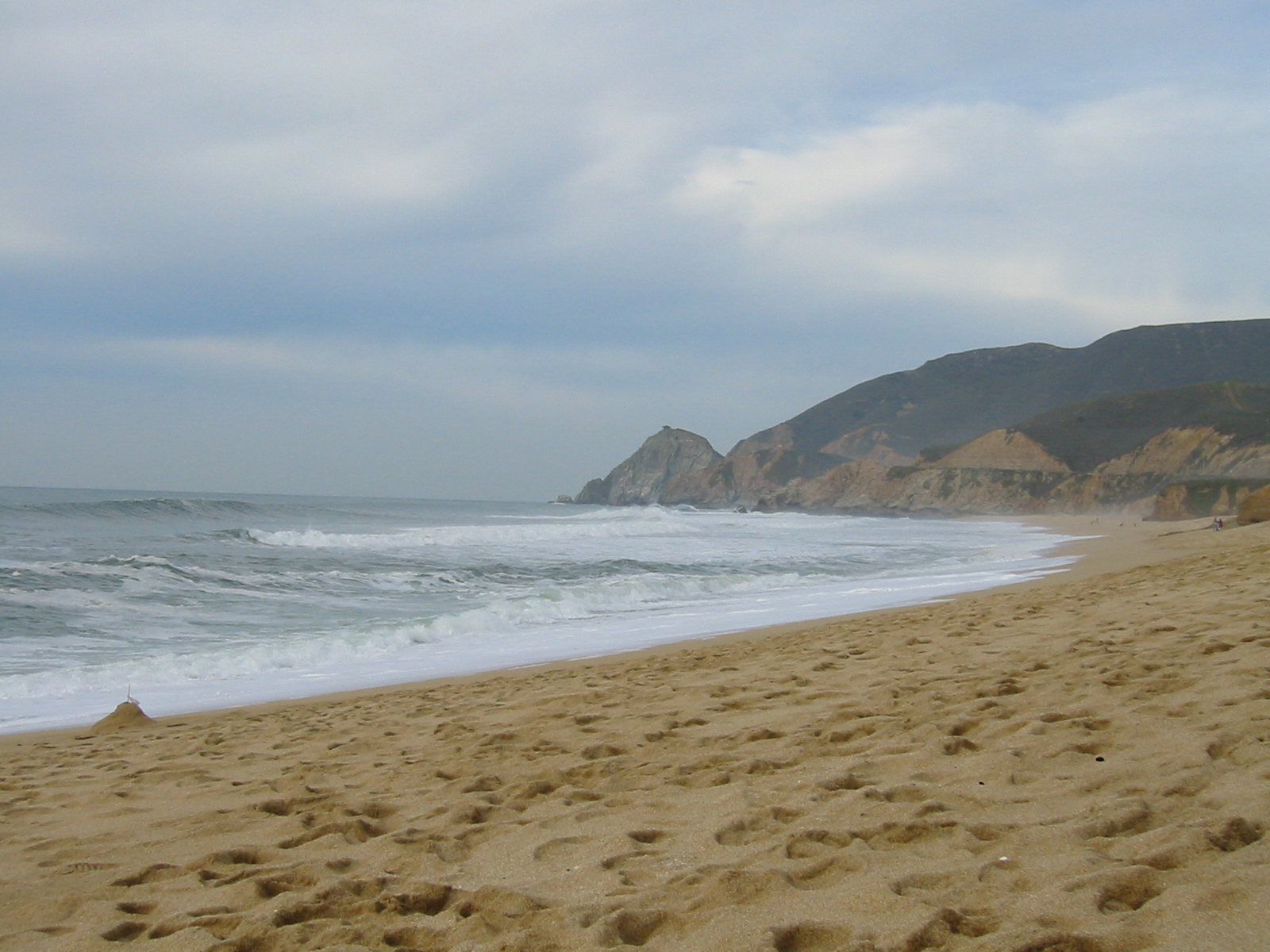
- Montara State Beach in Montara

- Location in San Mateo County and the state of California

- Location in the United States
- Coordinates: 37°32′23″N 122°30′23″W
- Country: United States
- State: California
- County: San Mateo

Area
  - Total: 3.877 sq mi (10.041 km^{2})
  - Land: 3.877 sq mi (10.041 km^{2})
  - Water: 0 sq mi (0 km^{2}) 0%
- Elevation: 98 ft (30 m)

Population (2020)
  - Total: 2,833
  - Density: 730.7/sq mi (282.1/km^{2})
- Time zone: UTC-8 (PST)
  - Summer (DST): UTC-7 (PDT)
- ZIP code: 94037
- Area code: 650
- FIPS code: 06-48760
- GNIS feature ID: 0277558

Montara (/mɒnˈtærə/) is a census-designated place (CDP) in San Mateo County, California, United States. The population was 2,833 at the 2020 census. Nearby communities include Moss Beach and Princeton-by-the-Sea.

== Etymology ==
According to historical sources, the name "Montoro" was initially used, at least in 1867, for Montara Mountain and Montara Point by the Whitney Survey (also known as the California Geological Survey). In 1869, the United States Coast Survey referred to the area by its current name of Montara; the name is thought to be a misspelled interpretation of a Spanish word, or even a combination of several Spanish words for mountains or wilderness, such as montuoso (mountainous), montaraz (the wild) or the word for mountain, montaña. Additionally, the Spanish verb montar (meaning "to ride"), or one of its conjugated forms, could have influenced the name by referencing “riding” through or traversing the land on horseback or by wagon. Montará is a future-tense conjugation of "to ride", roughly becoming "will ride". This could have been further confused by non-Spanish speakers as sounding like "montaña" (mountain), interpreted as “riding the mountain”.

"Montara" could also refer to a corruption of the Spanish word "Montosa"; "Cañada Montosa" (valley of brush) was allegedly written on an 1838 design of Rancho San Pedro, located in Southern California, but the connections between this plan and the town are unclear.

== Geography and environment ==
Montara is located at 37°32′23″N 122°30′23″W (37.539639, -122.506426), approximately 20 miles (32 km) south of San Francisco and 50 miles (80 km) north of Santa Cruz, California. Neighboring towns include Pacifica to the north, Moss Beach, El Granada, and Half Moon Bay to the south. According to the United States Census Bureau, the CDP has a total area of 3.9 square miles (10 km^{2}), all land.

The rare and endangered species Hickman's potentilla occurs at the northern extremity of Montara on the slopes above Martini Creek at elevations ranging from 32 to 410 ft (9.8 to 125.0 m).

Nearby Montara Mountain, part of the Santa Cruz Mountains, rises to an elevation of 1,898 ft (579 m) above sea level. The mountain is accessible by a gravel fire road. On a few occasions light snowfall has fallen on the upper reaches of the mountain.

The town is surrounded by open space (Rancho Corral de Tierra) and a popular recreation area includes Montara State Beach. The nearly 1 mi (1.6 km) long stretch of sand drops steeply into the ocean, making this beach hazardous for swimming. It is, however, a fairly popular surfing destination for experienced surfers. Waves of at least 10–15 ft (3.0–4.6 m) can be common during winter storm swells.

Montara State Marine Reserve & Pillar Point State Marine Conservation Area extend offshore from Montara. Like underwater parks, these marine protected areas help conserve ocean wildlife and marine ecosystems.

== Climate ==
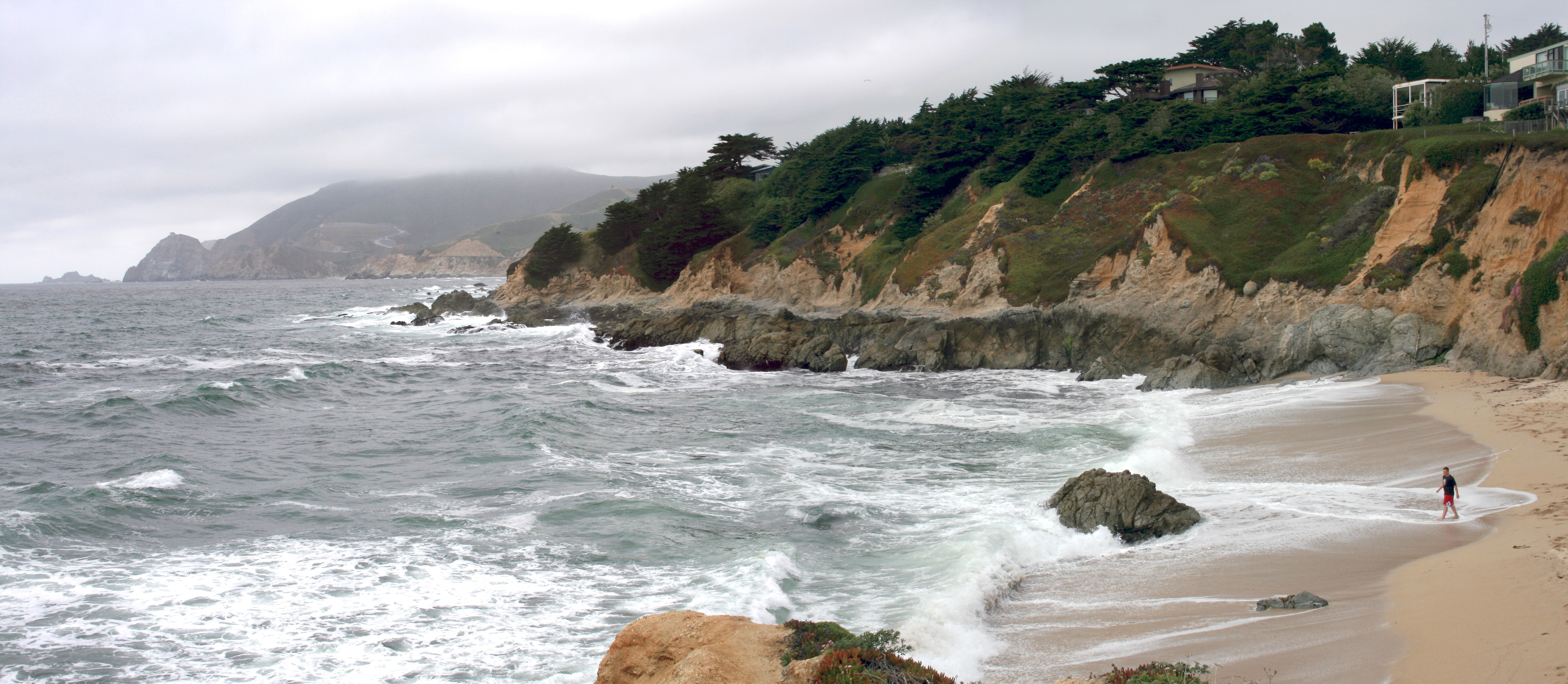
Point Montara Panorama, 2011

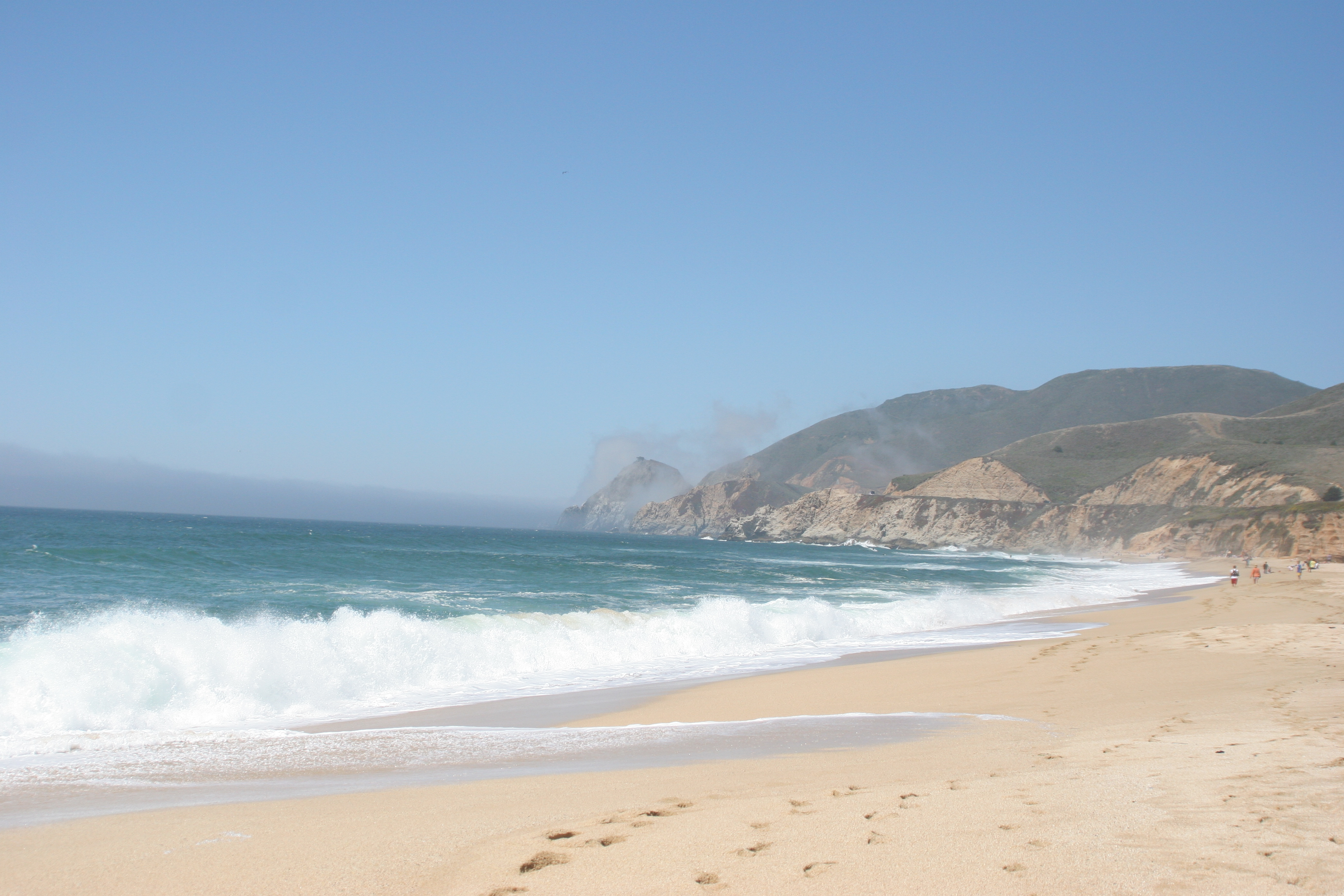
Panorama, Montara State Beach. Part of the former coastal route of CA-1, now a hike/bike trail, are visible. 2005 photo.

Montara enjoys exceptionally mild weather throughout the year. Typical of Northern California, most of the rainfall falls from November through April, normally totaling more than 27 in (690 mm). Due to its proximity to the Pacific Ocean, heavy fogs and low overcasts are common throughout the year, sometimes producing light drizzle. Stray showers sometimes occur during the mostly dry summer months. January, the coldest month, normally sees daytime high temperatures around 50°-60 °F (between 10° and 15 °C), with overnight lows in the forties (4°-10 °C). Freezing temperatures are extremely rare, especially near the ocean. September, the warmest month, normally experiences daytime highs in the upper sixties (15°-21 °C) and lows in the lower fifties (around 10 °C). Temperatures rarely exceed 90 °F (32 °C), and, whenever there are daytime temperatures above 80 °F (27 °C), the overall temperate still cools into the fifties (~13 °C) at night. During experimental observations by a U.S. Geological Survey volunteer (from 1985 to 1989), the highest temperature was an amazing 100 °F (38 °C), and the lowest was 31 °F (−1 °C). The nearest official National Weather Service station is at Half Moon Bay. Recently, an automated weather station was set up in Montara, providing regular observations on the National Weather Service's website, weather.gov.

== Demographics ==
=== 2020 census ===
As of the 2020 census, Montara had a population of 2,833 and a population density of 730.7 inhabitants per square mile (282.1/km^{2}).

The median age was 49.2 years. The age distribution was 18.6% under the age of 18, 5.5% aged 18 to 24, 20.7% aged 25 to 44, 31.8% aged 45 to 64, and 23.4% who were 65 years of age or older. For every 100 females, there were 88.5 males, and for every 100 females age 18 and over there were 86.7 males age 18 and over.

The census reported that 98.9% of the population lived in households, 0.6% lived in non-institutionalized group quarters, and 0.6% were institutionalized. In total, 93.0% of residents lived in urban areas, while 7.0% lived in rural areas.

There were 1,070 households, out of which 27.6% had children under the age of 18 living in them. Of all households, 62.6% were married-couple households, 11.1% were households with a male householder and no spouse or partner present, and 21.1% were households with a female householder and no spouse or partner present. 17.5% of households were one person, and 8.3% had someone living alone who was 65 years of age or older. The average household size was 2.62.

There were 1,116 housing units, of which 95.9% were occupied. Of occupied units, 80.6% were owner-occupied and 19.4% were occupied by renters. The homeowner vacancy rate was 0.3% and the rental vacancy rate was 3.3%.

Racial composition as of the 2020 census
| Race | Number | Percent |
|---|---|---|
| White | 2,160 | 76.2% |
| Black or African American | 14 | 0.5% |
| American Indian and Alaska Native | 14 | 0.5% |
| Asian | 133 | 4.7% |
| Native Hawaiian and Other Pacific Islander | 5 | 0.2% |
| Some other race | 117 | 4.1% |
| Two or more races | 390 | 13.8% |
| Hispanic or Latino (of any race) | 388 | 13.7% |

=== Income and poverty ===
In 2023, the US Census Bureau estimated that the median household income was $201,367, and the per capita income was $94,639. About 0.0% of families and 3.6% of the population were below the poverty line.

=== 2010 census ===
The 2010 United States census reported that Montara had a population of 2,909. The population density was 750.1 inhabitants per square mile (289.6/km^{2}). The racial makeup of Montara was 2,491 (85.6%) White, 16 (0.6%) African American, 21 (0.7%) Native American, 142 (4.9%) Asian, 1 (0.0%) Pacific Islander, 97 (3.3%) from other races, and 141 (4.8%) from two or more races. Hispanic or Latino of any race were 324 persons (11.1%).

The Census reported that 2,909 people (100% of the population) lived in households, 0 (0%) lived in non-institutionalized group quarters, and 0 (0%) were institutionalized.

There were 1,109 households, out of which 351 (31.7%) had children under the age of 18 living in them, 666 (60.1%) were opposite-sex married couples living together, 77 (6.9%) had a female householder with no husband present, 46 (4.1%) had a male householder with no wife present. There were 59 (5.3%) unmarried opposite-sex partnerships, and 17 (1.5%) same-sex married couples or partnerships. 209 households (18.8%) were made up of individuals, and 72 (6.5%) had someone living alone who was 65 years of age or older. The average household size was 2.62. There were 789 families (71.1% of all households); the average family size was 3.02.

The population was spread out, with 617 people (21.2%) under the age of 18, 169 people (5.8%) aged 18 to 24, 622 people (21.4%) aged 25 to 44, 1,145 people (39.4%) aged 45 to 64, and 356 people (12.2%) who were 65 years of age or older. The median age was 46.0 years. For every 100 females, there were 92.5 males. For every 100 females age 18 and over, there were 90.0 males.

There were 1,167 housing units at an average density of 300.9 per square mile (116.2/km^{2}), of which 898 (81.0%) were owner-occupied, and 211 (19.0%) were occupied by renters. The homeowner vacancy rate was 0.9%; the rental vacancy rate was 5.3%. 2,409 people (82.8% of the population) lived in owner-occupied housing units and 500 people (17.2%) lived in rental housing units.

== Government ==
In the California State Legislature, Montara is in the 13th senatorial district, represented by Democrat Josh Becker, and in the 23rd Assembly district, represented by Democrat Marc Berman.

In the United States House of Representatives, Montara is in California's 16th congressional district, represented by Democrat Sam Liccardo.

Montara is an unincorporated community. All planning and zoning is the responsibility of the San Mateo County Board of Supervisors, which is elected at large by the voters of San Mateo County. The Midcoast Community Council is an elected advisory body to the Board of Supervisors, is chosen by residents of Montara, Moss Beach, and El Granada.

Montara is also part of the Cabrillo Unified School District, Coastside Fire Protection District, Montara Water and Sanitary District, and the Midpeninsula Regional Open Space District. Because it is in the coastal zone, Montara is under the jurisdiction of the California Coastal Commission.

== History ==
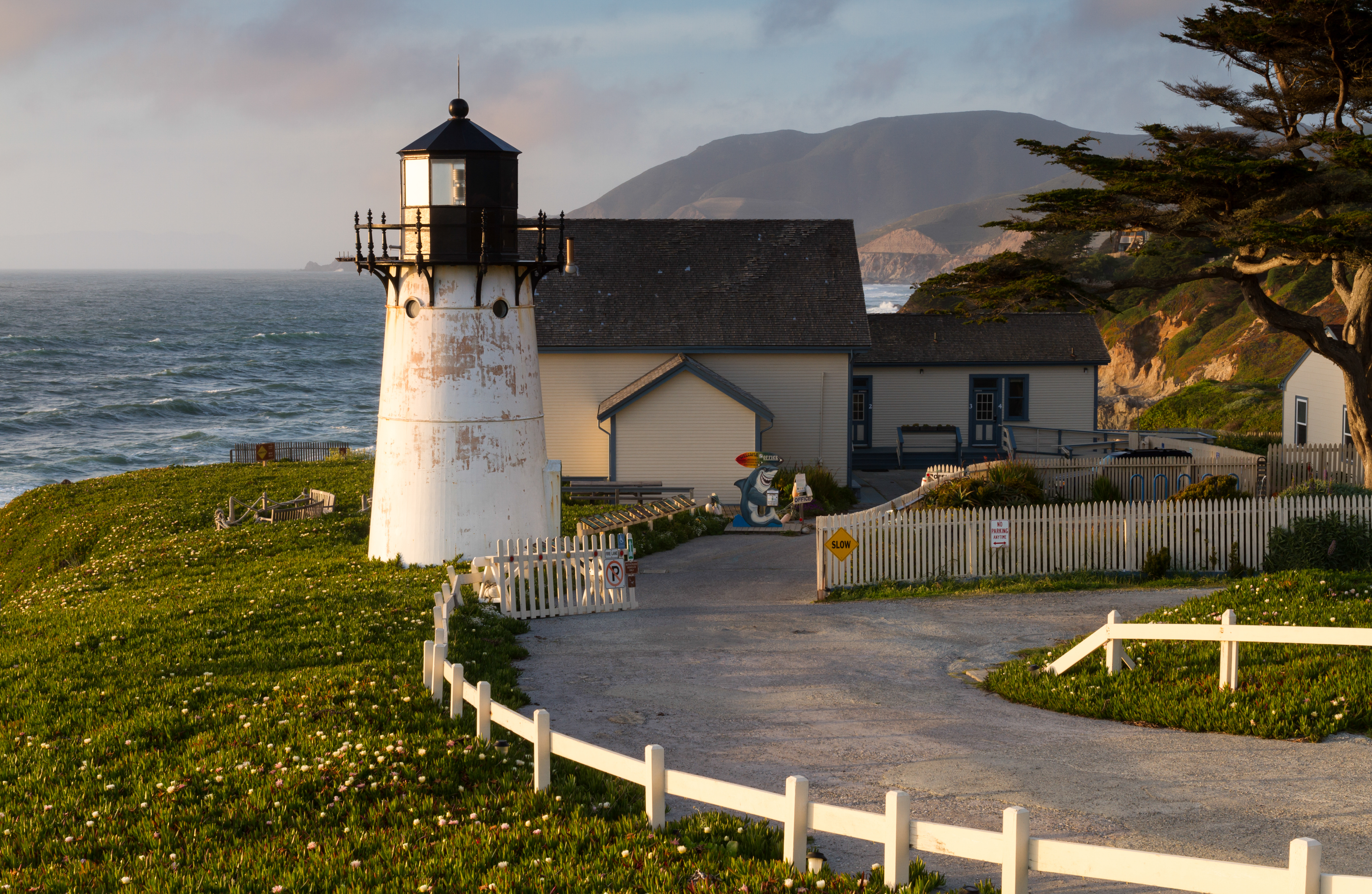
Point Montara Light in 2013

A lighthouse was established at Point Montara in 1875. The Montara area was first settled by farmers in the late nineteenth century. A commercial flower farm, still in operation, was established in 1900. In 1905, Montara became a stop on the new Ocean Shore Railroad, then under construction. The railroad built a hotel next to the train station. The trains encouraged weekend visitors to the area, but development of the community was very slow. The railroad went bankrupt and ceased operations in 1920, but the hotel remained and, although greatly remodeled, is still standing today, between State Route 1 and Main Street, next to the remodeled train station.

The Montara Grammar School opened in 1915; the historic two-story building still stands, serving as a community center. The newer Farallone View Elementary School, a few blocks north of the original school, services the town's children today.

California's second paved highway, Pedro Mountain Road, was completed in 1914, providing another connection between Montara and San Francisco. This highway was replaced in 1937 by State Route 1, which followed the old railroad route through the Devil's Slide. A tunnel was opened in 2013 to replace this dangerous route, which had been closed periodically due to landslides. The United States Navy operated an anti-aircraft training center at Point Montara during World War II.

Real growth in Montara began in the 1950s as more people moved away from San Francisco during the postwar boom. As Montara has continued to grow, the community has still maintained its generally rural image. Most of Montara's streets were dirt or gravel until the early 1990s; the rustic quality of the town has not been lost since the streets were oiled or paved (most of the streets are now paved).

== Notable ==
Point Montara Lighthouse, Montara, California. Photo by Carol M. Highsmith. The old Keeper's residence now serves as an International Hostel.

In 2003, Montara Water and Sanitary District purchased its water system from the German industrial firm RWE. Montara and Moss Beach residents overwhelmingly supported a bond for the purchase and repair of the system. The high, spiraling rates and a decades-long water moratorium were key motivations behind the bond measure.

Point Montara Light is a lighthouse in Montara, located just west of the Cabrillo Highway at Point Montara. Montara Light was originally established in 1875 as a fog signal station after several ships ran ashore in the late 1860s. The cast-iron lighthouse was brought from Wellfleet Harbor, Cape Cod, Massachusetts in 1925. It continues to operate as an aid-to-navigation maintained by the U.S. Coast Guard. The lighthouse demarks the northern point of the Fitzgerald Marine Reserve, a holding of Special Biological Significance owned by the State of California. The lighthouse grounds also serve for an international hostel, Point Montara Lighthouse.

Chart House Restaurant (since 1913), site of Bandits (2001).

== Transportation ==
Primary road access is via State Route 1 (the Cabrillo Highway) from the north and south.

SamTrans route 117 provides service to Montara with service from Linda Mar in Pacifica to Half Moon Bay.
