= Tom Lantos Tunnels =

Tunnels

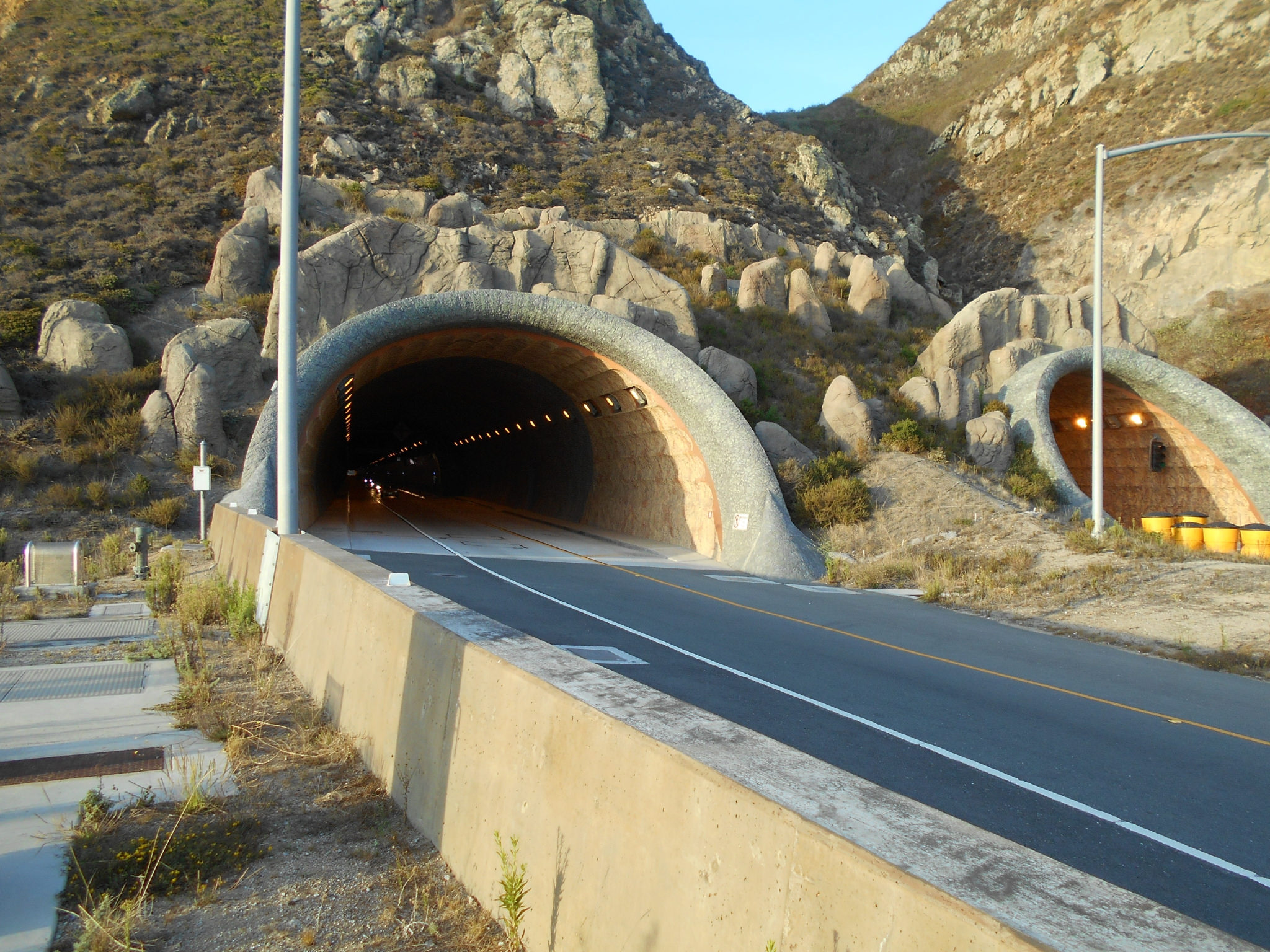
- Northbound tunnel entrances

Overview
- Location: Near Pacifica, California
- Coordinates: 37.5772°N 122.5125°W
- Status: Complete
- Route: SR 1 (Cabrillo Highway)

Operation
- Work began: May 6, 2005
- Constructed: 2005–2013
- Opened: March 26, 2013
- Owner: State of California
- Operator: Caltrans
- Traffic: Automotive

Technical
- Length: 4,149 ft (1,265 m)
- No. of lanes: 1 per bore
- Operating speed: 45 mph (72 km/h)
- Max elevation: c. 30 m (98 ft) msl
- Min elevation: c. 20 m (66 ft) msl
- Tunnel clearance: 6.8 m (22 ft)
- Width: 9 m (30 ft)

The Tom Lantos Tunnels are two tunnels located within the coastal promontory of Montara Mountain, on the San Francisco Peninsula in California, United States, created to allow rerouting State Route 1 to avoid a portion of roadway known as Devil's Slide. They are officially named after late Congressman Tom Lantos, who was instrumental in securing funding for the project, but de facto named after their location.

The Devil's Slide tunnels, as they are usually called, are the second and third longest road tunnels in California at 4,149 ft (1,265 m) northbound, and 4,008 ft (1,222 m) southbound. By comparison the longest road tunnel currently in California, the Wawona Tunnel on Highway 41 in Yosemite National Park, is 4,233 ft (1,290 m).

== History ==
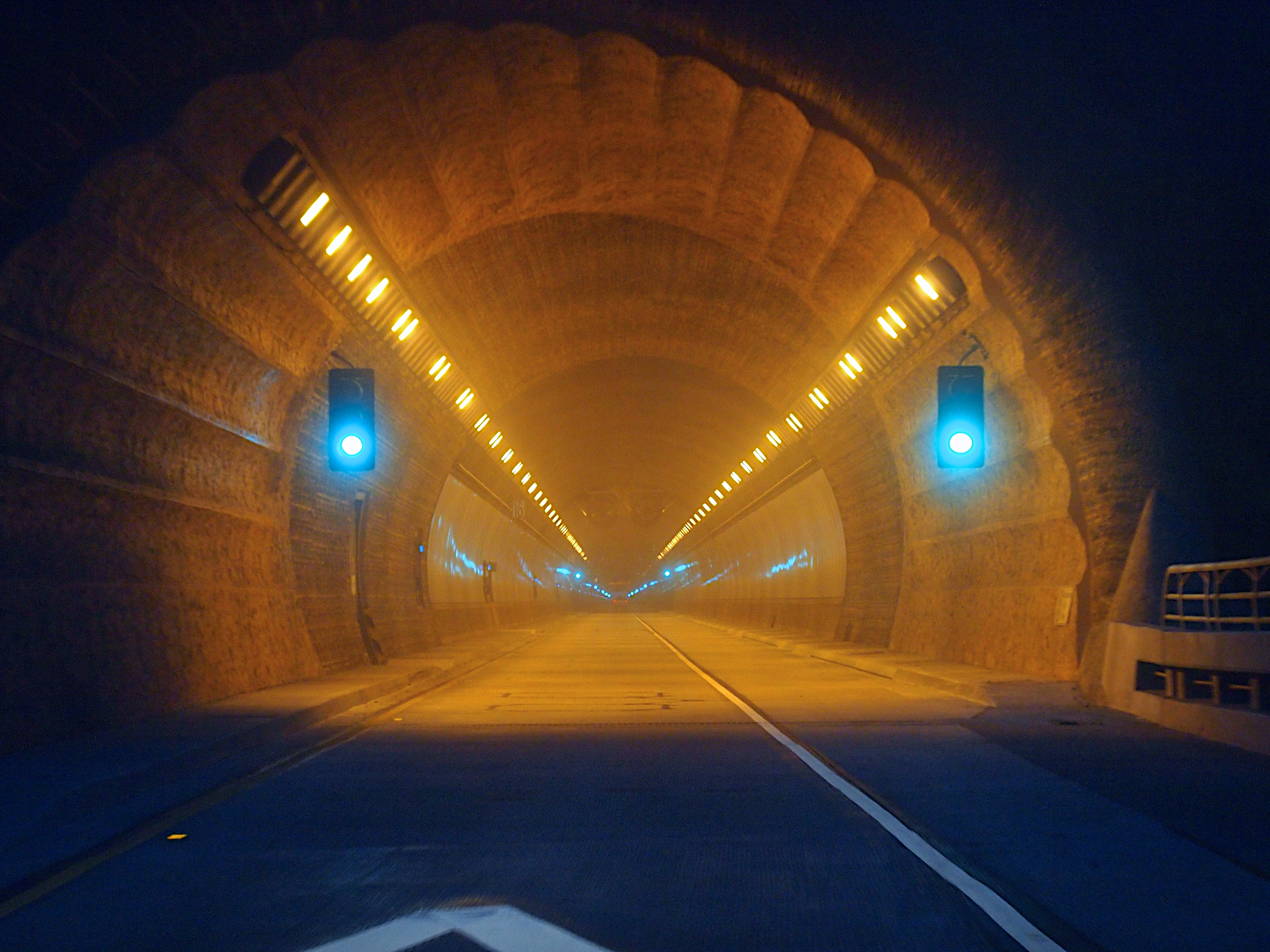
Interior of the tunnels

A bypass was proposed to be constructed to replace the 600-foot (180 m) stretch of highway. Beginning in 1958, California began the process to replace Devil's Slide with an inland route over Montara Mountain, known as the Martini Creek Bypass. The bypass bisected a section of McNee Ranch State Park, and was opposed by community and environmental groups. By 1975, 55% of the right-of-way had been acquired, when work on the proposed bypass was abandoned due to public opposition.

Most environmentalists supported a tunnel as a more environmentally sensitive alternative to the Martini Creek Bypass. A short tunnel built in 1908 by the Ocean Shore Railroad went through the area, but was destroyed during Prohibition, to keep it from being used by alcohol smugglers. The Sierra Club proposed building a tunnel to bypass the road in 1973. A Caltrans study in 1974 determined that a tunnel would be a viable alternative to the current road or a proposed inland freeway bypass. However, the state dropped the idea in the late 1970s.

A major slide in 1983 brought the problem to the public attention again. In 1985 Caltrans proposed the Martini Creek bypass as the preferred solution. However, the Sierra Club sued to stop construction, as California law requires that State Route 1 be restricted to two lanes in rural areas. The 101-foot-wide (31 m) road bed, complete with continuous uphill passing lanes, runaway truck ramps, and extra-wide shoulders, would be the widest two-lane road in the state. Again the state decided to return to the status quo.

A five-month outage caused by a slide in January 1995 again brought public scrutiny to the stretch of highway. In April, Caltrans documents were discovered that showed the agency had intentionally overestimated the costs of a tunnel, to support the freeway bypass. In July, the Federal Highway Administration ordered Caltrans to re-evaluate a tunnel to bypass Devil's Slide. On November 5, 1996, San Mateo County voters approved Measure T by 76%, changing the county's stated preference from construction of the bypass to construction of a tunnel. On November 9, Caltrans changed its position, supporting a bridge and tunnel as the best environmental, economic, and popular alternative to Devil's Slide.

Ground was broken for the new tunnel on May 6, 2005. Boring of twin 30-foot (9 m) diameter tunnels started September 17, 2007, and was completed in 2011. Breakthrough on the northern bore occurred on September 30, 2010. With the completion of the tunnels in 2013, the old Devil's Slide highway was converted into a trail for hikers and bicyclists. The tunnels opened to traffic on March 26, 2013.
