= Dean Creek (San Mateo County) =

Creek in San Mateo County, California

Dean Creek is a creek in San Mateo County, California. It flows west from the foothills of Montara Mountain until it reaches Sunshine Valley Road, which it then follows. It continues from the end of Sunshine Valley Road, cutting through the street grid of Moss Beach to its mouth near the mouth of San Vicente Creek. The Sunshine Valley/Dean Creek watershed is approximately 360 acres.
