= McNee Ranch State Park =

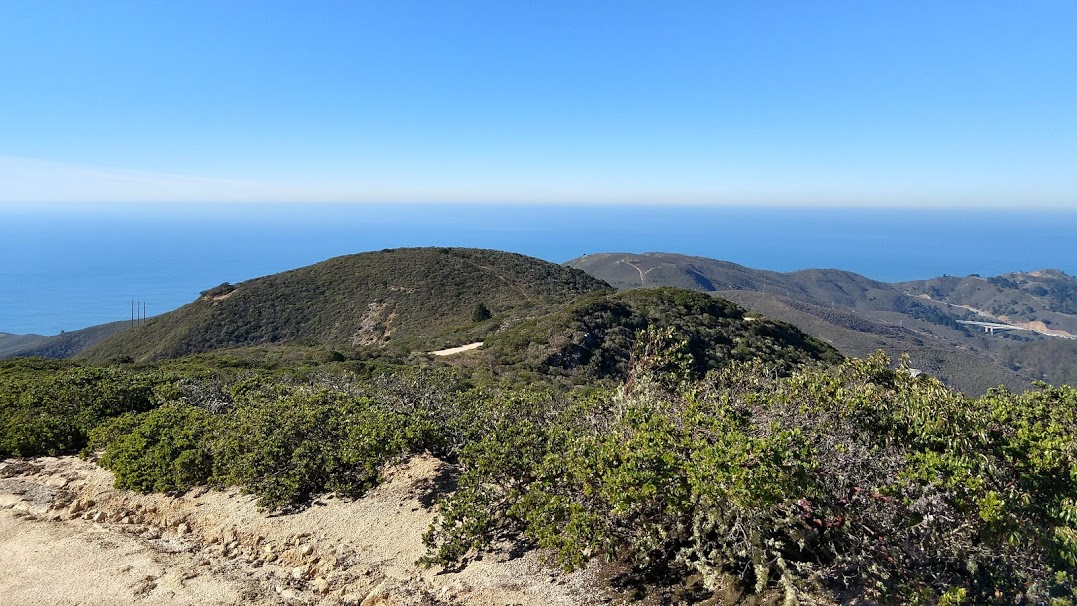
- Coastal view from a trail in McNee Ranch

- Location within California Location within the United States
- Location: Montara, California, USA
- Nearest city: Montara, California
- Coordinates: 37°33′31″N 122°30′03″W
- Area: 690 acres (280 ha)
- Governing body: California Department of Parks and Recreation

McNee Ranch is located in the Santa Cruz Mountains of the United States, near the unincorporated community of Montara, California in San Mateo County. The highest point in the 690-acre ranch rises to 1,898 feet above sea level. An unpaved fire road, the North Peak Access Road, accessible from the Pedro Mountain Road, provides access to the summit by hikers. The mountain has an extensive biodiversity especially on the serpentine soils of the lower slopes where such endangered species as Hickman's potentilla and San Mateo thornmint, Acanthomintha duttonii, are found. On rare occasions light snow has dusted the summit. On clear days the summit provides views of much of the San Francisco Bay Area.

The ranch is part of Montara State Beach.
