= Pedro Mountain Road =

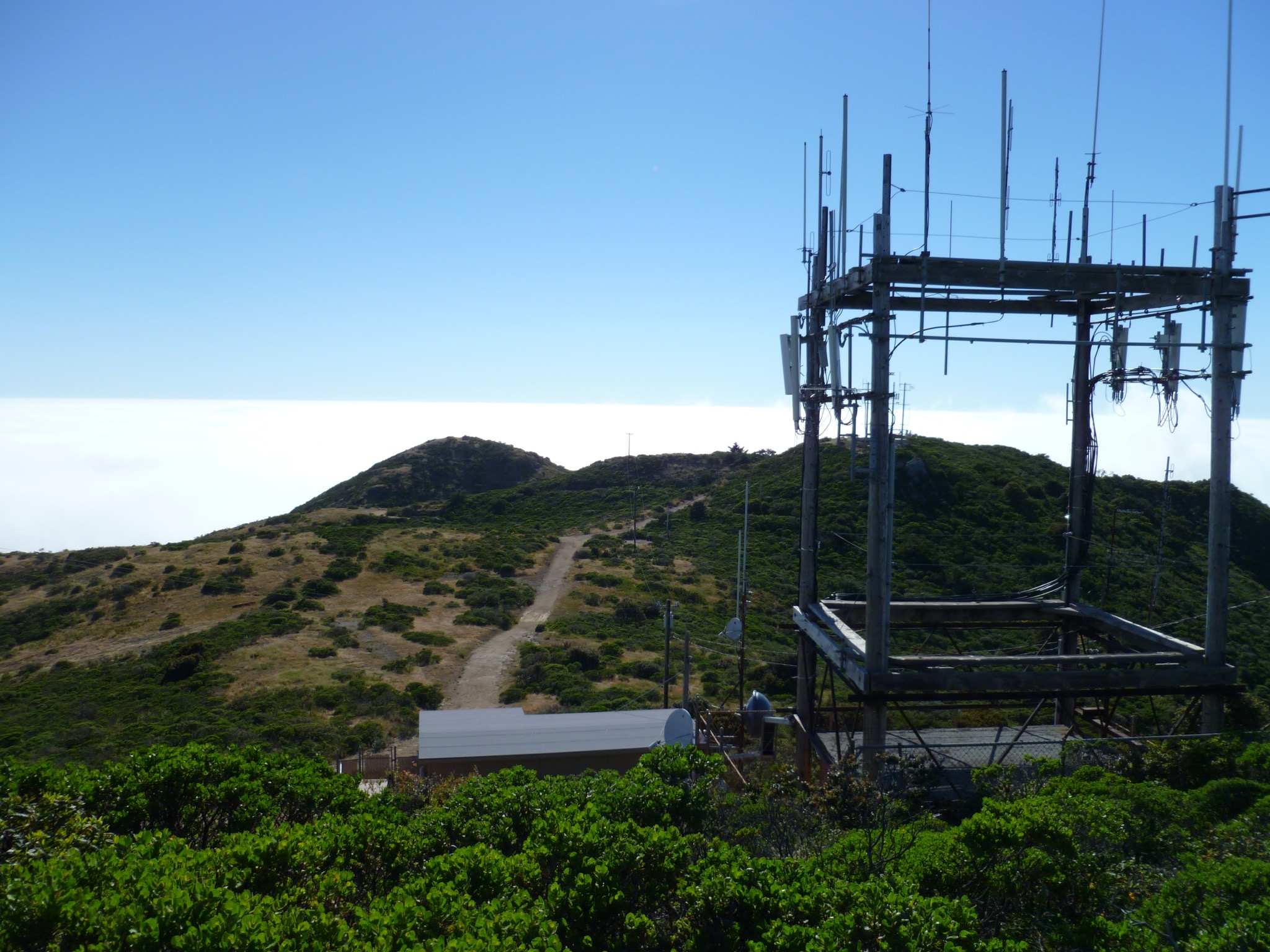
- Radio towers at Montara Mountain’s peak
- Length: 9.7 mi (15.6 km)
- Location: California, United States
- Trailheads: Higgins Way, Pacifica, California
- Use: bicycling, hiking, trail running, trail riding
- Highest point: Montara Mountain, 930 ft (280 m)
- Difficulty: Moderate
- Months: Year-round
- Sights: Pacific Ocean, Devil's Slide
- Hazards: Landslides, erosion

Pedro Mountain Road describes a series of historical road crossings of Pedro Mountain, a promontory ridge located between Montara Mountain and the coastal cliffs of Devil's Slide in San Mateo County, California. This Pedro Mountain headland blocks the easy passage of coastal travelers between the Pedro Valley in Pacifica, California and Montara, California. The most prominent of these Pedro Mountain roads was Coastside Boulevard, the 1914 to 1937 coastal highway 57, which remains in use today as part of the trail network of McNee Ranch State Park.

== History ==
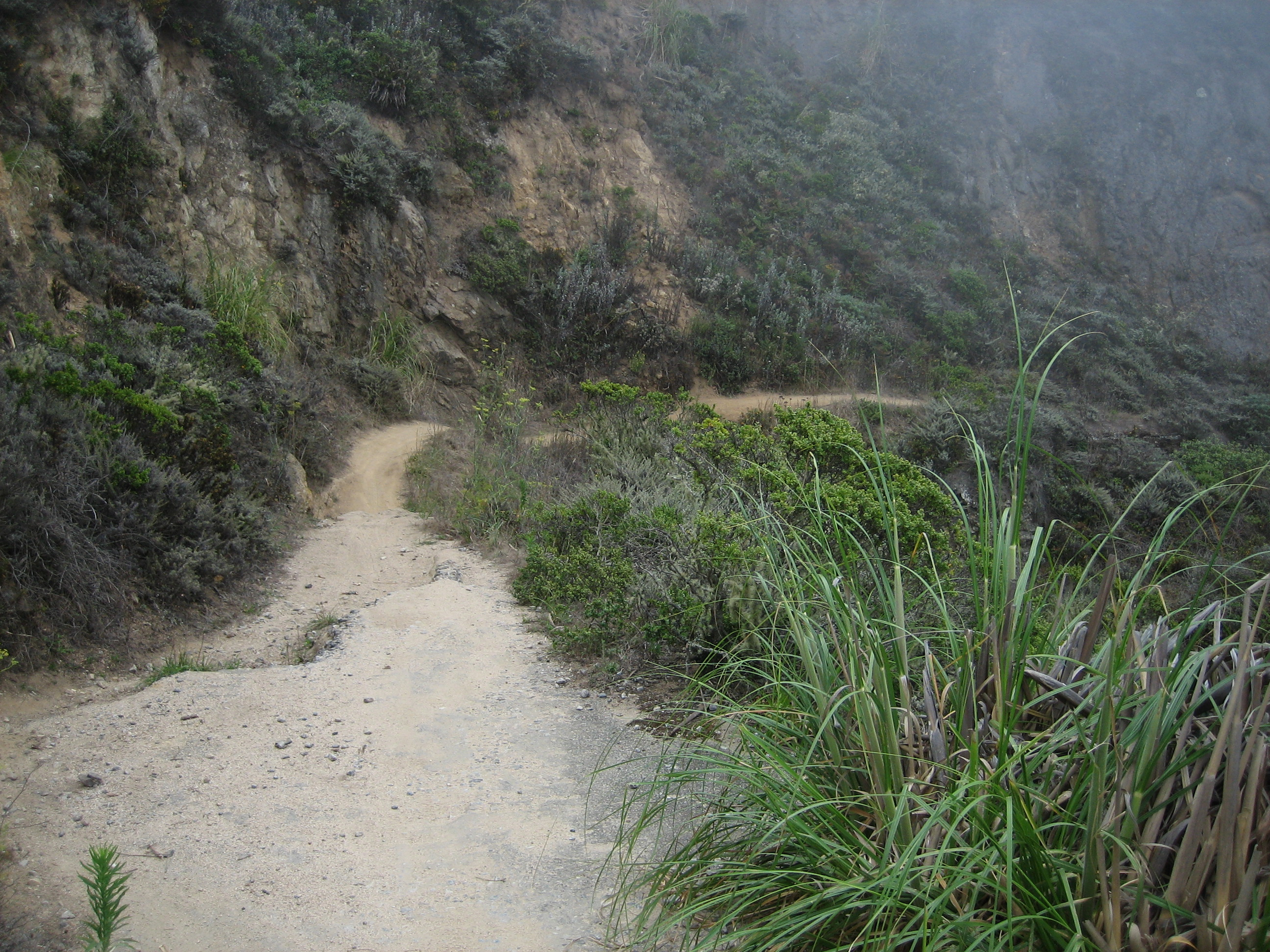
Pedro Mountain Road in 2007

The first historical record of the road crossing Pedro Mountain was in the journal of the Portola Expedition, October 1769. "...on a very bad road up over a high mountain...though easily climbed on the way up, had a very hard abrupt descent on the opposite side." This routing today is known as Indian Trail, running up from Martini Creek, over Saddle Pass and down the ridge into the present day Willow Brook Estates in the Linda Mar district of Pacifica. From 1848 until 1879 the routing, known as Road Trail, was changed to run east and west along the ridge of Pedro Mountain from Saddle Pass turning north and descending the ridge above Adobe Drive and on towards the Sanchez Adobe. From 1879 to 1914 the routing was changed entirely, called the Half Moon Bay - Colma Road, and transversed over the mountain closer to the ocean on very steep and rutted switchbacks from above the Shamrock Ranch towards Martini Creek. The steepest sections of this routing were virtually impassible to automobiles, with a grading of 24%. . From October 31, 1915, to June 1937 another new (paved) routing, called Coastside Boulevard (Highway 57) was routed up from Higgins Road in Pacifica, rising back towards Saddle Pass, and was welcomed as a much more automobile accessible routing. Remnants of this road are still passable to hikers, mountain bikers and horses and in the present day is called the 'Old Pedro Mountain Road'. Many cyclists have taken to unofficially calling it `Planet of the Apes`.

=== Half Moon Bay - Colma Road ===
Historical descriptions of Pedro Mountain Road highlight its narrow alignment, steep gradients of up to 25 percent, and sharp turns. Contemporary media, including a 1913 Motoring magazine report and local warning signs, warned motorists against using the route, advising travel via San Mateo instead. Vehicle wreckage in the surrounding ravines and vintage photographs document the hazards associated with the former roadway.

=== Ocean Shore Railroad ===
The Ocean Shore Railroad, which operated from 1907 to 1920, served as an alternative routing to the nearly impassible Half Moon Bay-Colma road routing. After the railroad ceased operations along the coast, the company was unable to reach a satisfactory agreement with the State of California to move the highway to the railroad's right-of-way. Eventually, when State Route 1 was completed, the state located most of the highway parallel to the right-of-way, even along the treacherous Devil's Slide.

=== Legislative Route 56 ===
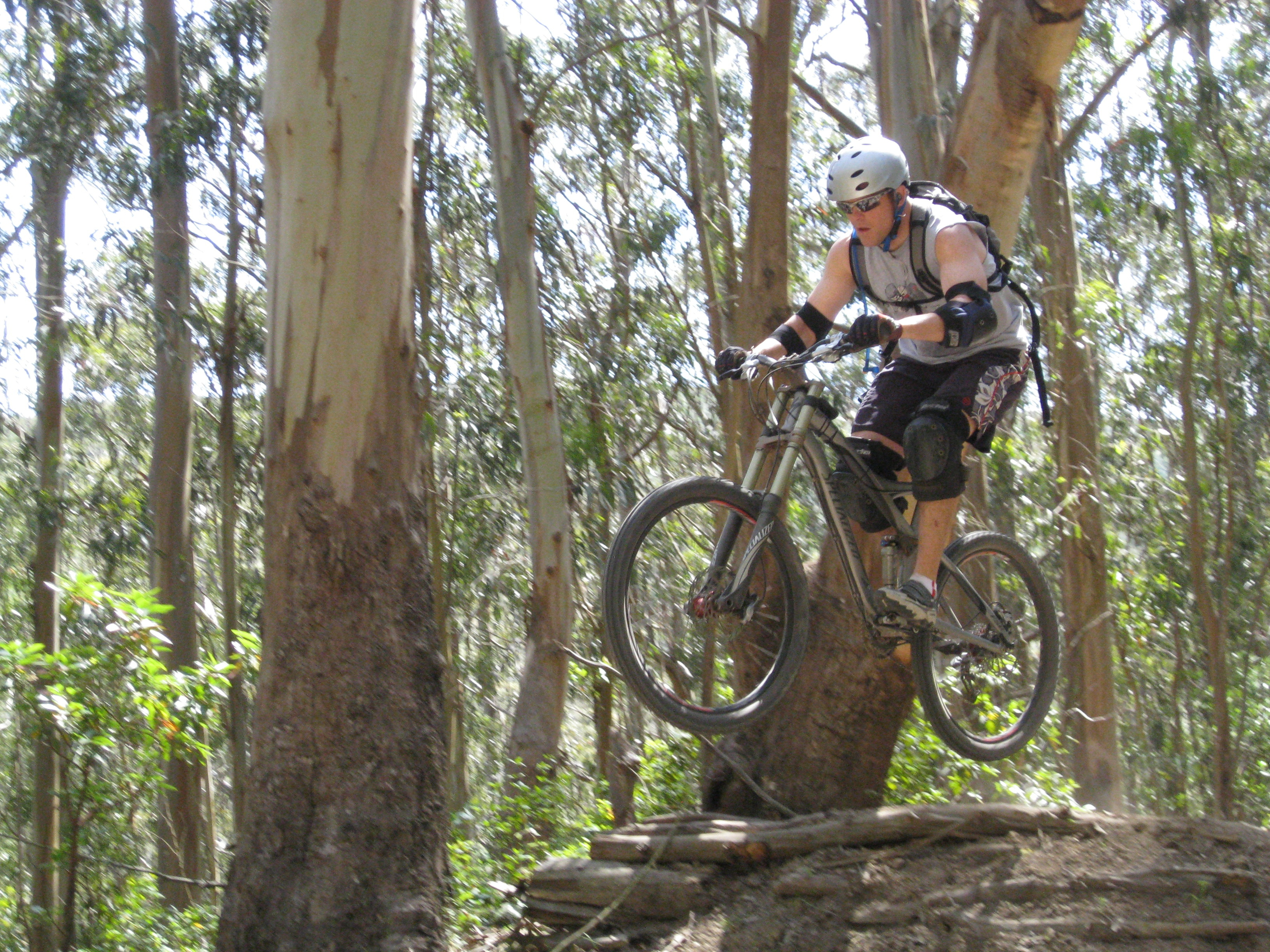
Mountain biker in 2009

In 1933, this section of roadway was coded into the highway system as Legislative Route 56. The next year in 1934 the highway would be signed as State Route 1 until the highway was rerouted along the Devil's Slide in 1937. This new routing replaced State Route 1 from 14th Street in Montara, to Rockaway Beach Avenue in Rockaway Beach (present day Pacifica) Portions of the crumbling pavement of Pedro Mountain Road can still be found between Montara and Pacifica. In some places, the roadbed has washed out or been partially buried by landslides. A short stub of the highway is still in use in Montara, near the local nursery. Nevertheless, the old routes are still accessible to hikers.

One longtime coastside resident, Charlie Nye Jr., recalled: "The road coming over Pedro Mountain was terrible, just awful. Words can’t describe it. It was just impossible. It went around turns and more turns, hairpin turns, short turns, backward turns. There were potholes on top of potholes. When you come down here today and complain about a few earth-slides on Devil’s Slide, well, that’s nothing compared to that old Pedro Mountain Road."

== The road today ==
Part of the road begins at a chain link fence at the existing stub in Montara and continues north to Martini Creek. The original bridge across the creek is gone, but a trail is available to the ranger's residence on the north side of the creek. The route continues to the northern park boundary beyond the Saddle Pass above Pacifica. Hikers will find the route moderate to rigorous, climbing to an elevation of 930 feet (280 m). The road continues on down into Pacifica to become the city's Higgins Way. Pedro Mountain Road intersects with the North Peak Access Road (which goes to the top of Montara Mountain), just before Green Valley.
