= Devil's Slide (California) =

Promontory in San Mateo County, California

Coordinates: 37.574383°N 122.520255°W

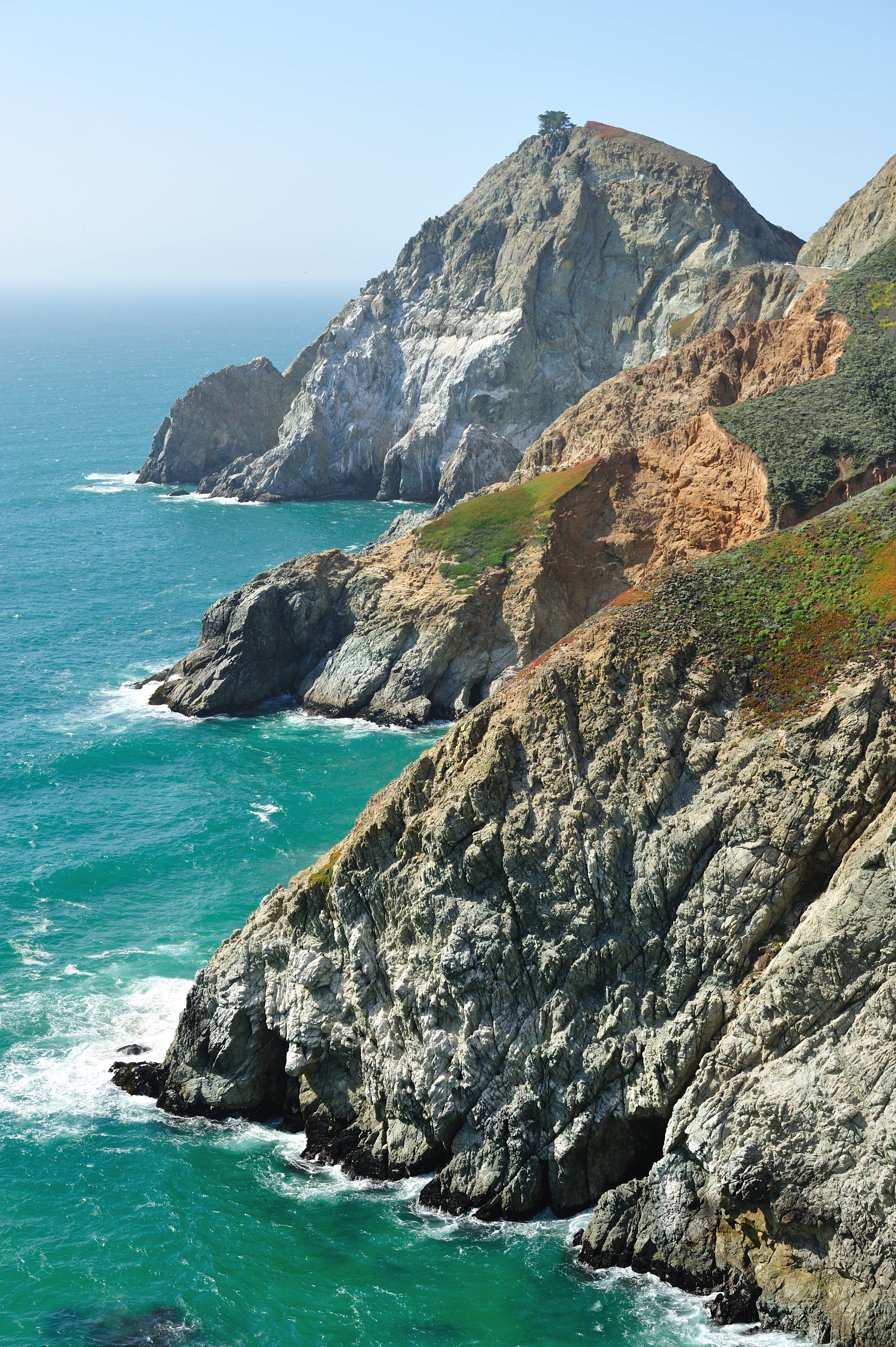
The sheer cliffs of the Devil's Slide promontory. A large area of slope failure is evident, marked by unweathered orange rocks and sharp truncations of vegetated areas.

Devil's Slide is a coastal promontory in California, United States. It lies on the San Mateo County coast between Pacifica and Montara. Its name comes from the rocky edges prone to slope failure.

== Natural setting ==
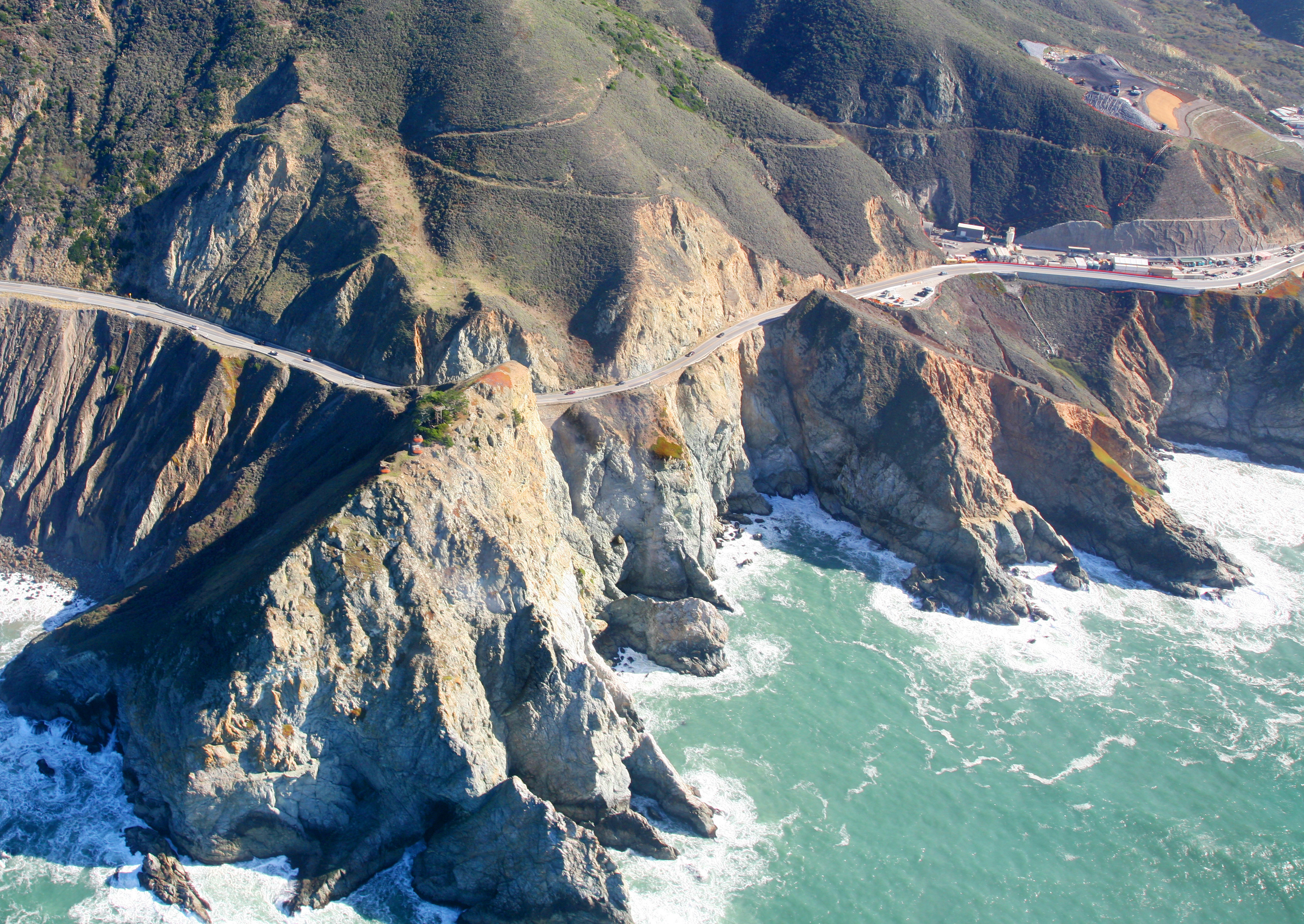
Devil's Slide (far left) with the southern portal of the Tom Lantos Tunnels (far right) under construction in late 2010. Note the steeply eroded cliffs immediately above and below Highway 1.

Devil's Slide is a name given to a steep, rocky coastal promontory located about midway between Montara and the Linda Mar District of Pacifica. The terrain is characterized by steep, eroded slopes with natural gradients ranging between 30 and 50%. There are small coastal valleys throughout along the major drainages within the Montara Mountain watershed. The soils in these valleys are deep and moderately well-drained and have developed along the low terraces and alluvial fans of the stream channels.

The climate of the area is Mediterranean with a strong maritime influence. The temperature range is narrow both seasonally and diurnally, while air moisture is relatively high. Extremely dense northern coastal scrub covers most of the locale, especially over San Pedro Mountain and along the steeper foot slopes of Montara Mountain. Small grassy openings and barren rocky areas are scattered throughout the scrub areas. The inland area holds other types of vegetation including aquatic and coastal freshwater marshes/seeps, willow riparian scrub, coastal grassland, non-native forest, and pasture/ranch uses/non-native brushland. The endangered species Hickman's potentilla occurs on the slopes above Martini Creek at up to 430 feet (130 m) elevation.

== Former State Route 1 ==
Immediately east of Devil's Slide is a former stretch of California State Route 1, famous for closures and landslides, which also was called "Devil's Slide". Construction of the road began in 1935 and was completed in 1936, replacing the steep, narrow, and winding Pedro Mountain Road. It was known for landslides and erosion that often occur during winter storms, sometimes making the road impassable.

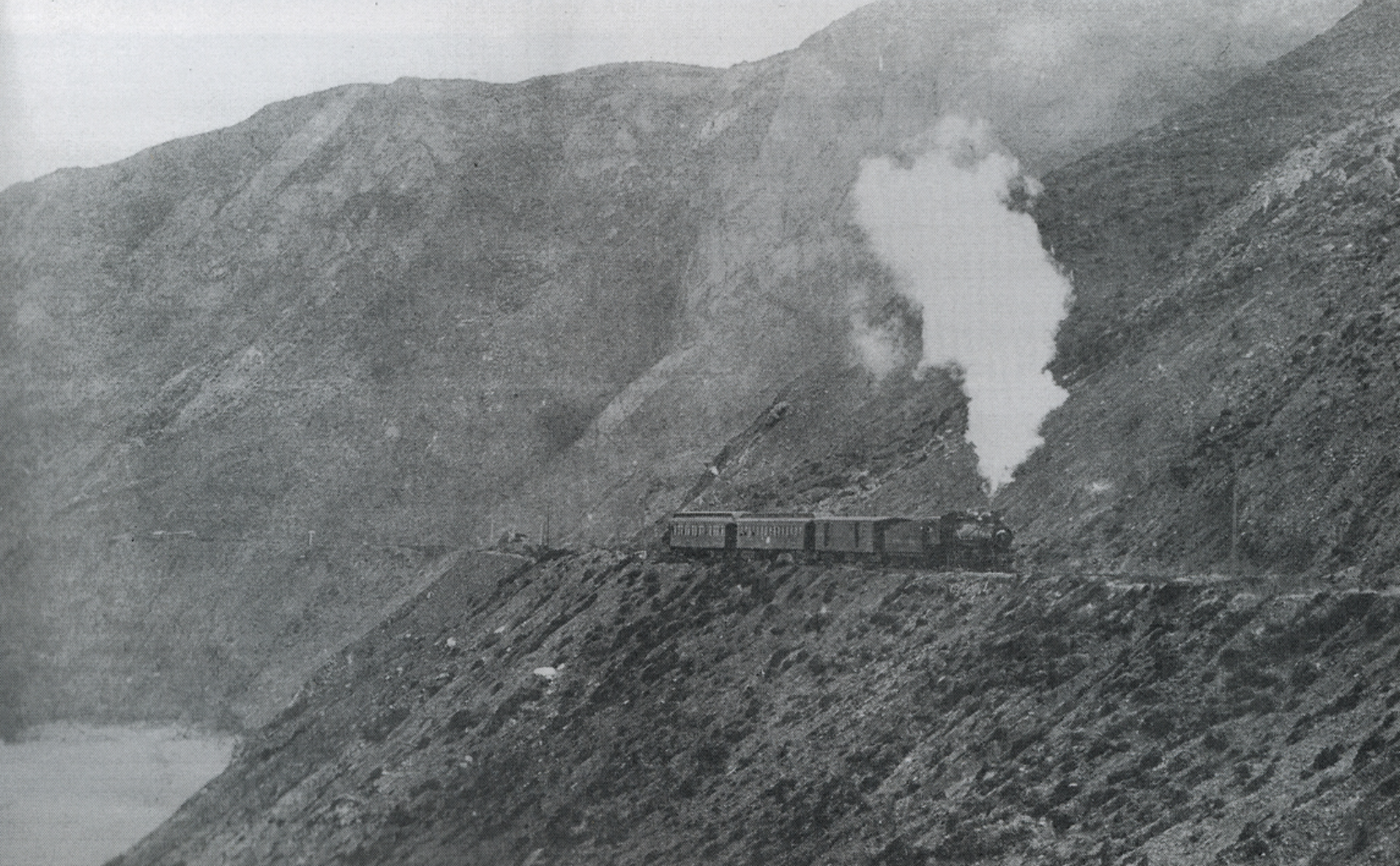
Ocean Shore Railroad along Devil's Slide, c. 1909

Devil's Slide was originally part of Ocean Shore Railroad that was proposed between San Francisco to Santa Cruz.

The first major landslide destroyed much of the road in 1940. Another large slide in 1995 forced the road's closure for almost two years. In April 2006, the road began to develop large longitudinal cracks in the roadbed, indicating an imminent slide and forcing the highway's closure for five months as Caltrans worked to stabilize the slide.

On March 25, 2013, Caltrans shut down the landslide-prone coastal road, replacing it with the Tom Lantos Tunnels, which take the highway through the promontory behind the precarious cliffs. On March 27, 2014, the 1.3-mile (2.1 km)-long Devil's Slide Trail was opened to pedestrians and bicyclists, taking over the section of roadway formerly used by State Route 1 and now bypassed by the new tunnels. The total cost to convert the highway into a trail was US$1,991,525 (equivalent to $2,753,000 in 2025).

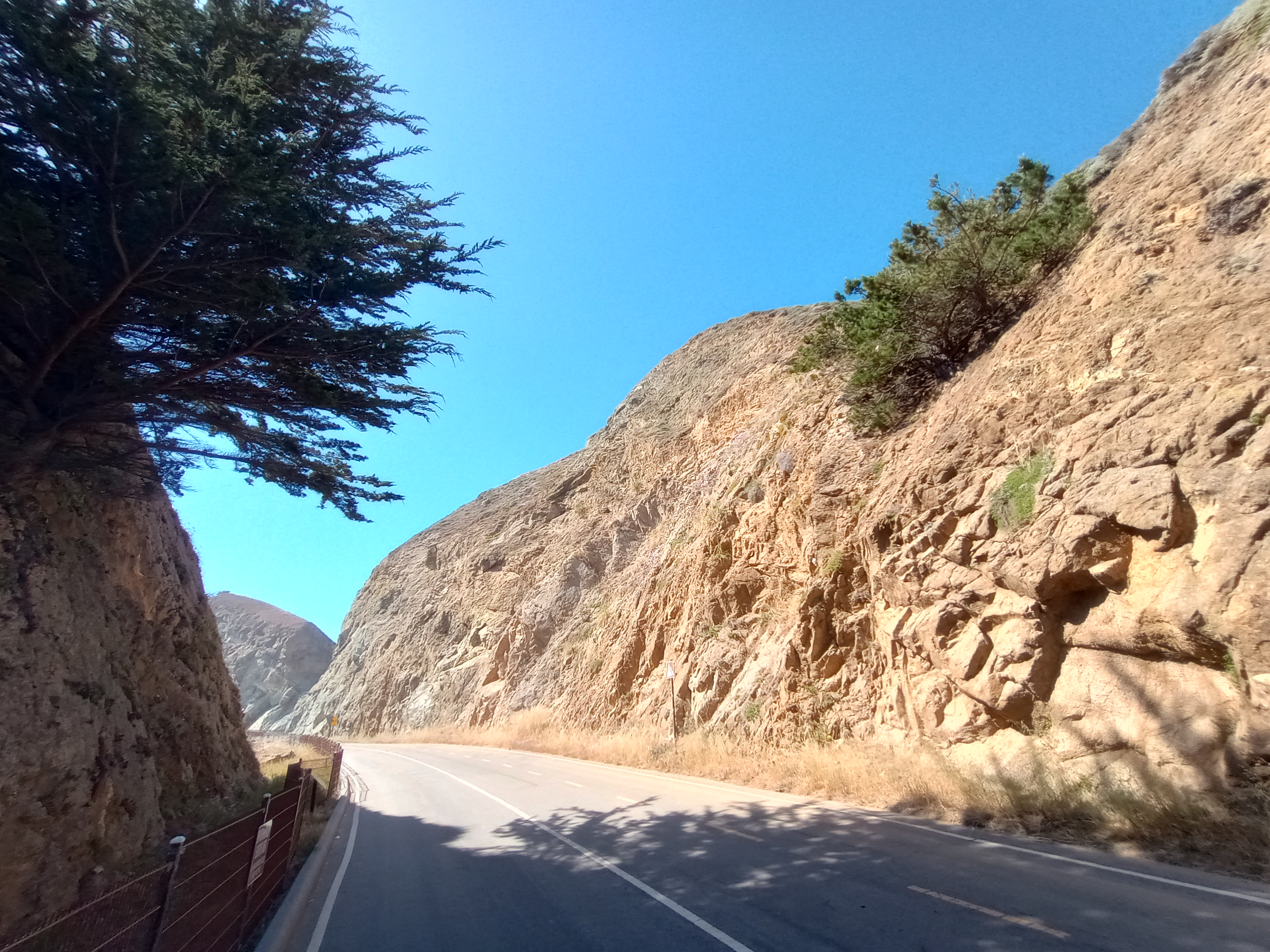
Section of Devil's Slide Trail (Old California State Road 1 section) South of Pacifica

== In popular culture ==
Devil's Slide was used in a key scene of the 1960 thriller Portrait in Black with Lana Turner and Anthony Quinn. Turner and Quinn portrayed doomed lovers who deliberately pushed a car, containing the body of a murdered man, over the edge of the cliff. The Universal crew obtained permission from the State of California to stage the scene, which involved retrieving the car from the bottom of the cliff once the scene had been successfully filmed. The San Mateo Times printed a photograph of the filming of this sequence.

== Military history ==
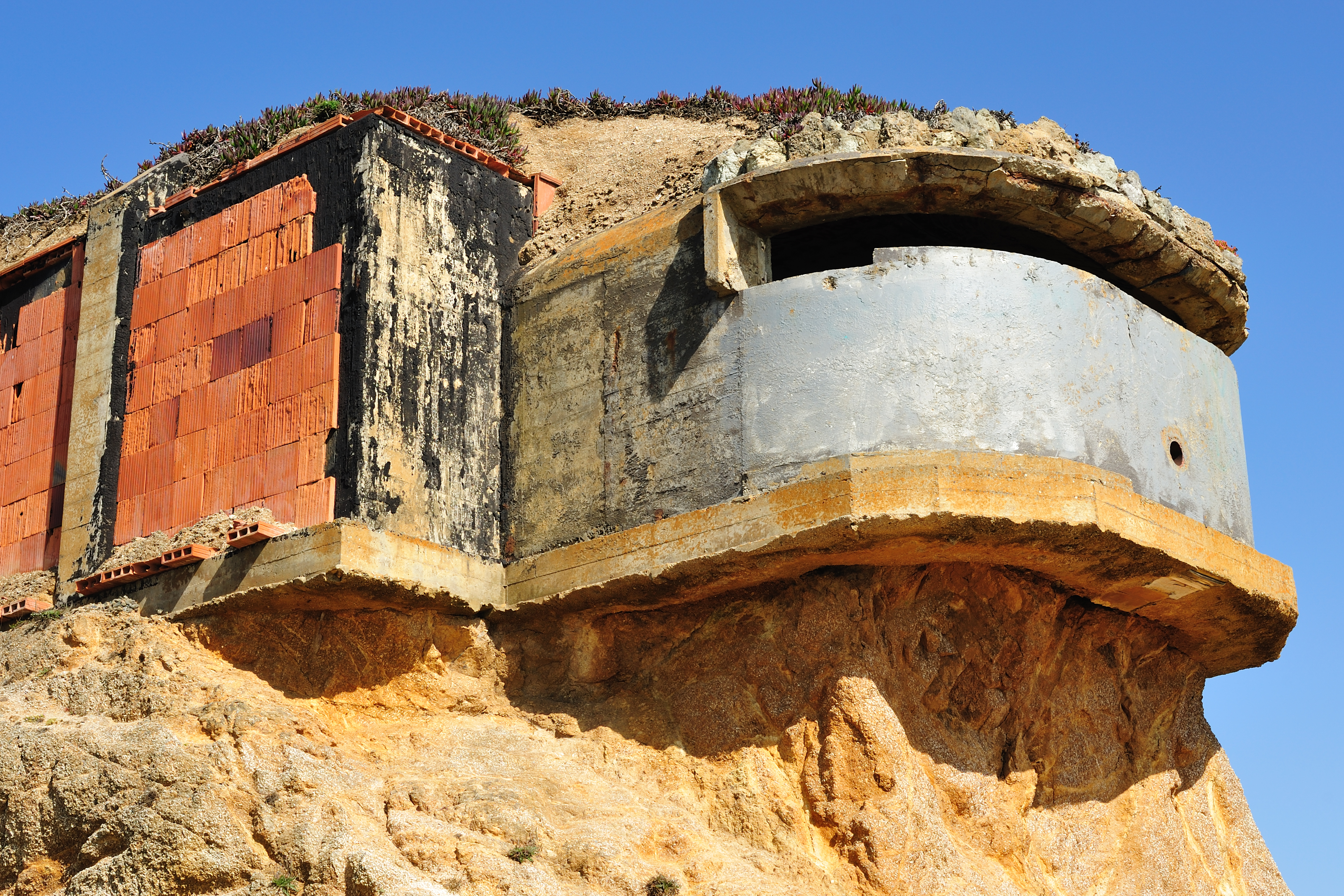
An exposed base end station at Devil's Slide

Devil's Slide was the location of a military triangulation station and observation site (known as Devil’s Bunker) used during World War II as part of the harbor defense of San Francisco. Prior to the advent of radar, military personnel used binoculars and compasses to search for ships at sea and relay their coordinates to a central post. By combining information from multiple observation posts, a ship's precise location could be determined by triangulation. There were six military structures at the Devil's Slide: three concrete and steel observation pill-boxes, two concrete-and-earth bunkers, and a reinforced steel observation tower. The pill-boxes were used as hardened observation posts, and one of the bunkers was used as a communications and command post. The southernmost bunker site was sold to a private owner in 1983, but some of the exposed structure remains.

== See also ==
- Salinian Block
- Coastal erosion
- California landslides

== Bibliography ==
- Biological Assessment, Species of Concern, Proposed Route 1 Devil's Slide Tunnel Bypass Project, San Mateo County, California Prepared by Caltrans, Office of Environmental Planning, South. July, 1998.
- Michael Hogan and Ballard George, Air Quality and Noise Analyses for the Bypass Alternative, Devil's Slide Improvement Project, Caltrans District 4, prepared by Earth Metrics Inc., Burlingame, CA (1984)
- Devil's Slide Improvement Project, San Mateo County, California, Draft Second Supplemental Environmental Impact Statement, Caltrans District 4 (1999)
- Hovland, John H., Ph.D., P.E., A Study of the Feasibility of Stabilizing the Landslide Area Along Highway One, San Mateo County, California, by Dewatering, April, 1998
- Woodward-Clyde Consultants, Devil’s Slide Tunnel Study - Feasibility Report, October, 1996.
