= San Vicente Creek (San Mateo County) =

Coordinates: 37.524385°N 122.518312°W

San Vincente Creek
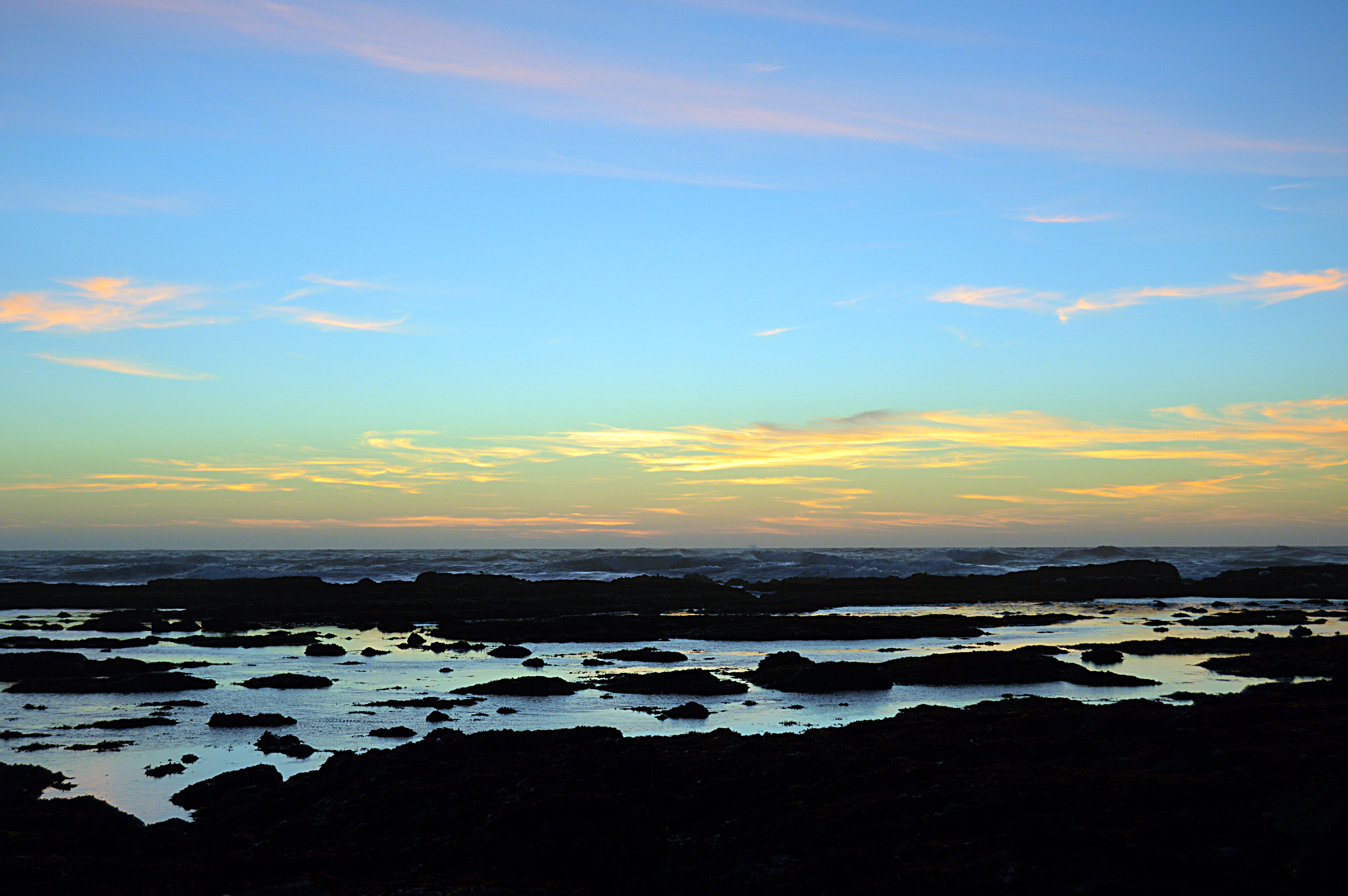

Physical characteristics
- Length: 3.9 mi (6.3 km)
- Discharge
  - location: Pacific Ocean

San Vicente Creek (Spanish for "St. Vincent") is a 3.9-mile-long (6.3 km) coastal stream in northern California which flows entirely within San Mateo County and discharges to the Pacific Ocean. Its waters rise on the west-facing slopes of the Montara Mountain, and its mouth is at the unincorporated community of Moss Beach, within the Fitzgerald Marine Reserve. Historically there was a tidal marsh at its mouth, but some of this reach has been degraded by fill, especially in the construction of West Point Drive. This westernmost reach of the creek has been especially ecologically productive, and part of the reason for Fitzgerald Marine Reserve's designation on August 5, 1969, as a state reserve and was named after James V. Fitzgerald.

== History ==
The streambanks of San Vicente Creek were inhabited by Native Americans as early as 3800 BC.

The first European land exploration of Alta California, the Spanish Portolá expedition, passed through the area on its way north, camping near the creek on October 30, 1769.

In the year 1933, discovery of the rare plant Hickman's potentilla was made in the lower stream reach, but the species is not known to have existed past the 1970s at this location.

== See also ==
- List of watercourses in the San Francisco Bay Area
