= Martini Creek =

River in California, United States

Coordinates: 37°33′10″N 122°30′47″W

Martini Creek is a coastal stream whose watershed lies entirely within San Mateo County, California, United States on the western exposures of the Montara mountain block, discharging to the Pacific Ocean. It flows about 2 miles (3 km) from its source on Montara Mountain to its mouth in Montara State Beach. This stream has a drainage basin composed of open space and agricultural lands. Some of the basin has moderate to steep slopes and much of the basin habitat is northern coastal scrub, and in places almost of a pygmy forest nature.

There are numerous species of flora and fauna which are found in this watershed, including the rare plant Hickman's potentilla. Yellow Bush Lupine is also seen here in a low growing form

The creek name became widely publicized when a highway alternative for the Devil's Slide bypass became dubbed the "Martini Creek Alignment". The highway proposal caused considerable study during the 1980s and 1990s of biology, geology, air quality and acoustics conditions within this watershed.

== Bibliography ==
- Biological Assessment, Species of Concern, Proposed Route 1 Devil's Slide Tunnel Bypass Project, San Mateo County, California Prepared by; Caltrans, Office of Environmental Planning, South. July, 1998.
- Devil's Slide Improvement Project, San Mateo County, California, Draft Second Supplemental Environmental Impact Statement, Caltrans District 4 (1999)
- Hogan, Michael and Ballard George, Air Quality and Noise Analyses for the Bypass Alternative, Devil's Slide Improvement Project, Caltrans District 4, prepared by Earth Metrics Inc., Burlingame, CA (1984)
- Hovland, John H., Ph.D., P.E., A Study of the Feasibility of Stabilizing the Landslide Area Along Highway One, San Mateo County, California, by Dewatering, April, 1998
- Woodward-Clyde Consultants, Devil’s Slide Tunnel Study: Feasibility Report, October, 1996.
