= Ocean Shore Railroad =

Railroad along the Pacific coast of the United States from 1905 to 1920

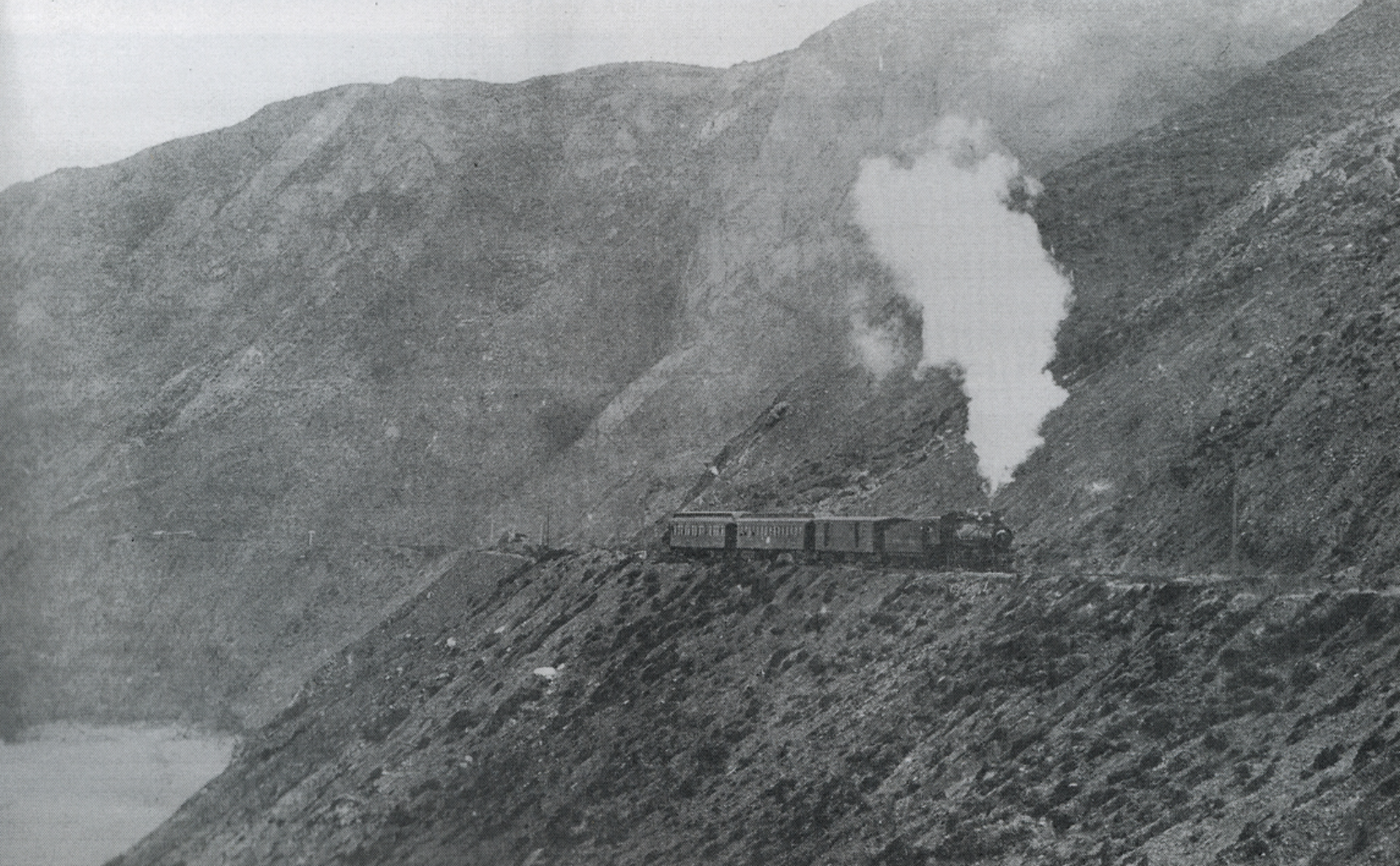
- Ocean Shore Railroad along present day Devil's Slide Trail between Pacifica and Half Moon Bay.

Overview
- Status: permanently closed
- Locale: Northern California
- Termini: San Francisco; Santa Cruz

Service
- Services: 2
- Operator(s): The San Francisco & Southern Railway Company

History
- Commenced: September 17, 1905
- Opened: May 1906
- Closed: July 31, 1920

Technical
- Line length: 54 mi (87 km)
- Character: passenger

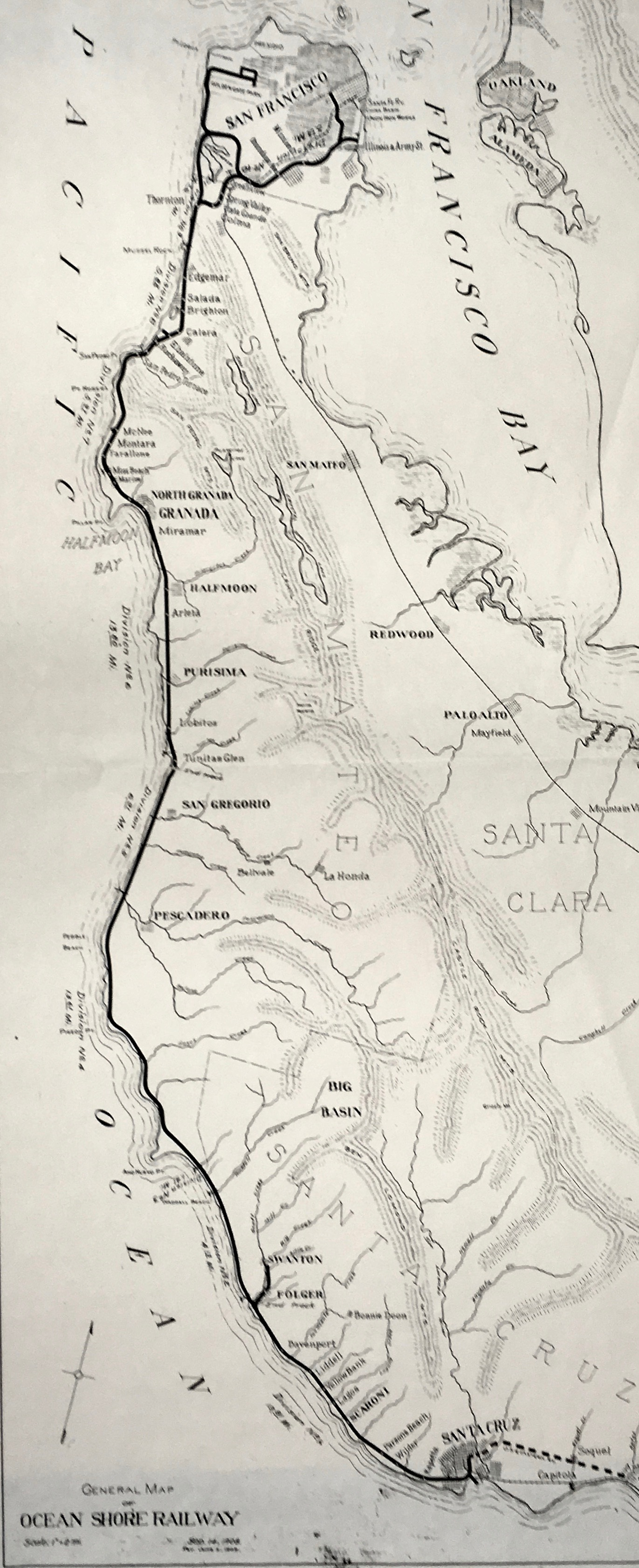
Route of the Ocean Shore Railroad as envisioned in 1908

The Ocean Shore Railroad was a railroad intended to run between San Francisco and Santa Cruz, California. The 1906 San Francisco Earthquake and financial difficulties prevented the railroad from completing construction. It operated as two discontinuous segments from 1905 to 1920: San Francisco to Tunitas Glen, and Swanton to Santa Cruz.

== Early railroad attempts ==
=== The San Francisco, Santa Cruz & Watsonville Railroad Company ===
The first attempts to construct a railroad between San Francisco and Santa Cruz began as early as 1870, with the organization of the San Francisco, Santa Cruz, & Watsonville Railroad Company. The railroad was to be funded via public money, however, most records cut off around 1872 so it is speculated that two other railroads had taken away the public interest.

=== San Francisco, San Mateo, & Santa Cruz Railroad ===
Incorporated in 1875, the railroad was funded by residents of San Mateo County in order to construct a line between San Francisco and Santa Cruz via Spanishtown (now Half Moon Bay). The railroad hired a surveying team, which published a final report in March 1876 detailing the feasibility. However, it is assumed the railroad went under due to lack of finances, as no other paper traces are found.

=== San Francisco & Ocean Shore Railroad Company ===
Incorporated in September 1879, the San Francisco & Ocean Shore Railroad Company was conceived to be a narrow-gauge railway running between San Francisco and Santa Cruz. In Santa Cruz, the line would have connected with the Santa Cruz Railroad and allowed for the exchange of freight. The San Francisco County Board of Supervisors granted the railroad permission to construct trackage from Fulton and Larkin Streets, and down away from the city, however construction was stalled after multiple business owners along the route launched lawsuits.

Said lawsuits took away time and money, as by 1881 the railroad had promised to construct a line to the border of San Mateo County, but in reality had not laid a single rail. Between 1880 and 1881 the railroad attempted to increase revenue by taking out mortgages and distributing stocks. In 1881, the Santa Cruz Railroad had gone bankrupt, which largely cut off a lot of funding for the San Francisco & Ocean Shore Railroad as some investors had put much of their fortune into the Santa Cruz Railroad too. Plans were redrawn to enter Santa Cruz.

In around January 1881, the railroad was reorganized to become a standard gauge line, and filed for incorporation to construct tracks through Half Moon Bay. Around May 1881, various rumors were circulating around San Francisco in relation to the San Francisco & Ocean Shore Railroad. These rumors included that the line was going to extend to Santa Barbara, and that it was secretly going to be a part of a new Atchison, Topeka and Santa Fe Railway transcontinental route along the coast.

After the Southern Pacific Railroad and the Atchison, Topeka and Santa Fe Railway had ended some bitter rivalries in December 1881, on Christmas Eve it was stated that the San Francisco & Ocean Shore Railroad's multi-state plan (involving the California Central Railway) was merely a ploy to scare the Southern Pacific Railroad into reducing the cost of freight switching at junctions with the Atchison, Topeka, & Santa Fe. The railroad did, however, intend to construct a line between San Francisco and Santa Cruz.

The announcement had dire consequences, and in early 1882 the San Francisco County Board of Supervisors voted to delay the acceptance of the franchise to allow the running of the railroad in the city itself. By November 1882, the San Francisco & Ocean Shore Railroad had indefinitely ceased development of the line, and after numerous economic crashes, the line was abandoned without a single track laid.

The railroad was in fact reorganized though into the San Francisco & Santa Cruz Railway, however, the railroad went bankrupt and had to shut down.

=== San Francisco & West Shore Railway Company ===
Incorporated in March 1892, the line intended to construct an electric interurban railway between San Francisco and Santa Cruz via a tunnel at San Pedro Point (now Pedro Point, just south of Pacifica). The railroad was conceived to carry basically only freight of the coast-side villages. However, for unknown reasons, in November 1892 the Mayor of San Francisco rejected the proposal for the railroad to run its line on 25th Street and Potrero Avenue, which led the railway to frantically reorganize its plans.

The railroad tried to fight the opposition of the plans in San Francisco in the Supreme Court, but failed. In 1894 a government study on the feasibility of the railroad was released, but nothing more was heard, suggesting that the line lost revenue and funding.

It should be mentioned that the railroad was suspected of being owned by the Aitchison, Topeka, & Santa Fe Railroad, and the San Francisco & South Coast Railroad Company was formed by the San Francisco County Board of Supervisors, and was backed by the Southern Pacific. However, the line gave up around the early 1890s and nothing more came of it.

=== West Shore Railway Company ===
Incorporated in April 1895 as the West Shore & Valley Railway, the line intended to construct a line between San Francisco and Tulare via Santa Cruz. The line would have crossed the Diablo Range, which would have been a monumental feat. In July 1895 however, the line was reorganized to form the West Shore Railway Company, whose goals were to build a standard gauge railway line between San Francisco and Santa Cruz. The new West Shore Railway was meant to haul freight and passenger service, at a time estimate of two hours and ten minutes between the two cities.

The acquisition of former right of ways and properties of the San Francisco & West Shore Railway was quick, and apparently had already begun construction of a right of way in April 1895. A passenger station would have been built at 25th & Potrero in San Francisco and was financed primarily through business-men in New York.

Due to the reluctance of property owners willing to hand over properties to the railway, construction was largely stalled as the construction costs kept rising. Between 1895 and 1898 there was no work actually done, which was unsettling to the financers. In March 1899, the railroad had stated that they wished to be sold to the Vanderbilt Company, in direct competition to the Southern Pacific. However, the Directors had rejected this last-minute, and the railroad had lost a lot of finances. In December 1899 the railroad's franchise in San Francisco expired, and subsequently, the line had given up all hopes of ever achieving a route and abandoned plans.

=== Bay & Coast Railway Company ===
Incorporated in June 1889 to construct a standard gauge line between San Francisco and Santa Cruz, the line was a private company and had unknown financers. Due to how the railway would have entered San Francisco on a major street, the San Francisco County Board of Supervisors required that the railway build track by September 1901, as all the other past railroads had failed to do this. The railroad failed to do this, and subsequently, the franchise expired and by February 1902, the line was shut down.

=== The San Francisco & Southern Railway Company ===
In September 1903, the San Francisco & Southern Railway was formed to construct a line between San Francisco and Santa Cruz, via the same route as its predecessors. Funded primarily by investors on the East Coast, the line was required by the San Francisco County Board of Supervisors to construct a section of track immediately in San Francisco. However, most paper-records dropped off around this time, so nothing more is heard about the railway.

== Initial railroad plans ==
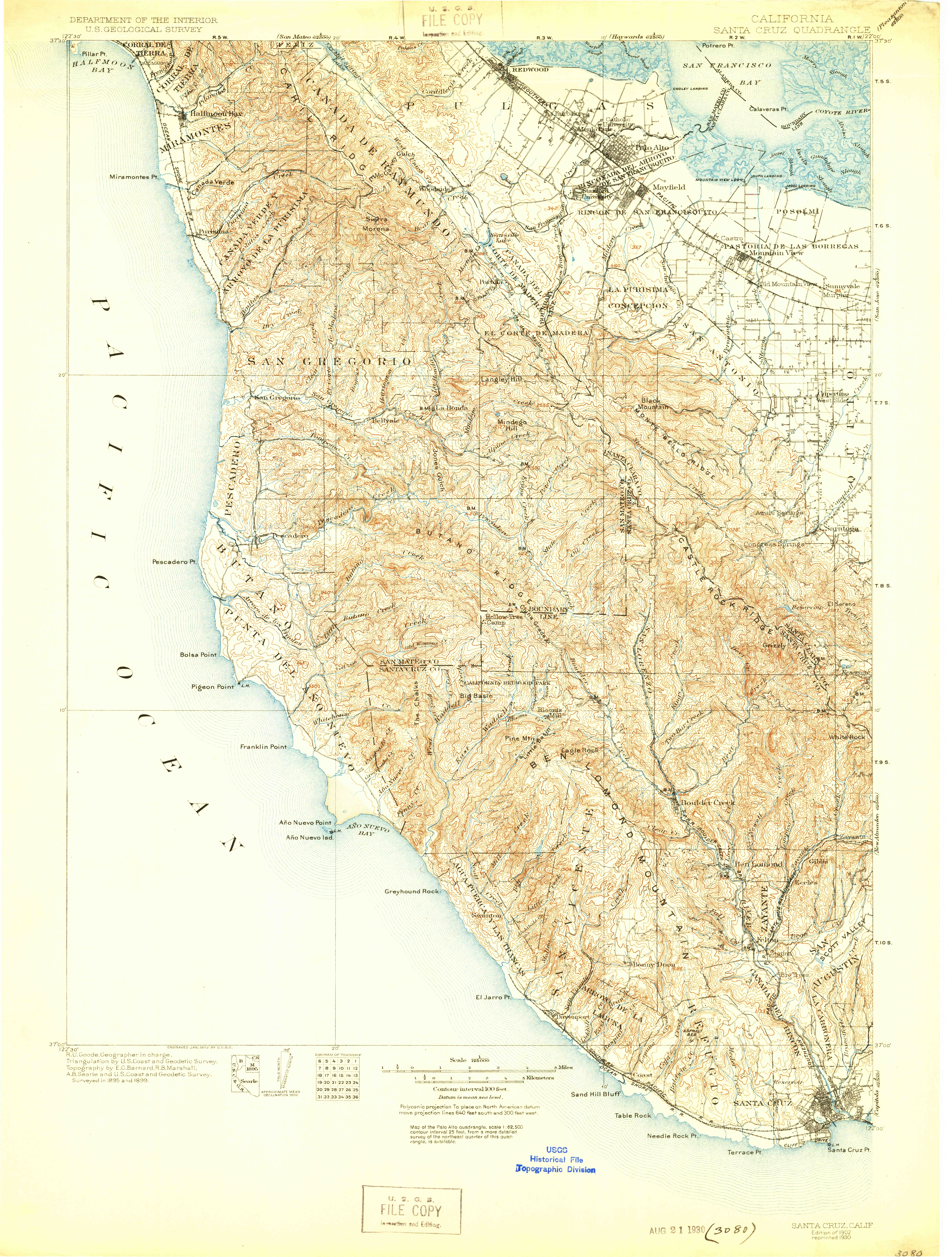
In this USGS map, the Ocean Shore Railroad runs from the north to Tunitas Creek, and from Santa Cruz to the Davenport Area. After a gap, the Northern division starts at Tunitas Creek and goes north off the map after Tierra.

Originally incorporated as the Ocean Shore Railway Company on May 18, 1905, the plan was to run a 1500 volt Alternating-Current double-tracked line between San Francisco and Santa Cruz, operating with interurbans and electric freight motors. Other plans that were originally considered, would have operated the railway under 3300 volts alternating current, utilizing both third rail and overhead catenary wiring. The railway was backed primarily by a group of very successful and wealthy business-men of San Francisco, including future railroad president: J. Downey Harvey. Notable people include: J.A. Folger, and Horace D. Pillsbury.

The railroad would have followed the route of its predecessors along the San Mateo Coast, and would have had a large yard in the center of Santa Cruz.

Further plans called for subsidiaries such as the Ocean Shore & Eastern, which would have run a line between Santa Cruz to Watsonville where it would have connected with other Ocean Shore Railroad related schemes, such as the Fresno, Coalinga, & Monterey Railroad, which aimed to connect Fresno and Monterey via somewhere around the Pacheco Pass.

Real estate plans all along the coast were also envisioned, such as a massive boardwalk and amusement park at Granada, with cheap affordable housing being found at Montara. El Granada was one of the only towns developed by the Ocean Shore Railroad, with its circular street pattern design.

Ultimately, the ideal of a 1500 volt alternating current double-track line would not come to fruition, and neither would the railroad ever connect San Francisco and Santa Cruz. The plans for the Ocean Shore & Eastern and the other Ocean Shore Railroad subsidiary plans never came to be either due to lack of interest or the financial crash that occurred subsequently after the devastating 1906 Earthquake.

== History ==
Construction began on September 17, 1905, with the grades being dug out at points in Santa Cruz and Spring Valley (12 miles [19 km] southwest of San Francisco). Problems began almost immediately when Southern Pacific hastily built a new spur track in Santa Cruz blocking the intended route through town to the wharf. For power and right of way on the south end, the company would go on to purchase the electrified streetcar system of Santa Cruz, the Union Traction Company. The sale was announced on February 5, 1906.

The April 18, 1906 earthquake caused major damage, with parts of the roadbed and construction equipment sliding into the Pacific and investors incurring extended losses. This would fatally delay completion of the railroad. The Santa Cruz streetcars reverted to their original stockholders after the Ocean Shore stopped making payments after the disaster. A tunnel was built at Pedro Point just north of Devil's Slide. There were numerous bridges and trestles along the route. The tracks from San Francisco were completed as far south as Tunitas Creek, south of Half Moon Bay. The tracks north from Santa Cruz were completed as far north as Swanton, north of Davenport. Full electrification at the outset of operations was seen as infeasible, but tracks within the city of San Francisco were electrified (with a regular 600 V DC trolley system) as a stipulation of franchises for operating on city streets. The rest of the line was operated with steam locomotives, and later, with self-propelled rail cars. A never-built branch would have split from the mainline and run along what is now 19th Avenue, Eucalyptus Drive, 47th Avenue, Rivera Street, and 48th Avenue to Golden Gate Park.

The southern section opened in May 1906 to Swanton with regular service starting in June. The parallel Coastline Railway was completed in 1907 and purchased by the Southern Pacific, depriving the Ocean Shore of freight traffic. The northern section opened on October 2, 1907 to Tobin. With a financial panic brewing, it was hoped that starting service would generate revenue to help complete the line.

Extensions to the southern section followed in 1908: Granada in June, Ocean Shore in October, and finally Tunitas Glen. Shuttle service on this section was provided by a Stanley Steamer. Despite significant passenger patronage, especially on weekends, the railroad never recovered from losses in the 1906 earthquake and failed to attract enough freight traffic to cover increasing deficits. The company filed for bankruptcy in 1909, though operations continued mostly uninterrupted. When the company was sold to bondholders in 1911, the bankruptcy receiver revealed that they had the funds on hand to bridge the north and south segments and complete the line, though the bondholders considered this move too risky. With new ownership, the company was renamed to the Ocean Shore Railroad Company. Finances had improved by 1912, with the line showing a profit that year. The San Francisco Municipal Railway began running their H Potrero streetcar along the Ocean Shore line on Potrero, double tracking the shared section.

Completion of the Pedro Mountain Road in 1913 provided additional competition to the railroad, particularly since many farmers began using trucks to transport their produce to San Francisco, instead of paying expensive freight charges. Tracks near Pedro Valley were washed out in January 1916, halting service as tracks were relocated around Devil's Slide.

Mainline service was abandoned in 1920 following a labor walkout. The line north from Santa Cruz was leased to the San Vicente Lumber Company, which continued to use the tracks until 1923. Electrified tracks within the city of San Francisco, which served major industries, were operated for many years, in part by the San Francisco Muni. A segment of the railroad in the southeast section of San Francisco was also operated by the Western Pacific Railroad. This section was in use until the mid-1980s and was the last part of the Ocean Shore in operation.

Following abandonment, the railroad company fought for decades over ownership of their right-of-way, large portions of which they had purchased wholesale rather than as easements. The company reincorporated as the Ocean Shore Railroad Company, Inc., on November 16, 1934, and continued to exist as this legal entity for many years in order to manage the sales and leasing of various properties the company still owned in San Mateo and Santa Cruz Counties. This corporation was legally terminated on December 31, 1994.

== Remnants ==
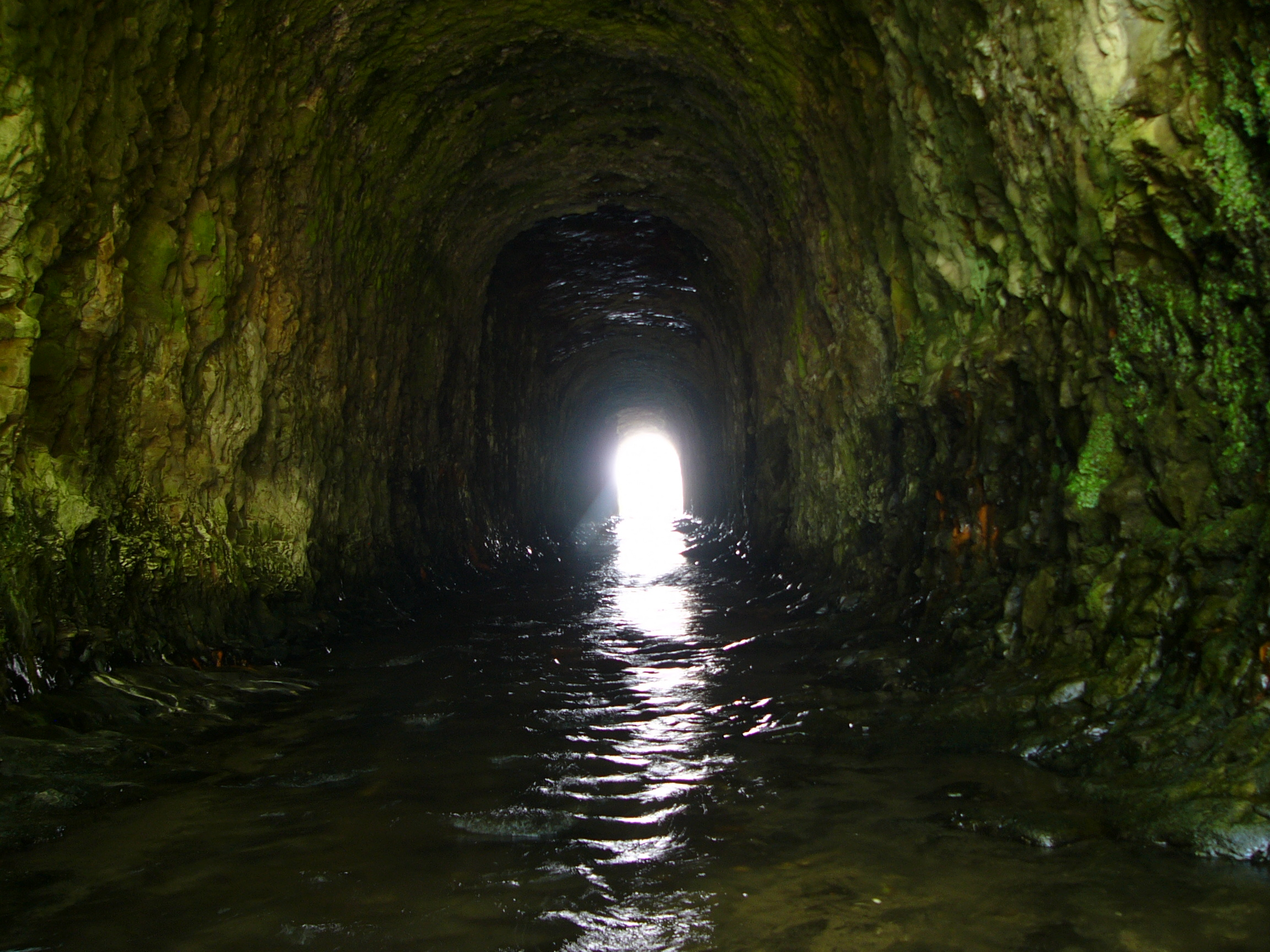
San Vicente Creek culvert at Davenport

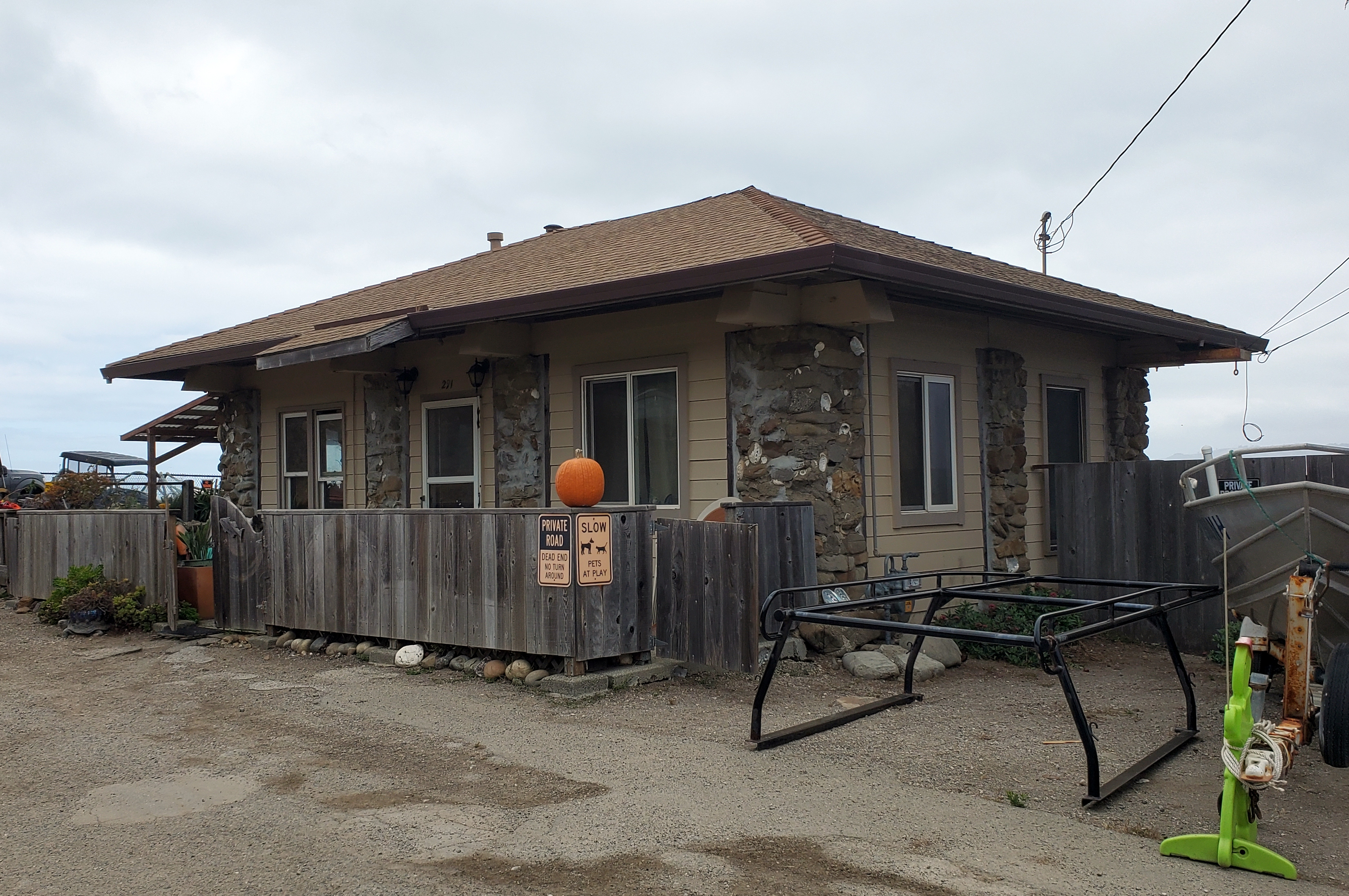
The former Tobin station in 2023

Gorilla Barbeque in Pacifica uses a boxcar that was once part of the Ocean Shore Railroad. Parts of the right of way were reused for Highway 1.

=== Stations ===
The station at Montara still exists as a residence at 222 Second Street. Bricks laid out in the word "Montara" can be seen in the pavement in front of the front door.

The Salada Beach Station (sometimes shortened to Salada) was located near where Paloma Avenue (formerly San Mateo Avenue) crosses Highway 1 in present-day Sharp Park. The station originally sat at the northeast corner of Francisco Way and San Mateo Avenue, until Highway 1 was rerouted along the former railroad right of way through Sharp Park. The station remained vacant until it was demolished in the early 1940s. A Flying A gas station was then built on the site, and it remained until the freeway was built in 1965.

Brighton Beach Station was located at the northwest corner of Francisco Boulevard and Lakeside Avenue. The station stood as a residence until the early 1980s. An apartment complex was built on its location in the early 2000s.

The Farallone City Station was built in 1903 where Seventh Street crosses the Railroad right-of-way (now Highway 1) in Montara. The structure was originally one story but now stands as a two-story residence. The post office stood across the street, but has since been demolished.

The North Granada Station was built in 1900, and stands at 10151 Cabrillo Highway in El Granada, currently housing Breakwater Barbecue. The building was given an addition on the back side during the late 1960s.

The Arleta Park Station was built in 1904 and stands at 920 Railroad Avenue in Half Moon Bay. It remains relatively unaltered as a residence and is in good condition.

The Kelly Street Station is now situated near the Johnston House on the south side of Higgins Canyon Road in Half Moon Bay.

Vallemar Station remains situated at 2125 Coast Highway. It was opened as a railway-themed restaurant between 1996 and 2026 and had decor inspired by the Ocean Shore Railroad in its interior, with an original rail from the railroad acting as a footrest at the bar.

Rockaway Beach Station was located at the southeast corner of Rockaway Beach Avenue (formerly Hewitt Avenue) and Highway 1. The structure was demolished and its lumber was recycled to build part of the home at 635 Rockaway Beach Avenue. The site of the station was later used as the site for a small grocery store, which continued in operation until the structure was demolished to make room for Fassler Avenue in the early 1970s.

Tobin Station is located on San Pedro Point, at the corner of Danmann Avenue and Shelter Cove Road. The former outdoor shelter was enclosed many years ago and is now a private residence. The station went through many name changes including San Pedro Terrace, San Pedro Terrace By-The-Sea and finally Pedro Valley. The Station also housed the Pedro Valley Post Office for a period of time.

After the abandonment of the railroad, the Moss Beach Station stood vacant until the 1930s, when it was then used as a broom factory until its demolition in the late 1940s.

The Edgemar Station was once located at the intersection of Clifton and Waterford Streets in Pacifica, but has been demolished. The old Santa Cruz Depot, which was located at 213 Bay Street, suffered the same fate.

The Granada Station was moved a block from its original location to the corner of Ave Portola and The Alameda.

The Thornton Station was once located at the southwest corner of Skyline Boulevard & John Daly Boulevard on the outskirts of Daly City. The station and auxiliary buildings were demolished in the early 1950s.
