= Montara Mountain =

Mountain in California, United States

Highest point
- Elevation: 1,901 ft (579 m) NAVD 88
- Prominence: 486 ft (148 m)
- Coordinates: 37°31′43″N 122°25′37″W

Geography
- Location within San Francisco Bay Area Location within California
- Location: San Mateo County, California, U.S.
- Parent range: Santa Cruz Mountains
- Topo map: USGS Montara Mountain

Climbing
- Easiest route: Hike

Montara Mountain, positioned between the unincorporated community of Montara, California, to the southwest and the city of Pacifica, California, to the north, forms the northern spur of the Santa Cruz Mountains, a narrow mountain range running the length of the San Francisco Peninsula that separates San Francisco Bay from the Pacific Ocean. Its highest point rises to 1,898 feet (579 m) above sea level. Montara and Pacifica are connected by the Tom Lantos Tunnels, which run through the Mountain.

== History ==
The earliest historical trail remnant of Montara Mountain is the precolonial Indian Trail which traverses the ridgeline between Willow Brook Estates towards Saddle Pass following the high ridgeline above Green Valley and winding down towards Martini Creek. Remnants of this trail remain visible today.

=== Colonial history ===
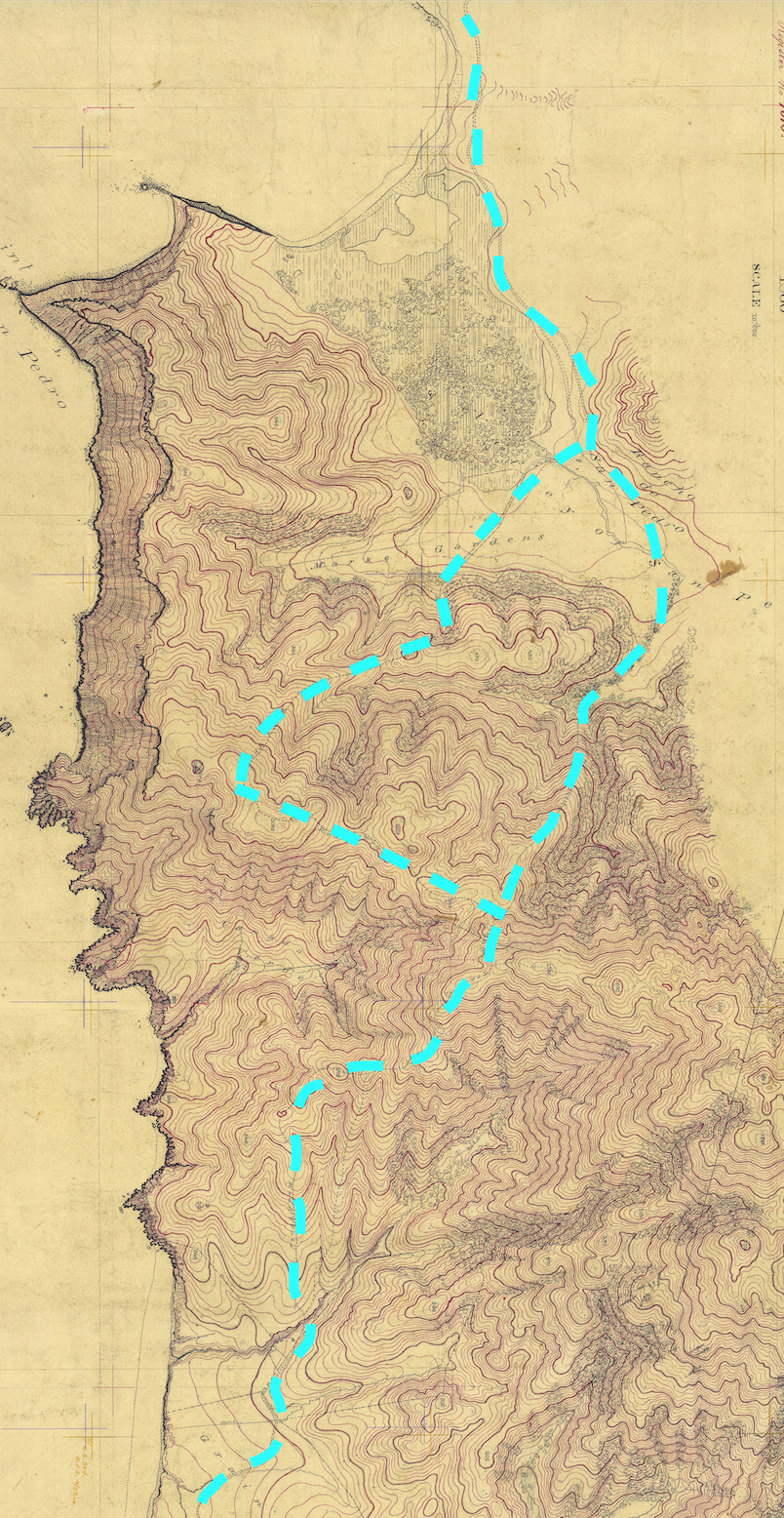
Trails south of San Pedro in 1866

The earliest descriptions of the area are from the Portolá Expedition in 1769, "We halted near the shore, along which the passage was entirely closed by a steep hill, at the foot of which ran a stream of good water. This stream flowed from a hollow formed by various hills; at the extreme end of this hollow, close to the hills, we pitched our camp, which was thus protected to the north. To-day’s march was one league. The place afterwards known by the name of Rincón de las Almejas." On October 31, the expedition began its climb of Montara Mountain. Portolá wrote: "We travelled two hours of very bad road up over a very high mountain." When they got to the top, the commander noted that "25 heathens came up." These were the Aramai of Pruristac. "A village of very fine, well-behaved friendly heathens, …(who brought) a good many black pies made of seeds...There must be many villages...for we have seen many smokes from here; mussels are also very plentiful here, and very large... Many deer have been seen upon the hills here... Bear tracks and droppings have been seen...our sick men since we left the creek of La Salud (Waddell Creek in Santa Cruz County) have been improving more every day..." They had descended the treeless hill and pitched camp in the middle of a small valley (San Pedro).

=== Mexican period ===
During the Mexican Rancho era, a road known as Camino Pedro Cuesta also traversed Saddle Pass and connected the Sanchez Adobe in Rancho San Pedro in San Pedro Valley with Rancho Corral de Tierra Palomares in Montara. Following the Mexican–American War of 1848, this routing was known as "Road Trail" and was considered to be nearly impassable to wheeled vehicles. In 1879 this steep and rutted Road Trail crossing of Montara Mountain was replaced by the marginally improved road known as the Half Moon Bay - Colma Road, which included road grades of 24%. This road which routed closer to the ocean and Devil's Slide terminated in Shamrock Ranch and persisted until 1915.

== Biodiversity ==
Due in part to its biologically isolated location near the end of a peninsula, the mountain has an extensive and unique biodiversity, especially on the serpentine soils of the lower slopes. A number of plant endangered species are found on this mountain, including Hickman's potentilla and San Mateo thornmint, Acanthomintha duttonii. The rare endemic manzanita Arctostaphylos montaraensis was named for this mountain.

== Water bodies ==
On occasions light snow has dusted the summit. On clear days the summit has views of much of the San Francisco Bay Area. Denniston Creek, Arroyo de en Medio, Dean Creek, and San Pedro Creek rise on Montara Mountain. The steelhead population in San Pedro Creek is within the Central California Coast Steelhead distinct population segment and is listed at threatened (2011). Brooks Creek, a tributary of San Pedro Creek originates on the north face of the mountain and forms a tall thin waterfall, Brooks Falls, which is the tallest in San Mateo County at 207 feet.

== Trails ==
An unpaved fire road, the North Peak Access Road, accessible from the Pedro Mountain Road in McNee Ranch State Park, provides access to the summit by hikers from the south. From the north, Montara Mountain Trail and Brooks Creek Trail provide access to the mountain with trailheads in San Pedro Valley County Park.

The Devil's Slide Trail connects Pacifica to Montara along Devil's Slide.
