= Pillar Point =

Pillar Point may refer to:

- Pillar Point (band)
- Pillar Point Air Force Station
- Pillar Point Bluff
- Pillar Point State Marine Conservation Area
- Pillar Point Harbor, California
- Pillar Point (Hong Kong), a coastal area of Tuen Mun Town
- Pillar Point, New York
- Pillar Point County Park, Washington state
