= San Mateo County Harbor District =

Special District overview
- Formed: 1933
- Jurisdiction: San Mateo County

The San Mateo County Harbor District is an autonomous district created to operate harbor facilities within the boundaries of San Mateo County.

== Founding ==
The San Mateo County Harbor District was founded as an autonomous district with jurisdiction to operate within the borders of San Mateo County by a 1933 resolution of the San Mateo County Board of Supervisors. That action was pursuant to the June 10, 1931 creation by the California State Legislature of an “Act Providing for the Formation, Government and Operation of Harbor Districts, the Calling and Conducting of Elections in such District of Harbor Commissioners, defining their powers and duties, and providing for the issuance and disposal of bonds of such Harbor District, and providing for the assessment, levy, and collection of taxes for the payment of such bond and for the ordinary annual expenses of such Harbor District." The district remained inactive until 1948.

== Facilities ==
The Harbor District operates two facilities: Pillar Point Harbor in Princeton on the Pacific Ocean coast just north of Half Moon Bay and the Oyster Point Marina/Park on the San Francisco Bay in the City of South San Francisco. The City of South San Francisco owns Oyster Point Marina/Park and the Harbor District operates it on behalf of the City under a Joint powers authority agreement. Pillar Point is a working fishing harbor with 369 berths. and Oyster Point is a 600 berth recreational boating marina.

== Governance ==
The Harbor District is governed by a five-member Board of Harbor Commissioners, who are elected in Districted elections for staggered four-year terms.

=== Board Members ===
- Kathryn Slater-Carter, President (4 year term, 2023-2027)
- George Domurat, Vice President (4 year term, 2023-2027)
- William Zemke, Secretary, (4 year term, 2025-2029)
- Tom Mattusch, Treasurer, (4 year term, 2025-2029)
- Virginia Chang Kiraly, Commissioner, (4 year term, 2025-2029)

=== Past Board Members ===
- James J. Tucker, first appointed March 18, 1998, and most recently re-elected November 2010. Tucker lost the Nov. 2014 election by 292 votes. Nicole David unseated Tucker in the Nov. 2014 election.
- William Holsinger, first appointed to fill Sally Campbell's vacancy in 2012 and appointed a second time to fill Leo Padreddii's vacancy in 2013. The board of Harbor Commissioners appointed Holsinger twice, following the death of Commissioner Sally Campbell, and following the death of Commissioner Leo Padreddii. Holsinger lost two Harbor District elections, the first was Nov. 2, 2004, and the second was Nov. 6, 2012. Sabrina Brennan unseated Holsinger in the Nov. 2012 election and Tom Mattusch unseated Holsinger in the Nov. 2014 election.
- Leo Padreddii (first elected 1995, most recently re-elected November 2012, health leave December 2012, died April 17, 2013) San Mateo attorney Will Holsinger was appointed to fill the remainder of Padreddii's term.
- Sally Campbell (first elected 1992, served 19 years, died aged 68 on April 7, 2012). San Mateo attorney Will Holsinger was appointed to fill the remainder of her term (he lost his November 2012 bid to keep the position).

== Meetings ==
Meetings take place the third Wednesday of every month at 10:00 AM at 504 Avenue Alhambra, El Granada, California. They can also be viewed on Zoom and are published to the District's YouTube channel, Pacific Coast TV YouTube channel, and are also broadcast live on local cable television.
