= Fitzgerald Marine Reserve =

Marine reserve in California on the Pacific Ocean

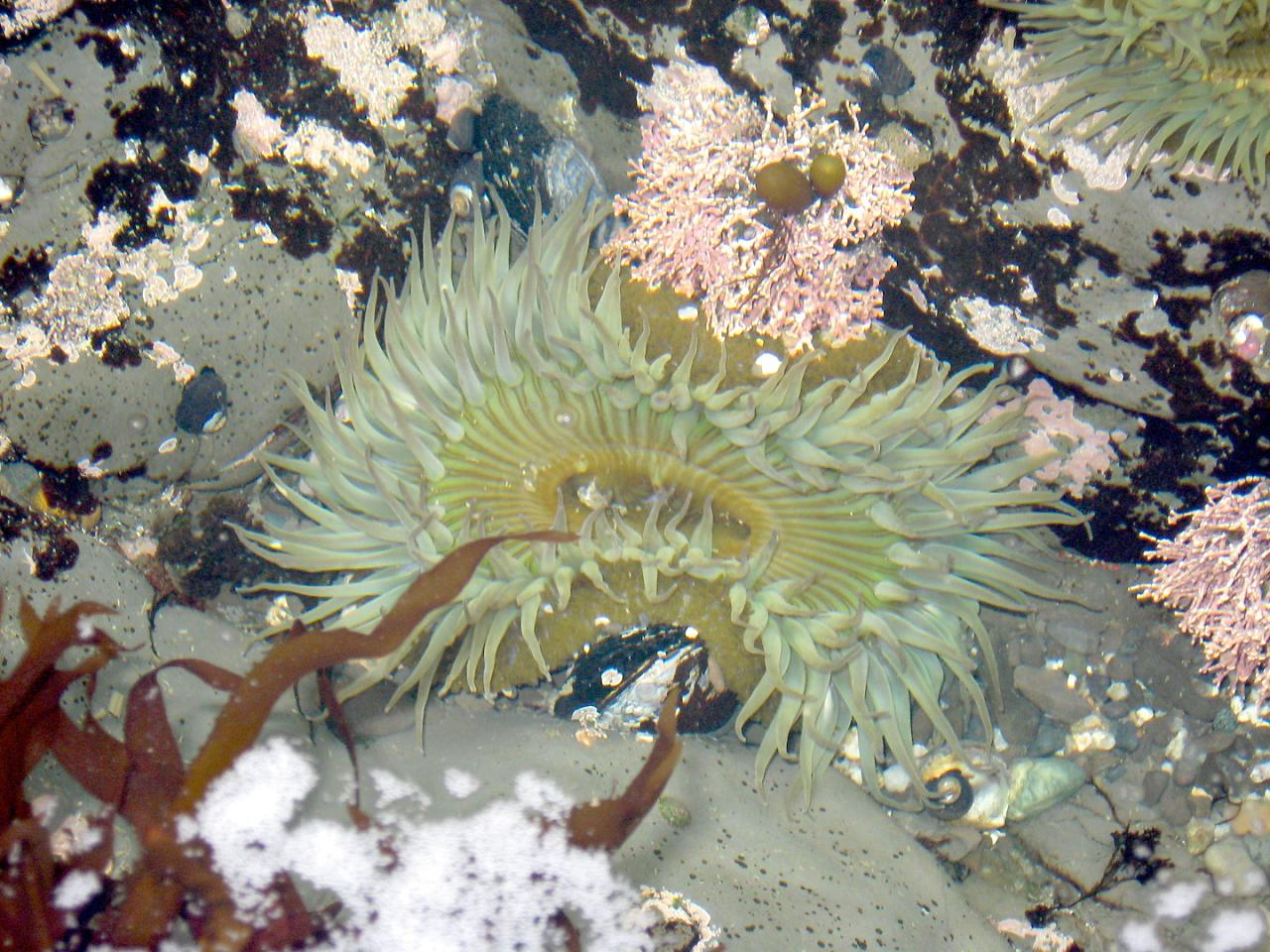
- Tidepool and sea anemones, Fitzgerald Marine Reserve

- Location within California Location within the United States
- Coordinates: 37°30′38″N 122°30′35″W
- Established: 1969
- Governing body: California Department of Fish and Game
- Website: parks.smcgov.org/fitzgerald-marine-reserve

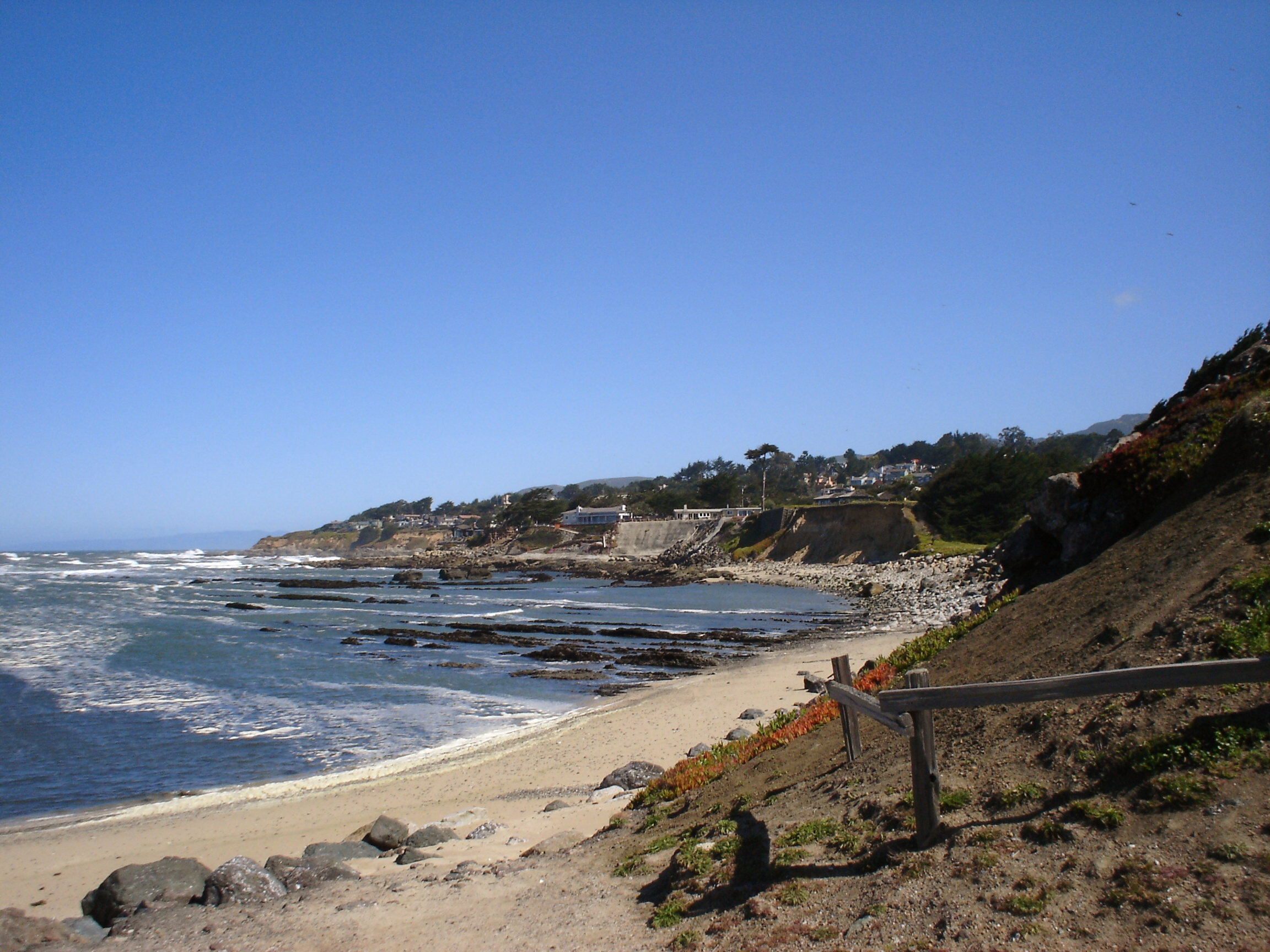
Moss Beach shoreline from the Fitzgerald Marine Reserve, April 2007. Part of the Franciscan formation is visible near the beach

Fitzgerald Marine Reserve is a marine reserve in California on the Pacific Ocean, located just north of Pillar Point Harbor and Mavericks in the San Mateo County community of Moss Beach. Moss Beach is located approximately 20 miles (32 km) south of San Francisco and 50 miles (80 km) north of Santa Cruz. The reserve is a 32-acre (0.13 km^{2}) holding which extends from Montara light station at the north to Pillar Point on the south. The reserve consists of a three-mile stretch of beach, tidepool habitat, marsh, erosive bluffs, clifftop trail and cypress and eucalyptus forests. The property is owned by the State of California and managed by San Mateo County as a county park and nature preserve. The reserve is administratively assigned to be part of the Monterey Bay National Marine Sanctuary. Adjacent to and possibly within the reserve is an endangered species of butterfly, the San Bruno elfin butterfly.

Montara State Marine Reserve & Pillar Point State Marine Conservation Area extend offshore from Montara, just north of Pillar Point. Like underwater parks, these marine protected areas help conserve ocean wildlife and marine ecosystems. Fitzgerald Marine Reserve lies within Montara State Marine Reserve.

== History ==
The site of the current Fitzgerald Marine Reserve was originally settled by Native Americans approximately 5,800 years ago. In 1908, the Ocean Shore Railroad extended through the town of Moss Beach, effectively creating this location as a tourist destination. Remains of the foundation and some original landscape features from the Smith-Doelger homesite from the early-1900s may be found on the bluffs overlooking the Reserve.

The site has long been a source of research and materials for marine biologists and collectors, so much so that, in 1969, San Mateo County urged the State of California to designate the site as a state reserve to protect the remaining flora and fauna. On August 5, 1969, the site was officially designated as a state reserve and was named after James V. Fitzgerald, former mayor of San Bruno and a longtime member of the San Mateo County Board of Supervisors.

== Natural features ==
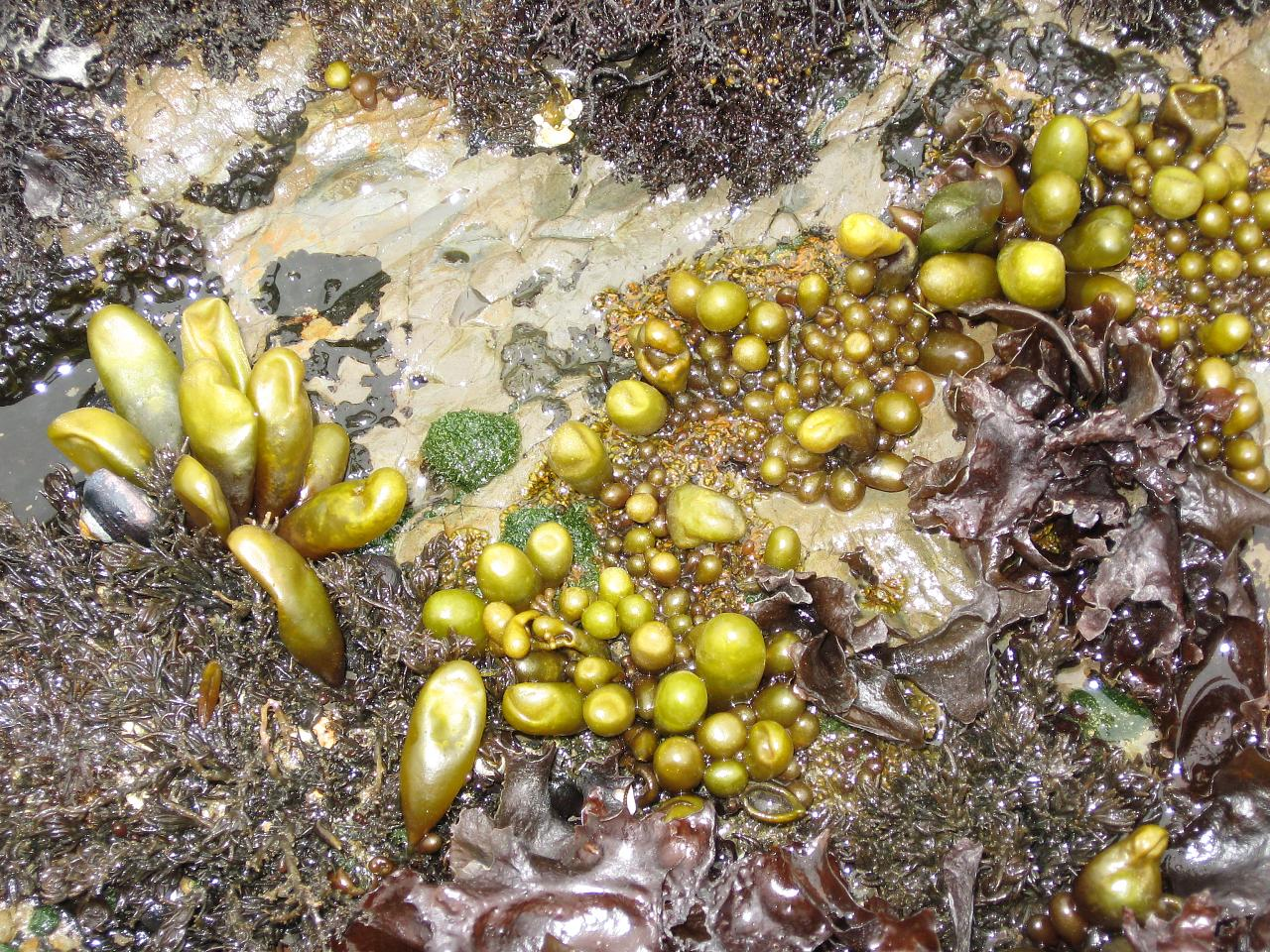
"Sea grapes", Halosaccion glandiforme

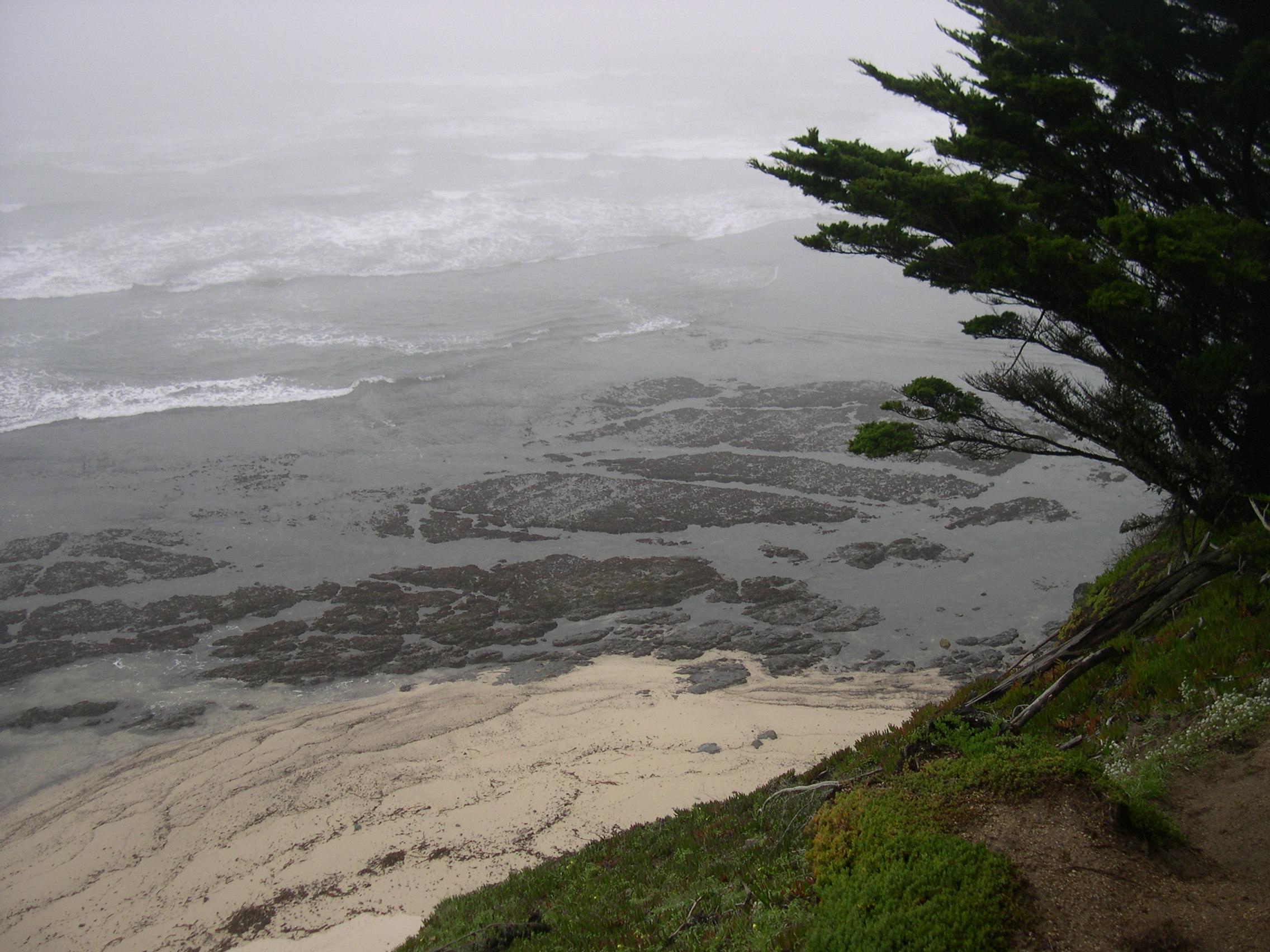
View from Bluff Trail Looking down to Frenchmans Reef intertidal Zone

The tidepool habitat has long been prized as one of the best such habitats in northern California. It has been identified by the State of California as one of 34 such coastal habitats having "Special Biological Significance". Sea urchins, sea anemones, hermit crabs and many other intertidal species are prominent.

At the north of the reserve San Vicente Creek empties into the Pacific Ocean and has a diverse habitat supporting Red Willow and other riparian species. From a footbridge across San Vicente Creek, one climbs atop the bluff trail, which rises about 30 meters (98 ft) above the beach. From there one has rewarding views down upon Frenchmans Reef, a rich marine ecological area. Seaward the reserve extends to a depth of over 300 meters (980 ft) downward into the Pacific Ocean. The reef is composed of the rock granodiorite.

An occurrence of the rare plant Hickman's potentilla, Potentilla hickmanii, was observed by E.C. Suttliffe in 1933 in the vicinity of the mouth of San Vicente Creek within Moss Beach. This colony was not further documented for decades, but another colony was discovered toward the end of the 20th century north of Moss Beach. The plant was listed as an endangered species by the United States government in 1998, and had previously been listed as California endangered in 1973.

Sightings of the San Bruno elfin butterfly have been made adjacent to the Fitzgerald Marine Reserve in Montara. This endangered species has very limited range and habitat.

The active Seal Cove Fault (first mapped and named by William Glen in a 1959 publication of the University of California series in the geological sciences) forms much of the eastern boundary of the site. Glen first suggested that the Seal Cove fault was a northward extension of the San Gregorio fault. Submarine surveys later found that the fault extends northward under the Pacific Ocean and presumably joins the San Andreas Fault near Bolinas. The fault's trace was formerly clearly exposed in a sea cliff at the northern portion of the reserve, but is now obscured by cultural changes.

== Details of habitats ==
The coastal strand habitat lies between the Pacific Ocean and the upper edge of the beach or coastal marsh. Species enjoying this niche are the California sea lion, harbor seal, Snowy egret, Great blue heron, cormorant and a variety of terns, murres, gulls and other shorebirds. Within the tidepool area there are also sea urchins, sea anemones, hermit crabs and numerous other mollusks.

The flanks of San Vicente Creek and another unnamed drainage further south in the preserve are coastal salt marsh habitat. This niche is an important nesting and feeding area for many bird species including rails. Since this marsh lacks cordgrass, it is a poor nesting site of ducks. Dense pickleweed provides good habitat for a variety of rodents, reptiles and rabbits.

North of the salt marsh of Vicente Creek lies the freshwater marsh and seepage, which hosts a number of trees supporting bird-life and mammals. The arroyo willow here is important to migrating warblers and other passerines.

== Nearby features of interest ==
At the southern edge of the reserve lies the Moss Beach Distillery, a California Point of Historical Interest, that has served as a clifftop restaurant since 1927. In the area of the former Dolger house there is a old road cut down to the beach below the Distillery restaurant. On the landward side of the road cut are the remnants of an old indian shell mound. To the east of the reserve is the Seal Cove Inn, a luxury destination country inn operated by noted travel author Karen Brown.

The opening sequence of the movie Memoirs of a Geisha was filmed on the bluffs overlooking the Reserve.

== See also ==
- Pillar Point Bluff
