= SeaHugger =

US-based non-profit organization

Sea Hugger
- Formation: 2018; 8 years ago
- Founder: Shell Cleave
- Type: 501(c)(3) Nonprofit
- Tax ID no.: 83-1463002
- Headquarters: Half Moon Bay, California, U.S.
- Methods: Beach cleanups Environmental education Advocacy
- Website: seahugger.org

Sea Hugger is an American nonprofit organization that works to reduce plastic pollution in the ocean through beach cleanups, environmental education, and advocacy. It was founded in 2018 by Shell Cleave and is based in Half Moon Bay, California.

Sea Hugger makes use of seabins provided by The Seabin Project to clean oceans.

== History ==
Sea Hugger was founded in 2018 by Michelle "Shell" Cleave, a Half Moon Bay surfer who closed her technical writing business to establish the organization. She was partly inspired by a diving trip to the Great Barrier Reef, where she observed large areas of dead and bleached coral.

By January 2019, Sea Hugger had adopted Dunes Beach in Half Moon Bay and begun holding regular cleanups there on the third Saturday of each month. It also acquired a trommel for removing microplastics such as nurdles from beach sand, and raised the money through a GoFundMe campaign.

In August 2019, Sea Hugger installed a Seabin, a floating, pump-driven trash collector developed by the Australian Seabin Project, at Pillar Point Harbor as a pilot project. It was the first such device in the San Francisco Bay Area and the second on the West Coast. The project was funded by a grant from the San Mateo County Office of Sustainability, which also funded the organization's beach cleanups and educational programs.

In October 2019, Cleave published The Littlest Sea Hugger, a children's book that describes Sea Hugger's role in cleaning the environment.

In January 2020, Sea Hugger received the Green Business Award from the Half Moon Bay Coastside Chamber of Commerce and Visitors' Bureau.

In 2021, Shell Cleave received Jefferson Award for Public Service for her public service as part of Sea Hugger. The annual Sand and Sea Fest, which benefits Sea Hugger, began in 2022. Its second edition, held at Montara State Beach in June 2023, included a volleyball tournament, surf contest, and beach cleanup.

Cleave died in December 2025.

== Programs ==
Sea Hugger organizes community beach cleanups in Half Moon Bay and encourages people to hold their own cleanups elsewhere. In 2021, it was holding cleanups twice a month that collected debris ranging from plastic bottle caps to cigarette butts. It also lobbied for conservation laws and supported efforts to reduce dependence on plastic.

The organization also runs education programs for children. During the COVID-19 pandemic, its on-campus lessons gave way to Camp Sea Hugger, an outdoor education program held on an old school bus at Pillar Point Harbor, which hundreds of families paid to attend.

Outside the United States, Sea Hugger has supported Litter4Tokens, a program in South Africa modeled on a Mexican initiative in which families exchange bags of collected trash for tokens used to buy food, clothing, and other necessities. As of 2021, Sea Hugger was providing the program with monthly support, and the program had collected more than 4,000 pounds (1,800 kg) of plastic over two years.
