= Pillar Point Air Force Station =

US Air Force Station in California

Coordinates: 37.497902°N 122.499876°W

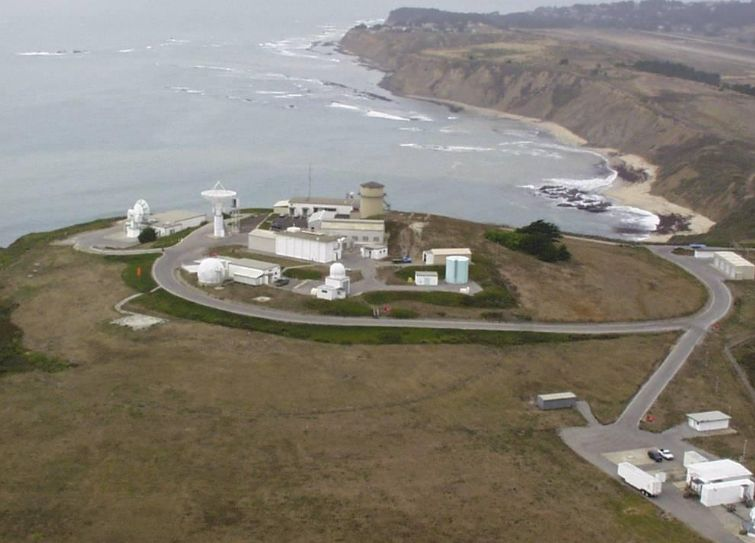
Pillar Point Air Force Station

Pillar Point Air Force Station, formerly Pillar Point Military Reservation, is a United States Space Force facility, situated on 48 acres atop the coastal promontory Pillar Point, near the community of Princeton-by-the-Sea, California. The station overlooks Pillar Point Harbor and Mavericks Beach to the east and Pillar Point Bluff to the west. Pillar Point is 15 miles south of the City of San Francisco in San Mateo County.

The facility was built and founded on October 10, 1940, as part of the World War II harbor defenses of San Francisco, as there was concern that Japan might attack San Francisco. Large artillery, .50-caliber machine guns for anti-aircraft defense, searchlights, barracks, concrete bunkers, cyclone fences, and an electric system were installed for defensive measures. In June 1944, a short-range UHF Surface Craft Detection Radar System, model SCR-296, built by Western Electric Company was installed. The SCR-296 could detect and track seagoing surface craft.

After the war, on January 17, 1946, the radar system was removed. In 1949 the Military Reservation was closed. The US Navy opened the base on September 4, 1959, as a missile tracking station in support of Naval Air Station Point Mugu's Regulus missile program and later Minuteman missiles. In the 1960s the base was transferred to the US Air Force, which then maintained the missile tracking station. From 1967 to 1972, the station tracked Minuteman II missiles. The current tracking units are AN/FPQ-6 and AN/MPS-36 radars systems, which are C-band radar from the Western Range (USSF) of Vandenberg Air Force Base. Pillar Point is presently used by the United States Space Force for tracking polar-orbiting space satellite and operational intercontinental ballistic missiles launched from Vandenberg, the United States Navy, and the United States Air Force Special Operations Command. Breakwaters were installed in 1961 and a second in 1982 to protect the area from erosion, with mixed results.

The peninsula is 0.3 miles (483 m) wide and 0.25 miles (402 m) long, with an elevation from 80 to 180 ft (24 to 55 m). It is connected to the coast by a narrow isthmus on the northeastern side, with Pillar Point Bluff, a county park, almost perpendicular to it. In the 19th century, the land where Pillar Point Air Force Station now resides was part of Rancho Corral de Tierra. It was given to Francisco Guerrero y Palomares by Mexico before California became a US state in 1850. The area was used for farming and grassland pasture until World War II. Just north of the base was Half Moon Bay Flight Strip, an auxiliary airfield for Salinas Army Air Base training used during the war. The Half Moon Bay Flight Strip is now Eddie Andreini Sr. Airfield. There is a prehistoric artifact site, CA-SMA-151, at the station, which is listed on the National Register of Historic Places.

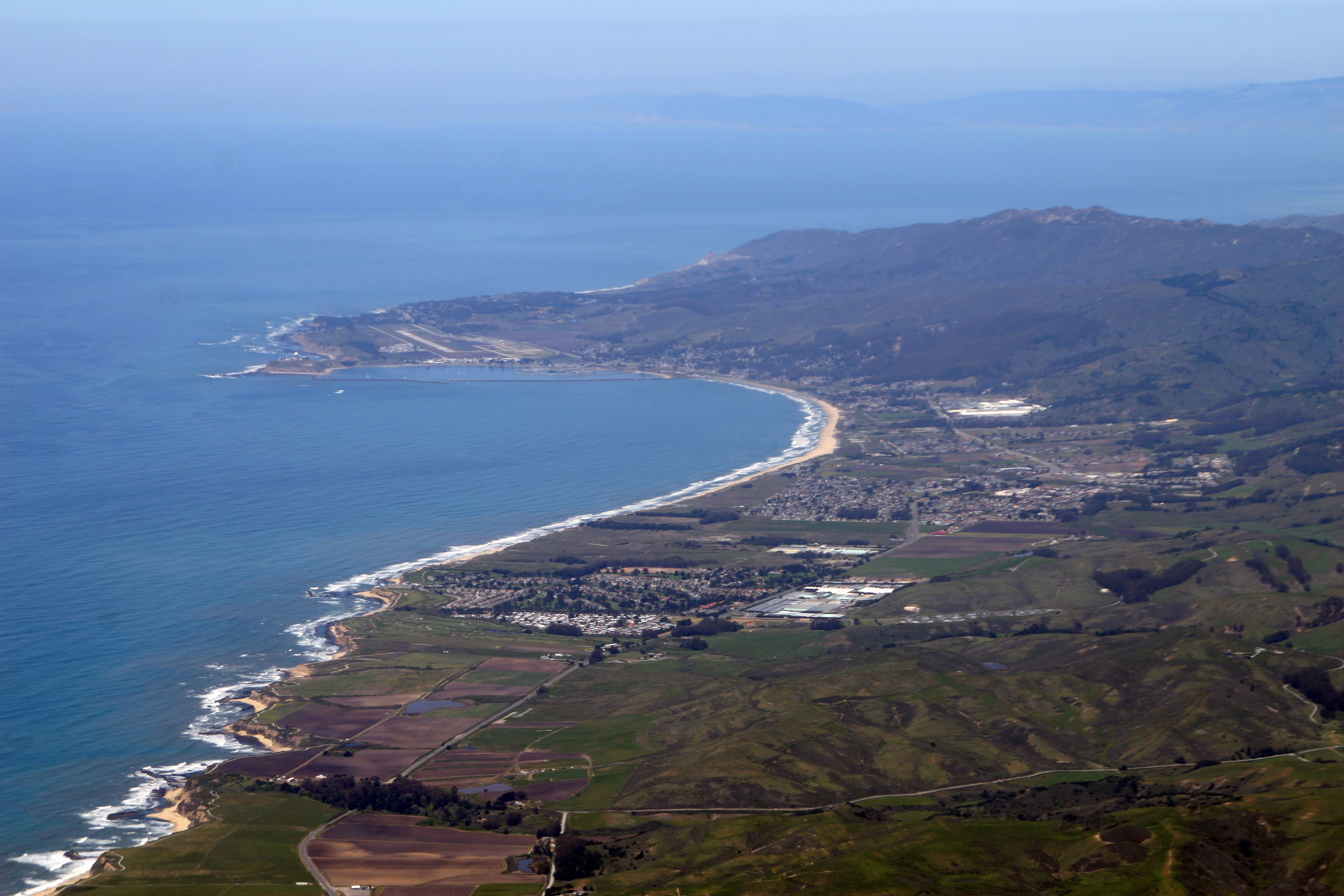
Pillar Point (top) and Half Moon Bay, looking north, 2009

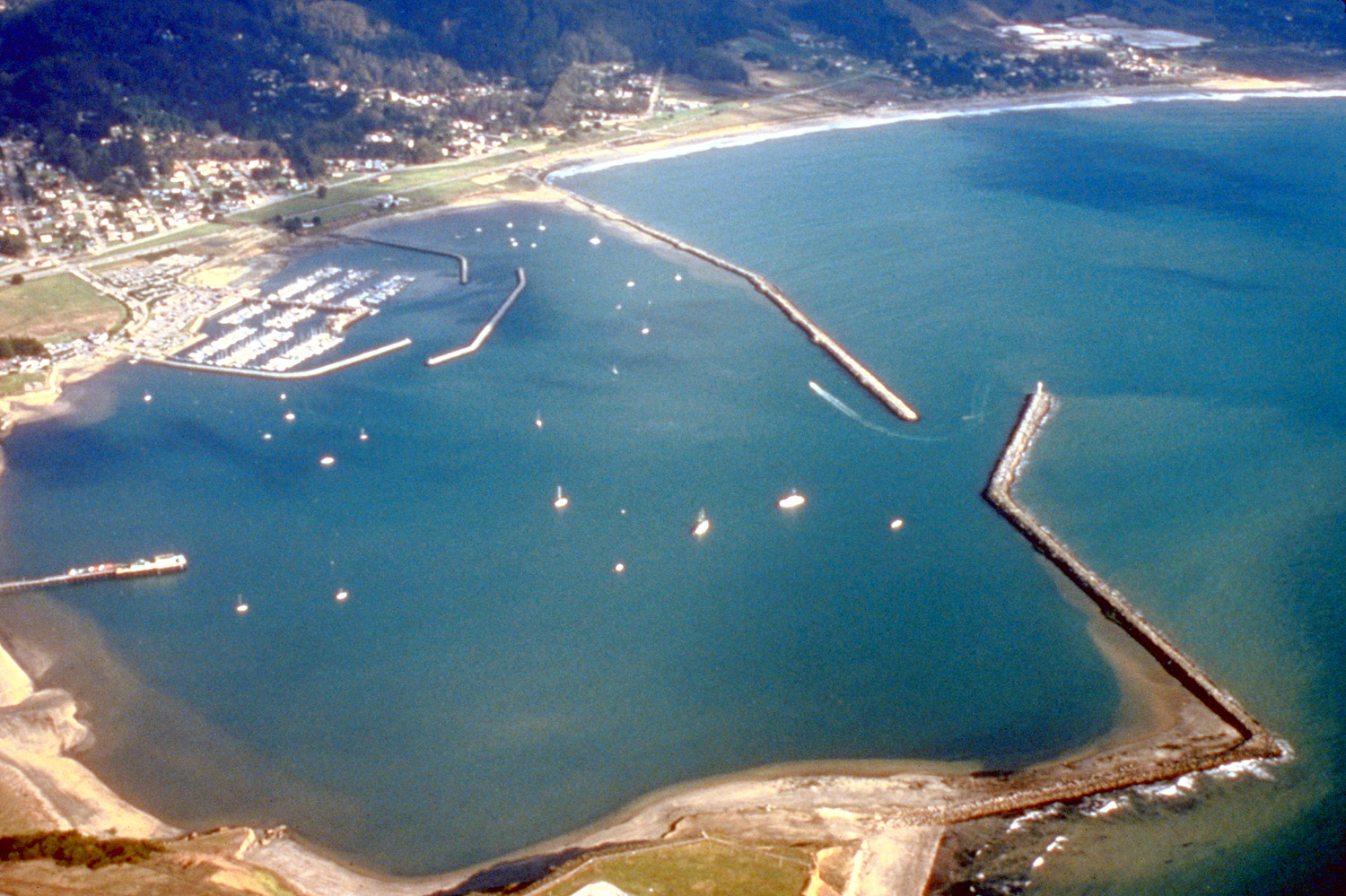
Aerial view of Pillar Point Harbor looking east. The 1967 breakwater extension is at the center right; the 1982 inner breakwater is at the upper left

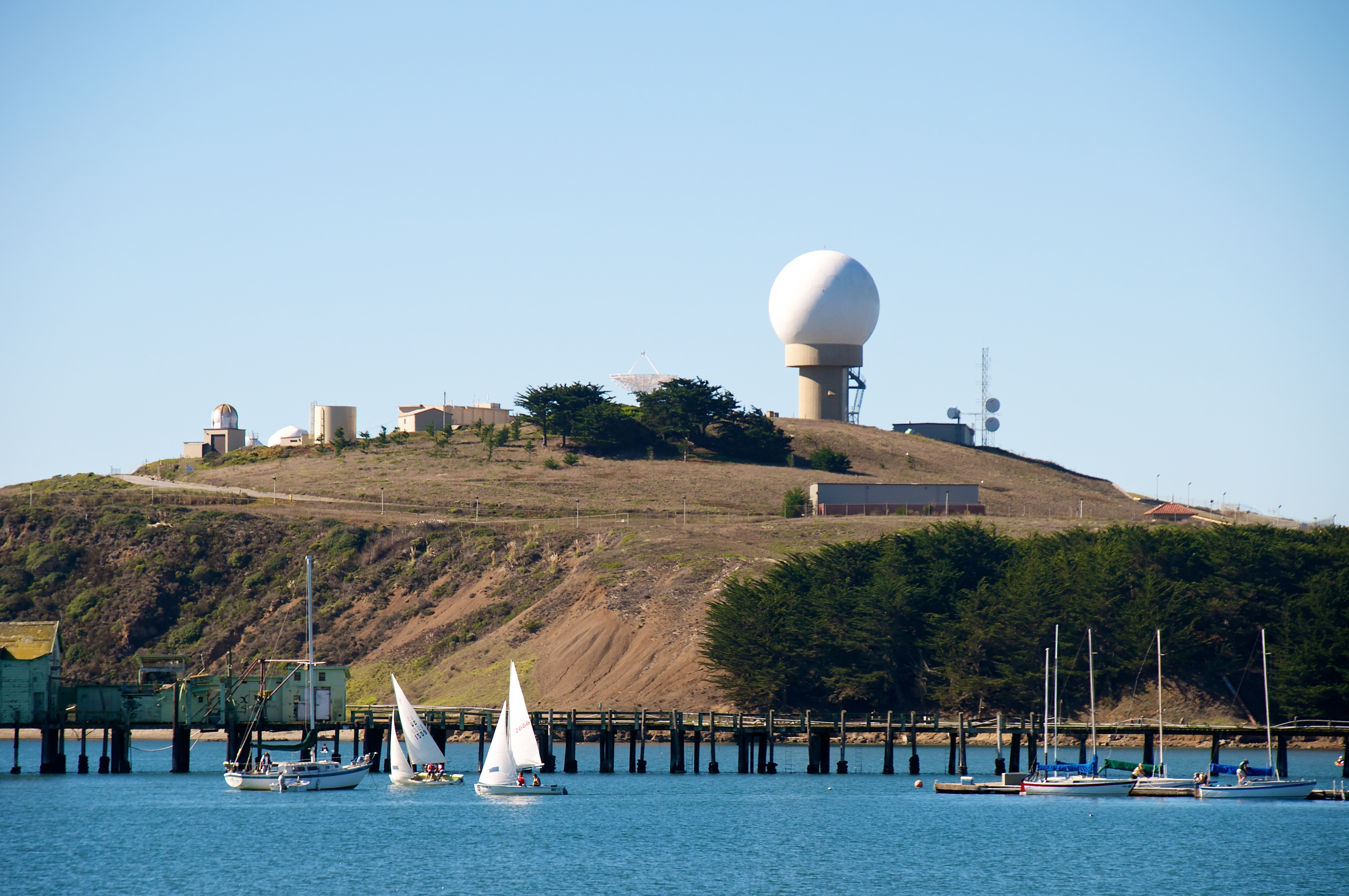
Boats in front of the Pillar Point Air Force Station in the Pillar Point Harbor, 2012

== See also ==
- California during World War II
- American Theater (1939–1945)
- United States home front during World War II
