= San Mateo Daily Journal =

- Type: Daily newspaper
- Format: Broadsheet
- Owner(s): SMDJ LLC
- Publisher: Jerry Lee
- Editor-in-chief: Jon Mays
- Founded: 2000
- Language: English
- Headquarters: 1720 S. Amphlett Blvd. Suite 123; San Mateo, CA 94402; United States
- Website: smdailyjournal.com

The San Mateo Daily Journal is a daily newspaper published six days a week, Monday through Friday plus a combo weekend edition.

The newspaper is distributed throughout San Mateo County, California. It is one of the few independently owned and operated newspapers in the San Francisco Bay Area. The Washington Post stated that the paper is one of the few publications that report on East Palo Alto within San Mateo County.

== History ==
In 2000, the newspaper was founded. In 2008, there was an incident of racks of the papers being cleaned out by a man working for a competing newspaper, Palo Alto Daily Post.
