= Pillar Point Harbor =

Harbor in San Mateo County, California

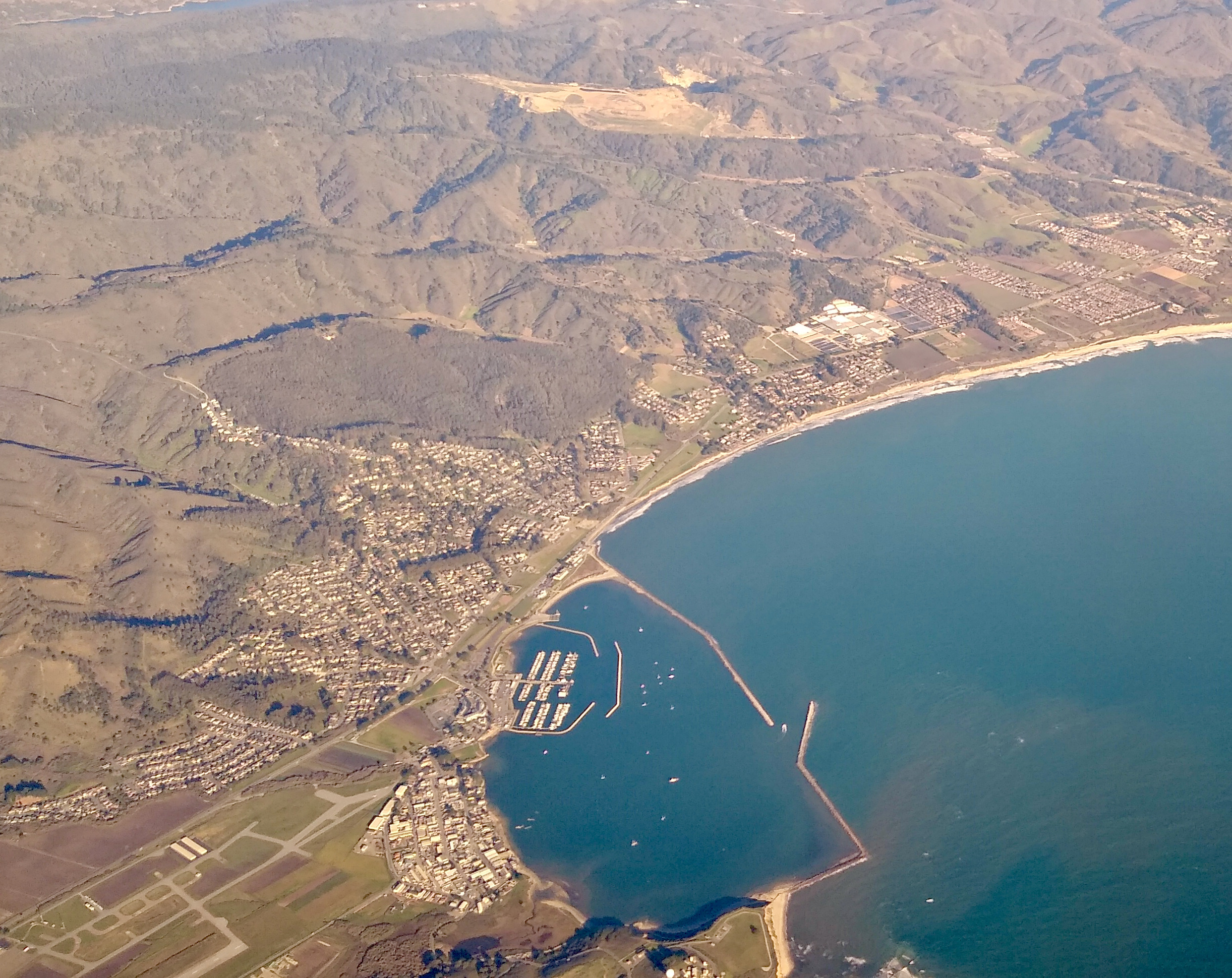
- Aerial view from the east
- Interactive map of Pillar Point Harbor
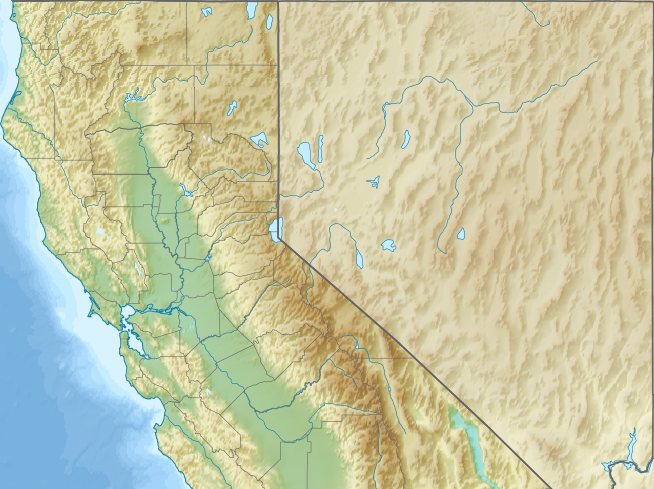
- Location within Northern California

Location
- Country: USA
- Location: San Mateo County, California
- Coordinates: 37°29′57.75″N 122°29′16.91″W

Pillar Point Harbor is a boat harbor created by a riprap breakwater in San Mateo County, California, immediately north of Half Moon Bay. It is used by both pleasure craft and small commercial fishing boats.

The Ohlone people inhabited the region until the 19th century, and a number of recorded shipwrecks occurred in the immediate area. The modern harbor facilities were constructed between 1959 and 1982. The harbor facilities are managed by the San Mateo County Harbor District.

== Location ==
The harbor is situated at the north end of the semicircular bay called Half Moon Bay, and is at the extreme north edge of the city of Half Moon Bay, the southwest edge of the town of El Granada and the southern edge of the unincorporated community of Princeton-by-the-Sea.

The big wave surfing location in Mavericks is about a half mile (1 km) outside Pillar Point Harbor.

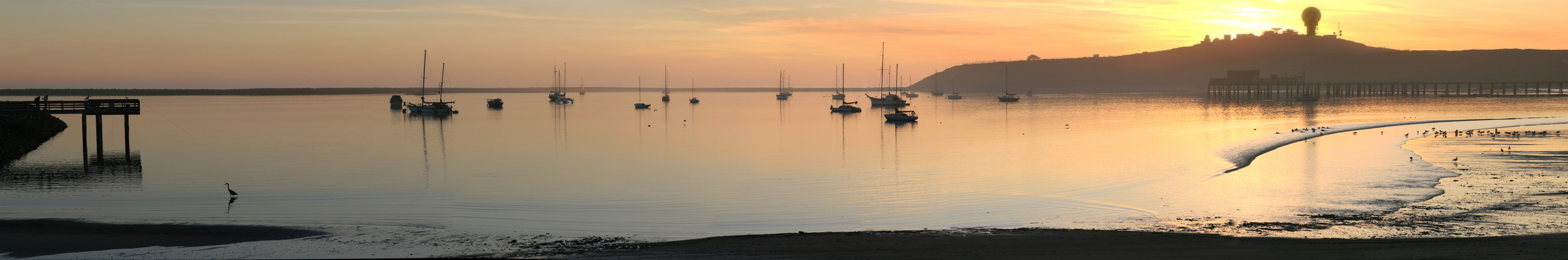
Pillar Point Harbor

== History ==
=== Early history ===
Before European contact, and through much of the 19th century, the Ohlone tribe lived in the region, especially in the riparian zone of El Granada Creek. The National Register of Historic Places indicates an Ohlone archaeological site, Archeological Site SMA-151, in the area of the Pillar Point Air Force Station on the bluff overlooking the harbor. The first European land exploration of Alta California, the Spanish Portolà expedition, passed through the area on its way north, camping just south of the harbor on October 28, 1769. In his expedition diary, missionary Juan Crespi described Pillar Point.

=== 19th century ===
By the early 19th century Russian fur trappers plied this portion of the Northern California coast. By 1859 part of the area was owned by James G. Denniston, a California state assemblyman who represented San Mateo County. He built a deep-water landing at Pillar Point which for many years was a key port for lumber, produce and other material destined for San Francisco.

... a reminder of more than 85 sailing ships wrecked on the San Mateo County coastside in the last half of the nineteenth century.

— Plaque near the anchor of the Rydal Hall,

Many shipwrecks and other nautical accidents occurred in this area of the Pacific Ocean coastline. The ship Rydal Hall was wrecked in October 1876 near Pillar Point while carrying coal destined for San Francisco. In 1971 the ship's anchor was recovered and is still on display outside a nearby restaurant.

=== 20th century ===
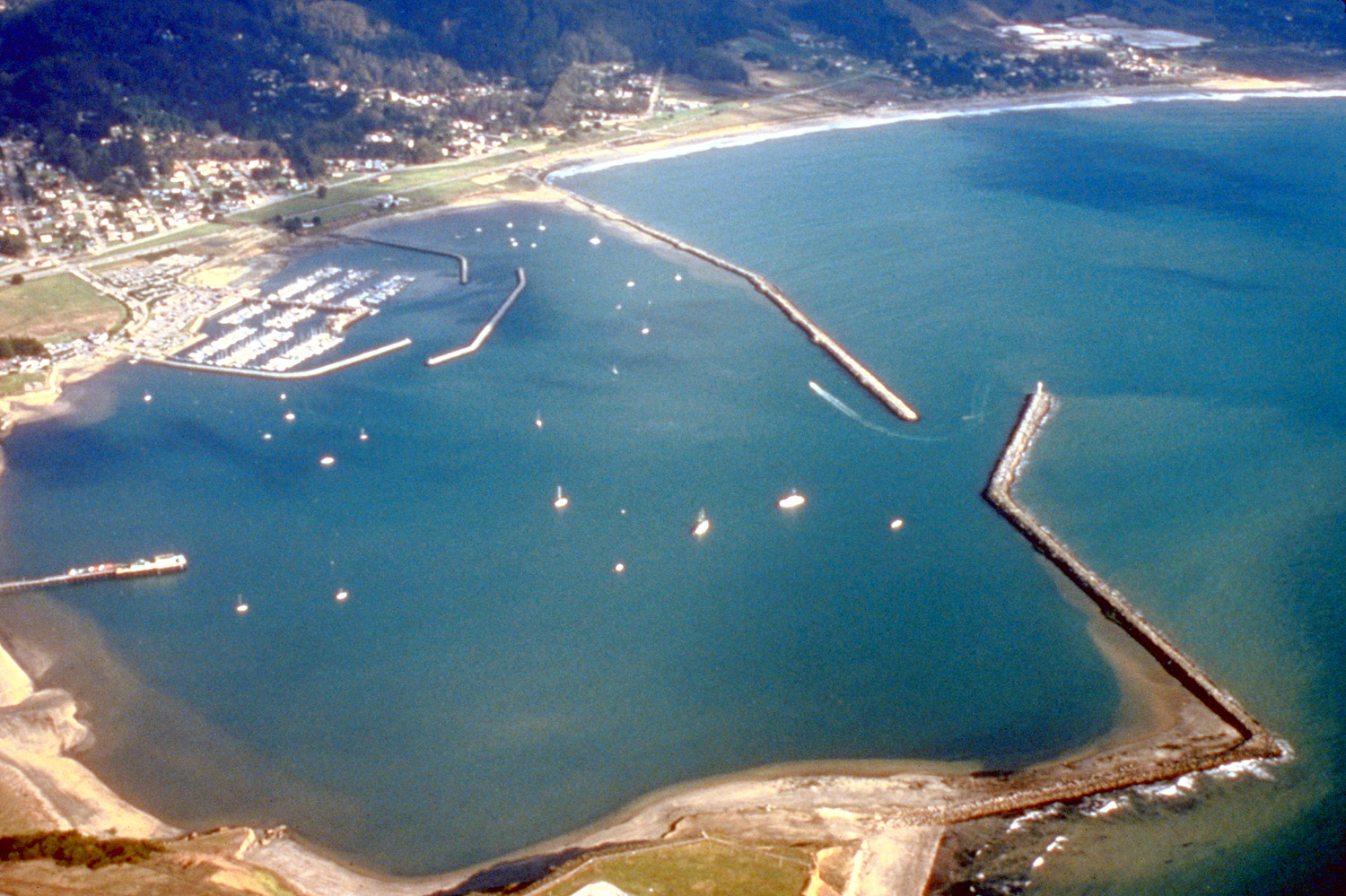
Aerial view of Pillar Point Harbor looking east. The 1967 breakwater extension is at the center right. The 1982 inner breakwater is at the upper left.

In the twentieth century the harbor was used by small fishing boats, though fierce winter storms sometimes destroyed boats even when in the harbor. From 1959 to 1961, the Army Corps of Engineers constructed a riprap breakwater to protect the harbor. At that time a pier, the Harbor Master's office, and other facilities were also built, and a foghorn was installed. However it was soon found that the breakwater did not provide protection from southwesterly storm waves, which surged through the breakwater opening. In 1967 the western arm of the breakwater was extended by 1,050 feet (320 m) in an attempt to block such waves. That solution also proved inadequate, so in 1982 an inner breakwater was built.

The outer breakwater diverts storm waves to nearby shores, increasing erosion drastically in some places. A line of nearby bluffs eroded back 150 feet (46 m) in the 35 years after the breakwater was built, despite an attempt in the 1960s to shield the bluffs with a riprap barrier.

The San Mateo County Harbor District has maintained a Harbor Master's Office and rescue station there since 1970. For almost twenty years (1978–1996) the Harbor Master, Robert McMahon and his various crews, achieved recognition from the Coast Guard for being the first responders and saving hundreds of lives.

In 2019, a seabin was installed at the harbor by SeaHugger to capture floating plastic waste.

== See also ==
- Denniston Creek
