= Princeton-by-the-Sea, California =

Unincorporated community in California, United States

Coordinates: 37°30′18″N 122°29′09″W

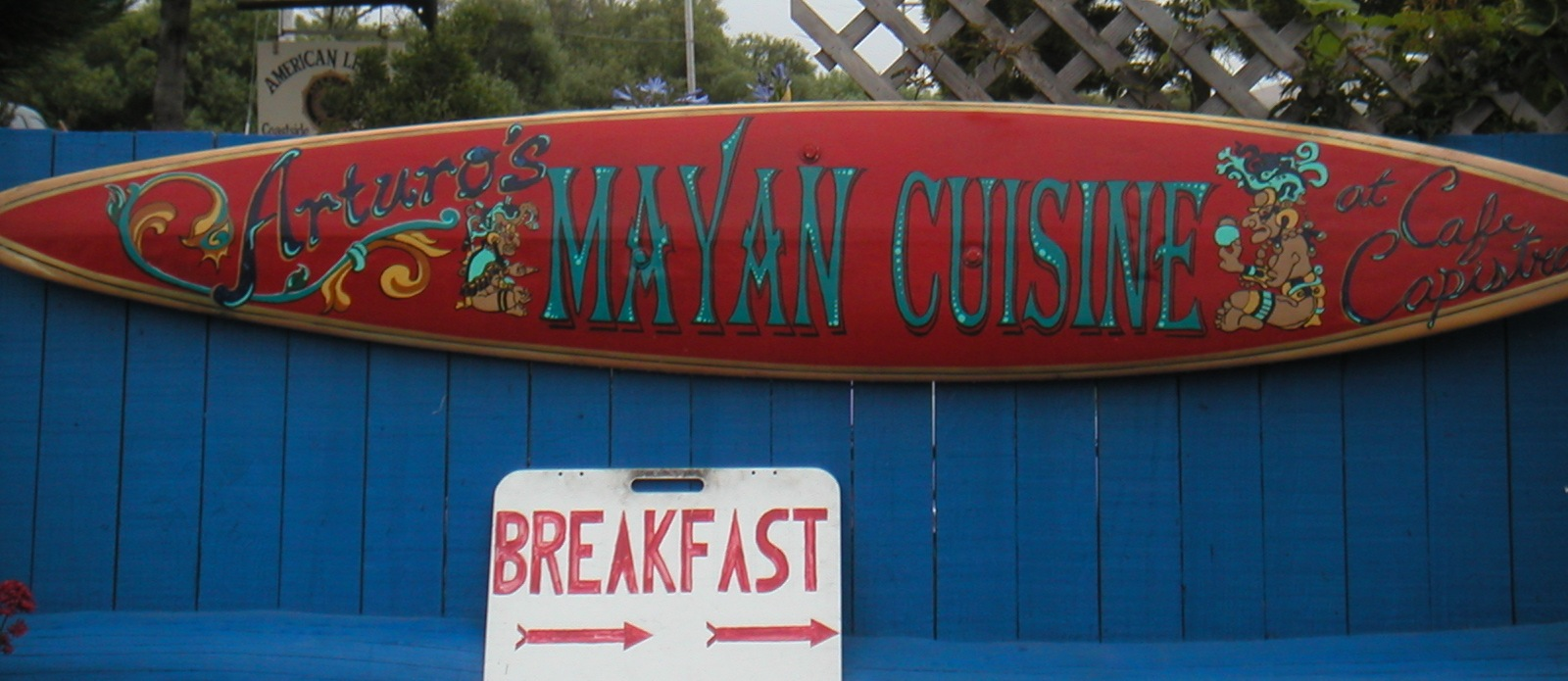
Restaurant sign in Princeton-by-the-Sea, 2006

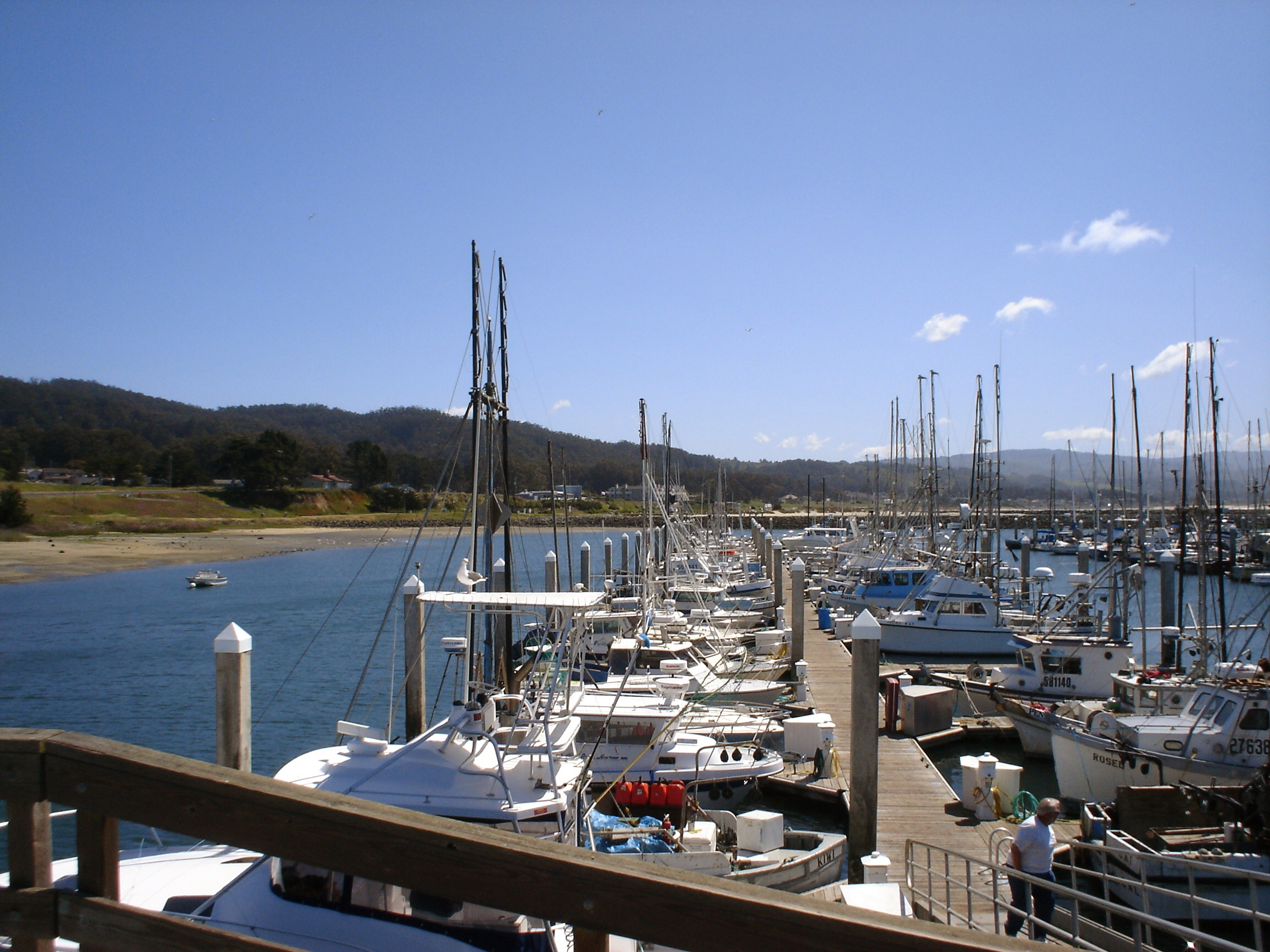
Pillar Point Harbor in April 2007

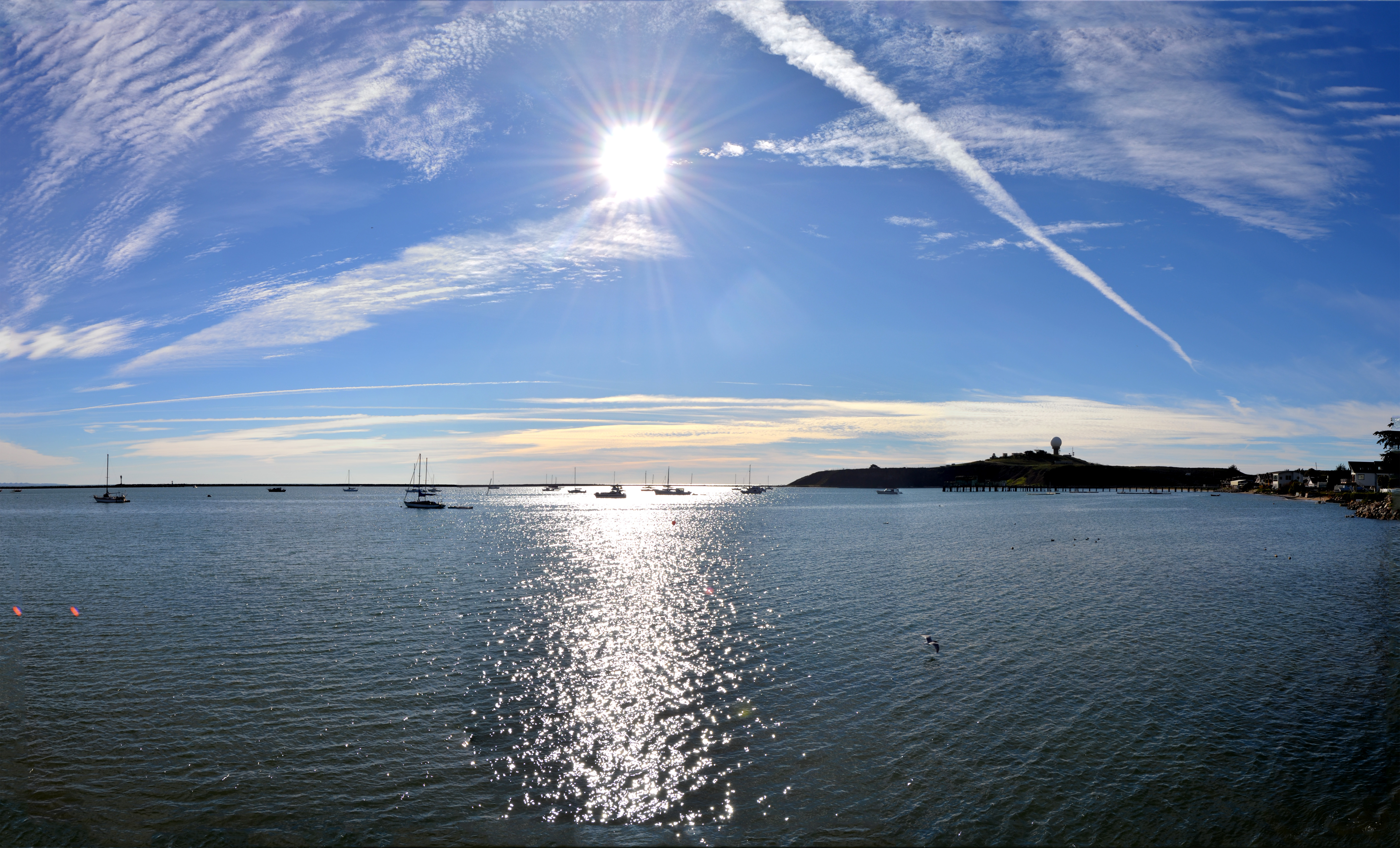
Pillar Point Harbor on Christmas 2014

Princeton-by-the-Sea (sometimes, especially locally, called Princeton) is an unincorporated community on the coast of San Mateo County, California, United States. The ZIP code is 94019 and the community is served by area code 650. As of 2000, the population of the community was 297.

== Location ==
Princeton-by-the-Sea is on the San Mateo Coast, west of the Cabrillo Highway (California State Route 1), immediately across the highway from El Granada and just to the north of the northernmost city limits of Half Moon Bay.

Princeton overlooks Pillar Point Harbor, and Mavericks Beach, Pillar Point Bluff, and Pillar Point Air Force Station are just to the west. The Half Moon Bay Airport is just north of the community, between Princeton and Moss Beach. Because it shares a zip code with Half Moon Bay, addresses within Princeton are often listed as being in that city.

== Profile ==
This area was inhabited by Ohlone tribes in pre-Columbian times. According to mission records, the Chiguan Ohlones, who numbered about 50, called the place Ssatumnumo, and had a second village, Chagunte, near Half Moon Bay.

The area has a boating cachet for harbor activities and has been a tourist destination since the early 1900s with the establishment of the Princeton Inn Hotel. Besides the harbor, with its piers and docks, Princeton has a number of shops, restaurants, and accommodations.

== Geography ==
This community is located on level ground at an elevation of five feet (1.5 m) above mean sea datum (U.S. Geological Survey, 1980). The soil in the Princeton-by-the-Sea vicinity has good drainage, since the surface consists of marine deposits with underlying water bearing sediments of unconsolidated sand and gravel deposits (Earth Metrics, 1989). Until 1973 extensive row crop farming was conducted immediately at the northern edge of Princeton.

== Wildlife ==
Because of the special microhabitat of the adjacent Pillar Point Harbor, there are numerous pelagic birds that visit the local area.

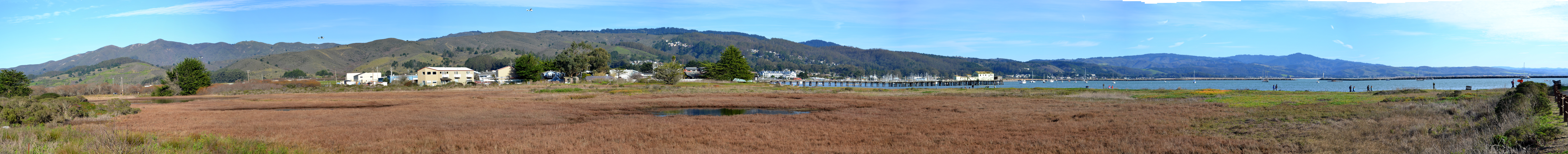
A panorama of Princeton-by-the-Sea from Breakwater
