= Montara State Beach =

State park in California, United States

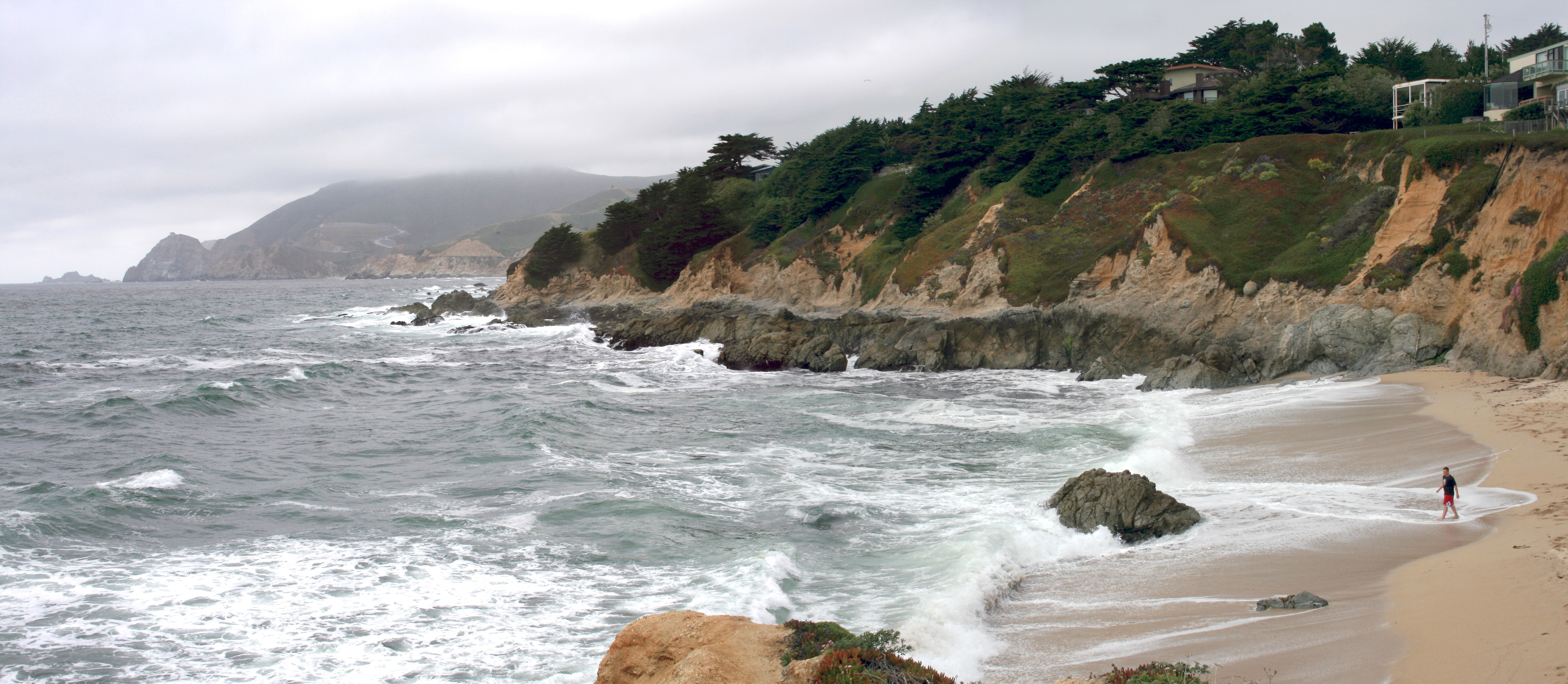

- Location within California Location within the United States
- Location: San Mateo County, California
- Nearest city: Half Moon Bay
- Coordinates: 37°32′53″N 122°30′49″W
- Governing body: California Department of Parks and Recreation

Montara State Beach is a beach located in the coastal region of the U.S. state of California, eight miles north of Half Moon Bay on State Route 1. West of Highway 1, it showcases high bluffs and sandy shores. It is operated by the California State Department of Parks and Recreation under the San Mateo Coast Sector Office. It is one of the cleanest beaches in the state and is known for surfing, sunbathing, nature study and fishing.

Montara State Marine Reserve & Pillar Point State Marine Conservation Area extends offshore from Montara State Beach.

== Facilities and regulations ==
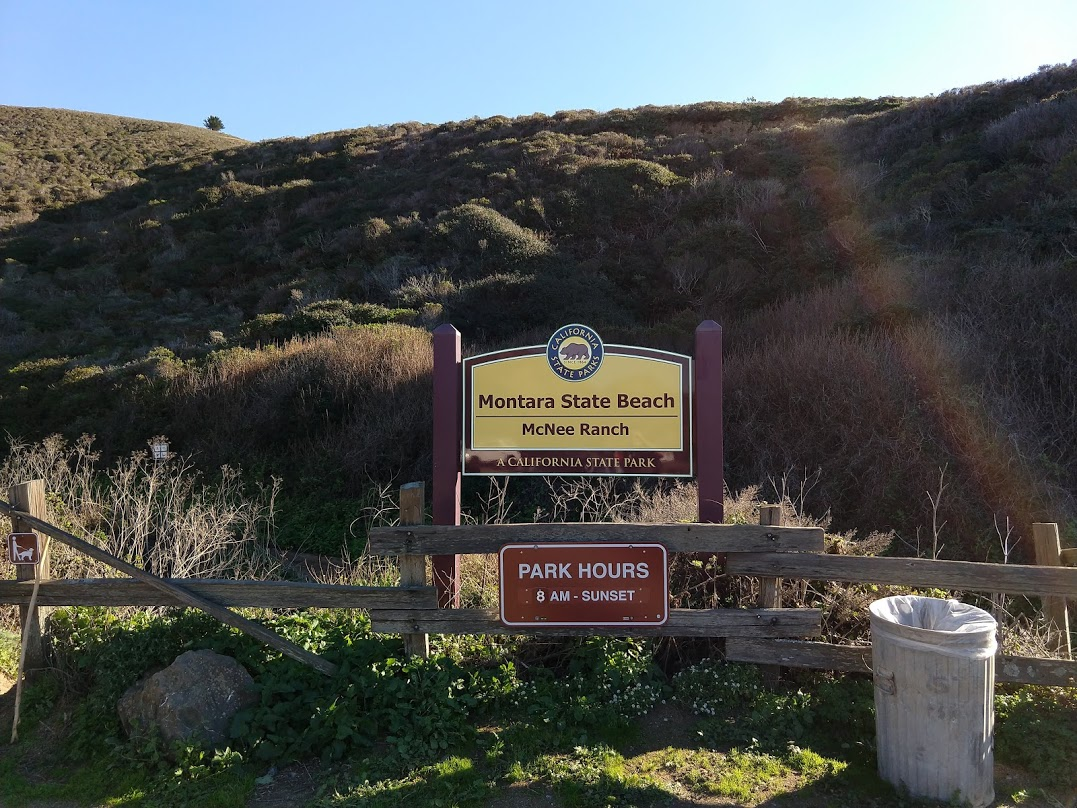
McNee Ranch trailhead at Gray Whale Cove, Montara State Beach

There are two beach access points from the bluffs area. One access point is across from Second St while the other is about 1/2 mile north.The park hours are 8:00 a.m. to sunset. Camping is not permitted. Dogs are allowed on-leash (6 ft (1.8 m) maximum). Fireworks and fires are not permitted. Online reservations are not available.

There are bike, hiking, and horseback trails. The Devil's Slide is at the north end of the beach and the trail starts from a beach parking lot. A lighthouse operated as a hostel is part of the state park.

The 690 acres (280 ha) McNee Ranch, on Montara Mountain, encompasses coastal mountain habitat and has sweeping views of the coast. Three trails can be found at the Martini Creek trailhead. San Pedro Mountain road takes visitors to views spanning from Mount Tamalpais to Mount Diablo. The ranch's two-mile Pedro Mountain Trail connects to trails leading to Montara Beach and Gray Whale Cove.

== History ==
Before the arrival of Europeans, Native Americans lived along the San Mateo coast. The Chiguan tribe held control over the Montara area. Native tribes had a strong influence on the vegetation and wildlife inhabiting the coast. Accounts say tribes offered food to Europeans upon their arrival. The Chiguan tribe, along with the other tribes located throughout the bay area, are now known as the Ohlone people.

Juan Rodríguez Cabrillo first sailed his ship along the coast in 1542. He and explorers created names for the areas that are still used to this day.

The first European land exploration of Alta California, the Spanish Portolà expedition, camped in this area on October 30, 1769, possibly at Martini Creek, which reaches the sea at Montara beach (Bolton says San Vicente Creek, farther south). Franciscan missionary Juan Crespi noted in his diary.

We stopped not far from the shore at the foot of some hills which prevent us from passing along the beach. They form a valley sheltered from the north, from which flows an arroyo with plenty of good water...on account of the large number of mussels which they found on this beach, very good and large, the men called it Punta de las Almejas.

— Juan Crespí

== Nature and Wildlife ==
The San Mateo Coast State beaches have an abundance of wildlife and nature. Montara State beach is home to both native and non-native plant species. Native specie communities include coastal prairie, riparian, and freshwater and saltwater marsh. Non-native communities such as grassland, eucalyptus, and alders are also present. Along the low dunes sit beach burr, prostrate coyote brush, yarrow, and non-native iceplant. Many different species of animal are attracted to the diverse landscapes along the San Mateo Coast.

Montara State Beach is home to a multitude of terrestrial animals. The San Francisco garter snake and California red-legged frog, both endangered species, inhabit this area. The marshes attract Raccoons, pacific tree frogs, and opossums. The sandy beaches attract willets, sanderlings, and gulls. Predators such as coyotes and hawks are found in the area.

Off of Montara State beach sit Montara State Marine Reserve and Pillar Point State Marine Conservation Area. These two Marine protected areas (MPA) cover over 18 miles of coastline and water. They are home to tidepools full of sea urchins, crabs, and nudibranchs (sea slugs). An abundance of fish, such as rockfish and lingcod, inhabit the area. The marine life attracts a multitude of people each year, coming to explore the coastline and reefs.

== See also ==
- McNee Ranch State Park
- List of beaches in California
- List of California state parks
