= Montara State Marine Reserve and Pillar Point State Marine Conservation Area =

Marine protected areas in California, US

Montara State Marine Reserve (SMR) and Pillar Point State Marine Conservation Area (SMCA) are two adjoining marine protected areas that extend offshore from Montara to Pillar Point in San Mateo County on California’s north central coast. The combined area of these marine protected areas is 18.42 square miles (47.7 km^{2}), with 11.76 square miles (30.5 km^{2}) in the SMR and 6.66 in the SMCA. Montara SMR prohibits the take of all living marine resources. Pillar Point SMCA prohibits the take of all living marine resources, except the recreational and commercial take of pelagic finfish by trolling or seine, the commercial or recreational take of Dungeness crab by trap and the commercial or recreational take or market squid by hand-held dip net or round haul net.

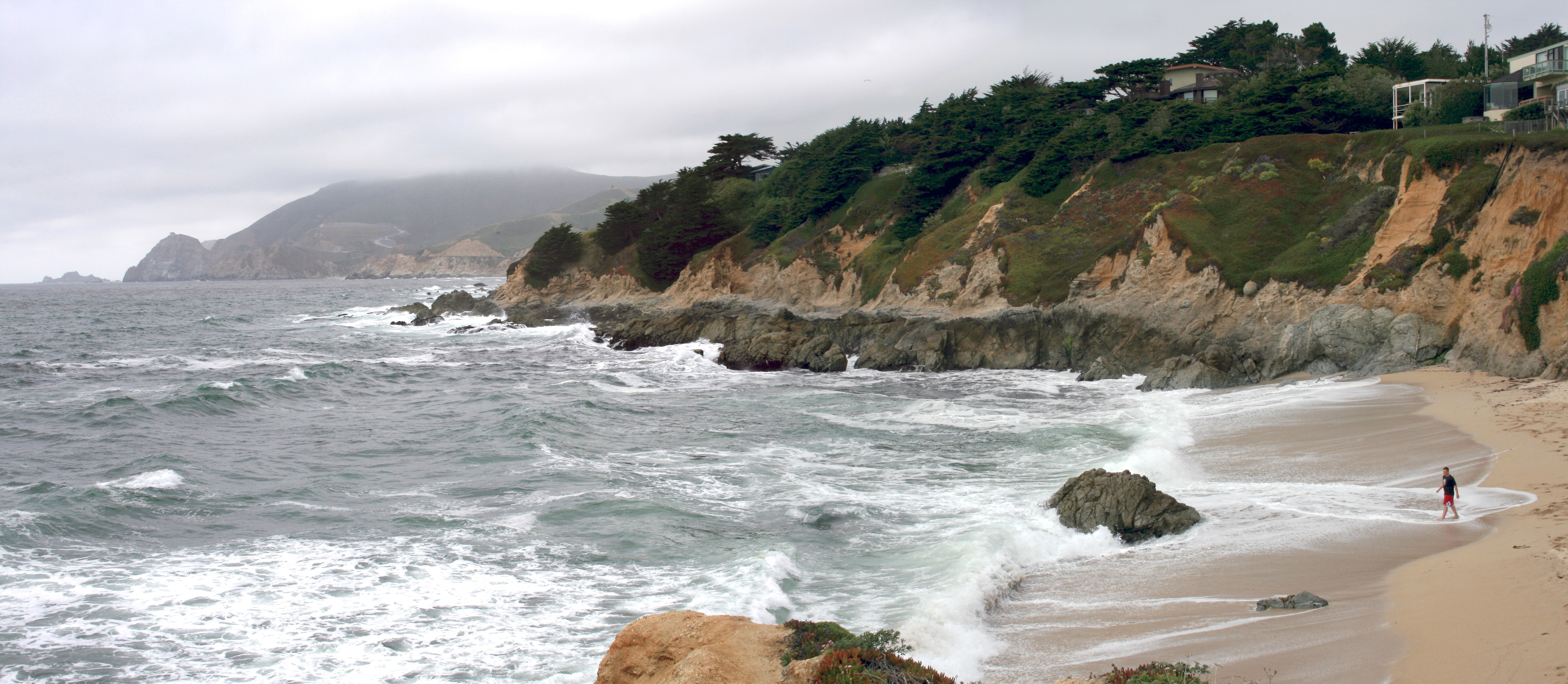
Montara Beach

== History ==
Montara SMR and Pillar Point SMCA are two of 22 marine protected areas adopted by the California Department of Fish and Game in August 2009, during the second phase of the Marine Life Protection Act Initiative. The MLPAI is a collaborative public process to create a statewide network of protected areas along California’s coastline.

The north central coast’s new marine protected areas were designed by local divers, fishermen, conservationists and scientists who comprised the North Central Coast Regional Stakeholder Group. Their job was to design a network of protected areas that would preserve sensitive sea life and habitats while enhancing recreation, study and education opportunities.

The north central coast marine protected areas took effect on May 1, 2010.

== Geography and natural features ==
Montara State Marine Reserve (SMR) and Pillar Point State Marine Conservation Area (SMCA) are two adjoining marine protected areas that extend offshore from Montara to Pillar Point in San Mateo County on California’s north central coast. Montara is approximately 20 miles (32 km) south of San Francisco, while Pillar Point is a peninsula that juts into the Pacific Ocean a few miles north of Half Moon Bay.

With a northern boundary bisecting Montara State Beach, Montara SMR includes the protected Fitzgerald Marine Reserve, which is well known for its tide pools.

Montara SMR is bounded by the mean high tide line and straight lines connecting the following points in the order listed except where noted:

1. 37°32.7′N 122°31′W
2. 37°32.7′N 122°34.91′W thence southward along the three nautical mile offshore boundary to
3. 37°30′N 122°34.61′W and
4. 37°30′N 122°29.93′W.

Pillar Point SMCA is bounded by the mean high tide line and straight lines connecting the following points in the order listed except where noted:

1. 37°30′N 122°29.93′W
2. 37°30′N 122°34.61′W thence southward along the three nautical mile offshore boundary to
3. 37°28.33′N 122°33.47′W
4. 37°28.33′N 122°30.83′W
5. 37°29.18′N 122°30.36′W and
6. 37°29.74′N 122°29.97′W.

== Habitat and wildlife ==
Moss Beach, within Montara SMR, is a hotspot of intertidal biodiversity. The rich and varied tide pools contain a remarkable assortment of mussels, barnacles, nudibranchs, starfish, and crabs. Shallow nearshore shale and granite reefs, seagrass beds, giant kelp stands, and rock pinnacles and ridges provide homes for hundreds of species of marine life, such as prickleback eels, sharks and rays, as well as six native species found nowhere else in the world.

== Recreation and nearby attractions ==
Big wave surfers and their fans travel from around the world to catch a glimpse of the giant waves that break at "Mavericks" off nearby Pillar Point. Montara State Beach is a popular destination for area visitors just north of the SMR, as are the tide pools at the Fitzgerald Marine Reserve, which will be further protected and enhanced with the creation of Montara SMR in the surrounding waters.

Point Montara Light Station features an historic lighthouse. Just north is Gray Whale Cove State Beach, gray whales are often spotted from the bluff above a sheltered cove.

Montara SMR prohibits the take of all living marine resources. Pillar Point SMCA prohibits the take of all living marine resources, except the recreational and commercial take of pelagic finfish by trolling or seine, the commercial or recreational take of Dungeness crab by trap and the commercial or recreational take or market squid by hand-held dip net or round haul net. However, California’s marine protected areas encourage recreational and educational uses of the ocean. Activities such as kayaking, diving, snorkeling, and swimming are allowed unless otherwise restricted.

== Scientific monitoring ==
As specified by the Marine Life Protection Act, select marine protected areas along California’s central coast are being monitored by scientists to track their effectiveness and learn more about ocean health. Similar studies in marine protected areas located off of the Santa Barbara Channel Islands have already detected gradual improvements in fish size and number.
