= El Granada, California =

El Granada
- census-designated place
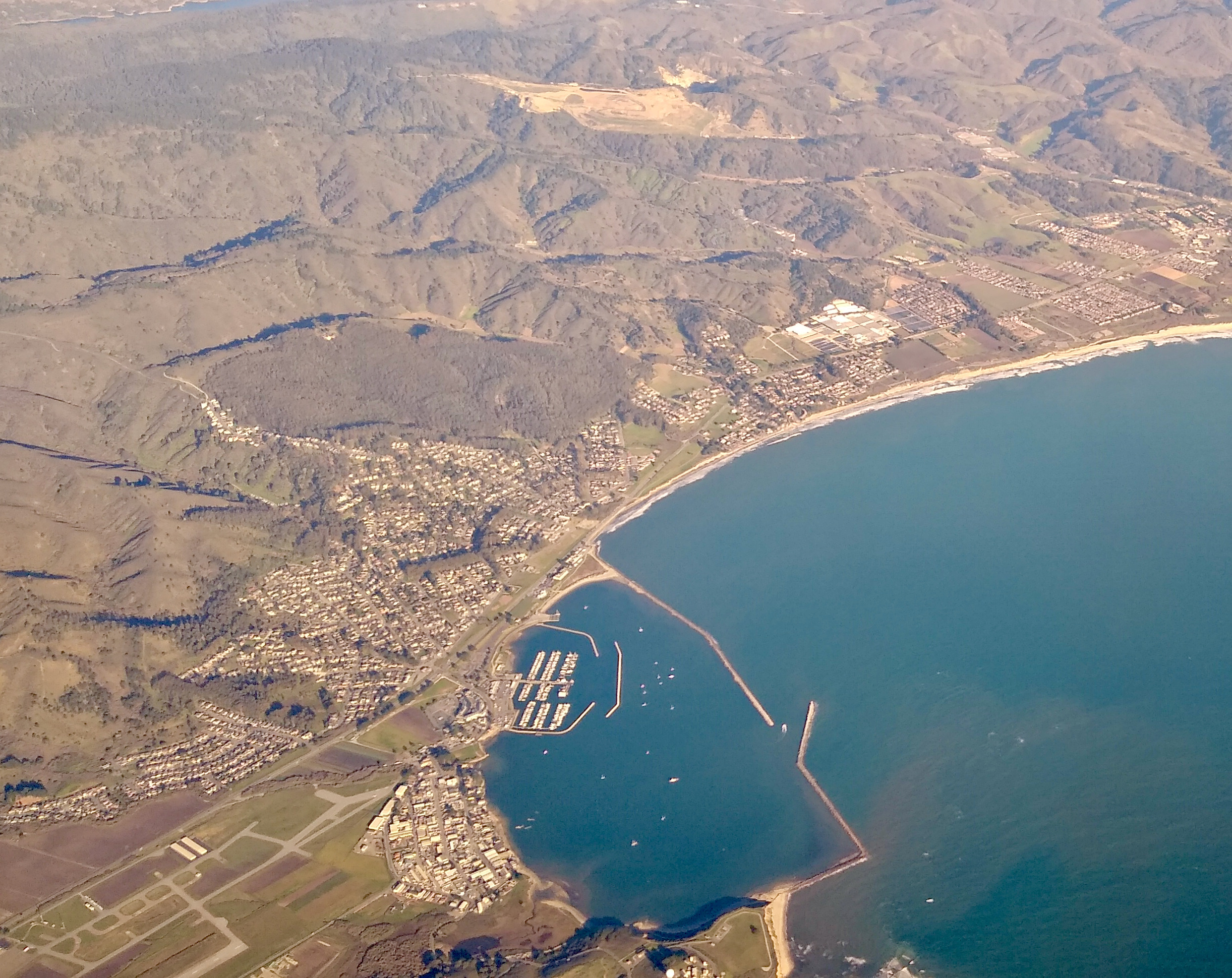
- Aerial photograph of El Granada

- Location in San Mateo County and the state of California

- Location in the United States
- Coordinates: 37°30′14″N 122°28′24″W
- Country: United States
- State: California
- County: San Mateo

Area
  - Total: 5.166 sq mi (13.379 km^{2})
  - Land: 4.919 sq mi (12.740 km^{2})
  - Water: 0.247 sq mi (0.639 km^{2}) 4.78%
- Elevation: 39 ft (12 m)

Population (2020)
  - Total: 5,481
  - Density: 1,114/sq mi (430.2/km^{2})
- Time zone: UTC-8 (PST)
  - Summer (DST): UTC-7 (PDT)
- ZIP code: 94018
- Area code: 650
- FIPS code: 06-21936
- GNIS feature ID: 1659720

El Granada is a suburban village and census-designated place (CDP) in the coastal area of northern San Mateo County, California, United States. The population was 5,481 at the 2020 census. The village is named for the city of Granada, Spain.

== Geography ==
El Granada is located at 37°30′14″N 122°28′24″W (37.503766, -122.473230), on the less densely populated Pacific coast side of San Mateo County, approximately 25 miles (40 km) south of San Francisco and 45 miles (72 km) north of Santa Cruz. Neighboring towns include Princeton-by-the-Sea immediately to the west, Moss Beach to the north, and Half Moon Bay to the south.

According to the United States Census Bureau, the CDP has a total area of 4.8 square miles (12 km^{2}), all land.

== Demographics ==
Historical population
Census	Pop.	Note	%±
1970	1,473		—
1980	3,582		143.2%
1990	4,426		23.6%
2000	5,724		29.3%
2010	5,467		−4.5%
2020	5,481		0.3%
U.S. Decennial Census; 1970 1980; 1990 2000 2010

=== 2020 census ===
As of the 2020 census, El Granada had a population of 5,481. The population density was 1,114.3 inhabitants per square mile (430.2/km^{2}). The age distribution was 17.5% under the age of 18, 6.1% aged 18 to 24, 21.3% aged 25 to 44, 34.5% aged 45 to 64, and 20.7% who were 65 years of age or older. The median age was 48.8 years. For every 100 females, there were 94.4 males, and for every 100 females age 18 and over there were 92.5 males age 18 and over.

The census reported that 99.8% of the population lived in households, 0.2% lived in non-institutionalized group quarters, and no one was institutionalized. 81.2% of residents lived in urban areas, while 18.8% lived in rural areas.

There were 2,171 households, out of which 25.1% had children under the age of 18. 58.3% were married-couple households, 7.0% were cohabiting couple households, 20.9% had a female householder with no spouse or partner present, and 13.8% had a male householder with no spouse or partner present. 21.1% of households were one person, and 9.0% were one person aged 65 or older. The average household size was 2.52. There were 1,523 families (70.2% of all households).

There were 2,283 housing units at an average density of 464.1 units per square mile (179.2 units/km^{2}), of which 2,171 (95.1%) were occupied. Of these, 75.8% were owner-occupied and 24.2% were occupied by renters. 4.9% of housing units were vacant. The homeowner vacancy rate was 0.4%, and the rental vacancy rate was 2.6%.

Racial composition as of the 2020 census
Race	Number	Percent
White	4,198	76.6%
Black or African American	30	0.5%
American Indian and Alaska Native	38	0.7%
Asian	255	4.7%
Native Hawaiian and Other Pacific Islander	6	0.1%
Some other race	293	5.3%
Two or more races	661	12.1%
Hispanic or Latino (of any race)	773	14.1%

=== Income and poverty ===
In 2023, the US Census Bureau estimated that the median household income was $226,384, and the per capita income was $104,601. About 0.8% of families and 4.2% of the population were below the poverty line.

=== 2010 census ===
The 2010 United States census reported that El Granada had a population of 5,467. The population density was 1,133.7 inhabitants per square mile (437.7/km^{2}). The racial makeup of El Granada was 4,608 (84.3%) White, 45 (0.8%) African American, 38 (0.7%) Native American, 190 (3.5%) Asian, 5 (0.1%) Pacific Islander, 336 (6.1%) from other races, and 245 (4.5%) from two or more races. Hispanic or Latino of any race were 813 persons (14.9%).

The Census reported that 5,453 people (99.7% of the population) lived in households, 14 (0.3%) lived in non-institutionalized group quarters, and 0 (0%) were institutionalized.

There were 2,098 households, out of which 660 (31.5%) had children under the age of 18 living in them, 1,245 (59.3%) were opposite-sex married couples living together, 163 (7.8%) had a female householder with no husband present, 69 (3.3%) had a male householder with no wife present. There were 132 (6.3%) unmarried opposite-sex partnerships, and 33 (1.6%) same-sex married couples or partnerships. 420 households (20.0%) were made up of individuals, and 124 (5.9%) had someone living alone who was 65 years of age or older. The average household size was 2.60. There were 1,477 families (70.4% of all households); the average family size was 3.00.

The population was spread out, with 1,199 people (21.9%) under the age of 18, 314 people (5.7%) aged 18 to 24, 1,269 people (23.2%) aged 25 to 44, 2,106 people (38.5%) aged 45 to 64, and 579 people (10.6%) who were 65 years of age or older. The median age was 44.5 years. For every 100 females, there were 96.4 males. For every 100 females age 18 and over, there were 95.3 males.

There were 2,198 housing units at an average density of 455.8 per square mile (176.0/km^{2}), of which 1,592 (75.9%) were owner-occupied, and 506 (24.1%) were occupied by renters. The homeowner vacancy rate was 0.7%; the rental vacancy rate was 4.0%. 4,205 people (76.9% of the population) lived in owner-occupied housing units and 1,248 people (22.8%) lived in rental housing units.

== History ==
El Granada's unusual concentric-circular street layout was designed by the influential architect and city planner Daniel Burnham. Burnham's other works included overseeing the design for the 1893 Columbian Exposition in Chicago and designing the 1902 Flatiron Building in New York City. Burnham's plan was commissioned by the Ocean Shore Railroad, which developed El Granada as a seaside resort for visitors who would use the railroad to travel between San Francisco and El Granada. The city was originally named "Granada" after the city in Spain but the Post Office mistakenly recorded the name as "El Granada" in 1909. Financial difficulties and the advent of the automobile caused the railroad to abandon the plan, and El Granada subsequently became a residential community.

== Government ==
In the California State Legislature, El Granada is in the 13th senatorial district, represented by Democrat Josh Becker, and in the 23rd Assembly district, represented by Democrat Marc Berman.

Federally, El Granada is in California's 16th congressional district, represented by Democrat Sam Liccardo.

== Transportation ==
Primary road access is via State Route 1 (the Cabrillo Highway) from the north and south.

SamTrans route 117 provides service to El Granada with service from Linda Mar in Pacifica to Half Moon Bay.
