= Tunitas, California =

- Ghost town
- Location within the state of California
- Coordinates: 37°22′59″N 122°23′57″W
- Country: United States
- State: California
- County: San Mateo
- Time zone: UTC-8 (Pacific (PST))
  - Summer (DST): UTC-7 (PDT)

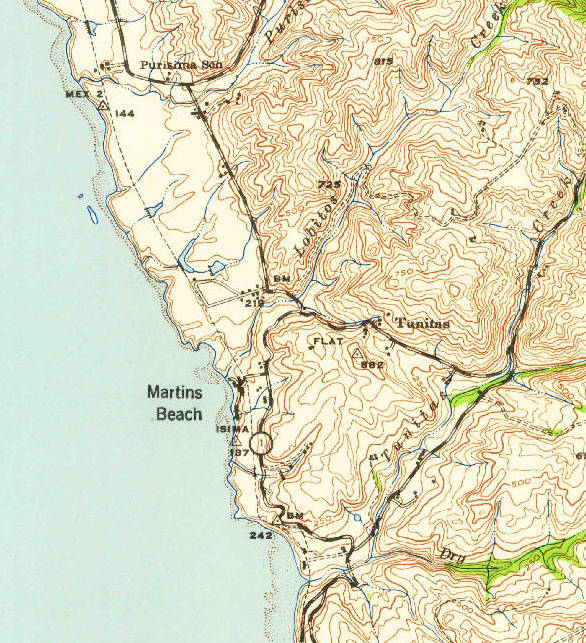
Tunitas on 1940 USGS topo map

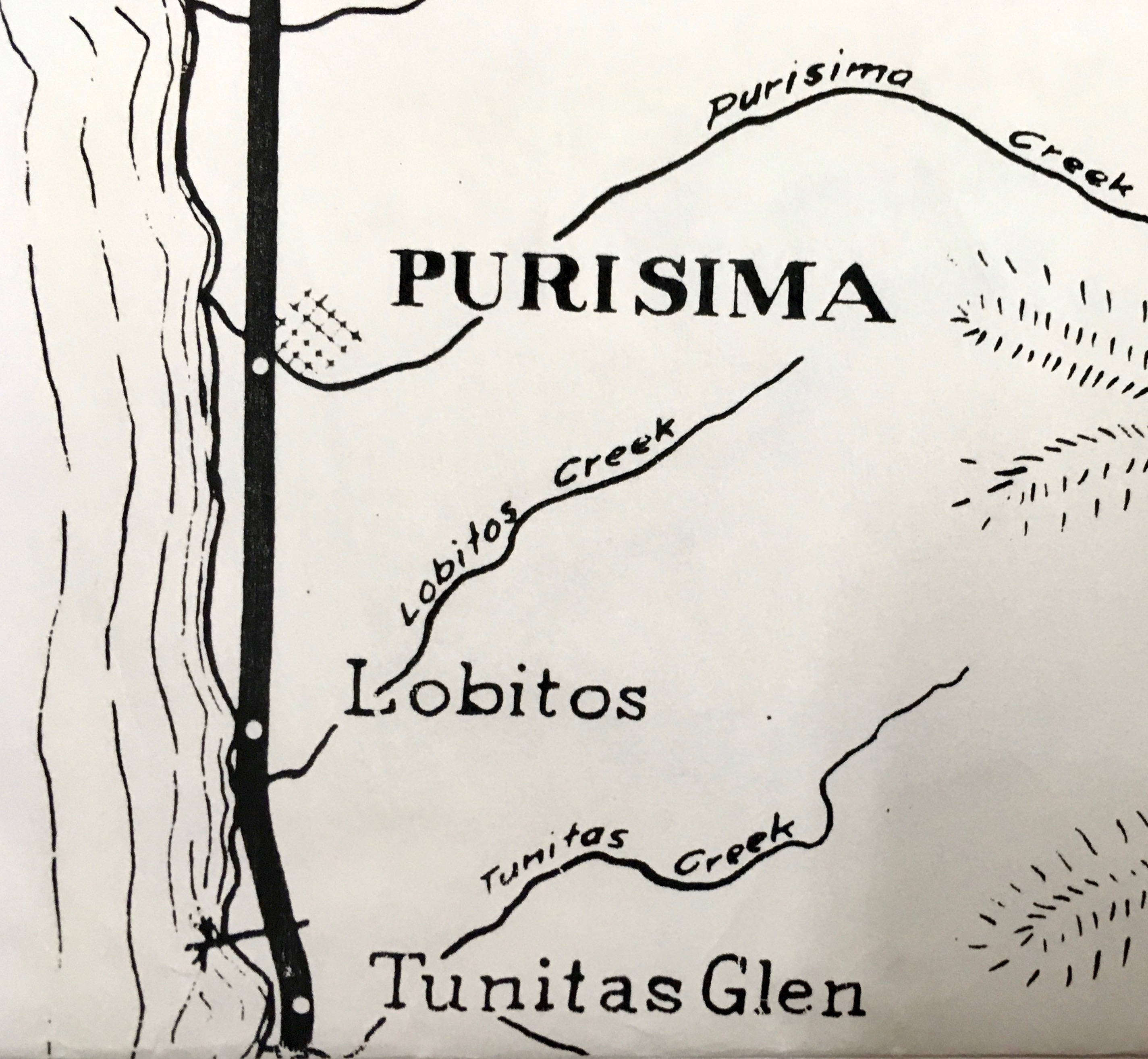
Early planning of stops on the Ocean Shore Railroad included a station or flag stop at Lobitos near Tunitas.

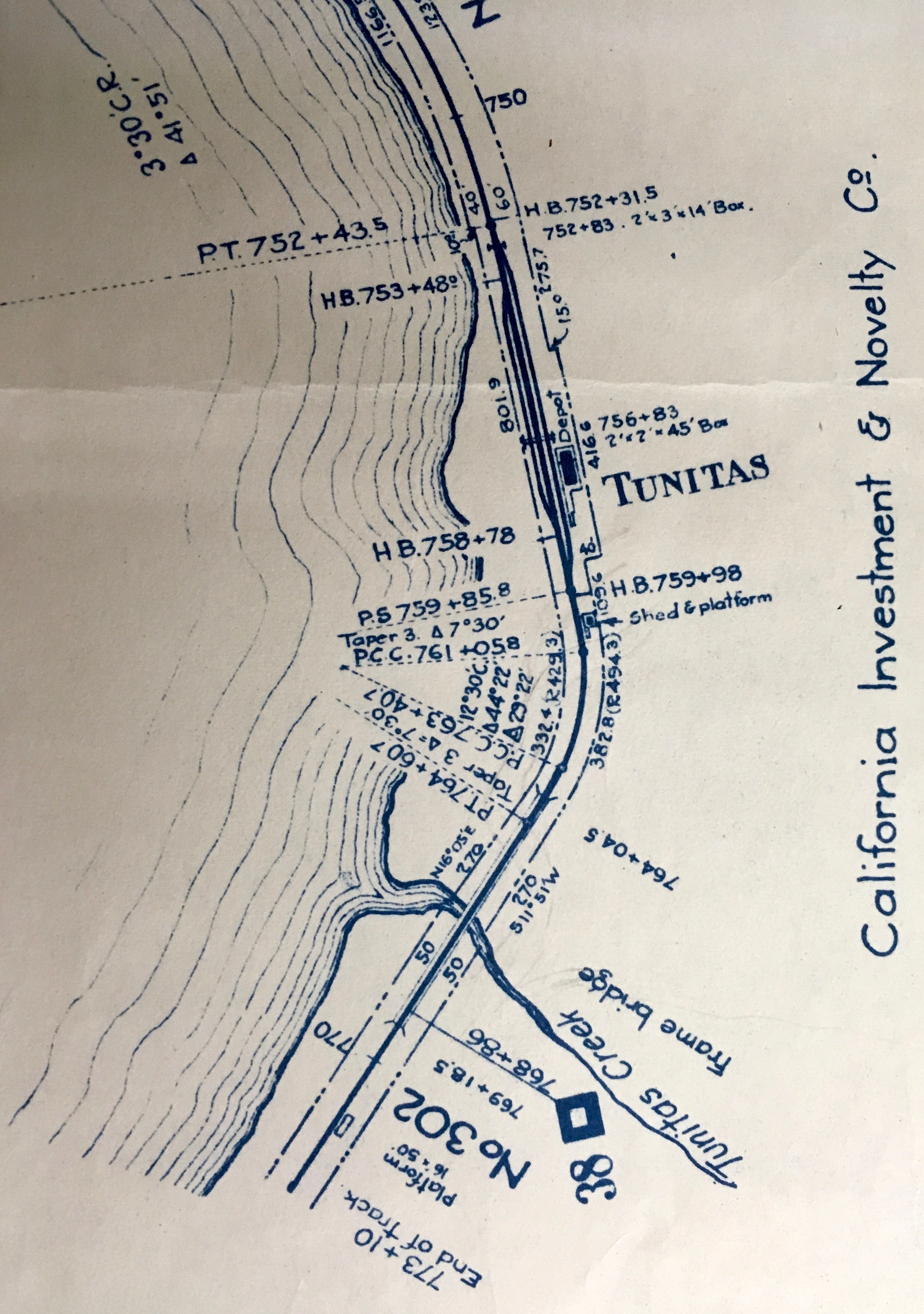
Tunitas station was on Tunitas Creek, south of the settlement.

Tunitas was a small unincorporated community in San Mateo County, California, United States. It was originally located on State Route 1 until that state route was moved to the west. It was also renamed Lobitos.

Arroyo de las Tunitas is shown on the diseños, circa 1839, of the San Gregorio and Canada Verde grants. The name means “A small bush…grows super-abundant at and near its mouth, and its fruit is known to the present generation as sea apples.”
