= Community United Methodist Church =

Community United Methodist Church may refer to:

- Community United Methodist Church (Half Moon Bay, California)
- Community United Methodist Church of Pacific Palisades
- First Methodist Episcopal Church and Parsonage (Williams, Arizona)
