= Purissima, California =

- Ghost town
- Location within the state of California Purissima, California (the United States)
- Coordinates: 37°24′11″N 122°25′1″W
- Country: United States
- State: California
- County: San Mateo
- Time zone: UTC-8 (Pacific (PST))
  - Summer (DST): UTC-7 (PDT)

Purissima is a ghost town in southwestern San Mateo County, California, United States, near the junction of State Route 1 and Verde Road. Purísima means "purest" in Spanish and is most commonly used in Spanish to refer to La Purísima Concepción (the Immaculate Conception) of the Virgin Mary (note historical misspelling in English resulting in double "s", or the result of the Holstein pronunciation with use of the "ẝ" being mistaken as ß "ss", or perhaps spelling comes from the local Portuguese influence, where the spelling from A Puríssima Conceição would be correct). Purissima is the name of the town used as the setting for Ross Macdonald's 1958 crime fiction novel 'The Doomsters'.

== History ==
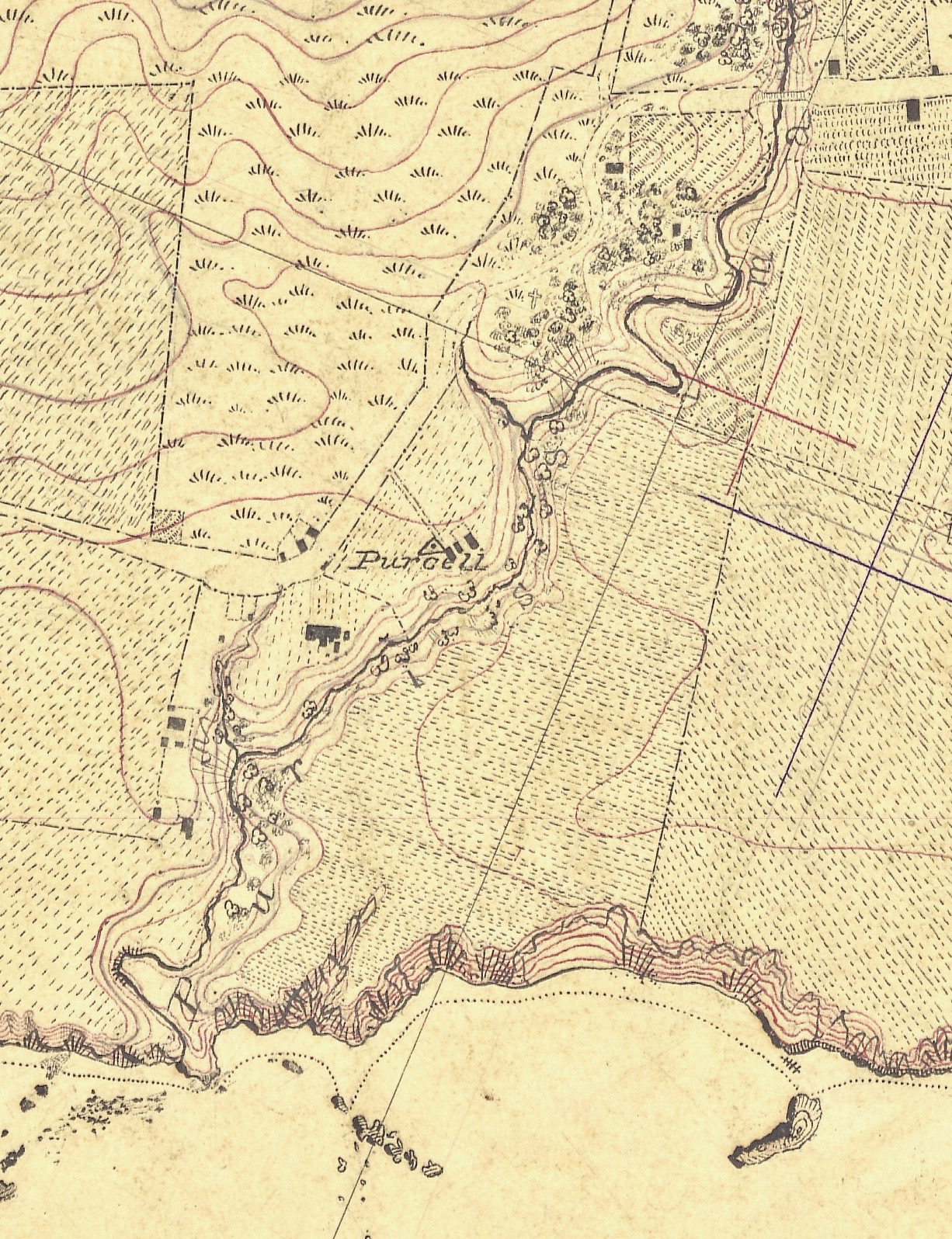
Map of the town in 1866 showing buildings, road and cemetery.

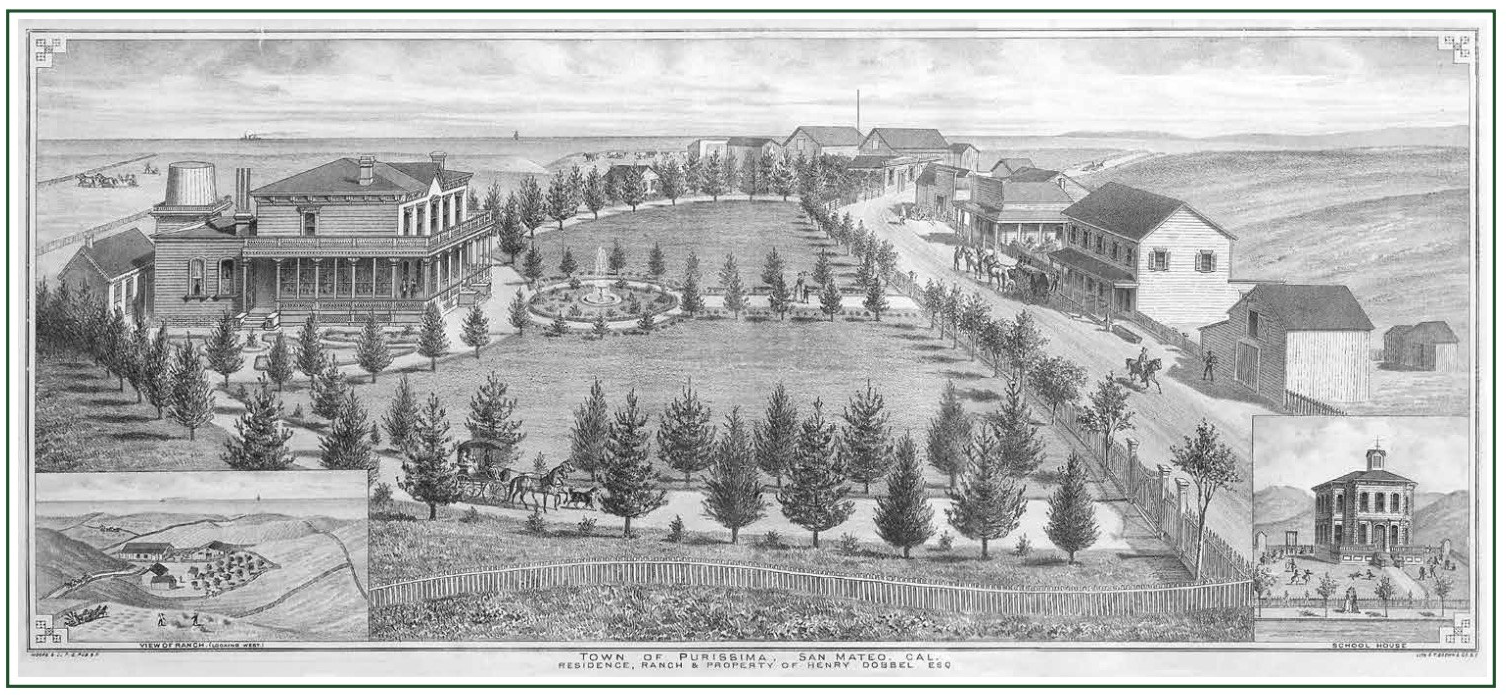
Town of Purissima

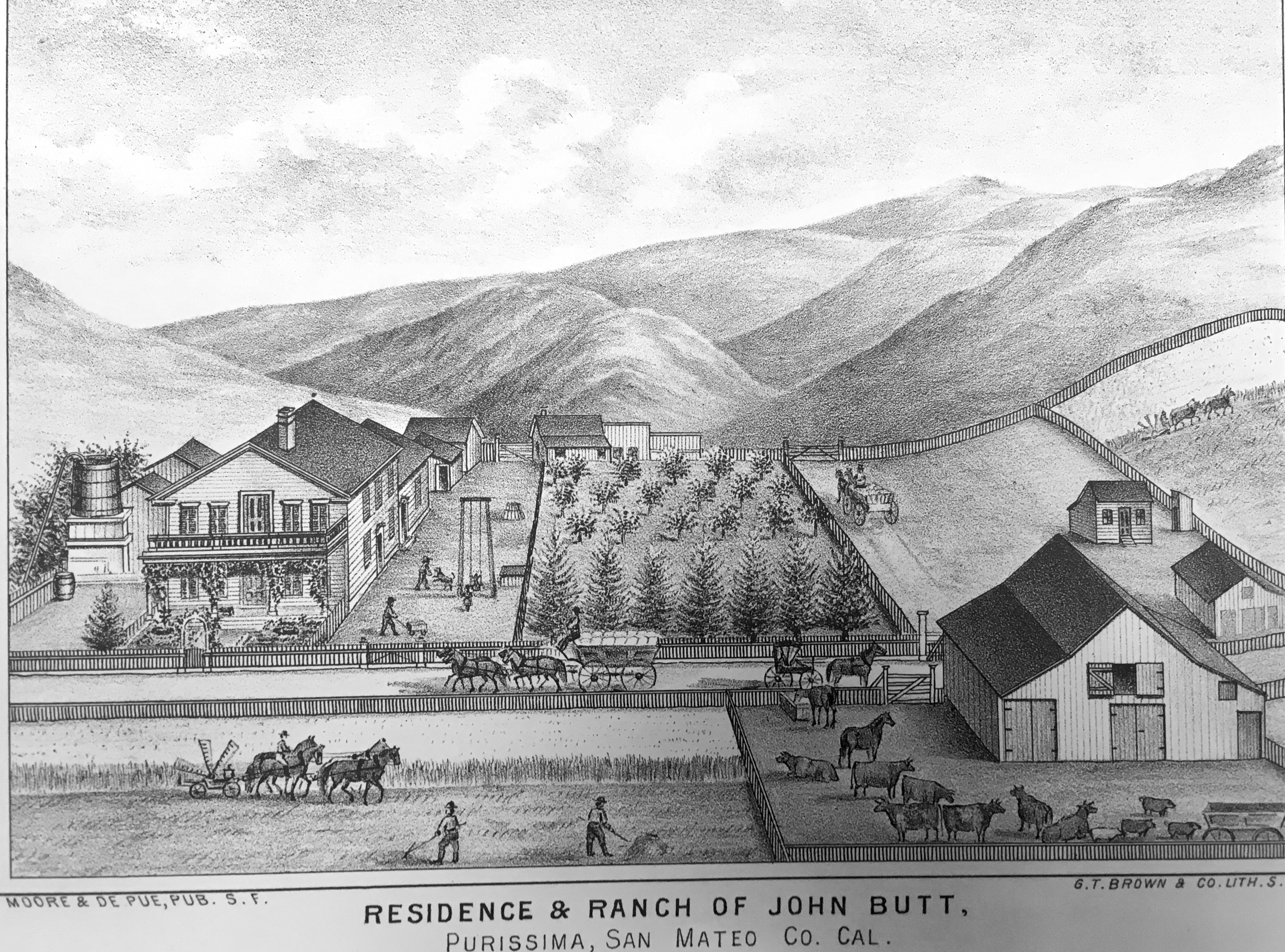
Residence and ranch of John Butt in 1877

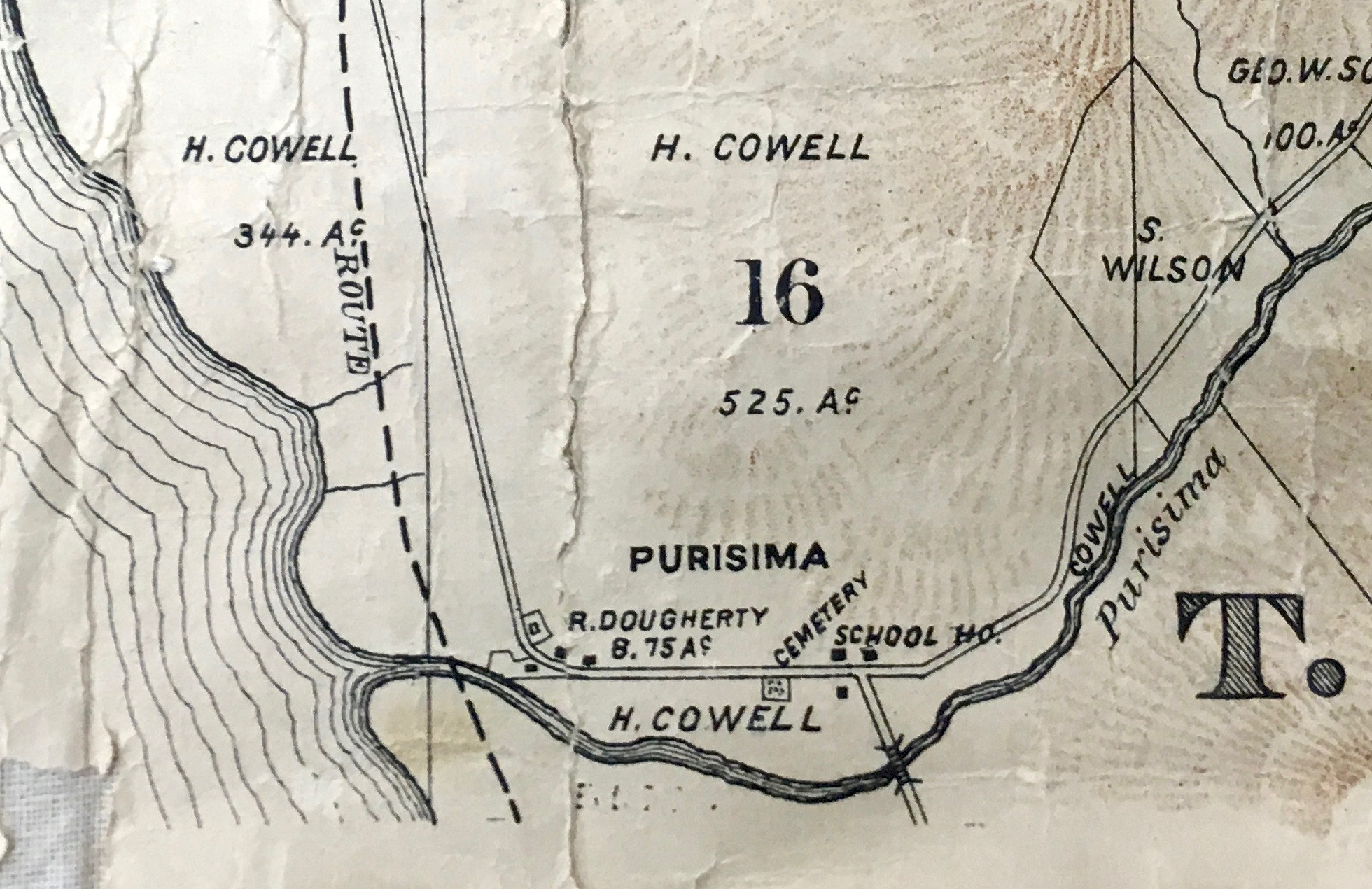
Detail from 1894 parcel map with single 's'

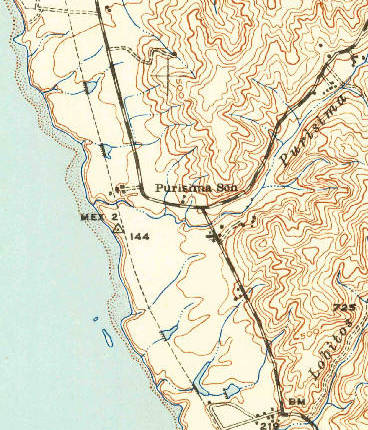
The town of Purisima was gone in 1940 but the school was still there

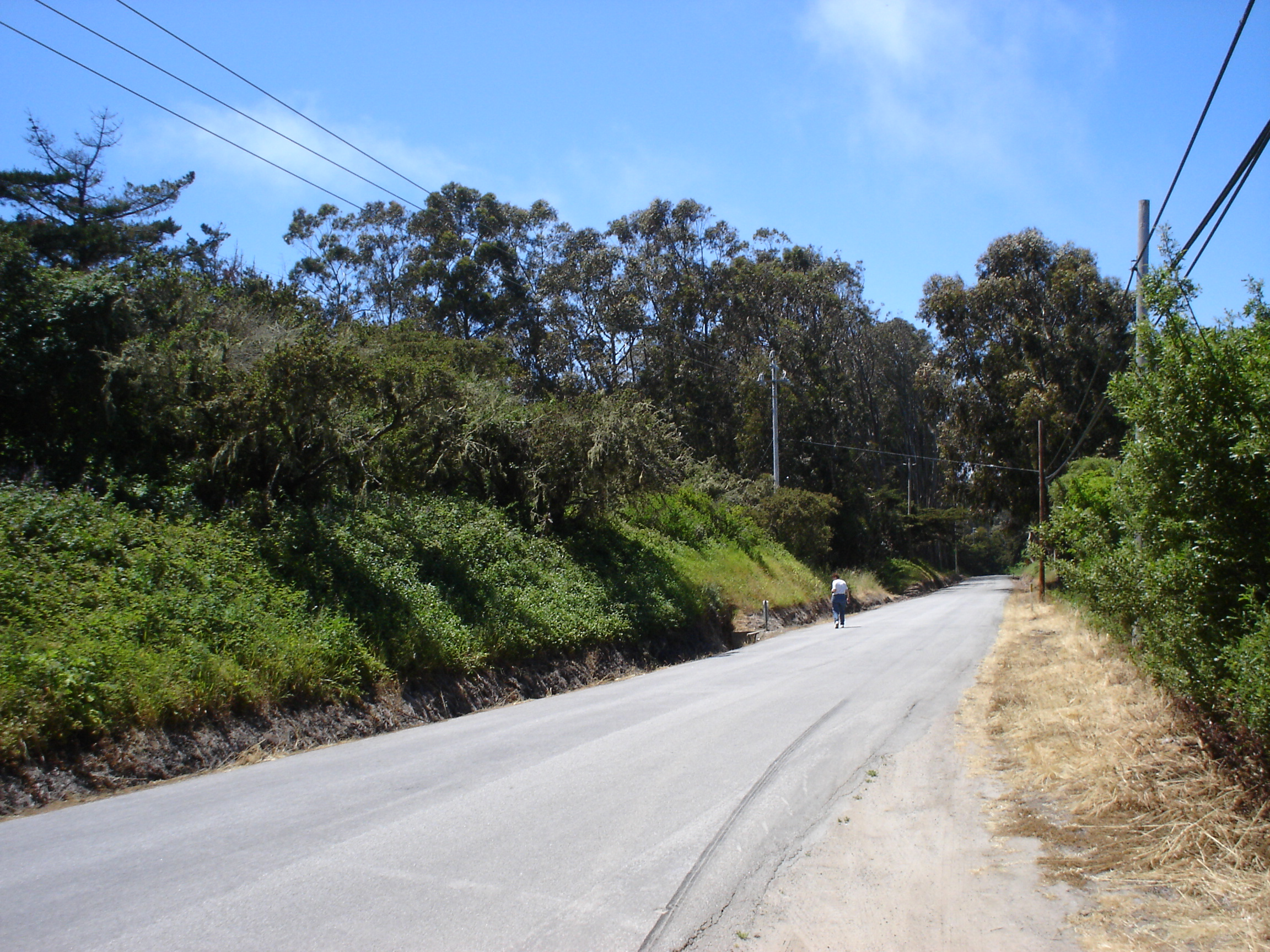
Site of Purissima from Verde Road near Highway 1, May 2008

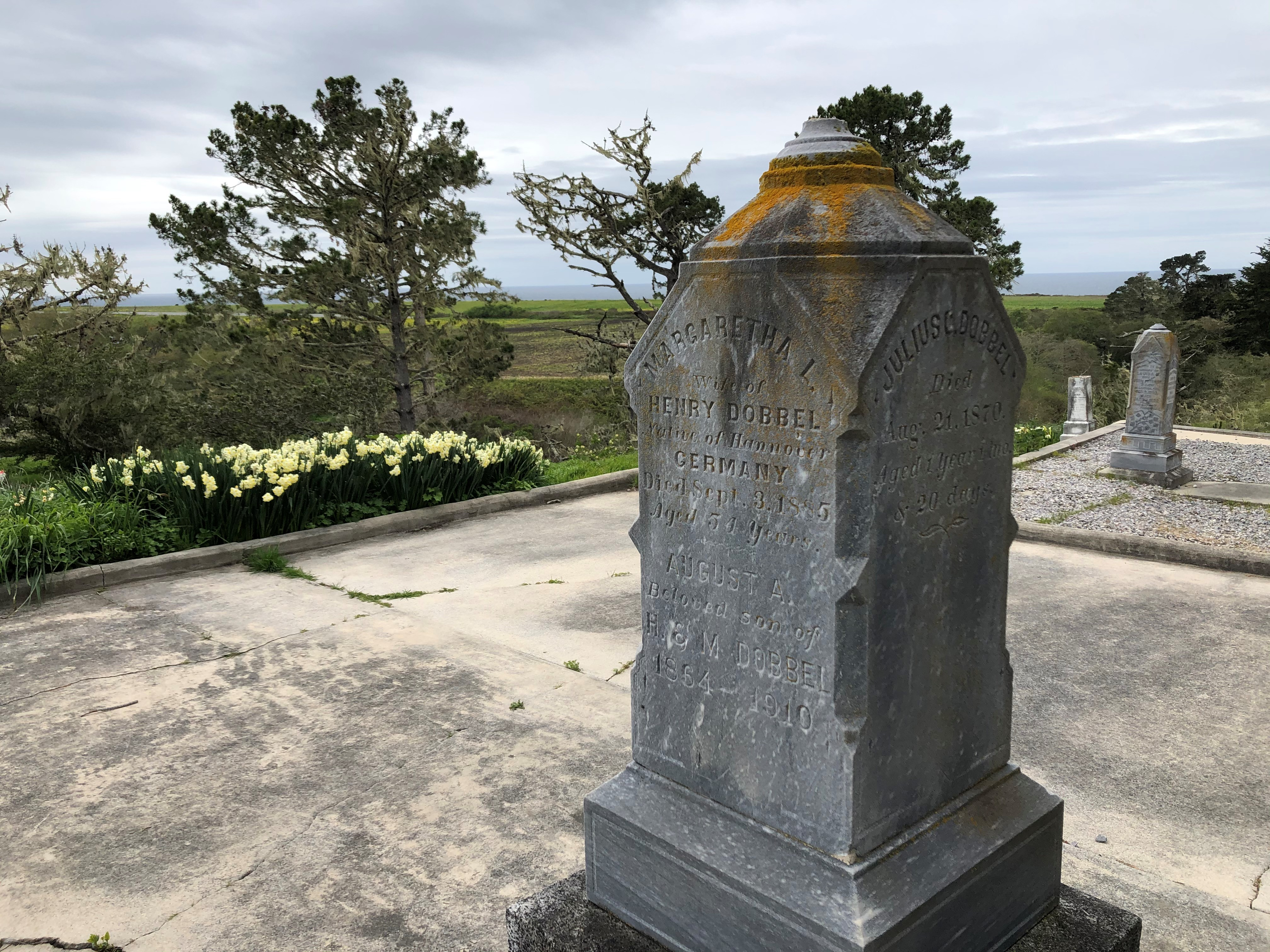
Dobbel Family tombstone - Purissima cemetery

Located on José María Alviso's Rancho Cañada de Verde y Arroyo de la Purisima in a rural area four miles (6 km) south of Half Moon Bay, the village was one of the earliest settlements on the San Mateo County coast. The first European mention of the area was noted by Juan Crespí on the Portolá expedition of 1769. On October 27 they stopped at an abandoned Torose village at the northern side of the stream. The local guides told them they have moved into the mountains. Crespí christened the stream San Ivo (Saint Ives). This is now remembered as California Historical Landmark #22. The first American village, as well as the creek, was renamed Purisima in 1786.

The town was founded in an agricultural area in the early 1850s. Henry Dobbel (born in the sovereign state of Holstein, then in a personal union with Denmark, on July 1, 1829; died in Purissima on December 22, 1891) came to California via Cape Horn in 1845. After working at odd jobs, and even running a San Francisco restaurant, Dobbel married German Margaret Roverkamf-Schroeder (born near Hanover, Kingdom of Hanover, in 1831; died in Purissima on September 3, 1885). She had come to California via the Isthmus of Panama. They bought a farm in the East Bay. In the 1860s, they sold their farm and bought 1,000 acres (4.0 km^{2}) from John Purcell. They built a big, ornate house on the south bank of Purisima Creek. The house had two stories and 17 rooms; it boasted such innovations as gas lighting and running water. Dobbel employed 50 men who planted and harvested wheat, barley, and potatoes.

The community was badly flooded by Purisima Creek in January 1862, the same month that much of northern California experienced its worst floods in history. Some fields and buildings were swept away. By the early 1870s, Purissima had a post office, several stores, a school, a one-story hotel known as Purissima House (owned by Richard Dougherty), and other buildings. The general store was built by Henry Husing. A lumber mill was constructed at the mouth of Purissima Canyon, to take advantage of the extensive redwood logging in the nearby Santa Cruz Mountains.

Oil was discovered near the village in the 1880s on George Shout's land. However, hopes of an oil boom were dashed when only 20 barrels a day were produced. The U.S. Geological Survey has noted later efforts to drill for oil in the area, usually resulting in minor production.

Henry Dobbel bought the general store, only to encounter financial difficulties when he extended credit to many of his customers. Then there were a series of crop failures, which eventually impacted Dobbel and the entire community. Henry Dobbel went bankrupt and sold his estate in 1890 to Henry Cowell. He remained in the area, however, and both he and his wife are buried in the village cemetery.

The Ocean Shore Railroad, which operated from San Francisco to Tunitas Creek from 1907 to 1920, included a stop at Purissima, as noted on a U.S. Geological Survey's Santa Cruz quadrangle map.

The Purissima Post Office opened in 1868, only to be discontinued in 1869. Then, in 1872, it reopened and continued to serve the community until 1901.

Some buildings still remained as late as the 1930s, but the town was largely abandoned before World War II. The 1940 U.S. Geological Survey map shows a few buildings and notes the "Purisima School." The 1943 map still shows the school. At that time, State Route 1 still passed directly through Purissima. Today, Highway 1 runs farther west of the original route. Verde Road runs north from Lobitos to Purisima Creek Road; this is actually the original alignment of Highway 1. According to the older maps, the school was located on the north side of what is now Verde Road, just east of Highway 1. The cemetery is in the woods bordered by Verde Road and Highway 1.

In 1939, the Federal Writers' Project guidebook for California noted, "The village of Purisima, once a lively town on Jose Maria Alivso's Rancho Canada y Arroyo de la Purisima, is ghostly and deserted now. Its weathered gray buildings stand among mosshung cypresses and eucalyptus trees, their windows broken, their stairs falling in, their facades rudely stuck with gay circus posters."

No clear reasons have been found for the demise of the community; presumably its remote location led some residents to move to Half Moon Bay or other communities. All that remains of Purissima today is the cemetery (still noted on U.S. Geological Survey maps) and a part of the school. Several farms surround the site. There are numerous evergreen trees and heavy vegetation at the site. Dayna Chalif, who has explored the Purissima Cemetery and researched historic archives, wrote, "Purissima was supposed to be the big town on the coast, [but it] was harder to get to." The failure of the Ocean Shore Railroad, which was intended to provide better access to the San Mateo County coast, may have hurt Purissima, although the village was later included on the original routing of Highway 1.

Until the 1950s, however, much of the San Mateo County coastal area remained sparsely settled and the few surviving communities were relatively small. With the dramatic rise of housing costs along San Francisco Bay, there has been greater incentive to build along the Pacific Ocean, resulting in the steady growth of Montara, Moss Beach, El Granada, Half Moon Bay, and Pescadero. This has done little for Purissima, which had long since vanished. Local newspaper articles have frequently mentioned that limited access to the area, primarily via Highways 1 and 92, has been a major factor in the slow growth. With the completion of the Devil's Slide tunnel on Highway 1 in 2012, access to the coastal communities south of San Francisco improved.

In 2017, some restoration was begun of the site, with emphasis on cleaning up the cemetery, including access trails. Very little remains of the village besides the cemetery.

== Purisima Creek ==
There is also the same named Purisima Creek, which passes near the town site. Purisima Creek Road follows the creek for some distance, toward the Santa Cruz Mountains to the east. There are some seasonal, sometimes spectacular falls along the creek. The creek was subsequently named Arroyo de la Purissima by later Spanish explorers.

== Cemetery ==
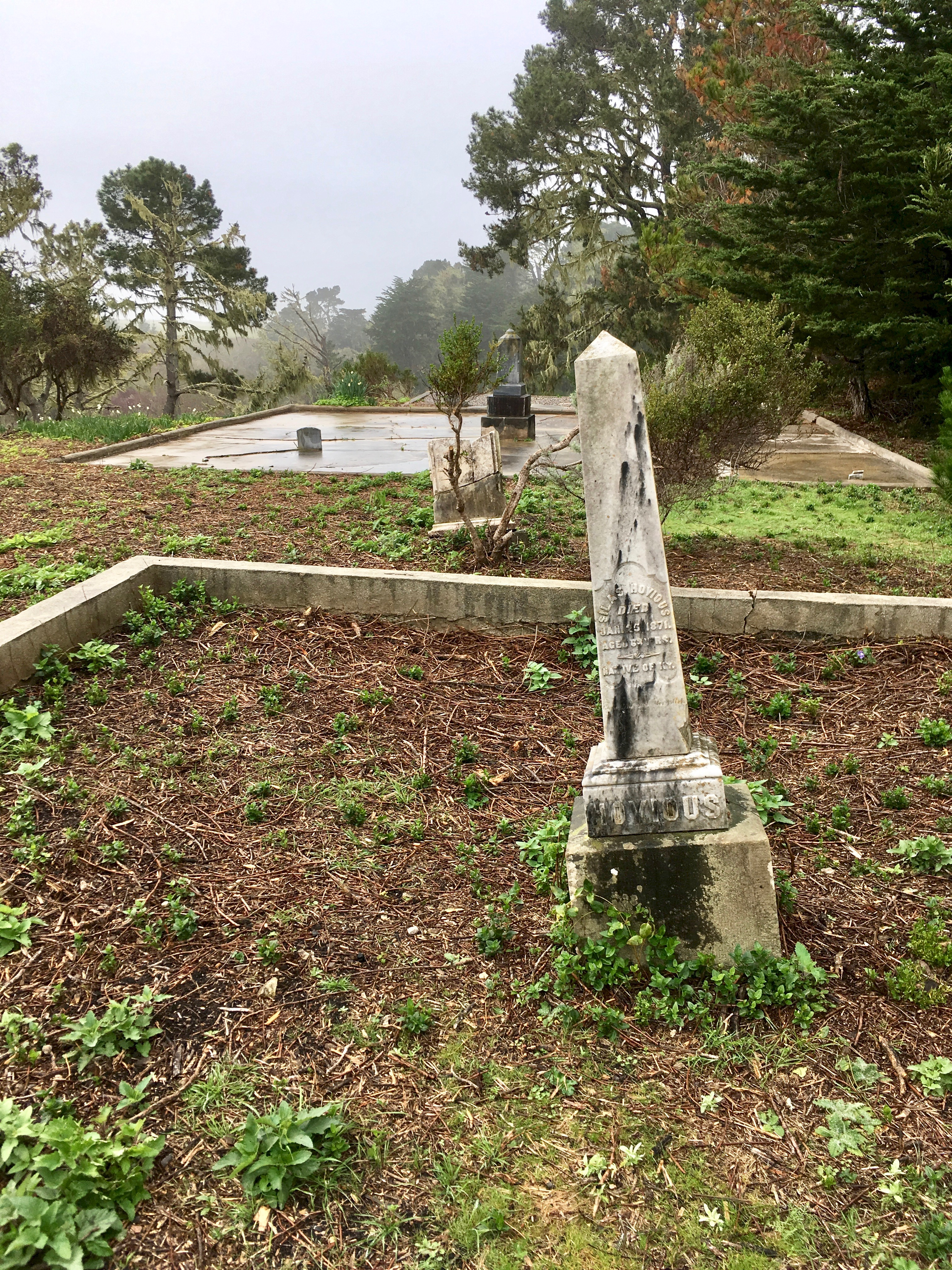
Old family plots of the ghost town

On September 15, 1868, John Purcell deeded some of his property to the citizens of Purissima for a burial ground. The Purissima Cemetery Association was created. Free burials were to be provided to Purissima residents. A Protestant church was to be built next to the cemetery.

Today, many of the gravestones in this cemetery are missing or broken. In the summer of 2005, Dayna Chalif transcribed the existing gravestones in the Purissima Cemetery, which was long largely overgrown with weeds, vines, and poison oak, making it very difficult to access. In 2017, a local company cleared a path and advertises natural burial services on the site.

== See also ==
List of ghost towns in California
