= Rancho Cañada de Verde y Arroyo de la Purisima =

Mexican land grant in California

Coordinates: 37.400°N 122.380°W

Rancho Cañada de Verde y Arroyo de la Purísima was a 8,906-acre (36.04 km^{2}) Mexican land grant in present-day San Mateo County, California given in 1838 by Governor Juan B. Alvarado to José María Alviso. The name roughly translates to ranch of the green glen and brook of the Purest ('the Purest' is a reference to Mary, mother of Jesus). The grant extended along the Pacific coast from Purisima Creek south to Tunitas Creek and encompasses present-day Lobitos and the ghost town Purissima.

== History ==
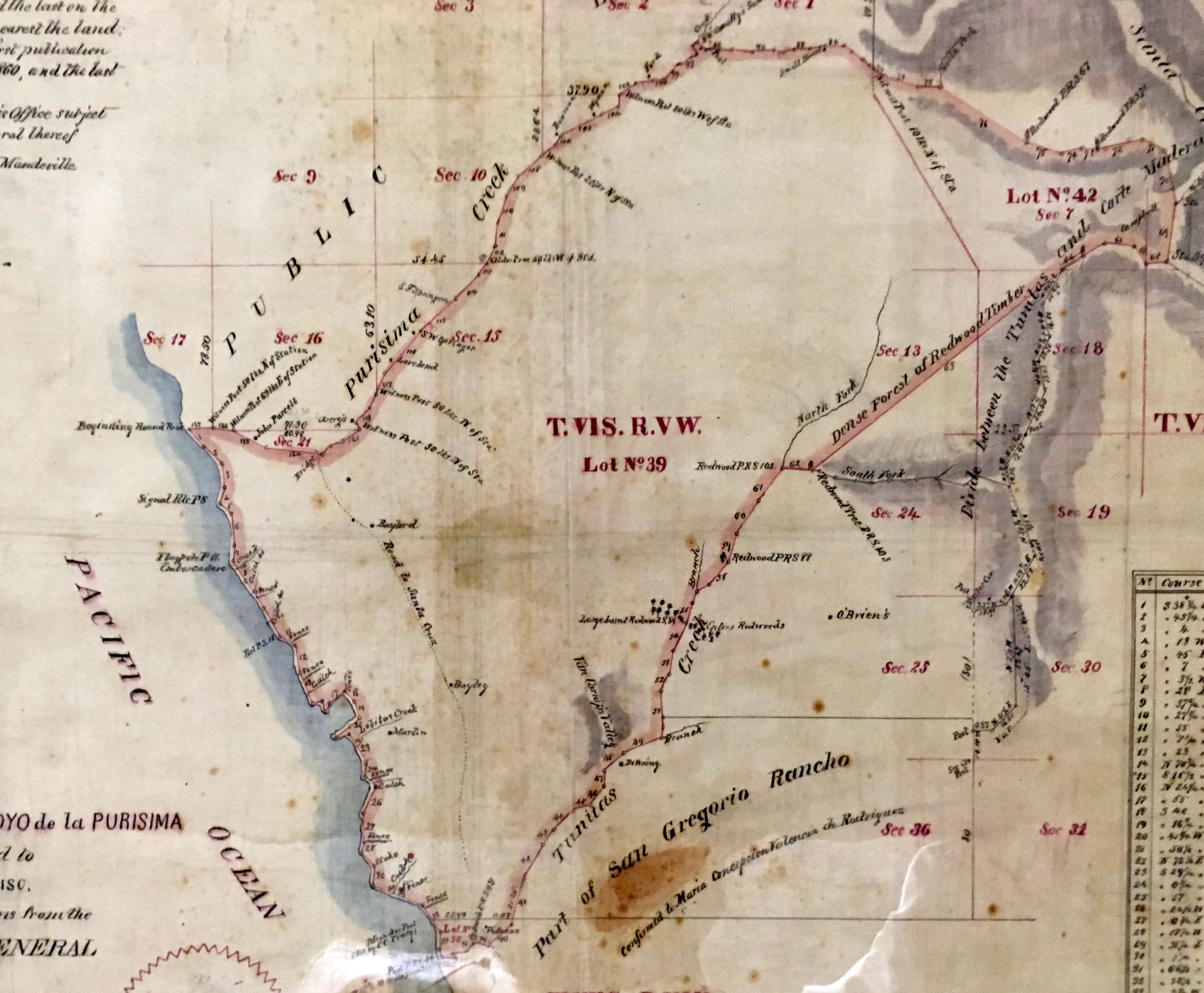
Detail from the confirmed plat map

José María Alviso, a military officer of San Jose, petitioned for the two square league grant for his brother José Antonio Alviso. José Antonio Alviso (1796–1880), eldest son of Josè Ygnacio Alviso and Margarita Bernal, José Antonio Alviso married Maria Antonia de Jesus Pacheco (1796–1852) in 1816.

With the cession of California to the United States following the Mexican-American War, the 1848 Treaty of Guadalupe Hidalgo provided that the land grants would be honored. As required by the Land Act of 1851, a claim for Rancho Cañada de Verde y Arroyo de la Purísima was filed by José Antonio Alviso with the Public Land Commission in 1852. An appeal by the US was rejected by the US Supreme Court, and the grant was patented to José Antonio Alviso in 1865.
