= Rings Gulch =

Valley in California, United States of America

Coordinates: 37.388830°N 122.371362°W

- Region: San Mateo County, California
- Natural resources: stream which is a tributary of Tunitas Creek

Rings Gulch is a valley in San Mateo County, California. It contains a stream which is a tributary of Tunitas Creek.

== See also ==
- List of watercourses in the San Francisco Bay Area
