= East Fork Tunitas Creek =

River in California, United States

Coordinates: 37.377442°N 122.374695°W

East Fork Tunitas Creek is a small river in San Mateo County, California and is a tributary of Tunitas Creek.

The Tunitas Creek Association (TCA) is a conservation organization was founded in 2004. The current secretary, Pliny Keep, lives on the East Fork of Tunitas Creek. Tunitas Creek was last surveyed by the California Department of Fish and Game in 1967 and found to contain wild steelhead trout. We have seen smolts every year in the main fork, but the East Fork goes underground in sections during dry years.

== See also ==
- List of watercourses in the San Francisco Bay Area
