= USS DeLong (DD-129) =

Wickes-class destroyer

Coordinates: 38.0888°N 122.2575°W

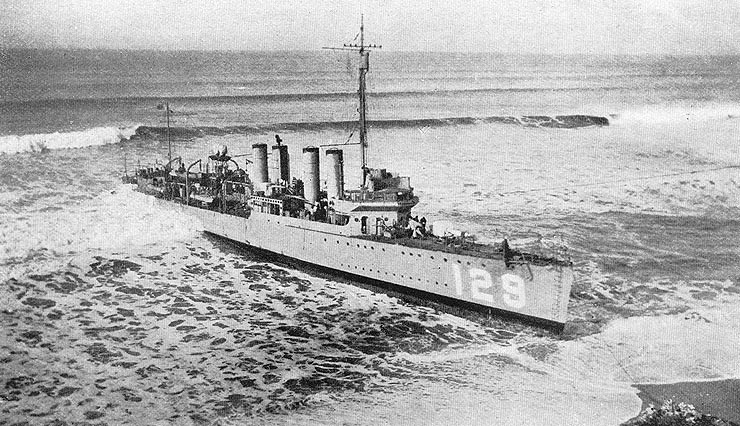
- DeLong aground at Half Moon Bay, December 1921

History

United States
- Namesake: George W. DeLong
- Builder: New York Shipbuilding Corporation, Camden, New Jersey
- Laid down: 21 February 1918
- Launched: 29 October 1918
- Commissioned: 20 September 1919
- Decommissioned: 18 March 1922
- Fate: Sold 25 September 1922

General characteristics
- Class & type: Wickes-class destroyer
- Displacement: 1,202–1,208 long tons (1,221–1,227 t) (standard); 1,295–1,322 long tons (1,316–1,343 t) (deep load)
- Length: 314 ft 4 in (95.8 m)
- Beam: 30 ft 11 in (9.42 m)
- Draught: 9 ft 10 in (3.0 m)
- Installed power: 27,000 shp (20,000 kW); 4 water-tube boilers
- Propulsion: 2 shafts, 2 steam turbines
- Speed: 35 knots (65 km/h; 40 mph) (design)
- Range: 2,500 nautical miles (4,600 km; 2,900 mi) at 20 knots (37 km/h; 23 mph) (design)
- Complement: 6 officers, 108 enlisted men
- Armament: 4 × single 4-inch (102 mm) guns; 2 × single 1-pounder AA guns; 4 × triple 21 inch (533 mm) torpedo tubes; 2 × depth charge rails

USS DeLong (DD-129) was a Wickes-class destroyer built for the United States Navy during World War I.

== Description ==
The Wickes class was an improved and faster version of the preceding Caldwell-class. Two different designs were prepared to the same specification that mainly differed in the turbines and boilers used. The ships built to the Bethlehem Steel design, built in the Fore River and Union Iron Works shipyards, mostly used Yarrow boilers that deteriorated badly during service and were mostly scrapped during the 1930s. The ships displaced 1,202–1,208 long tons (1,221–1,227 t) at standard load and 1,295–1,322 long tons (1,316–1,343 t) at deep load. They had an overall length of 314 feet 4 inches (95.8 m), a beam of 30 feet 11 inches (9.4 m) and a draught of 9 feet 10 inches (3.0 m). They had a crew of 6 officers and 108 enlisted men.

Performance differed radically between the ships of the class, often due to poor workmanship. The Wickes class was powered by two steam turbines, each driving one propeller shaft, using steam provided by four water-tube boilers. The turbines were designed to produce a total of 27,000 shaft horsepower (20,000 kW) intended to reach a speed of 35 knots (65 km/h; 40 mph). The ships carried 225 long tons (229 t) of fuel oil which was intended gave them a range of 2,500 nautical miles (4,600 km; 2,900 mi) at 20 knots (37 km/h; 23 mph).

The ships were armed with four 4-inch (102 mm) guns in single mounts and were fitted with two 1-pounder guns for anti-aircraft defense. Their primary weapon, though, was their torpedo battery of a dozen 21 inch (533 mm) torpedo tubes in four triple mounts. In many ships a shortage of 1-pounders caused them to be replaced by 3-inch (76 mm) anti-aircraft (AA) guns. They also carried a pair of depth charge rails. A "Y-gun" depth charge thrower was added to many ships.

== Construction and career ==
DeLong, named for Lieutenant Commander George W. DeLong (1844–1881), an Arctic explorer, was launched 29 October 1918 by New York Shipbuilding Corporation, Camden, New Jersey; sponsored by Miss E. DeL. Mills, granddaughter of Lt. Cmdr. DeLong; and commissioned 20 September 1919. DeLong sailed from New York 3 November 1919, and after joining in exercises at Guantanamo Bay, and patrolling off Honduras arrived at San Diego 24 December. She sailed in maneuvers and torpedo practice off Coronado Roads until placed in reserve 20 June 1920. After extended overhaul at Mare Island Navy Yard, she returned to San Diego 26 June 1921 and began operating from that port 21 October with 50 percent of her complement. On 1 December 1921 she went aground in a heavy fog at Half Moon Bay. A tug and two destroyers, Badger (DD-126) and Ballard (DD-267), stood by to assist. On 17 December she was salvaged and towed to Mare Island Navy Yard. DeLong was decommissioned 18 March 1922 and her hulk sold 25 September 1922.
