= Mitchell Creek (Tunitas Creek tributary) =

River in the United States of America

Coordinates: 37.408552°N 122.350805°W

Mitchell Creek is a small river in San Mateo County, California, and is a tributary of Tunitas Creek.

== See also ==
- List of watercourses in the San Francisco Bay Area
