= Lobitos, California =

Unincorporated community in California, United States

- Populated place
- Location within the state of California Lobitos, California (the United States)
- Coordinates: 37°22′59″N 122°23′57″W
- Country: United States
- State: California
- County: San Mateo
- Elevation: 165 ft (50 m)
- Time zone: UTC-8 (Pacific (PST))
  - Summer (DST): UTC-7 (PDT)

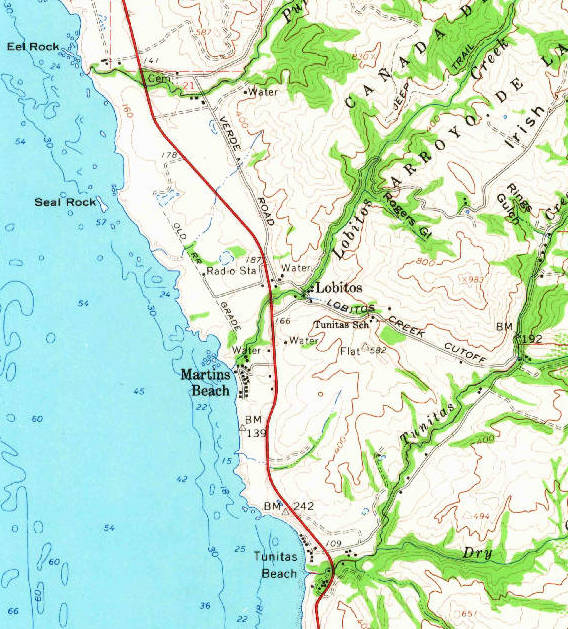
Lobitos as located on a 1961 USGS map

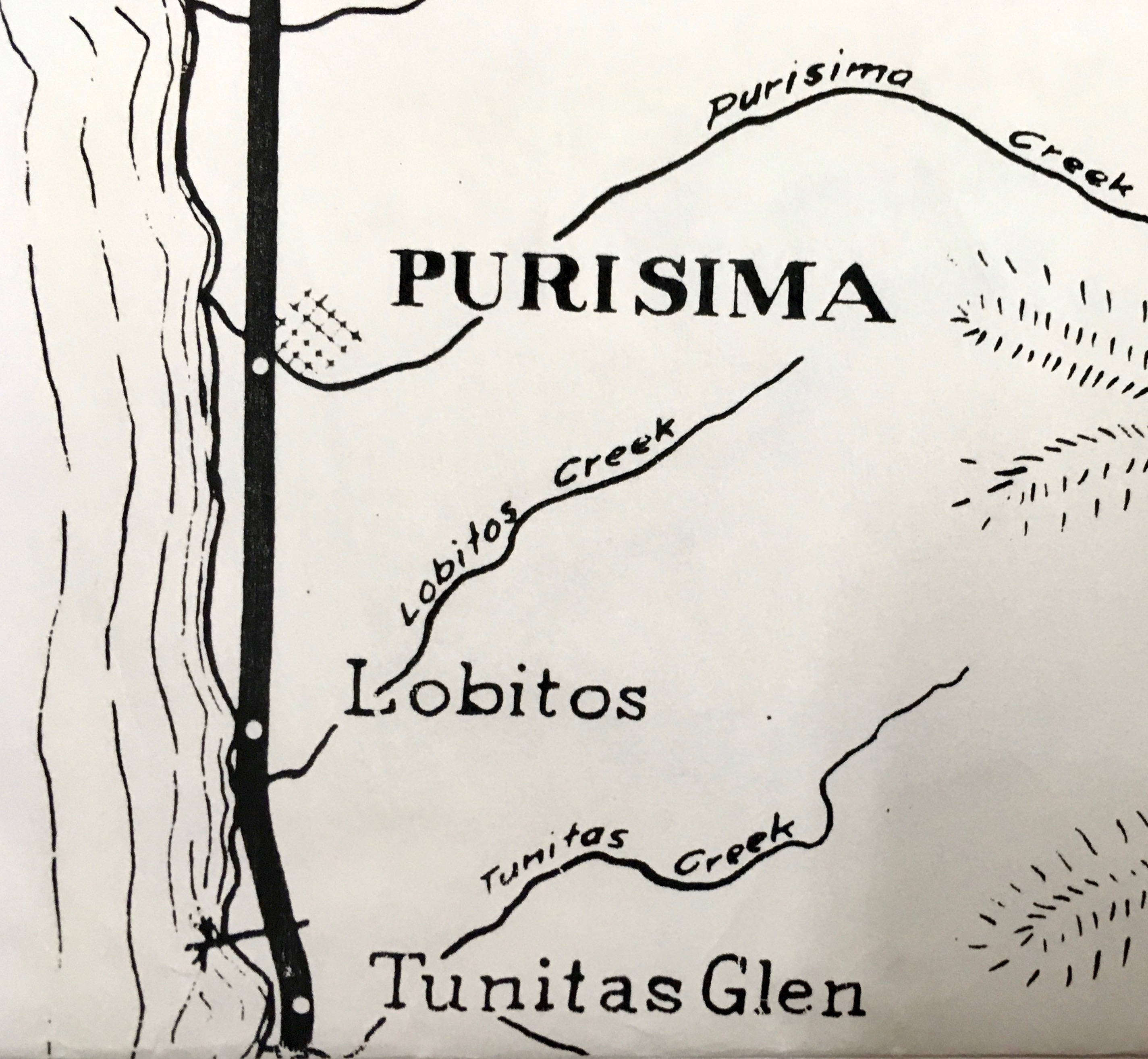
Early planning of rail stops included a station or flag stop at Lobitos near the Tunitas community

Lobitos (Spanish for "Little wolves") is a populated place in San Mateo County, just east of State Route 1 and south of Half Moon Bay and the ghost town of Purissima. It is 165 feet (50.3 m) above sea level.

== Name ==
Lobitos means 'little wolves', a nickname for 'otters' in Spanish. It was originally named "Tunitas".

== History ==
The Ocean Shore Railroad, which operated between San Francisco and Tunitas Creek from 1907 to 1920, passed near the village. There was apparently no station in Lobitos. Highway 1 originally passed through Lobitos; it was later rerouted to the west of the village, closely following the old railroad route.

Today, the portion of the former state highway through Lobitos has become Verde Road. The Lobitos Creek Cut-Off connects the village with Tunitas Creek Road, which runs between Highway 1 and State Route 35 (Skyline Boulevard).
