= Dry Creek (San Mateo County, California) =

River in California, United States

Coordinates: 37.3588312°N 122.3916405°W

Dry Creek is a small river in San Mateo County, California and is a tributary of Tunitas Creek.

== See also ==
- List of watercourses in the San Francisco Bay Area
