= Half Moon Bay, California =

City in California, United States

- City
- City of Half Moon Bay
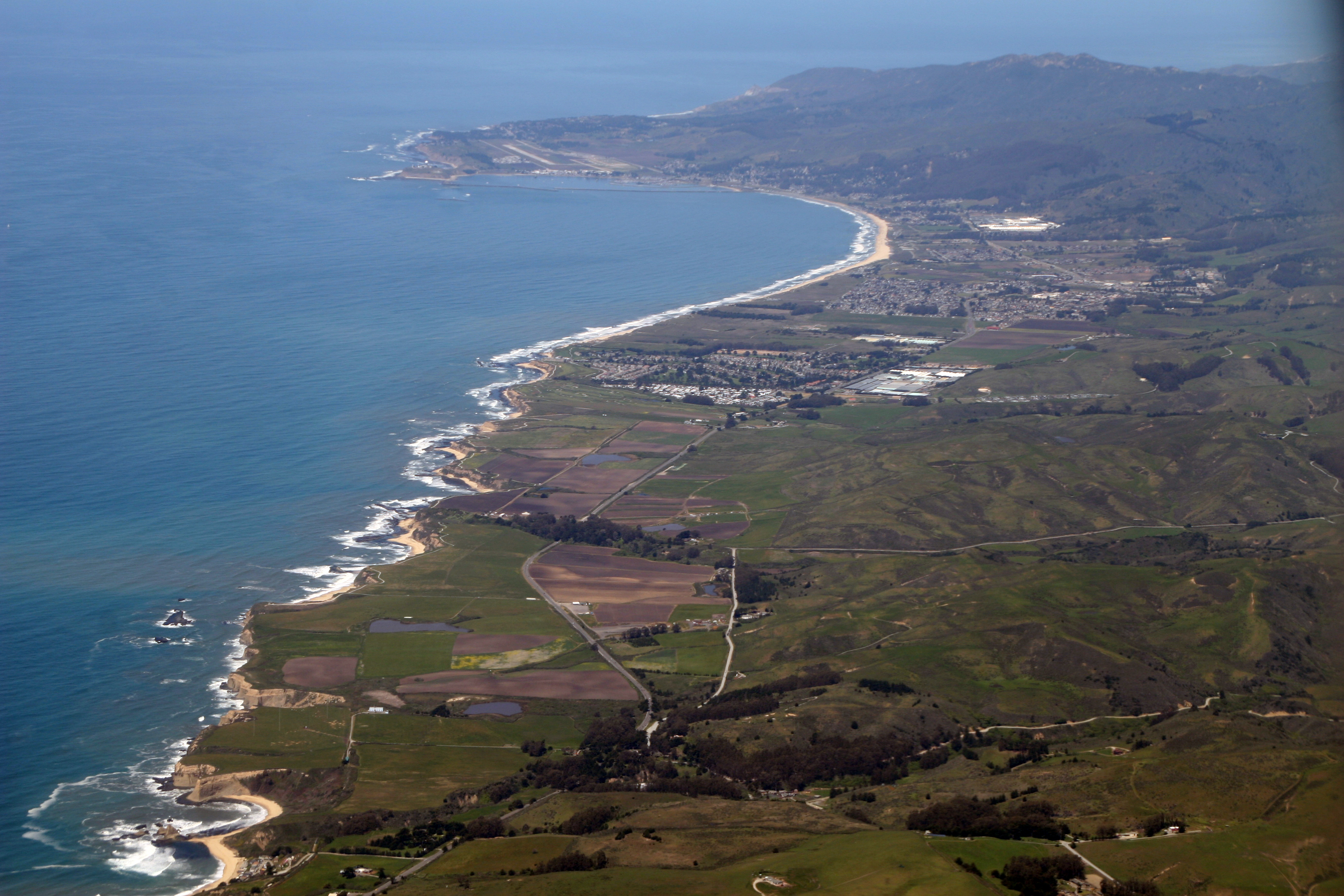
- Aerial view of Half Moon Bay facing north

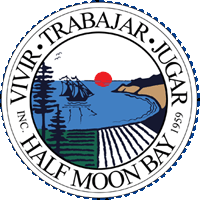
- Seal
- Nickname: "Home of the world-famous Half Moon Bay Pumpkin Festival!"
- Motto(s): Vivir, Trabajar, Jugar (Live, Work, Play)
- Interactive map of Half Moon Bay, California
- Location in the United States
- Coordinates: 37°27′32″N 122°26′13″W
- Country: United States
- State: California
- County: San Mateo
- Incorporated: July 15, 1959

Government
  - Mayor: Robert Brownstone
  - City Manager: Matthew Chidester

Area
  - Total: 6.25 sq mi (16.20 km^{2})
  - Land: 6.24 sq mi (16.17 km^{2})
  - Water: 0.012 sq mi (0.03 km^{2}) 0.17%
- Elevation: 75 ft (23 m)

Population (2020)
  - Total: 11,795
  - Density: 1,889/sq mi (729.4/km^{2})
- Time zone: UTC−8 (PST)
  - Summer (DST): UTC−7 (PDT)
- ZIP Code: 94019
- Area code: 650
- FIPS code: 06-31708
- GNIS feature IDs: 277528, 2410685
- Website: www.halfmoonbay.gov

Half Moon Bay is a coastal city in San Mateo County, California, United States, approximately 25 miles (40 kilometers) south of San Francisco. Its population was 11,795 as of the 2020 census. Immediately north of Half Moon Bay is Pillar Point Harbor and the unincorporated community of Princeton-by-the-Sea. Half Moon Bay is known for Mavericks, a big-wave surf location. It is called Half Moon Bay because of its crescent shape.

Originally an agricultural outpost to Mission San Francisco de Asís, the town was founded in the 1840s first as San Benito, and then as its Anglo fishing community grew, it was renamed Spanishtown. In 1874, it was again renamed Half Moon Bay. After rail and road connections in the early 1900s, the town grew. The foggy weather of the coast made the town a popular destination for booze-running during Prohibition.

The city's infrastructure is heavily integrated with the coast, including the Pillar Point Harbor, major roads, and the fire department. The economy of Half Moon Bay is dominated by a few businesses, the biggest of which is the Ritz-Carlton Half Moon Bay. Because of this geography, a 2022 study found that the city had over 123 buildings vulnerable to sea level rise.

== History ==
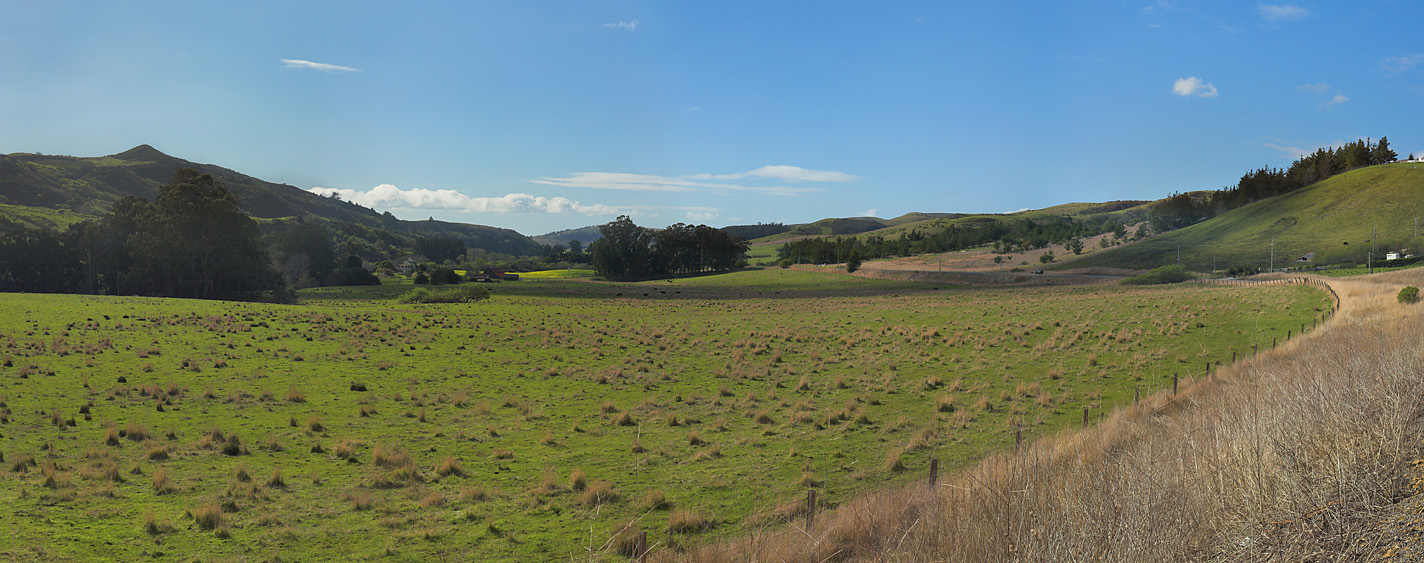
A valley floor outside the city

Half Moon Bay began as a rural agricultural area, primarily used by Mission San Francisco de Asís (established in 1776) for grazing cattle, horses, and oxen. After the Mission's secularization, Tiburcio Vásquez received the Rancho Corral de Tierra Mexican land grant in 1839 and Candelario Miramontes was granted Rancho Miramontes (later known as Rancho San Benito) in 1841.

The community began to develop in the 1840s as San Mateo County's first real town. Originally, San Benito, the town was renamed Spanishtown and attracted a thriving fishing industry in addition to its continued importance to coastal agriculture. Spanishtown became a racially diverse community, settled by Canadians, Chinese, English, Germans, Irish, Mexicans, Italians, Scots, Portuguese, and Pacific Islanders. Regular stagecoach service was established with San Mateo; coaches also served Purissima, Lobitos, and San Gregorio. Levy Brothers opened a department store downtown. Spanishtown was officially renamed Half Moon Bay in 1874.

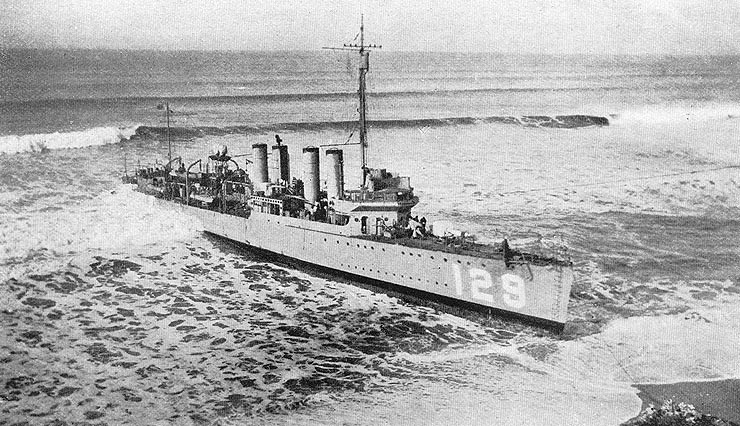
The USS DeLong, run aground

The area grew very slowly, even after the Ocean Shore Railroad began serving the community in 1907. The construction of Pedro Mountain Road in 1914 provided better access to San Francisco and probably contributed to the railroad's demise by 1920. The USS DeLong ran aground at Half Moon Bay on December 1, 1921. During Prohibition "rum runners" took advantage of dense fog and hidden coves in the area to serve several roadhouses and inns, some of which operate today as restaurants (e.g., Moss Beach Distillery). Real growth in the area came after World War II with the construction of numerous subdivisions, eventually leading to Half Moon Bay's incorporation in 1959. The city preserves a historic downtown district that has buildings dating as far back as 1869.

=== 2008 economic downturn and subsequent recovery ===
In 2008, financial setbacks endangered the city's viability. The economic crisis severely affected tourism, which generates the most revenue, and just when the city had finalized an $18 million settlement over a property lawsuit. As the municipal budget was typically $14 million or less, city fathers had issued bonds with annual payments of approximately $1 million over 25 years. As a result of these obstacles, the threat of bankruptcy was very real. Dozens of meetings were held to decide where to cut the budget and finally, 75 percent of municipal employees were laid off and replaced with contract workers. Employee contributions toward retirement benefits were also raised. The city council sought to regain the money paid in the settlement, believing that it should have been paid by the city's insurers. A lawsuit against the insurers was decided in 2013 and the insurer was ordered to pay the city more than $13 million; the Association of Bay Area Governments partially covered the costs of the lawsuit.

As of the publication of the Fiscal Year 2015–16 Budget the General Fund budget was balanced and had a structural surplus of $4 million.

=== 2023 mass shootings ===
On January 23, 2023, mass shootings occurred in Half Moon Bay. A spree killer opened fire at two farms with a semi-automatic pistol, killing seven people and critically injuring an eighth person. A 66-year-old suspect was taken into custody after he arrived in his SUV at the parking lot of the sheriff's office substation.

=== 2024 blocking of low-income housing ===
In 2024, Half Moon Bay politicians were criticized by California Governor Gavin Newsom for repeatedly delaying approval of a 40-unit apartment building for senior farmworkers. Newsom threatened to take legal steps against the city if they continued stalling on the housing. Half Moon Bay Commissioner Rick Hernandez said that they were resistant to approving the senior farmworker housing because "we love the character of our small-town community" claiming that once this proposal is approved, it will trigger more requests for other constructions.

== Geography ==
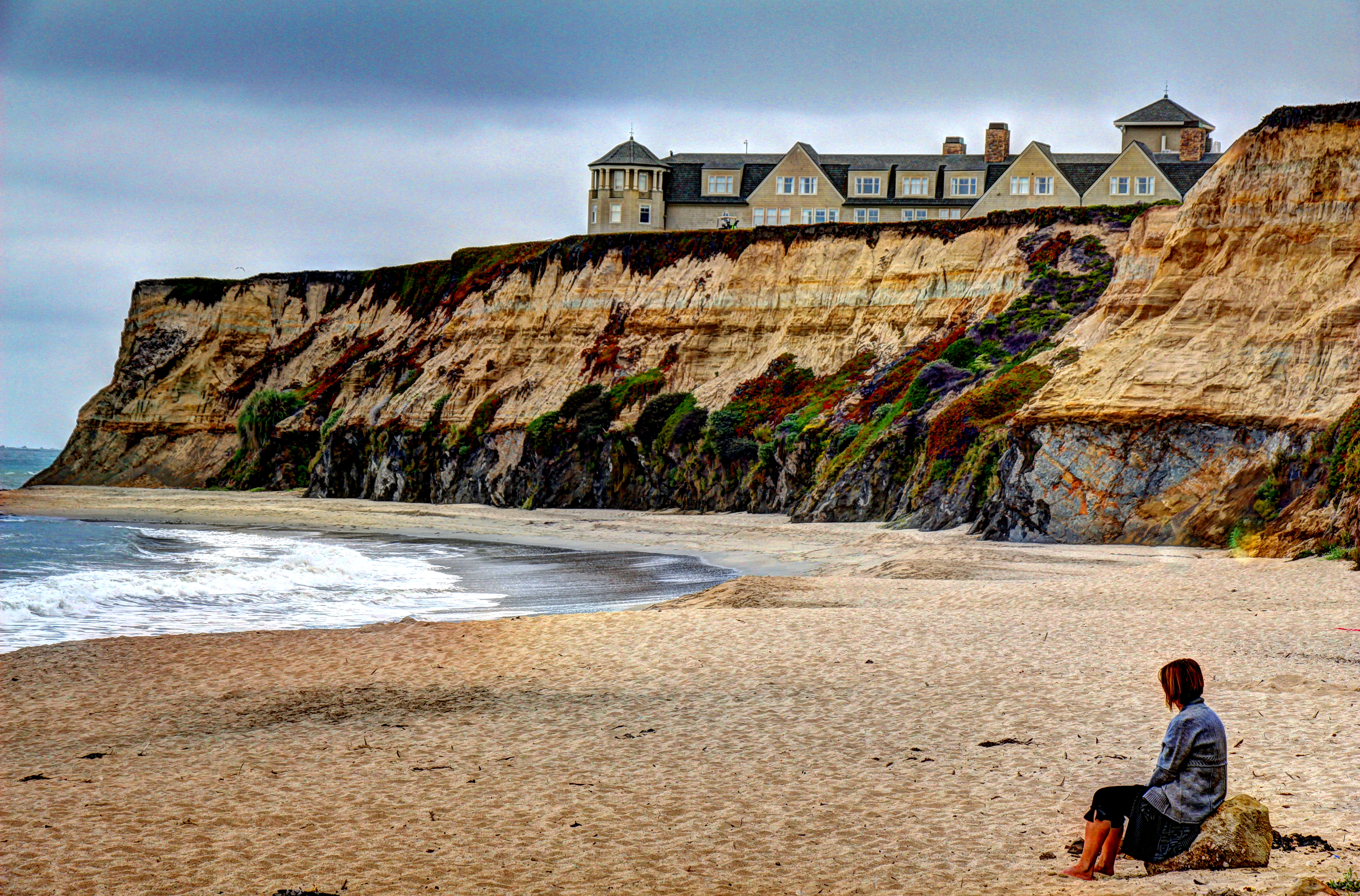
Ritz-Carlton Hotel on the bay

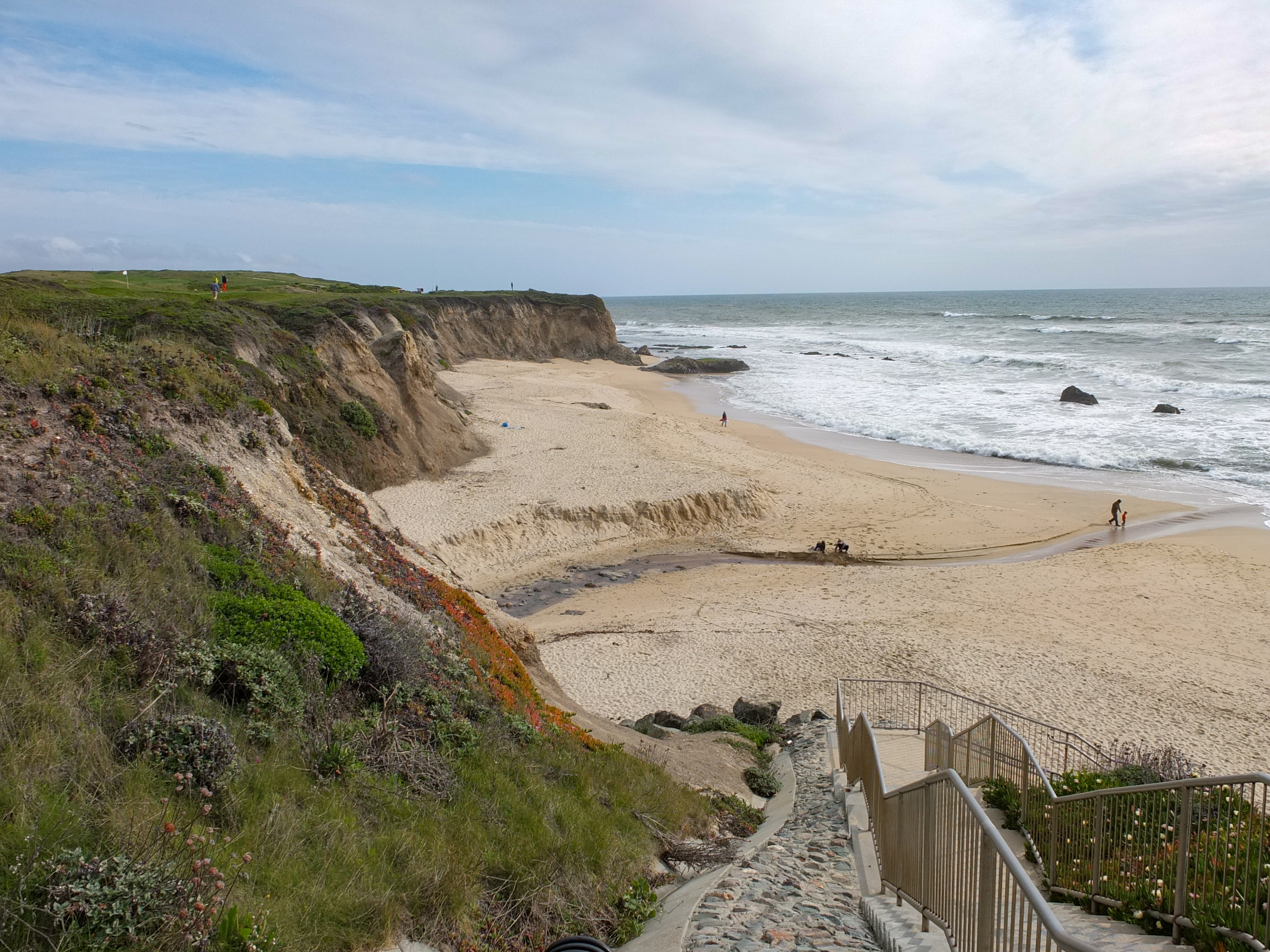
Publicly accessible beach

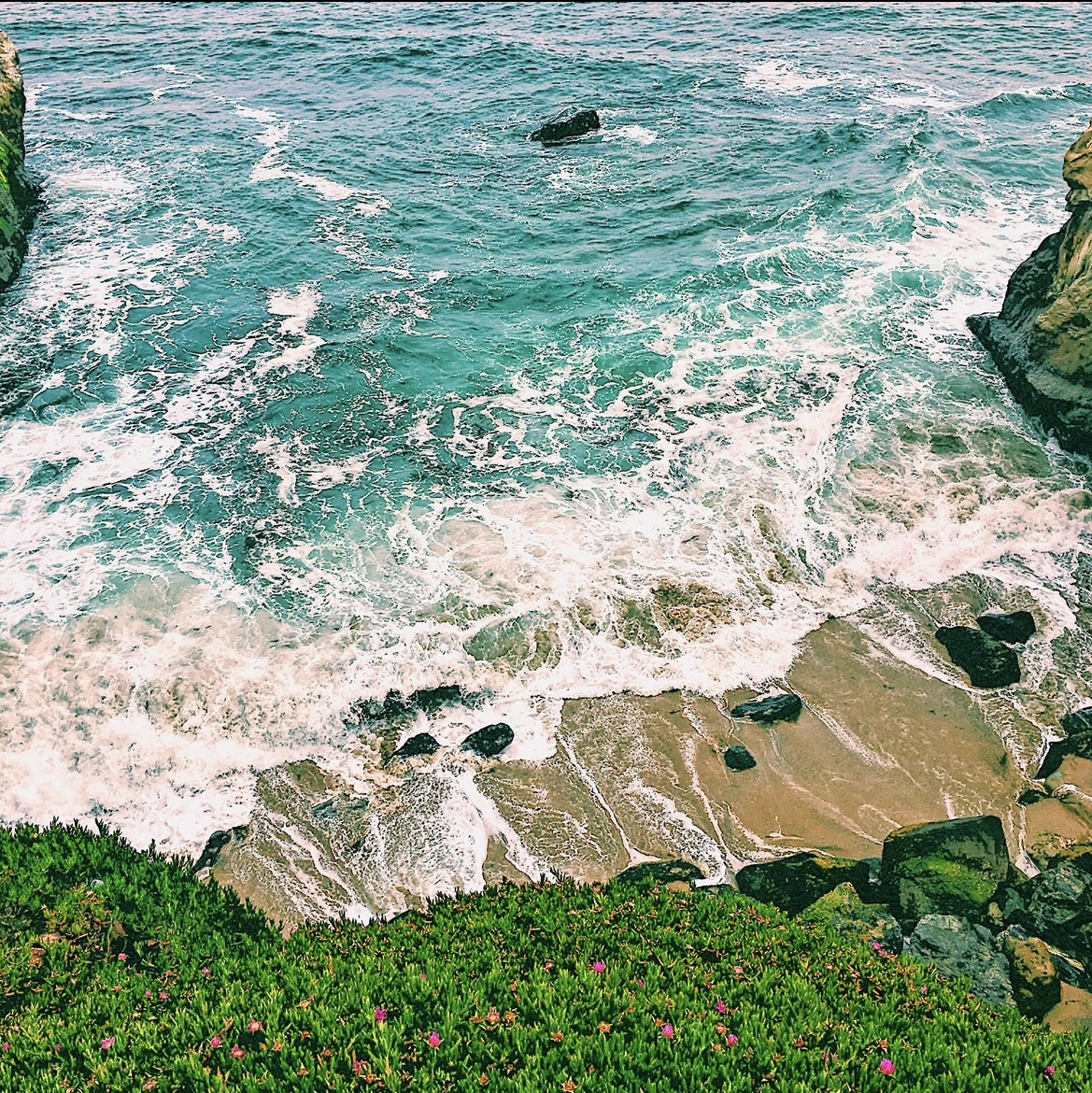
Beach overseen from the cliffs of Half Moon Bay

Half Moon Bay is approximately 25 miles (40 kilometers) south of San Francisco, 10 miles (16 km) west of San Mateo, and 45 miles (72 km) north of Santa Cruz. Neighboring towns include El Granada, Princeton-by-the-Sea, Moss Beach, and Montara to the north and Purissima, San Gregorio, and Pescadero to the south. The city limits of Half Moon Bay run up the coast from the main part of the town to include the neighborhoods of Frenchman's Creek and Miramar Beach, with the northernmost extant overlooking Pillar Point Harbor.

According to the United States Census Bureau, the city has a total area of 6.3 square miles (16.2 km^{2}), of which 6.3 square miles (16.2 km^{2}) is land and 0.012 square miles (0.03 km^{2}) (0.17%) is water. The town is situated on a bay of the same name. Major local industries include agriculture (houseplants, floriculture, Christmas trees, pumpkins, artichokes), fishing, and tourism. Historically, Half Moon Bay had been known as San Benito and Spanishtown. A 2022 study of the effects of sea level rise, found that both major tourism attractions, and other infrastructure would be under threat from projected Sea level rise caused by global warming. The study found at least 123 buildings, including the Ritz Carlton (a major employer for the town), Pigeon Point Lighthouse and the Pescadero Cal Fire Station would be seriously threatened by erosion if sea level were to rise by 5 feet (1.5 m).

Streams in Half Moon Bay include Frenchmans, Pilarcitos and Naples Creeks.

=== Climate ===
Half Moon Bay usually has mild weather throughout the year. Under the Köppen climate classification, it has a warm-summer Mediterranean climate (Köppen Csb). Hot weather is rare; the average annual days with highs of 90 degrees Fahrenheit (32 degrees Celsius) or higher is only 0.4 days. Cold weather is also rare with an annual average of 2.5 days with lows of 32 °F (0 °C) or lower. Typical of Northern California, most of the rain falls from November to April. The normal annual precipitation is 26.2 inches (665 millimeters). Snowfall along the coast in Half Moon Bay has never been measurable; however, snow flurries were observed on December 12, 1972, February 5, 1976, and February 23, 2023. There is often fog and overcast during the night and morning hours, usually clearing offshore during the afternoon. Persistent sea breezes help to moderate the climate along the coast; farther from the ocean, in places such as Pilarcitos Creek, days are often warmer and nights cooler than on the coast. For the 37th parallel north, the mild summer temperatures of Half Moon Bay are unmatched across the board. Relatively nearby inland cities see significantly warmer temperatures at the same time. Despite the low latitude and strong maritime influence, nights remain very cool, even in the summer.

January is the coolest month with an average high of 58.4 °F (14.7 °C) and an average low of 42.9 °F (6.1 °C). September is the warmest month with an average high of 66.8 °F (19.3 °C) and an average low of 51.2 °F (10.7 °C).

The most rainfall recorded in Half Moon Bay in one month was 15.70 inches (399 mm) in February 1998. The heaviest 24-hour rainfall was 5.33 inches (135 mm) on January 4, 1982. There are an average of 86 days with measurable rainfall.

Climate data for Half Moon Bay, California, 1991–2020 normals, extremes 1939–present
Month	Jan	Feb	Mar	Apr	May	Jun	Jul	Aug	Sep	Oct	Nov	Dec	Year
Record high °F (°C)	76 (24)	78 (26)	83 (28)	84 (29)	82 (28)	89 (32)	81 (27)	88 (31)	92 (33)	94 (34)	87 (31)	79 (26)	94 (34)
Mean maximum °F (°C)	68.9 (20.5)	71.0 (21.7)	71.4 (21.9)	73.0 (22.8)	70.7 (21.5)	70.6 (21.4)	70.6 (21.4)	73.1 (22.8)	77.7 (25.4)	85.6 (29.8)	75.3 (24.1)	67.9 (19.9)	86.4 (30.2)
Mean daily maximum °F (°C)	59.4 (15.2)	59.5 (15.3)	60.4 (15.8)	61.0 (16.1)	61.7 (16.5)	63.9 (17.7)	64.8 (18.2)	65.6 (18.7)	66.4 (19.1)	66.4 (19.1)	62.7 (17.1)	59.0 (15.0)	62.6 (17.0)
Daily mean °F (°C)	51.4 (10.8)	51.3 (10.7)	52.1 (11.2)	52.9 (11.6)	54.9 (12.7)	56.9 (13.8)	58.8 (14.9)	59.7 (15.4)	58.8 (14.9)	57.1 (13.9)	53.7 (12.1)	50.9 (10.5)	54.9 (12.7)
Mean daily minimum °F (°C)	43.4 (6.3)	43.0 (6.1)	43.7 (6.5)	44.7 (7.1)	48.0 (8.9)	49.9 (9.9)	52.7 (11.5)	53.9 (12.2)	51.3 (10.7)	47.9 (8.8)	44.8 (7.1)	42.9 (6.1)	47.2 (8.4)
Mean minimum °F (°C)	33.3 (0.7)	33.7 (0.9)	35.0 (1.7)	36.1 (2.3)	39.3 (4.1)	41.4 (5.2)	45.6 (7.6)	46.3 (7.9)	42.9 (6.1)	38.9 (3.8)	35.2 (1.8)	32.4 (0.2)	30.3 (−0.9)
Record low °F (°C)	27 (−3)	22 (−6)	28 (−2)	31 (−1)	33 (1)	36 (2)	40 (4)	41 (5)	35 (2)	33 (1)	30 (−1)	19 (−7)	19 (−7)
Average precipitation inches (mm)	5.07 (129)	4.73 (120)	3.67 (93)	1.81 (46)	0.96 (24)	0.36 (9.1)	0.14 (3.6)	0.23 (5.8)	0.21 (5.3)	1.26 (32)	2.43 (62)	5.17 (131)	26.04 (661)
Average precipitation days (≥ 0.01 in)	14.4	14.0	13.9	8.8	7.2	5.0	7.0	7.6	6.3	7.7	10.6	13.4	115.9
Source: NOAA

== Demographics ==
Historical population
Census	Pop.	Note	%±
1960	1,957		—
1970	4,023		105.6%
1980	7,282		81.0%
1990	8,886		22.0%
2000	11,842		33.3%
2010	11,324		−4.4%
2020	11,795		4.2%
U.S. Decennial Census; 1860–1870 1880-1890; 1900 1910 1920; 1930 1940 1950; 1960 1970 1980; 1990 2000 2010; 2020

=== Racial and ethnic composition ===
Half Moon Bay city, California – Racial and ethnic composition Note: the US Census treats Hispanic/Latino as an ethnic category. This table excludes Latinos from the racial categories and assigns them to a separate category. Hispanics/Latinos may be of any race.
Race / Ethnicity (NH = Non-Hispanic)	Pop 2000	Pop 2010	Pop 2020	% 2000	% 2010	% 2020
White alone (NH)	7,882	6,977	6,948	66.56%	61.61%	58.91%
Black or African American alone (NH)	448	65	78	3.78%	0.57%	0.66%
Native American or Alaska Native alone (NH)	28	20	15	0.24%	0.18%	0.13%
Asian alone (NH)	391	472	699	3.30%	4.17%	5.93%
Native Hawaiian or Pacific Islander alone (NH)	14	8	15	0.12%	0.07%	0.13%
Other race alone (NH)	21	10	42	0.18%	0.09%	0.36%
Mixed race or Multiracial (NH)	307	209	494	2.59%	1.85%	4.19%
Hispanic or Latino (any race)	2,751	3,563	3,504	23.23%	31.46%	29.71%
Total	11,842	11,324	11,795	100.00%	100.00%	100.00%

=== 2020 census ===
As of the 2020 census, Half Moon Bay had a population of 11,795. The population density was 1,889.6 inhabitants per square mile (729.6/km^{2}). The median age was 47.6 years. The age distribution was 18.8% under the age of 18, 6.7% aged 18 to 24, 21.3% aged 25 to 44, 29.3% aged 45 to 64, and 23.9% aged 65 or older. For every 100 females, there were 90.8 males, and for every 100 females age 18 and over, there were 89.5 males age 18 and over.

The census reported that 99.5% of the population lived in households, 58 people (0.5%) lived in non-institutionalized group quarters, and no one was institutionalized. There were 4,569 households, out of which 26.8% had children under the age of 18 living in them. Of all households, 53.9% were married-couple households, 4.3% were cohabiting-couple households, 27.4% had a female householder with no spouse or partner present, and 14.4% had a male householder with no spouse or partner present. About 27.6% of households were one person households, and 18.2% had someone living alone who was 65 years of age or older. The average household size was 2.57, and 3,040 families (66.5% of all households) were recorded.

There were 4,833 housing units at an average density of 774.3 units per square mile (299.0 units/km^{2}), of which 94.5% were occupied. Of occupied units, 68.7% were owner-occupied and 31.3% were occupied by renters. The homeowner vacancy rate was 0.7%, the rental vacancy rate was 2.6%, and 5.5% of housing units were vacant.

97.3% of residents lived in urban areas, while 2.7% lived in rural areas.

Racial composition as of the 2020 census
Race	Number	Percent
White	7,371	62.5%
Black or African American	81	0.7%
American Indian and Alaska Native	92	0.8%
Asian	726	6.2%
Native Hawaiian and Other Pacific Islander	16	0.1%
Some other race	1,662	14.1%
Two or more races	1,847	15.7%

=== 2023 ACS estimates ===
In 2023, the US Census Bureau estimated that 20.8% of the population were foreign-born. Of all people aged 5 or older, 67.4% spoke only English at home, 26.0% spoke Spanish, 3.8% spoke other Indo-European languages, 2.3% spoke Asian or Pacific Islander languages, and 0.4% spoke other languages. Of those aged 25 or older, 91.3% were high school graduates and 53.2% had a bachelor's degree.

The median household income in 2023 was $153,199, and the per capita income was $81,034. About 2.3% of families and 6.2% of the population were below the poverty line.

=== 2010 census ===
The 2010 United States census reported that Half Moon Bay had a population of 11,324. The population density was 1,757.1 inhabitants per square mile (678.4/km^{2}). The racial makeup of Half Moon Bay was 8,580 (75.8%) White, 82 (0.7%) African American, 71 (0.6%) Native American, 490 (4.3%) Asian, 9 (0.1%) Pacific Islander, 1,710 (15.1%) from other races, and 382 (3.4%) from two or more races. Hispanic or Latino of any race were 3,563 persons (31.5%).

The Census reported that 11,306 people (99.8% of the population) lived in households, 18 (0.2%) lived in non-institutionalized group quarters, and 0 (0%) were institutionalized.

There were 4,149 households, out of which 1,264 (30.5%) had children under the age of 18 living in them, 2,373 (57.2%) were opposite-sex married couples living together, 293 (7.1%) had a female householder with no husband present, 156 (3.8%) had a male householder with no wife present. There were 208 (5.0%) unmarried opposite-sex partnerships, and 41 (1.0%) same-sex married couples or partnerships. 1,067 households (25.7%) were made up of individuals, and 538 (13.0%) had someone living alone who was 65 years of age or older. The average household size was 2.72. There were 2,822 families (68.0% of all households); the average family size was 3.24.

The population was spread out, with 2,533 people (22.4%) under the age of 18, 796 people (7.0%) aged 18 to 24, 2,587 people (22.8%) aged 25 to 44, 3,644 people (32.2%) aged 45 to 64, and 1,764 people (15.6%) who were 65 years of age or older. The median age was 43.2 years. For every 100 females, there were 95.1 males. For every 100 females aged 18 and over, there were 93.8 males.

There were 4,395 housing units at an average density of 682.0 units per square mile (263.3 units/km^{2}), of which 2,944 (71.0%) were owner-occupied, and 1,205 (29.0%) were occupied by renters. The homeowner vacancy rate was 1.0%; the rental vacancy rate was 1.9%. 7,645 people (67.5% of the population) lived in owner-occupied housing units and 3,661 people (32.3%) lived in rental housing units.

== Economy ==
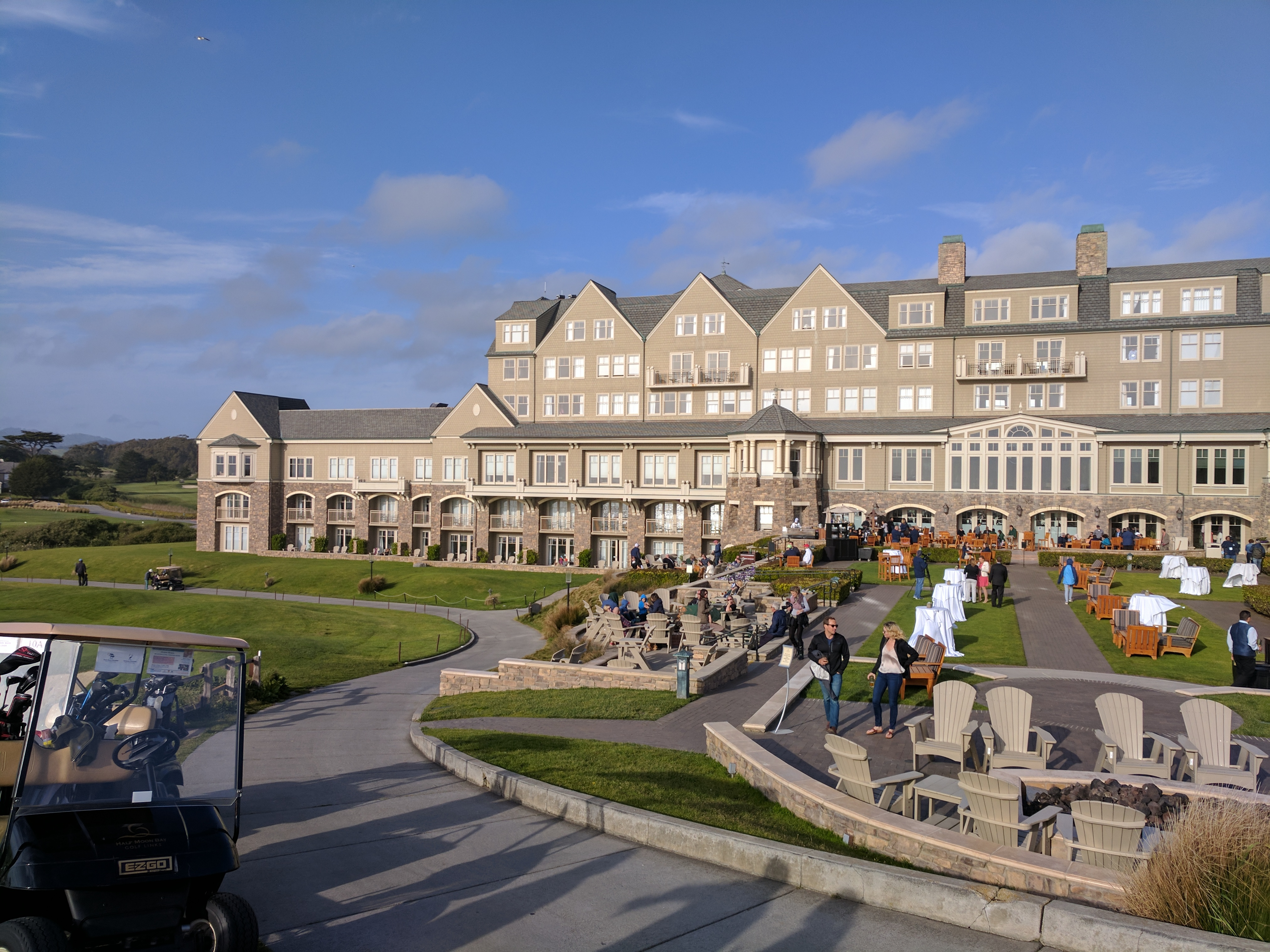
Ocean Lawn at the Ritz-Carlton Hotel Half Moon Bay

The economy of Half Moon Bay is dominated by a handful of businesses, the biggest of which is the Ritz-Carlton Half Moon Bay which employs 500 people and is a major source of property tax and tourism income for the city. The Institute for the Study of Knowledge Management in Education is headquartered in Half Moon Bay. GoPro was started in 2002 in Half Moon Bay, and then moved its headquarters to San Mateo, in 2012. Odwalla was based in Half Moon Bay, but then relocated its headquarters to Dinuba, on May 31, 2013

=== Top employers ===
According to the city's 2023 Annual Comprehensive Financial Report, the top employers in the city were:

#	Employer	# of Employees
1	Ritz-Carlton Half Moon Bay	150
2	New Leaf Community Market	105
3	Sam's Chowder House	98
4	Safeway	65
5	Rocket Farms Inc.	62
6	SP Plus	50
7	San Benito House	49
8	Pasta Moon Inc	48
9	McMahon Floral	47
10	Beach House LLC	45

=== Pillar Point Harbor ===
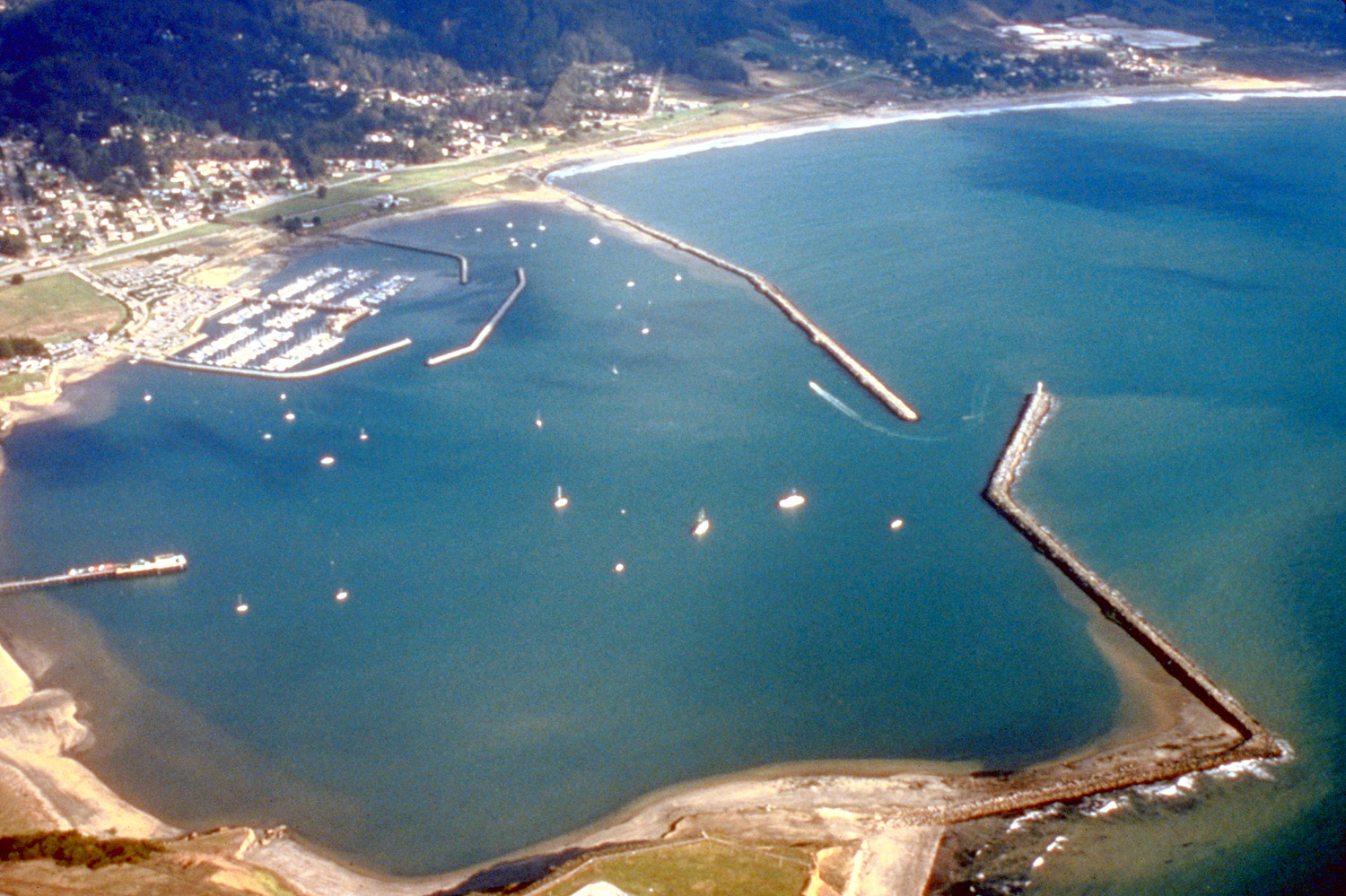
Eastern aerial view of Pillar Point Harbor

The Pillar Point Harbor at the northern edge of Half Moon Bay offers a protected landing for boats and provides other marine infrastructure. In the late 1980s, a new master plan was developed for the Harbor. A variety of fish species have been identified in the harbor area. At the harbor, fishermen sell crab and fish catches straight off their boats at discount prices directly to the public, and restaurants will filet the fish for purchasers.

The Half Moon Bay Yacht Club has facilities at the harbor.

== Arts and culture ==
=== Notable buildings ===
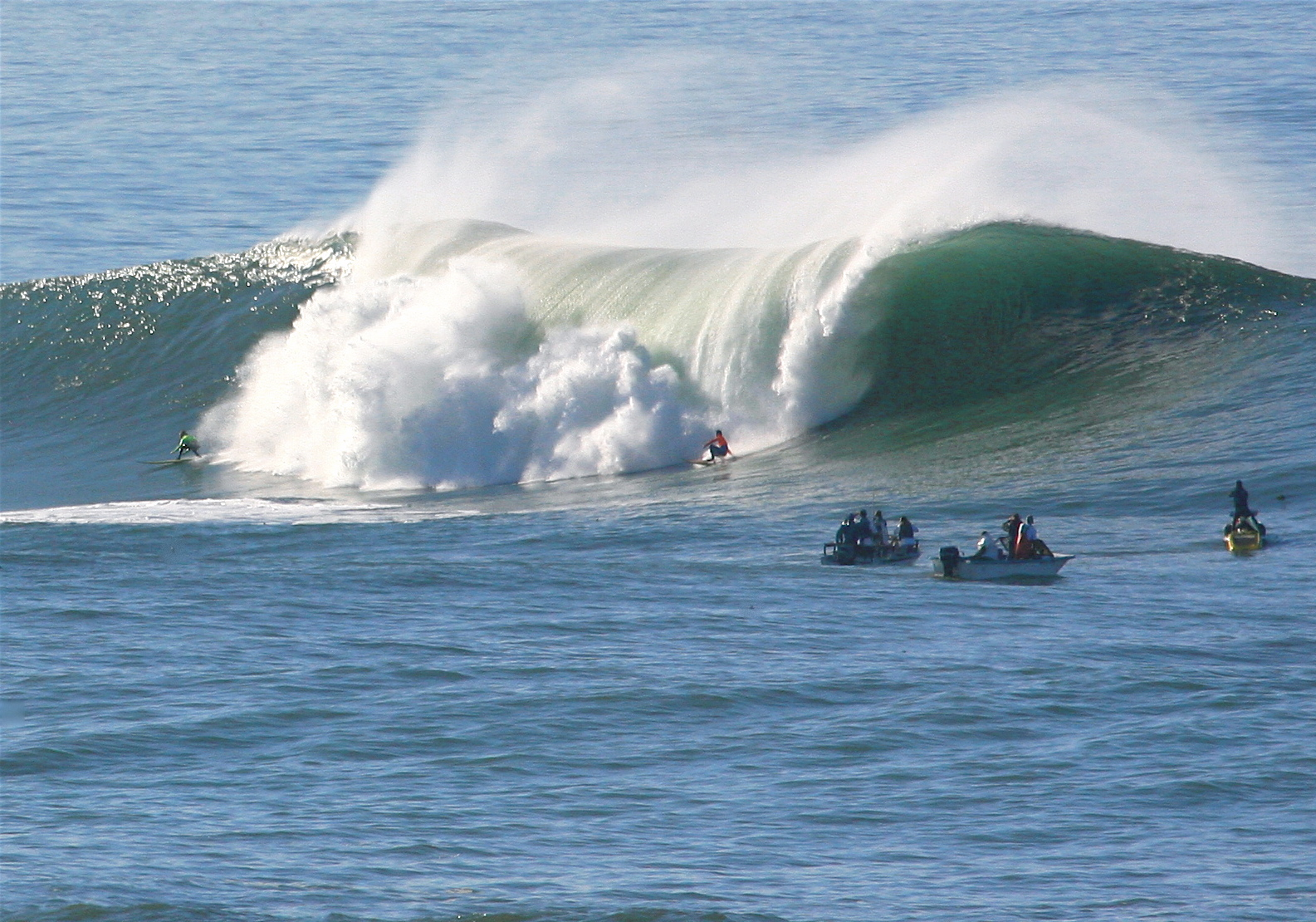
Surfers at Mavericks

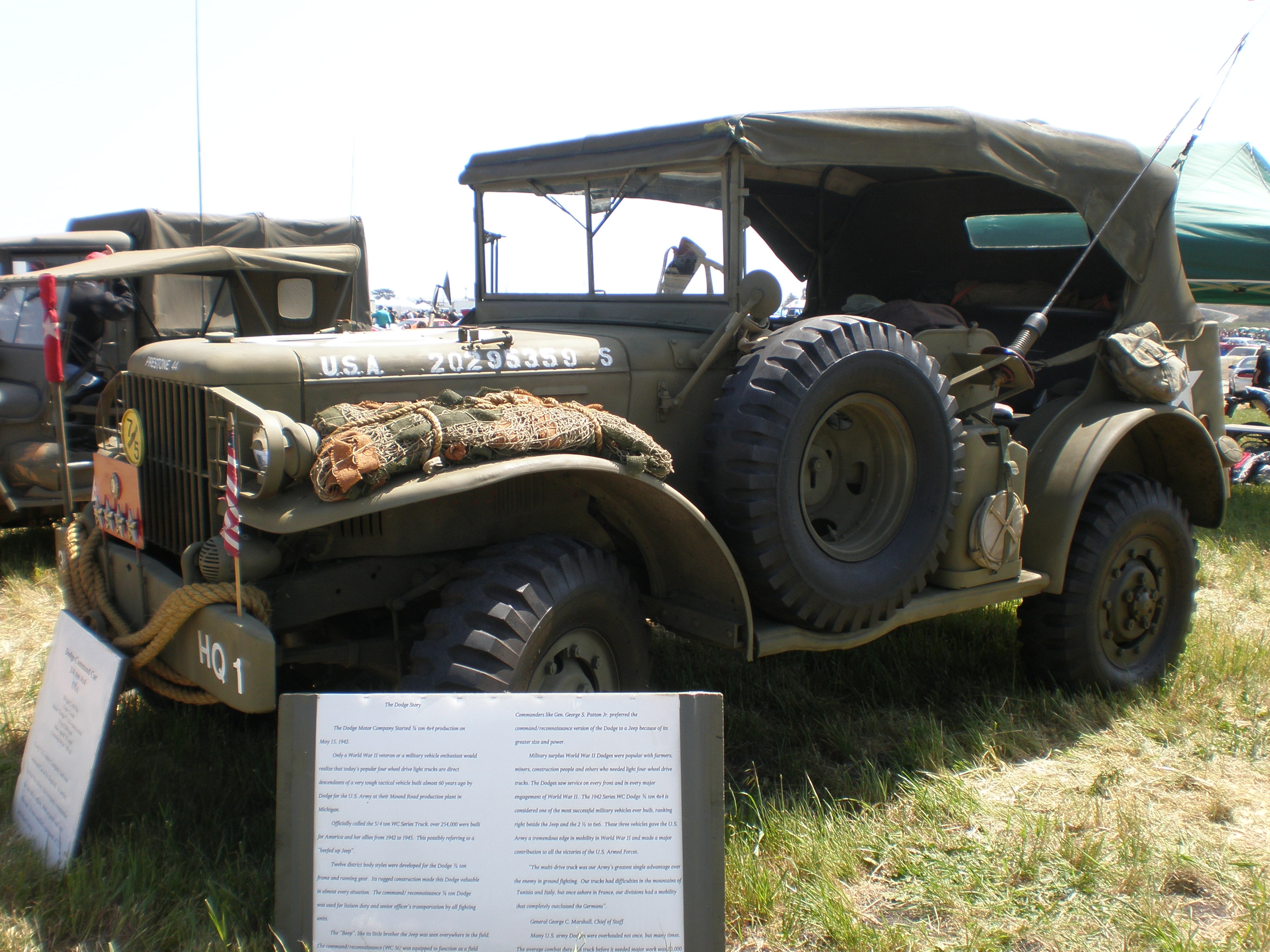
Dodge WC series command car, at the 2009 Pacific Coast Dream Machines

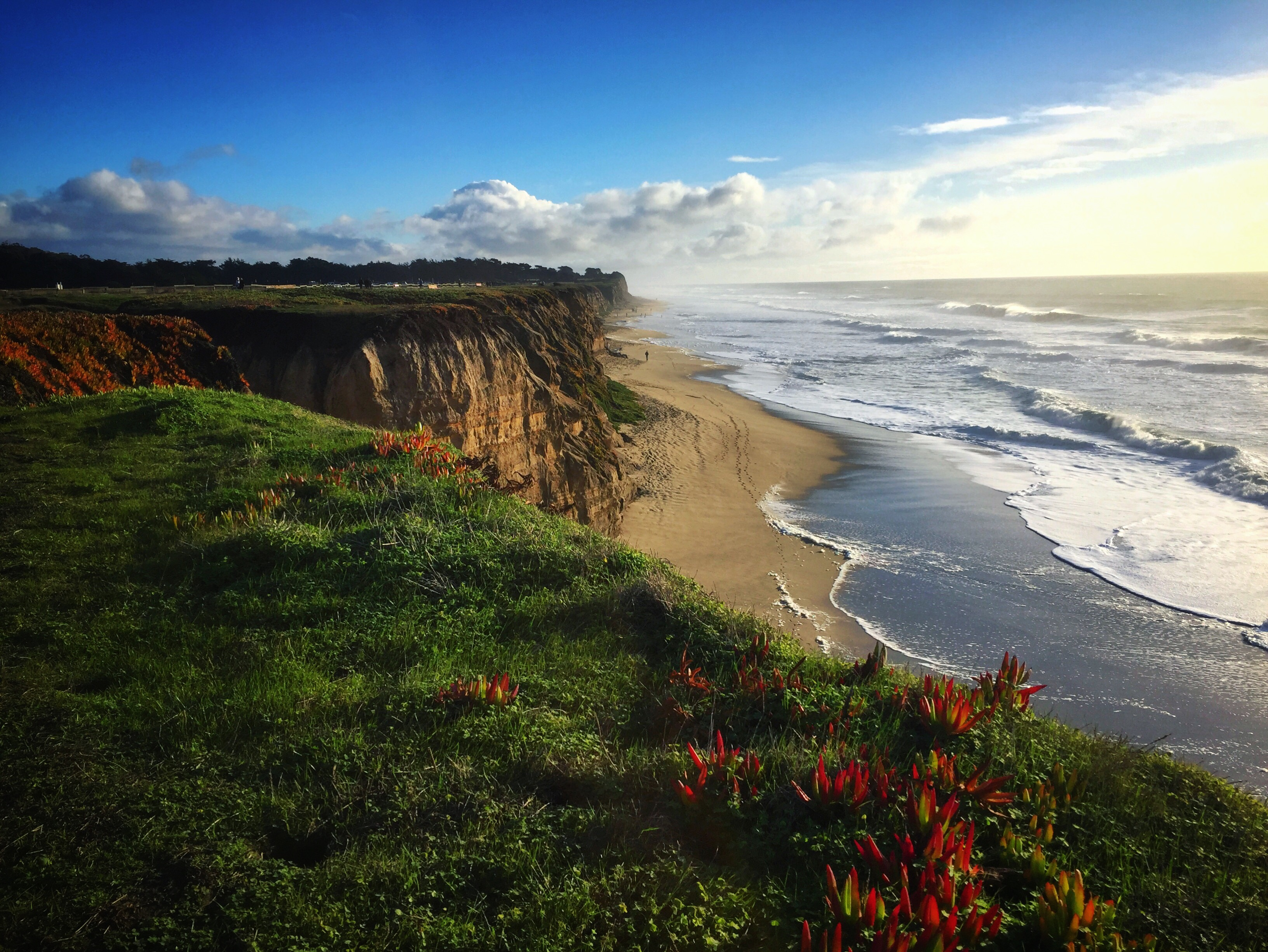
Cliffs overlooking Half Moon Bay State Beach

The city has four sites listed at the National Register of Historic Places: the Methodist Episcopal Church at Half Moon Bay, the William Adam Simmons House, the Robert Mills Dairy Barn, and the James Johnston House. The remnants of the village of Purissima, perhaps the only ghost town in San Mateo County, are four miles (6.4 km) south of the city, near the junction of State Route 1 and Verde Road.

There is an artist's collective, Colony of Coastside Artists, downtown has several galleries, and there are art classes and workshops available locally.

The Ritz-Carlton Half Moon Bay is a major employer. The hotel was used as the wedding venue for the 2003 comedy film, American Wedding.

=== Events ===
The Half Moon Bay Airport hosts an annual benefit event in April, Pacific Coast Dream Machines, which features aircraft and automobiles. Half Moon Bay also hosts an annual Art and Pumpkin Festival in October.

== Parks and recreation ==
The region around Half Moon Bay contains several state parks and beaches, including:

- Half Moon Bay State Beach
- Poplar Beach
- San Gregorio State Beach
- Pomponio State Beach
- Fitzgerald Marine Reserve, located north of Half Moon Bay, is a refuge for plants and animals adapted to live at the shoreline.

At the north edge of the bay is the big wave surf area, Mavericks, off Pillar Point, where surfers challenge waves over 50 feet (15 m) tall. From 1999 to 2016, it was the location of the annual Titans of Mavericks competition.

Montara Mountain, located North of Half Moon Bay, is a popular outdoor recreation spot and home to the old Highway 1.

== Government ==
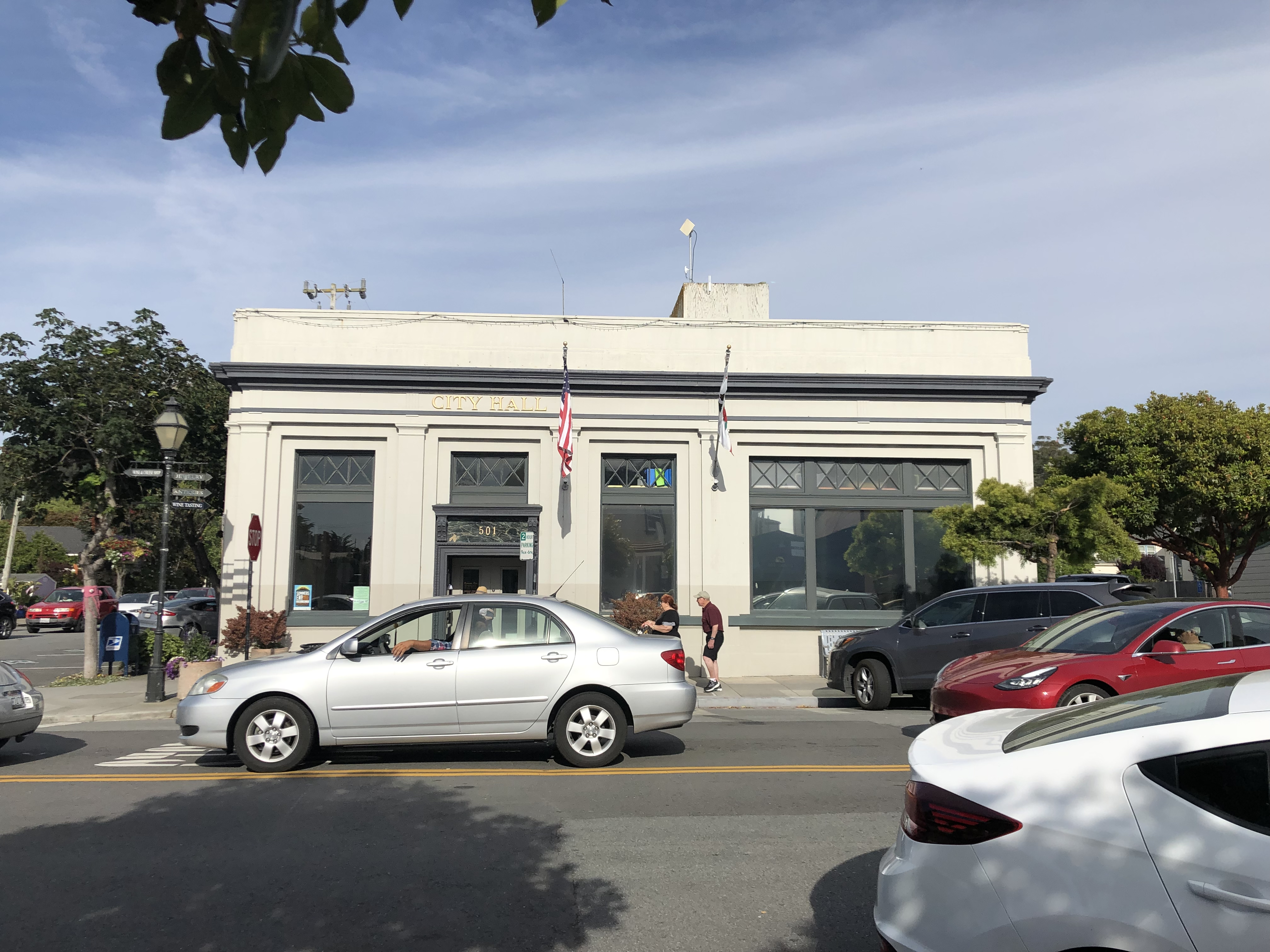
Half Moon Bay City Hall

In the California State Legislature, Half Moon Bay is in the 13th senatorial district, represented by Democrat Josh Becker, and in the 23rd Assembly district, represented by Democrat Marc Berman.

In the United States House of Representatives, Half Moon Bay is in California's 16th congressional district, represented by Democrat Sam Liccardo.

Fire protection for the city of Half Moon Bay is provided by the Coastside Fire Protection District, which contracts for service with CalFire.

Law enforcement for the City of Half Moon Bay is provided under a contract with the San Mateo County Sheriff's Office.

According to the California Secretary of State, as of February 10, 2019, Half Moon Bay has 7,549 registered voters. Of those, 3,603 (47.7%) are registered Democrats, 1,380 (18.3%) are registered Republicans, and 2,142 (28.4%) have declined to state a political party.

== Education ==
The Cabrillo Unified School District serves the city. Schools include Half Moon Bay High School, Cunha Middle School and Hatch Elementary School although many students are bused to other Cabrillo Unified Schools (Farallone View Elementary and El Granada Elementary) in the unincorporated area north of the City and King Mountain off Skyline Boulevard south of Highway 92.

The city is served by the Peninsula Library System.

== Media ==
- Half Moon Bay Review, online newspaper
- Half Moon Bay Patch, online newspaper

== Transportation ==
Primary road access is via State Route 1 (the Cabrillo Highway) from the north and south, and State Route 92 from the east.

The city is served by Half Moon Bay Airport.

SamTrans routes 294 and 117 provide service to Half Moon Bay from the Hillsdale Caltrain station in San Mateo and Linda Mar in Pacifica, respectively.

== References and appearances in culture ==
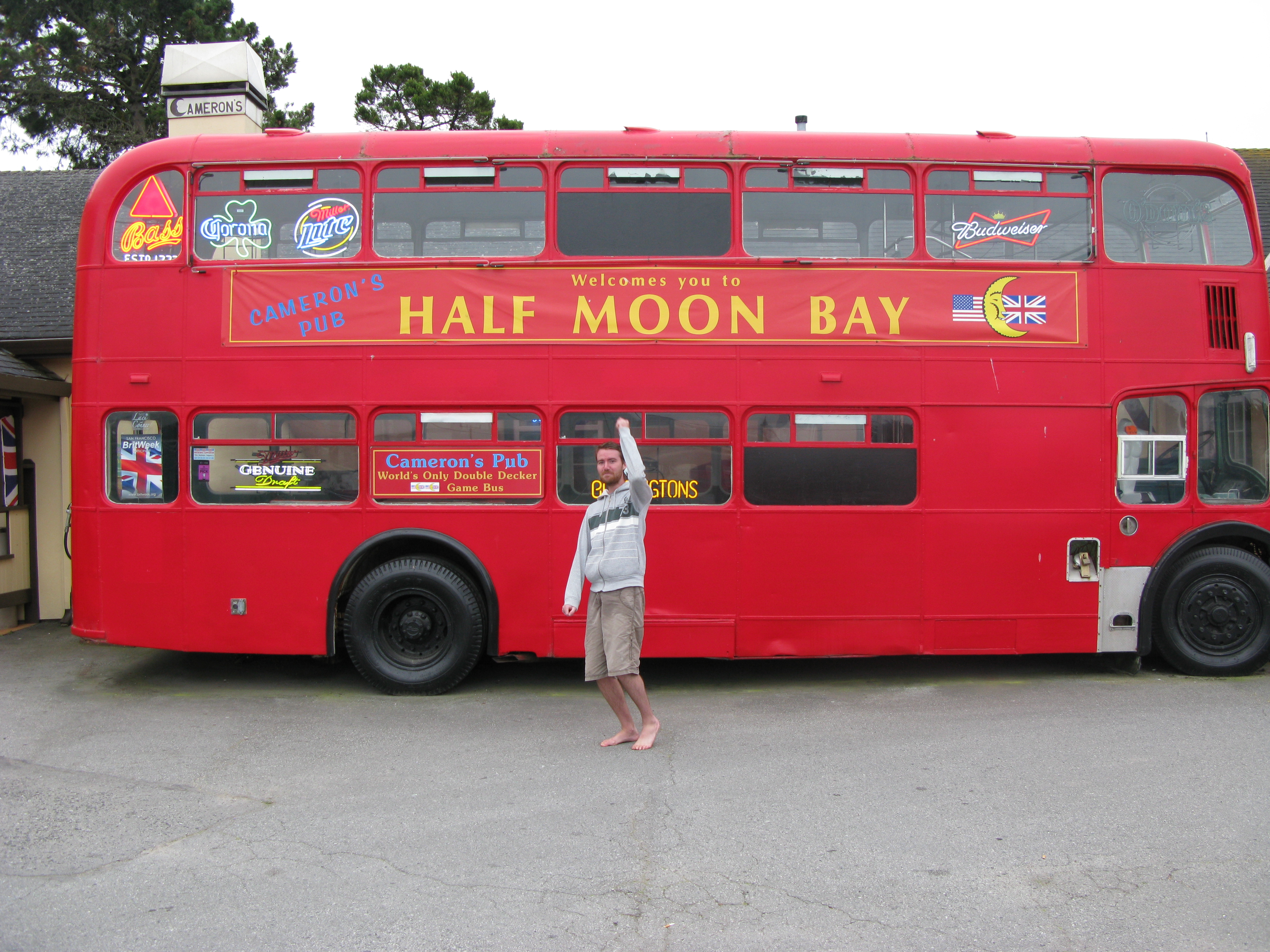
A local bus featured prominently in the film Birdemic.

The World War II United States Navy seaplane tender USS Half Moon (AVP-26) was named for Half Moon Bay and retained the name when serving as a United States Coast Guard weather reporting ship USCGC Half Moon for more than 20 years after the war.

The album Half Moon Bay was recorded by jazz pianist Bill Evans in 1973 at the Bach Dancing and Dynamite Society in Half Moon Bay.

Half Moon Bay is the primary setting of the 2010 B-movie Birdemic: Shock and Terror.

Belinda Carlisle shot her music video for Circle in the Sand at Half Moon Bay.

== Notable people ==
- John Cardiel, skateboarder
- Jon Miller, Hall of Fame broadcaster for the San Francisco Giants
- Charlee Minkin (born 1981), Olympic judoka
- John Montefusco, former pitcher for the San Francisco Giants and Atlanta Braves
- Jay Moriarity, surfer and free diver, youngest person to surf Mavericks, depicted in the film Chasing Mavericks
- Al Pereira, professional wrestler, twice holder of the European Heavyweight Championship
- Dorothy Wagner Puccinelli, muralist and artist
- Richard Rhodes, Pulitzer Prize-winning author and historian
- Phil Schiller, senior vice president at Apple
