= Community United Methodist Church (Half Moon Bay, California) =

Historic church in California, United States

- Methodist Episcopal Church at Half Moon Bay
- U.S. National Register of Historic Places
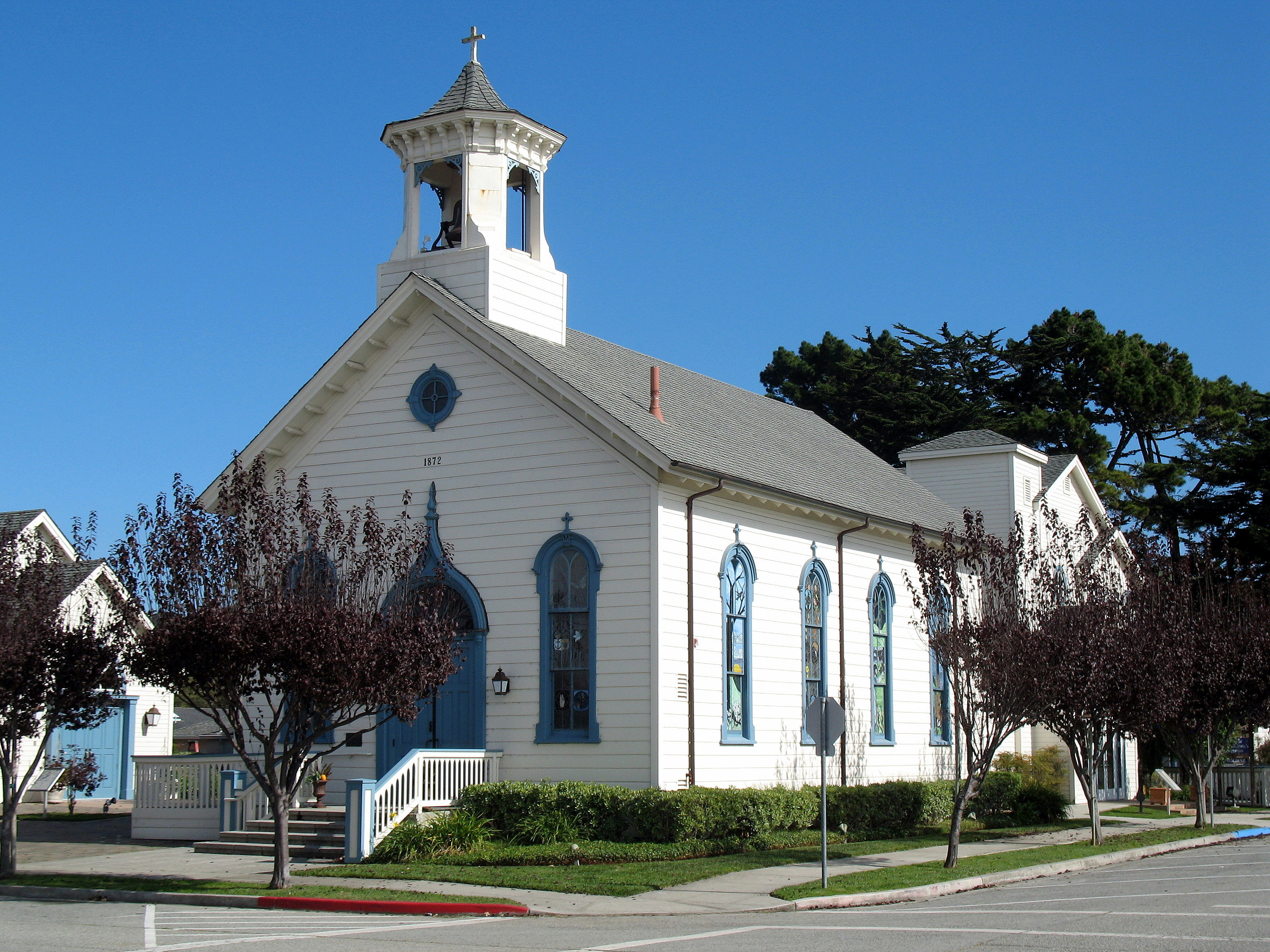

- Location within San Francisco Bay Area Location within California Location within the United States
- Location: 777 Miramontes St., Half Moon Bay, California
- Coordinates: 37°27′46″N 122°25′37″W
- Area: 0.5 acres (0.20 ha)
- Built: 1872
- Architect: Charles Geddes
- Architectural style: Gothic Revival, Victorian Gothic revival
- NRHP reference No.: 80000854
- Added to NRHP: November 10, 1980

The Community United Methodist Church is a historic United Methodist Church in Half Moon Bay, California. Originally the Methodist Episcopal Church at Half Moon Bay, it was built in 1872 and was added to the National Register of Historic Places in 1980.

The building is 30 by 50 feet (9.1 m × 15.2 m) in plan and has with 20 feet (6.1 m) tall side walls.

It was damaged by the 1906 San Francisco earthquake, which shook it off its foundation.
