= Tunitas Creek =

Stream in San Mateo County, California

Tunitas Creek Arroyo De Las Tunitas
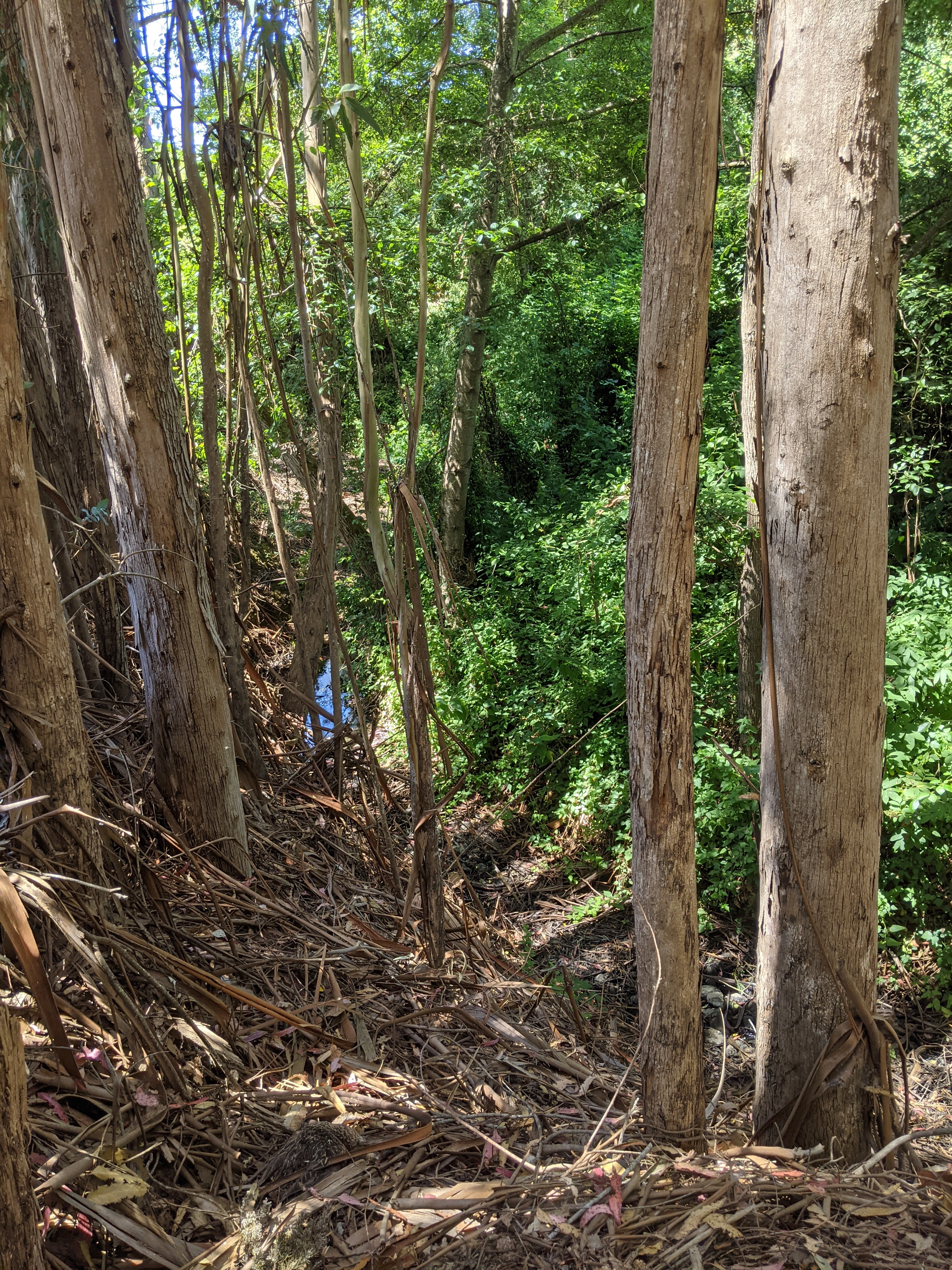
- Etymology: little prickly pears

Physical characteristics
- Mouth
  - coordinates: 37.3566091°N 122.3996964°W
- Length: 6.6 mi (10.6 km)

Basin features
- Landmarks: Tunitas Creek Open Space Preserve

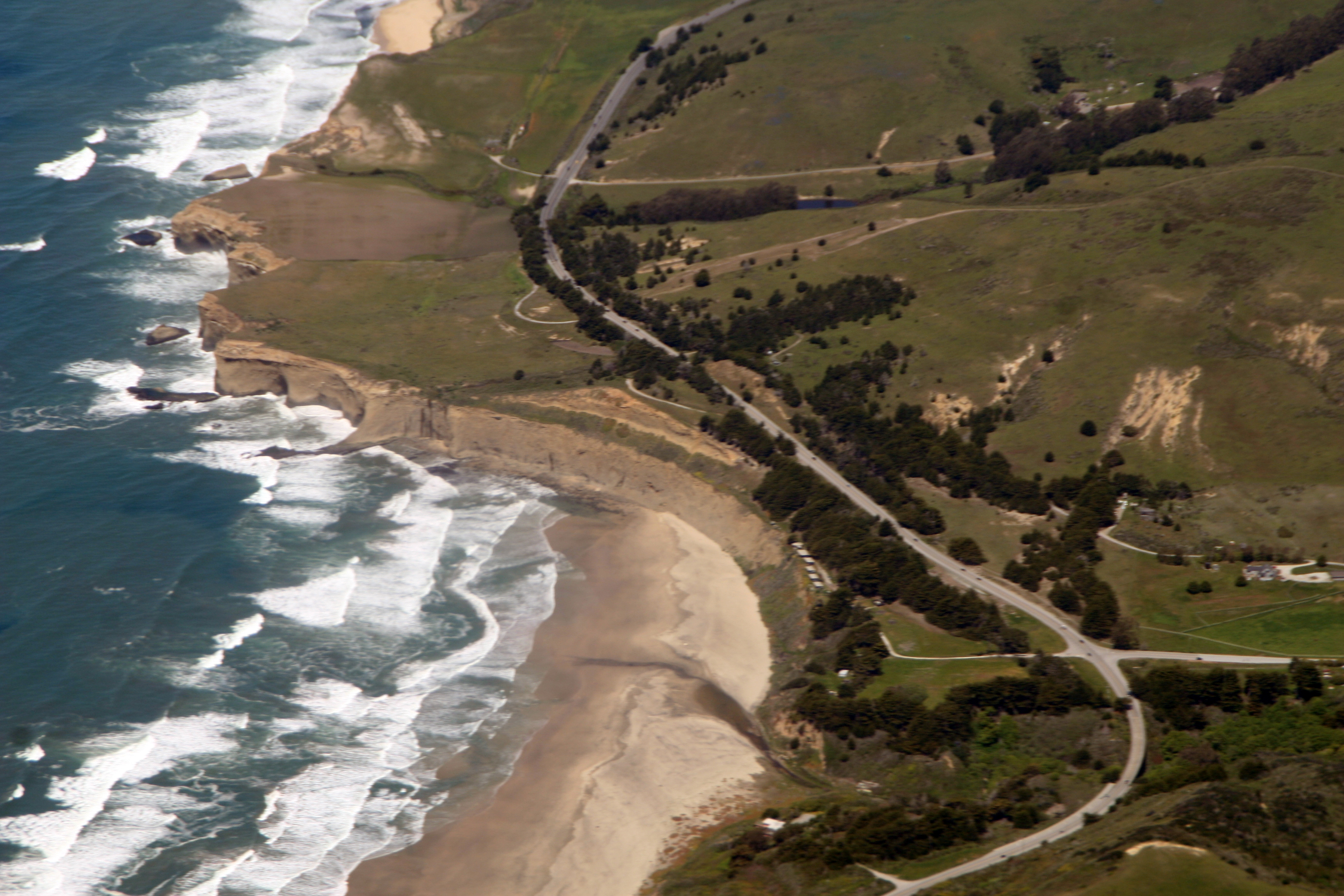
Tunitas Creek at its outflow across Tunitas Beach. Faint traces of the old Ocean Shore Railroad can be seen at top left center, between the road and shoreline. Gordon's Chute was along the cliffs at upper left.

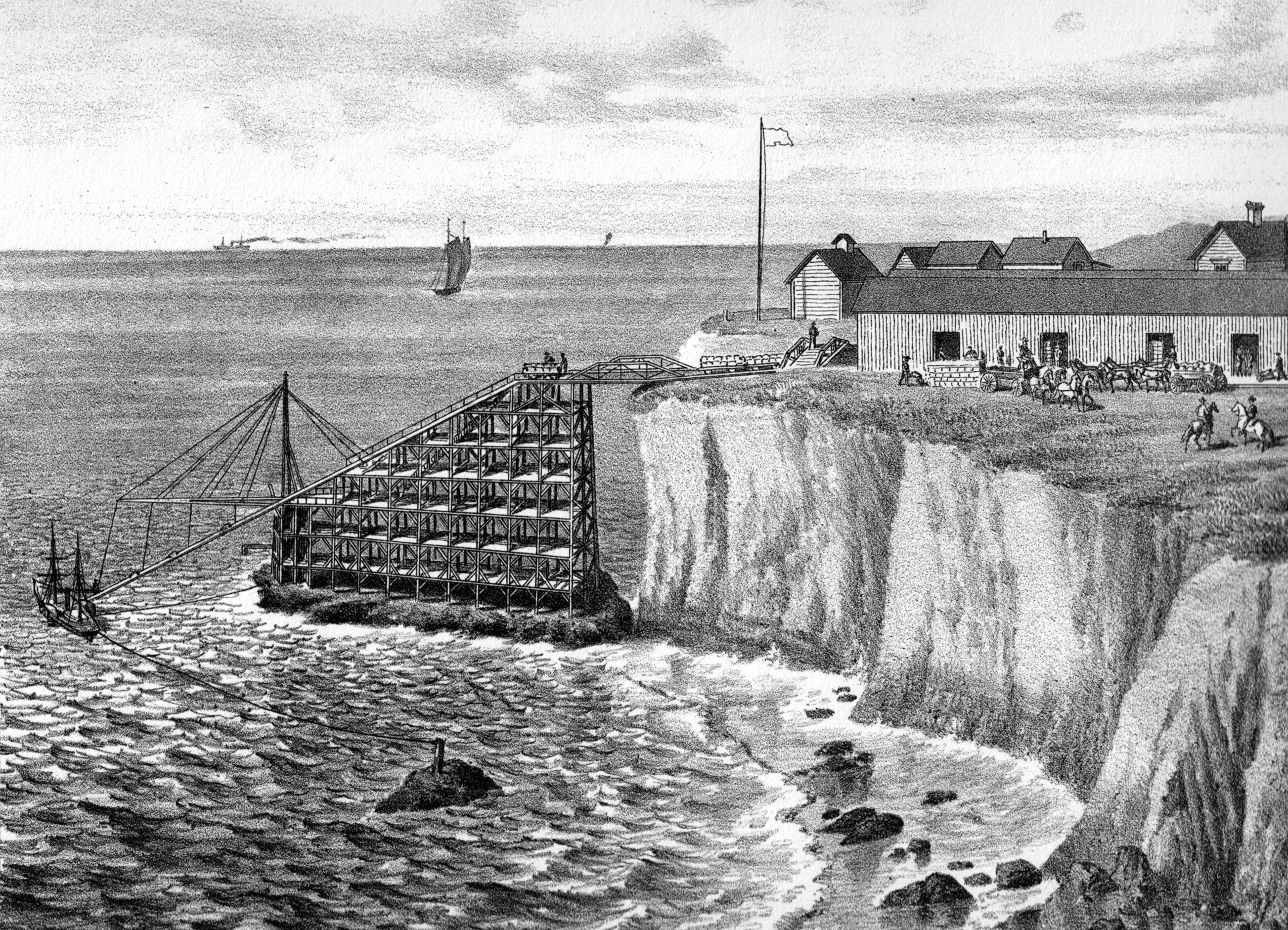
Gordon's Chute, 1878

Tunitas Creek is a 6.6-mile-long (10.6 km) stream in San Mateo County, California. Tunitas is Spanish for "little prickly pears".

== Course ==
The creek rises at an altitude of 1,860 feet (570 m) on Kings Mountain in the Santa Cruz Mountains and flows to the Pacific Ocean at Tunitas Creek Beach. An all-weather paved county road, Tunitas Creek Road, follows its course. Steelhead trout have been found in the creek.

Tunitas Creek Open Space Preserve, owned by Midpeninsula Regional Open Space District, encompasses approximately 2,200 acres (890 ha) along the creek.

== History ==
The first European land exploration of Alta California, the Spanish Portolà expedition, traveled along the coast on its way north, camping near today's San Gregorio, from October 24 to 26, 1769. On the return journey to San Diego, the party camped near Half Moon Bay on November 16, and at Tunitas Creek on November 17. Franciscan missionary Juan Crespi noted in his diary: "This morning broke very cloudy, and as soon as we started on our way it began to rain, and in the whole three leagues [about 7.8 miles (12.6 km)] that we traveled it was falling on us. We halted on the banks of a deep arroyo."

The name "Arroyo de Las Tunitas" appears on the diseños (claim maps) of both Rancho San Gregorio (1839) and Rancho Cañada Verde (1838) because it was part of the boundary between them.

Tunitas Creek Beach is enclosed by 100-foot (30 m) cliffs. The cliffs just north of the creek outflow were the site of "Gordon's Chute", a ramp for sliding farm goods from the top of the cliffs to ships anchored below. Constructed in 1872 by Alexander Gordon, the chute was destroyed by a storm in 1885; eyebolts remain in the cliff-face.

The beach was formerly private, with a house on the cliff top, and was owned from 1998 to 2017 by a trust of musician Chris Isaak. The property, comprising 58 acres (23 ha) was then purchased by the Peninsula Open Space Trust, who transferred it in 2020 to San Mateo County. In 2023, the county approved a project to create a public park, which was scheduled to open in 2024 after construction including creation of trails, parking, restrooms, and a ranger station. To be called Don Horsley County Park at Tunitas Beach, the park required additional construction because of landslides affecting the emergency access route, and is scheduled to open on August 17, 2026.

== Tributaries ==
- Dry Creek
- Rings Gulch
- East Fork Tunitas Creek
- Mitchell Creek

== See also ==
- List of watercourses in the San Francisco Bay Area
