= Frenchman's Tower =

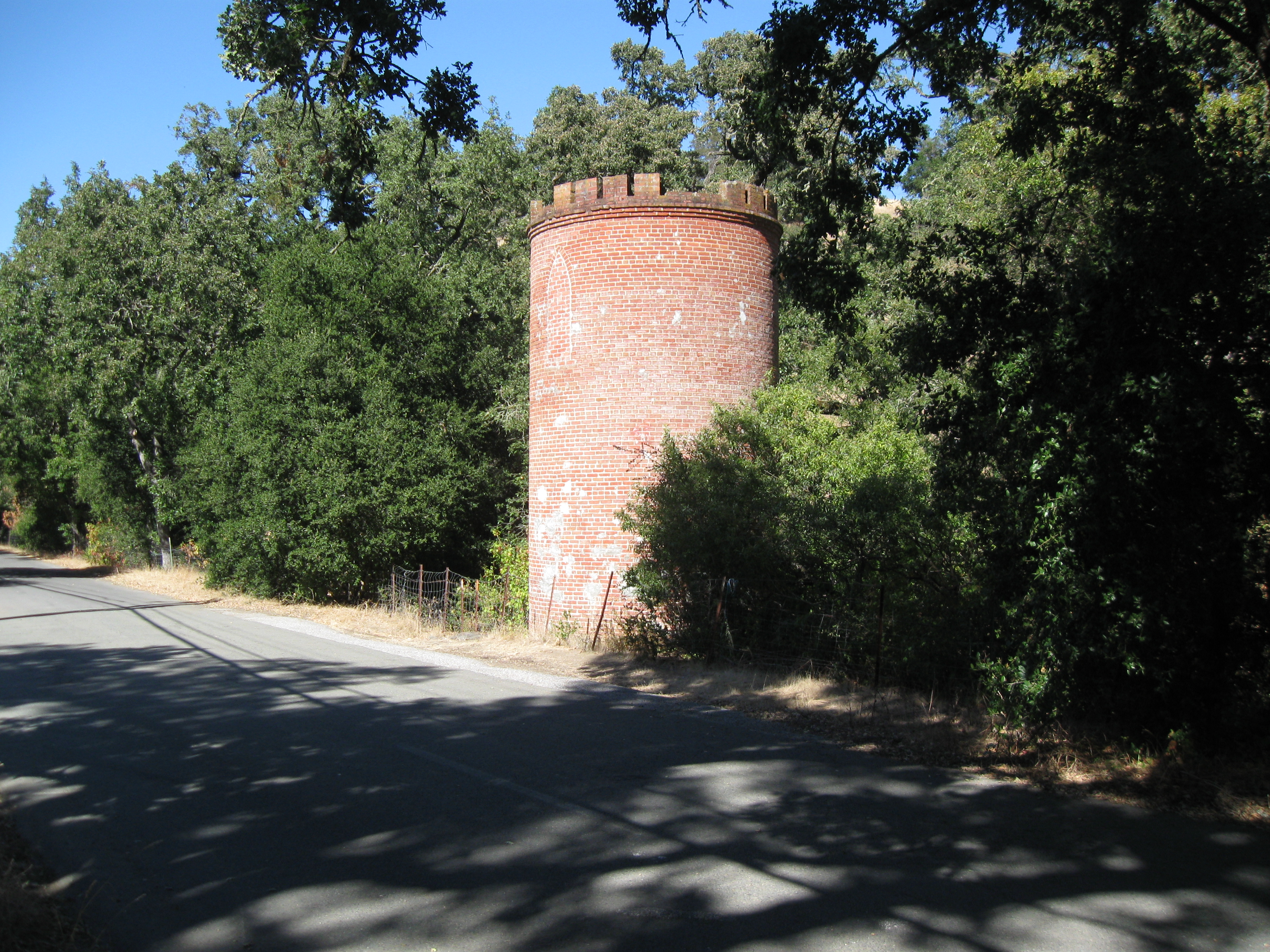
- Frenchman's Tower on Old Page Mill Road

- Location within San Francisco Bay Area Location within California Location within the United States

General information
- Status: Completed
- Type: Water tower
- Architectural style: Gothic Revival
- Location: San Francisco peninsula, 2065 Old Page Mill Road, Palo Alto, California, Palo Alto, United States
- Coordinates: 37.396132°N 122.161895°W
- Elevation: 200 ft (61 m)
- Completed: 1875
- Owner: Stanford University

Height
- Height: 32 ft (9.8 m)

Dimensions
- Diameter: 15 ft (4.6 m)

Technical details
- Structural system: Brick Masonry
- Floor count: 2

Design and construction
- Architect: Paulin Caperon (aka Peter Coutts)
- Designations: California Point of Historical Interest

Frenchman's Tower is a two-story red brick structure located in Santa Clara County, California, that resembles a medieval fortification. Built in 1875, the structure was listed as a California Point of Historical Interest in 1969.

The structure was built under the direction of land owner Paulin Caperon, a native of France who had assumed the name Peter Coutts when he moved to Mayfield, California in 1875. Coutts returned to France in 1882 without letting his California neighbors know what happened to him and ordered a bank to liquidate his Mayfield property.

Since then trespassers have carved names or initials into almost every brick of the tower within their reach. Some dates go back over 100 years. In 1970, the landowner bricked in the windows to protect the structure from vandals. Frenchman's Tower stands on Old Page Mill Road, midway between Foothill Expressway and Interstate 280, in Santa Clara County, California, within a strip of land within the borders of Palo Alto on land now owned by Stanford University.

== Architecture ==
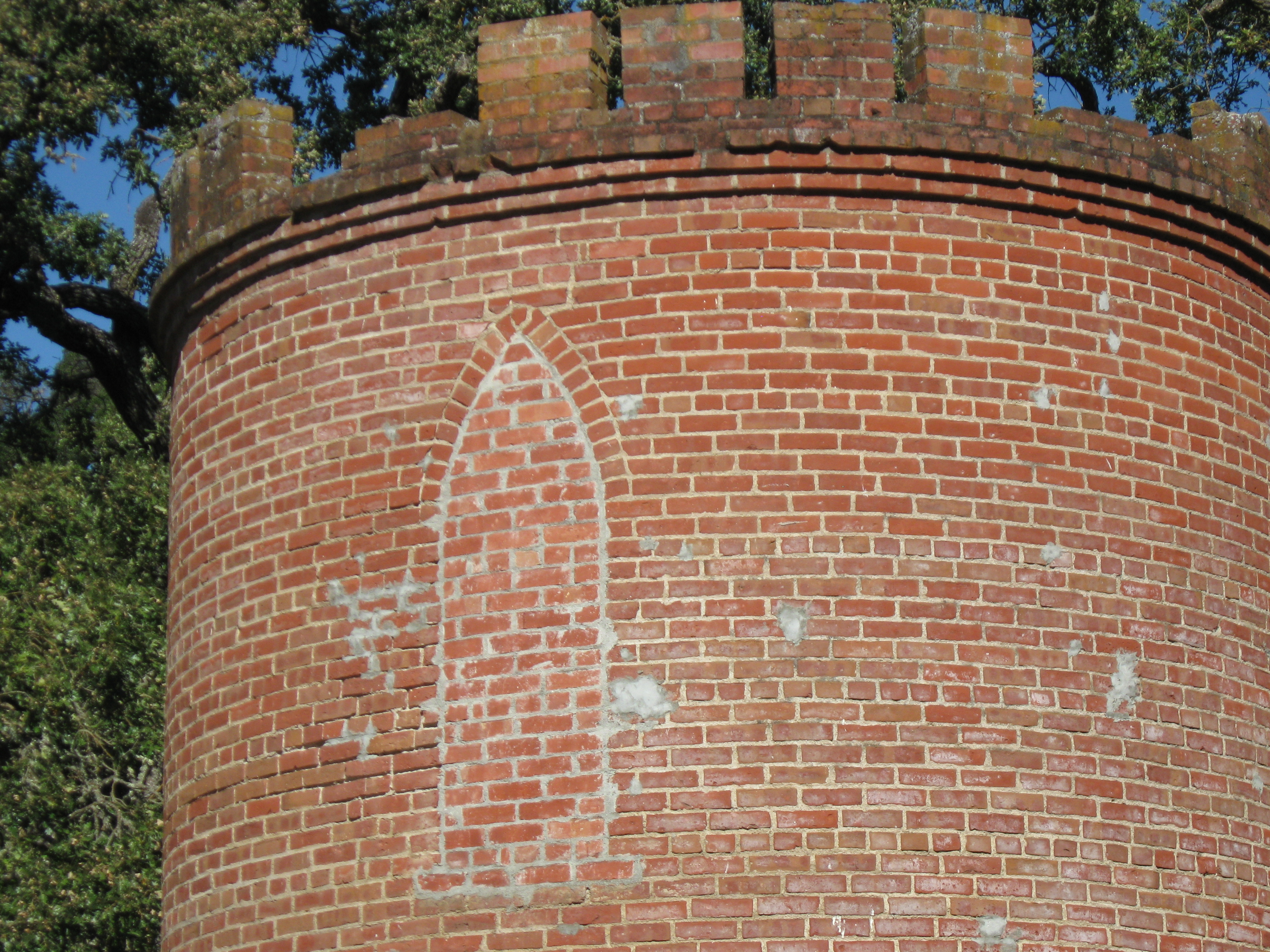
Gothic windows and simulated Battlements on Frenchman's Tower

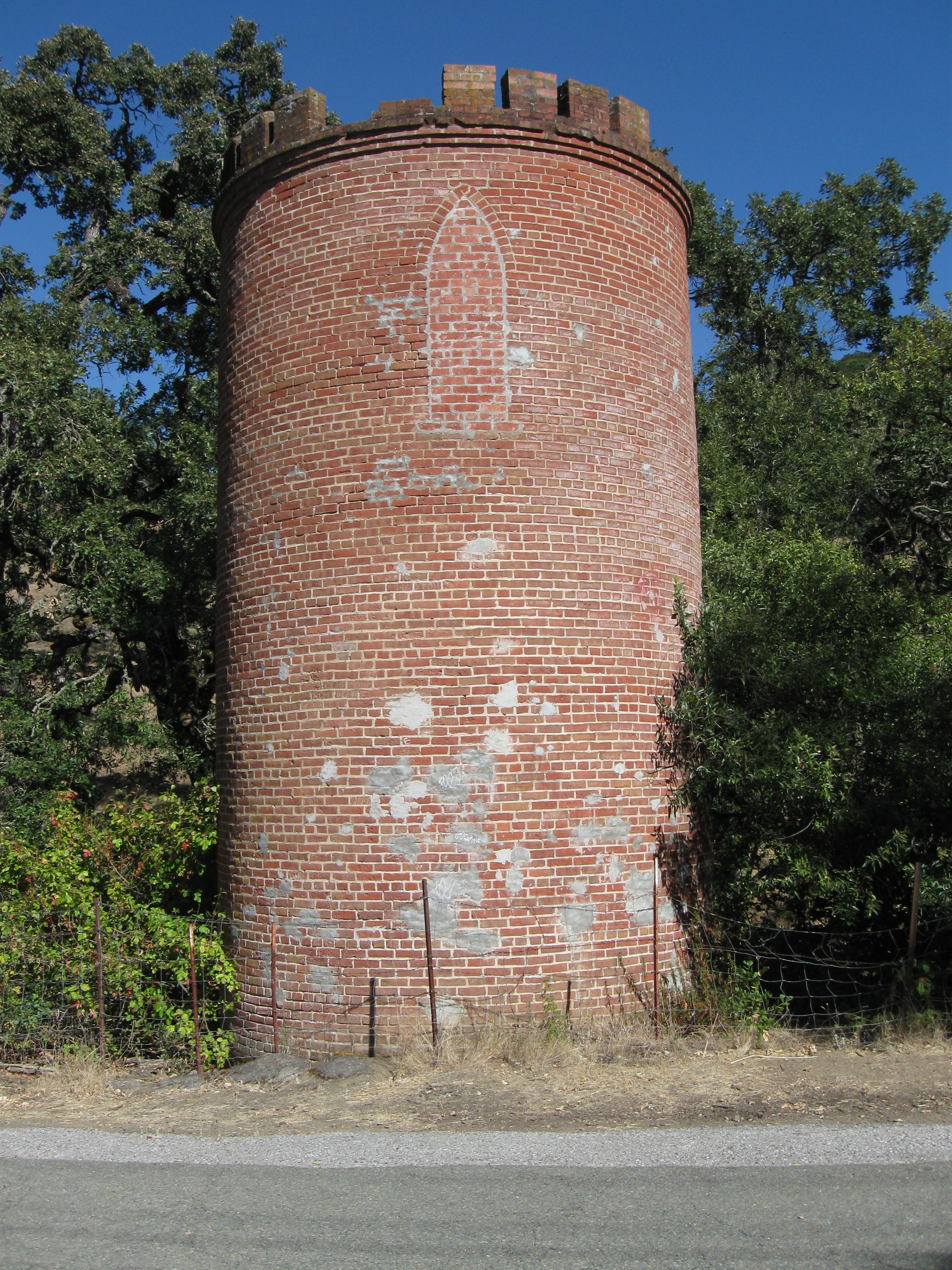
Frenchman's Tower built in 1875

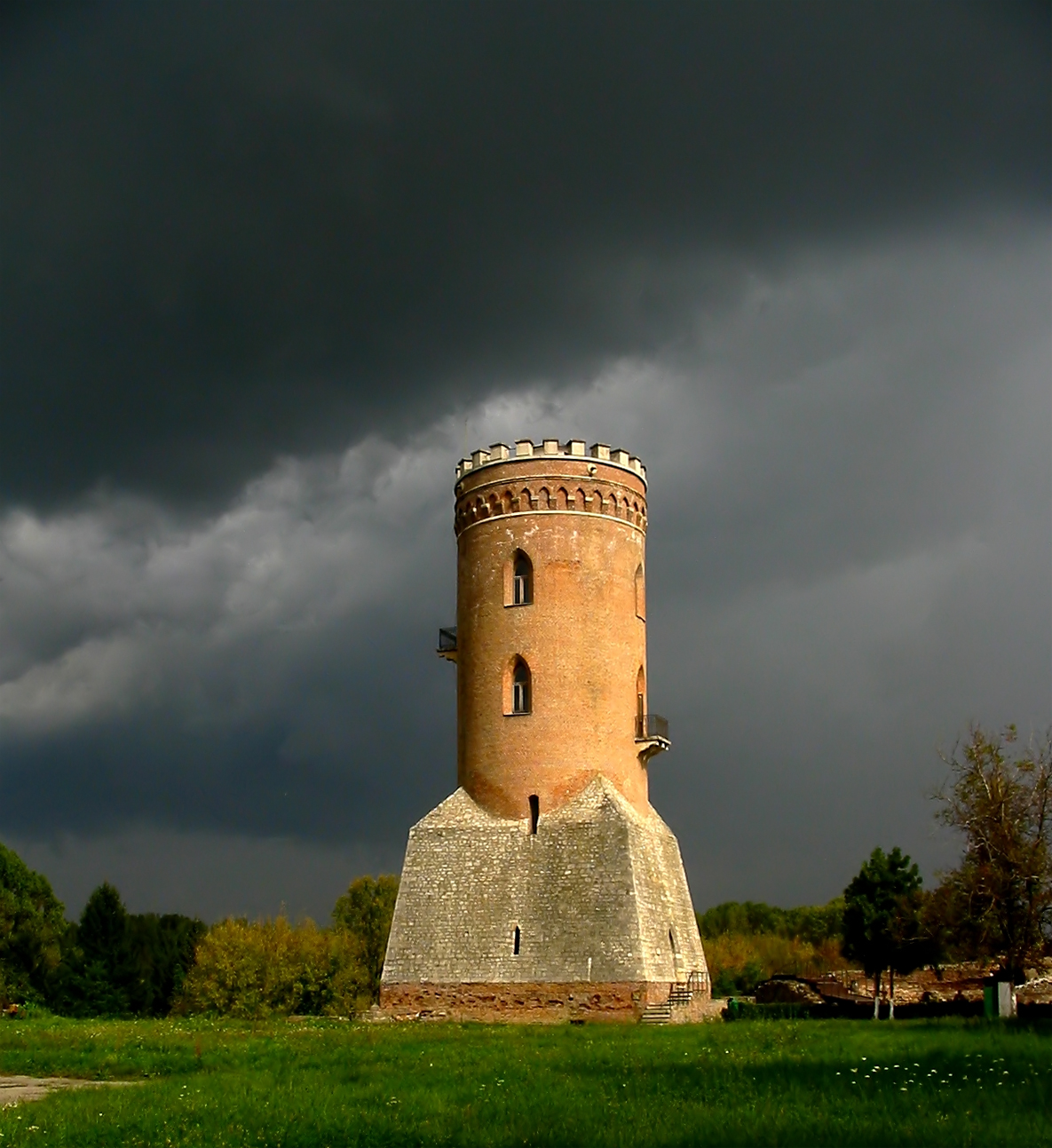
Chindia Tower built between the 15th and 19th century

Frenchman's Tower was built in 1875 and has miniature crenels along the top and Gothic windows, giving it a style similar to Medieval fortifications built hundreds of years earlier, not unlike Chindia Tower built between the 15th and 19th century. In the Middle Ages, crenels were used to shield archers defending the structure.

The second floor held a water tank, while the first floor was used as a library. The original owner, Paulin Caperon, spent many hours in his library reading and studying. The building never had any doors, requiring entry through a window.

The tower, situated near Matadero Creek, was originally connected to one of six tunnels used to provide subterranean water to his farm and to his lake. Workers had to remove tons of earth before reaching a sufficient underground water source. Bricks for the tower were made by Albert Bowman and Company from a clay deposit discovered in Mountain View in the same year that the tower was constructed.

== Public interest and notability ==
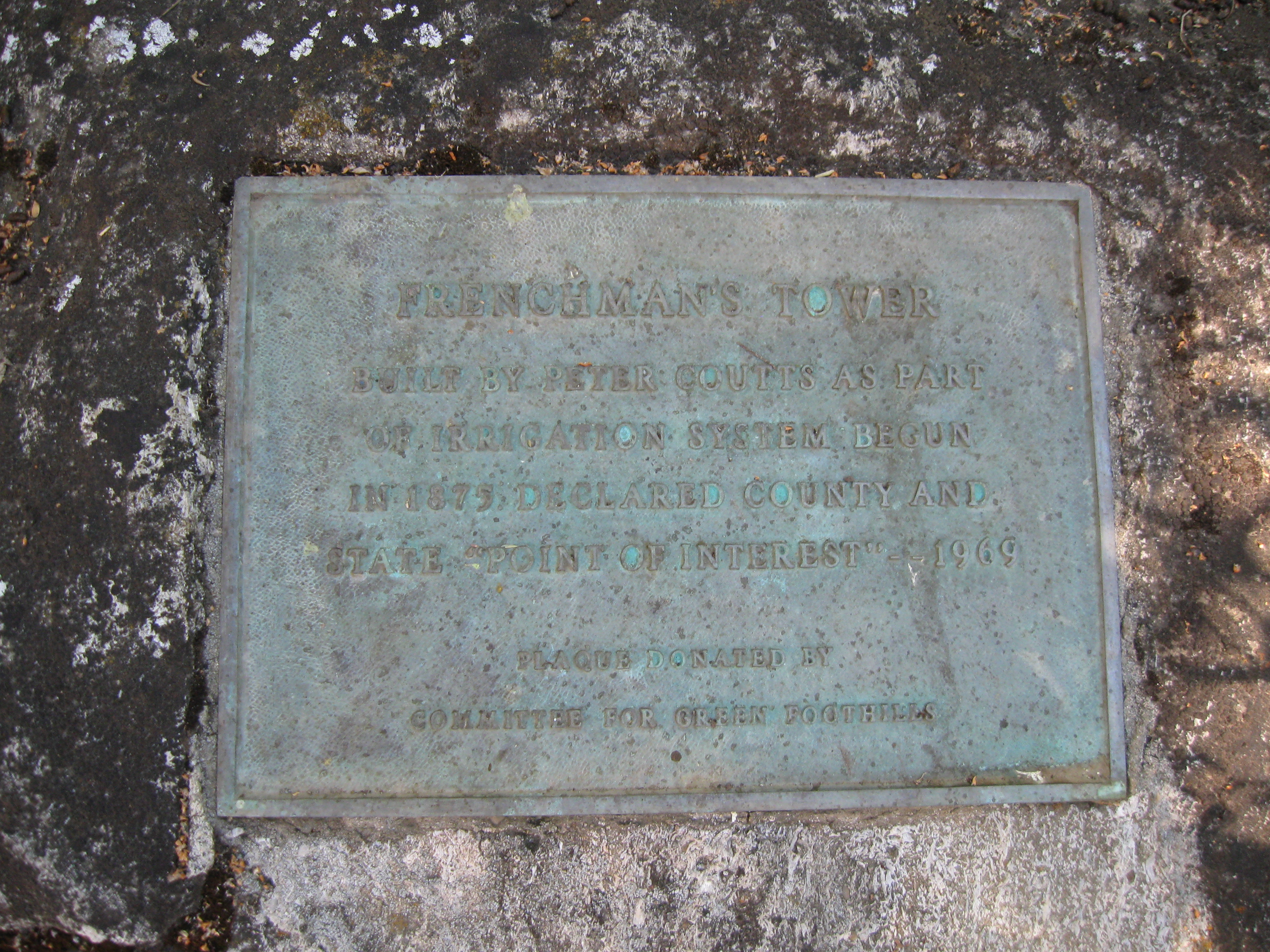
Plaque next to Frenchman's Tower

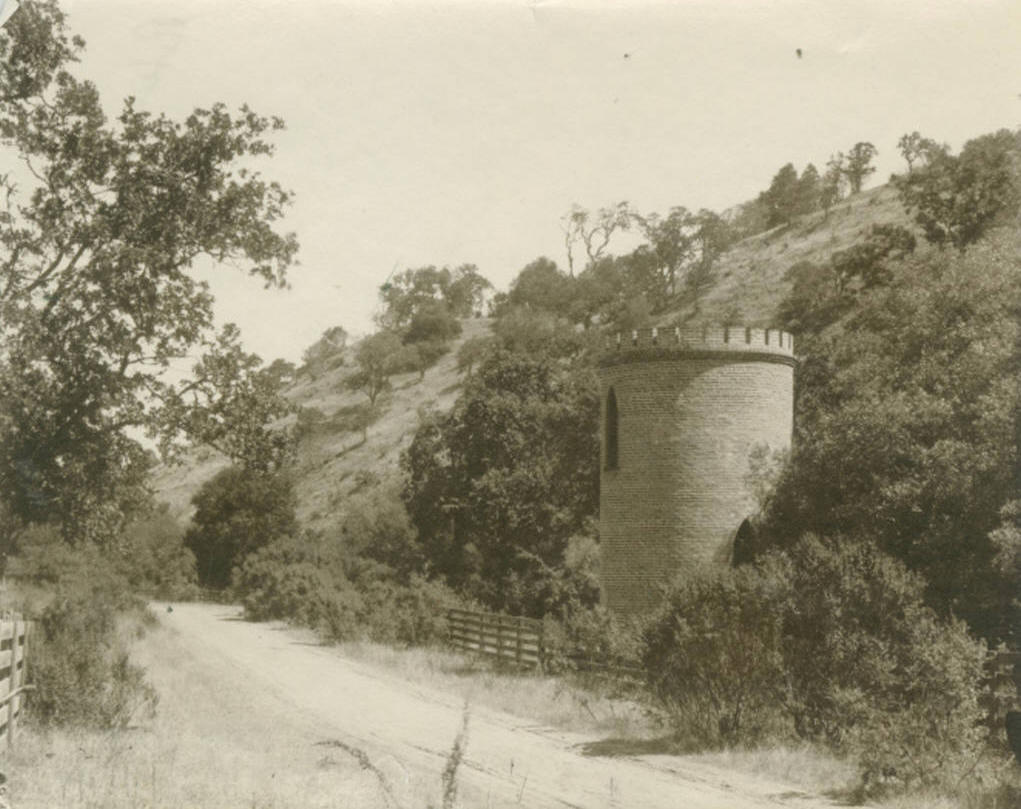
Frenchman's Tower 1910-1930 photo in San Jose Public Library

Over the years, many different ideas and stories regarding Paulin Caperon's tower and tunnels have been told. Caperon, who also went by the alias Peter Coutts, is said to have "enjoyed mystifying his neighbors" and often helped perpetuate these stories by neither denying nor confirming the fanciful tales. These include the construction of tunnels and a fortified tower to "withstand a siege by his enemies" and harboring the French Empress, neither of which were true.

=== Recognition ===
- Registered as California Point of Historical Interest November 3, 1969.
- Listed on the Santa Clara County Heritage Resource Inventory.
- The Library of Congress archives contain photos of Frenchman's Tower taken during August and September 1975.
- A 1910-1930 photo shown on the right is in the San Jose Public Library.
- Words cast into a bronze plaque on a monument next to the base say, "Frenchman's TowerBuilt by Peter Coutts as part of irrigation system begun in 1875. Declared county and state "point of interest"—1969. Plaque donated by Committee for Green Foothills."

=== Popular news media ===
Popular news media of today sometimes casts the tower as an unsolved mystery.

- In a March 2011, CBS news reporter Ken Bastida interviewed local historian Steve Staiger. Staiger said he did not believe the structure was constructed as a water tower as the builder alleged because the tower was too far away from water or the rest of his property. Staiger offers a reward to anyone who solves the mystery. The TV report shows an entry-hole vandals chopped through the bricks on the back side of the tower.

=== Historical articles ===
- Peninsula Life Magazine published a 1948 article describing how Frenchman's Tower "standing stark and alone" on the banks of Matadero Creek is one of the Peninsula's most famous landmarks. The article goes on to tell the story of Paulin Caperon through interviews with family members.
- The California Historical Society began a 1954 article with the sentence, "No tale in California history has had stranger diversities than the one about the man who sold to Leland Stanford the land on which he built his university." The article continues with information based upon interviews with surviving members of Coutts's family and household, explaining the reason for Peter Coutts's strange behavior.
- Although not referencing sources, the Stanford Historical Society published a 1981 article, "Coutts was no eccentric, history study shows", detailing the life of Paulin Caperon. The article provides explanations for many of his seemingly strange actions.

=== Public curiosity ===
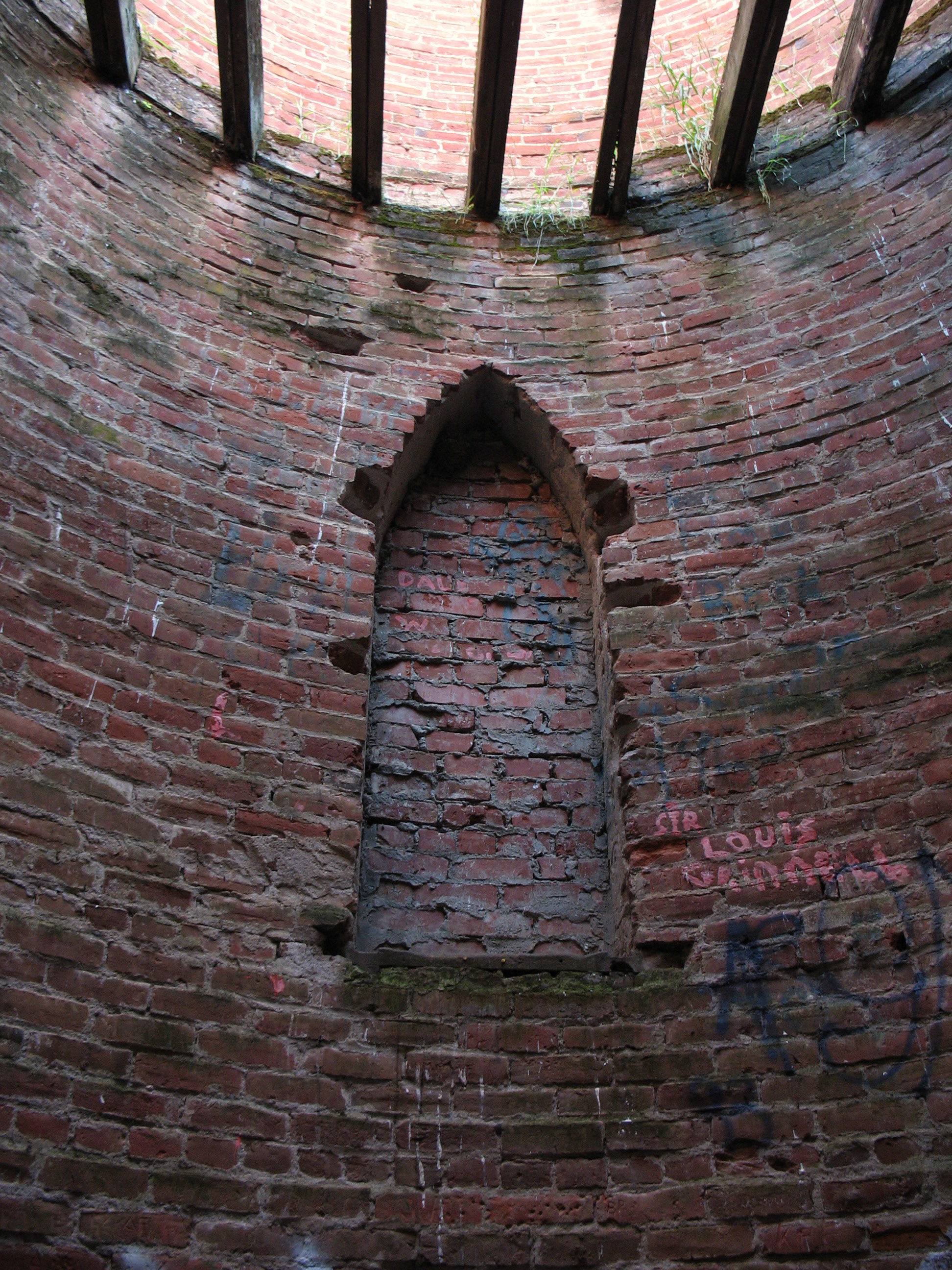
Inside Frenchman's Tower

Some articles show the writer's curiosity about the tower.

- In a 2010 article, Examiner reporter William Baeck described how he climbed over a wire fence and crawled past poison oak. Then he held his camera inside the tower and began photographing.
- In 2006 photographer Eric Chan took photos of the tower, including photos documenting his presence both outside and inside the tower. He described how he climbed through a small hole in the back and found it "pretty scary inside". The photo on the right, showing the inside of the structure, is one of many he posted on Flickr.

=== Official concerns ===
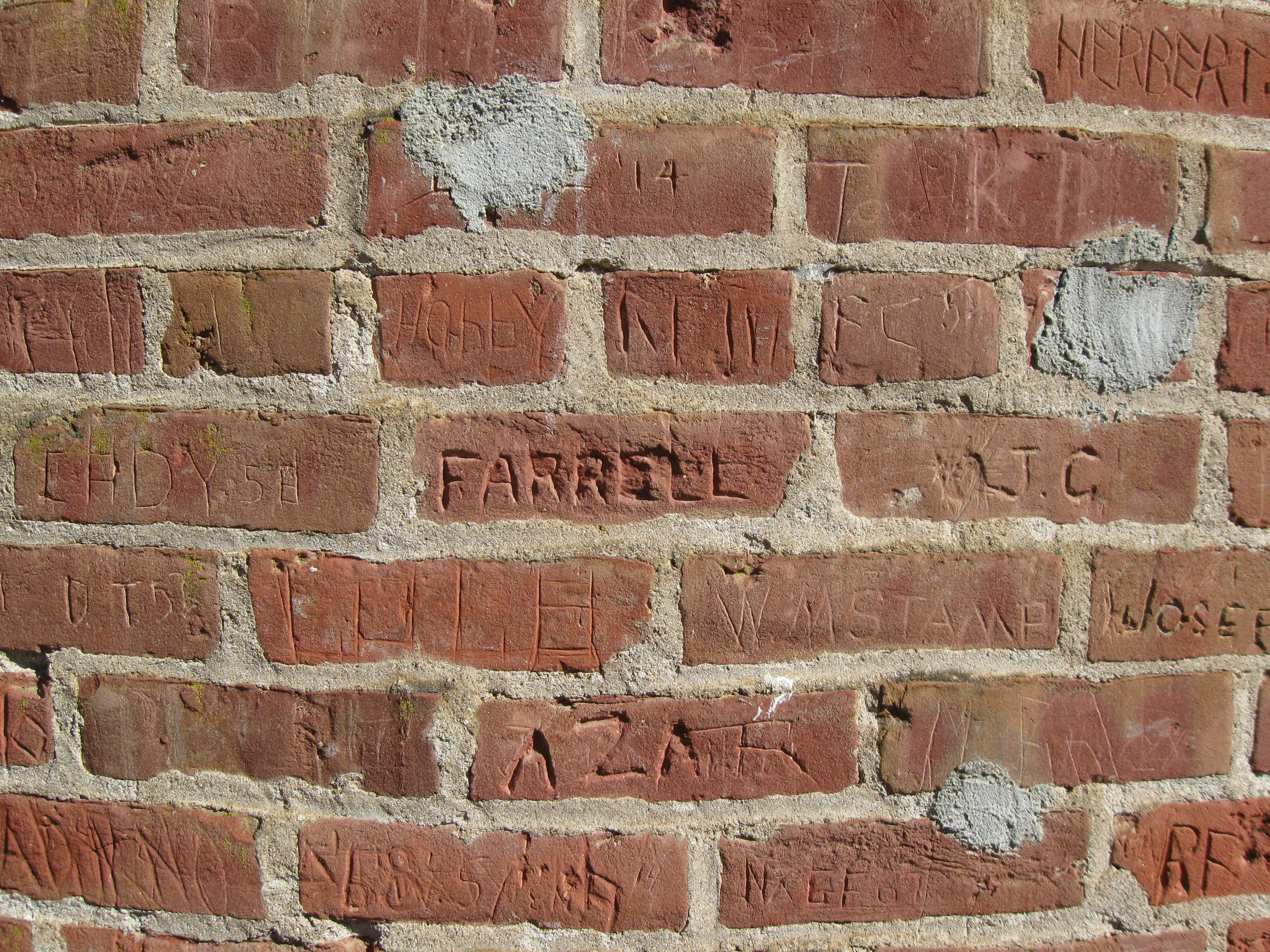
Damage caused by names being carved into bricks on Frenchman's Tower

- A 2004 environmental impact report on trail alignment expressed concerns that proposed trail segment AD05 would attract more visitors, possibly leading to the tower being further vandalized. The report also stated that more bike and foot traffic might make the tower more visible, possibly protecting the tower. To mitigate the risk, the landowner agreed to inspect the tower every six months and to take action upon discovery of further damage.

== Paulin Caperon ==
Jean-Baptiste Paulin Caperon was born of wealthy parents near Bordeaux France in 1822 and died in Bordeaux, France, in September 1889 at the age of sixty-seven.

Paulin Caperon was the son of one of Napoleon's officers. He lost both parents when he was only 26 years old. He "openly criticized Napoleon III policies and opposed the Franco-Prussian War." He founded a private bank, which he sold in 1873. Because of problems in France, he left France for Brussels, Belgium, and then went to New Orleans using identity papers of his deceased cousin Peter Coutts. He traveled to San Francisco and then to the township of Mayfield. Paulin Caperon continued using the name Peter Coutts when he arrived in Mayfield (present day Palo Alto).

In 1875 he bought 1,400 acres (4.7 km2) of Rancho Rincon de San Francisquito from Jeremiah Clarke for $90,000. Caperon had a heart ailment, and his wife was an invalid. He felt concerned that he and his wife might both die, and his children might have difficulty inheriting his estate, so he took title to the land in the name of his children's governess Eugene Cloyensen.

Bridge built on Caperon's land. The area is now a park and Stanford faculty housing.

Caperon developed the land into a thriving stock farm and eventually directed the construction of a tower to distribute water. He seemed friendly but would not discuss his past. When local residents discovered that Peter Coutts (Paulin Caperon) had actually purchased the land in the name of his children's governess, the townspeople grew suspicious, made speculations, and spread rumors about the intended purpose of the tower. In 1882, only eight years after his arrival, Paulin Caperon suddenly returned to his native France and sold the land for the sum of $140,000 to Leland Stanford, who founded Stanford University in 1891.

Paulin Caperon eventually reacquired legal title to valuable property he had owned in France. "Using his true identity, Caperon and his family returned to Paris in May 1883," and he spent the remaining six years of his life in France.

== See also ==
- Palo Alto, California
- Leland Stanford
- Battlement
- Rancho Rincon de San Francisquito
- Franco-Prussian War
