= Cipher Hunt =

Scavenger hunt based on Gravity Falls

- Date: July 20 – August 2, 2016
- Location: Japan; Russia; United States
- Type: Alternate reality game, Scavenger hunt
- Organised by: Alex Hirsch
- Outcome: Statue of Bill Cipher was found in a Reedsport, Oregon forest. It was later removed and temporarily placed at Reedsport's Bicentennial Park, before being permanently relocated to Confusion Hill in Piercy, California.

The Cipher Hunt was an alternate reality game and international scavenger hunt created by Alex Hirsch based on his animated series Gravity Falls. The goal was to find the real-life statue of the series' antagonist Bill Cipher, which was briefly glimpsed at the end of the series finale. The hunt involved retrieving and decoding clues hidden in various locations worldwide.

The Cipher Hunt began on July 20, 2016, in Saint Petersburg, Russia, and concluded on August 2, 2016, in a forest in Reedsport, Oregon, where the statue was found. The statue was later taken by local authorities because of a property dispute and was temporarily displayed at Bicentennial Park in Reedsport before it was relocated permanently to Confusion Hill, a roadside attraction in Piercy, California, more precisely to coordinates 39.919002N 123.764908W.

== Creation ==
In the Gravity Falls behind-the-scenes documentary One Crazy Summer, included in the collector's edition DVD box set for the show, series creator Alex Hirsch discussed the origins of the Cipher Hunt. Hirsch expresses in the documentary that he wanted to give the fans one final mystery none were expecting, in tune with the show's theme. He came up with the idea of a global treasure hunt for a real-life Bill Cipher statue, and recruited the show's art director Ian Worrel to help with planning the hunt and its locations.

Fon Davis, a movie prop master and friend of Hirsch, was enlisted to design and build Bill Cipher's statue out of plexiglass, which is durable against the elements. They rubbed glue with seeds inside it so the statue would grow moss and look more aged. Hirsch then took a trip to Reedsport, Oregon and found a woman willing to let him install a statue on her property for people to hunt down. They then drove the statue up to Reedsport, installed the statue there, and recorded a few seconds of footage of it for the end of Gravity Falls' series finale, "Weirdmageddon 3: Take Back the Falls". After the finale aired on Disney XD on February 15, 2016, Hirsch took a trip to a couple of conventions and vacation spots, and he would secretly leave behind a clue for the hunt at every place he visited.

== The hunt ==
=== Setup ===
Following the airing of the series finale, fans began speculating about the existence of a statue of Bill Cipher in the real world based on the footage. An encoded riddle in the episode also hinted at the presence of buried treasure "deep within the woods" and a statue "beyond the rusty gates". There was no official mention of the statue until the show's creator Hirsch tweeted a teaser announcement followed by an image containing cryptograms and clues. One decoded cryptogram revealed the hashtag "#CipherHunt", while other imagery in the tweet indicated a Bill Cipher statue surrounded by trees with branches and knots, as well as architectural plans to the location of the first clue. Part of the image was ripped away.

Hirsch immediately clarified on Twitter, that the hunt was being done out of his own volition and funding and without any affiliation to The Walt Disney Company, which owns the rights to Gravity Falls. He asked fans to be careful and to avoid trespassing or vandalizing the public areas the clues were in. Fans used social media outlets such as Twitter, Tumblr, Periscope, and Reddit to communicate and share their findings.

=== First clue: Saint Petersburg, Russia ===
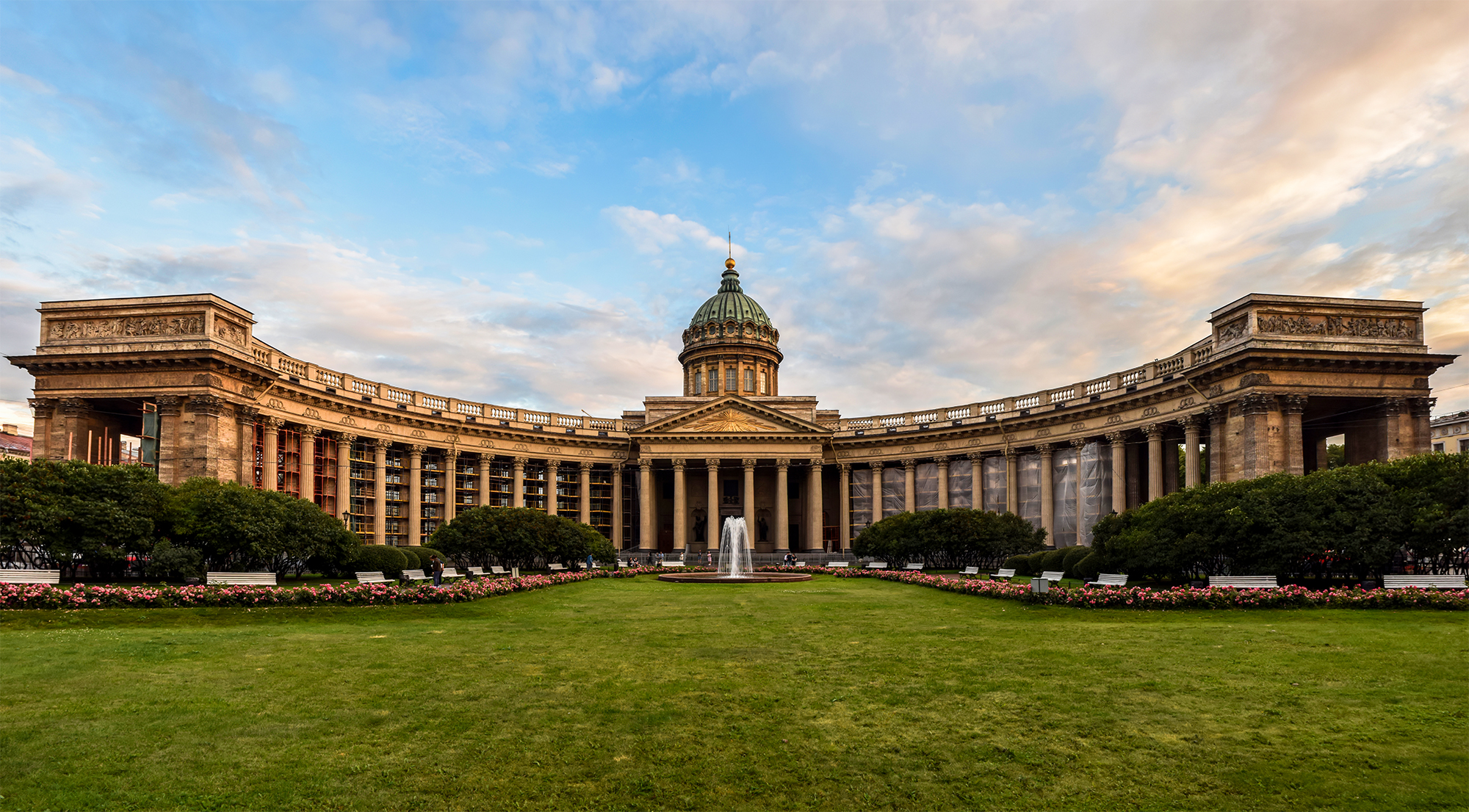
The Kazan Cathedral in Saint Petersburg, the location of the first clue.

After the hunt's announcement, the location of the hunt's first clue was hinted to be in Russia, after the series of red letters printed in the tweeted image was decoded using a −3 Caesar cipher and an Atbash cipher creating the country's name, which Hirsch visited for a convention in April 2016. Russian fans of the show recognized the diagram at the middle left of the image as an architectural plan of the Kazan Cathedral in Saint Petersburg. Using a diagram at the middle right of the image which showed the first clue's exact location inside the cathedral, it was successfully found.

=== Second clue: Tokyo, Japan ===
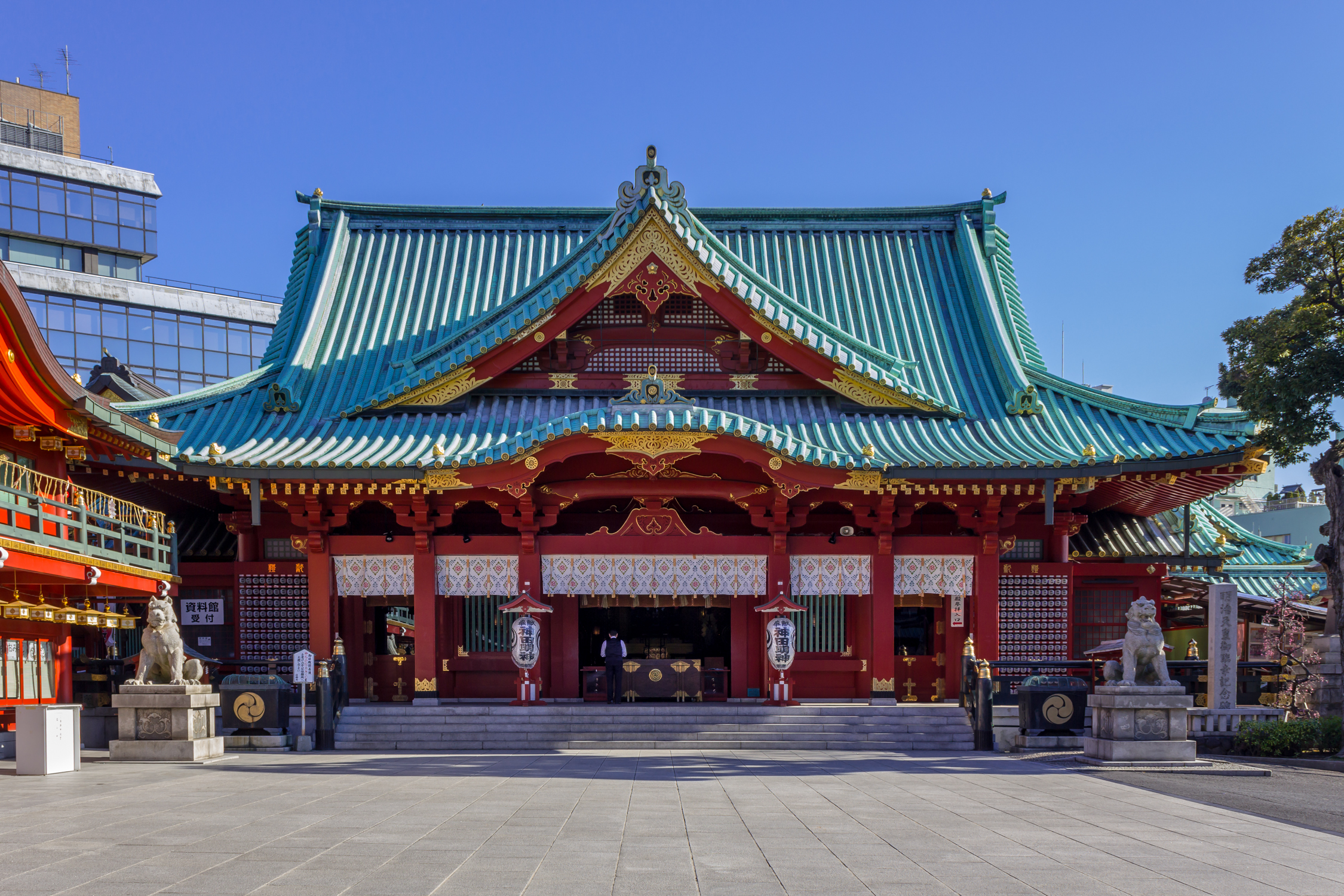
The Kanda Shrine in Chiyoda, Tokyo, the location of the second clue.

After the text on the first clue was decoded, it pointed to the second clue being located in Japan as the text mentioned a "shrine" and "yen", the latter of which is the country's official currency. The text also mentioned a "sword" and "crescent" marking the clue. The second clue was located at the Kanda Shrine in Chiyoda, Tokyo, which Hirsch and his partner Dana Terrace visited during their trip to the country in February 2016. The clue was written on the back of one of the emas in the shrine with a drawing of a scimitar and crescent, along with an encrypted message.

=== Third clue: Atlanta, Georgia ===
The decoded text on the second clue pointed to the next clue being in the United States at 400 Ponce de Leon Avenue NE in Atlanta, Georgia as the second clue contained the words "...the hunter of the fountain of youth. 400 before his name is written...", with the first phrase describing the avenue's namesake, Spanish explorer Juan Ponce de León. The address found led to a Shriners' temple. The text on the second clue also mentioned finding something "LOST". This led community streamers to find a lost poster for Waddles, Mabel Pines's pet pig, in the area, which was water damaged and difficult to read. The poster contained a picture of and information about Waddles, a cryptogram, and a phone number to call if Waddles was found. When called, the phone number plays a backwards message, which, when reversed, played a message from one of the show's main characters, Grunkle Stan, with the theme song for the science fiction television series The X-Files playing in the background.

=== Fourth and fifth clue: Los Angeles, California ===
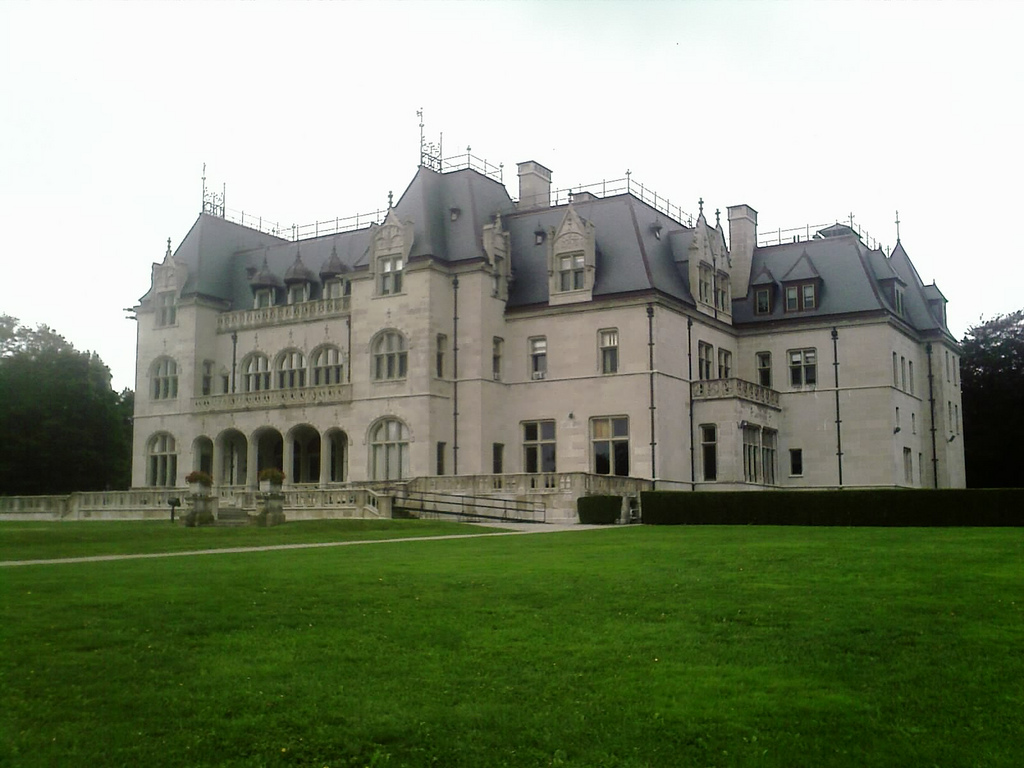
Ochre Court in Newport, Rhode Island, the location of the original fourth clue

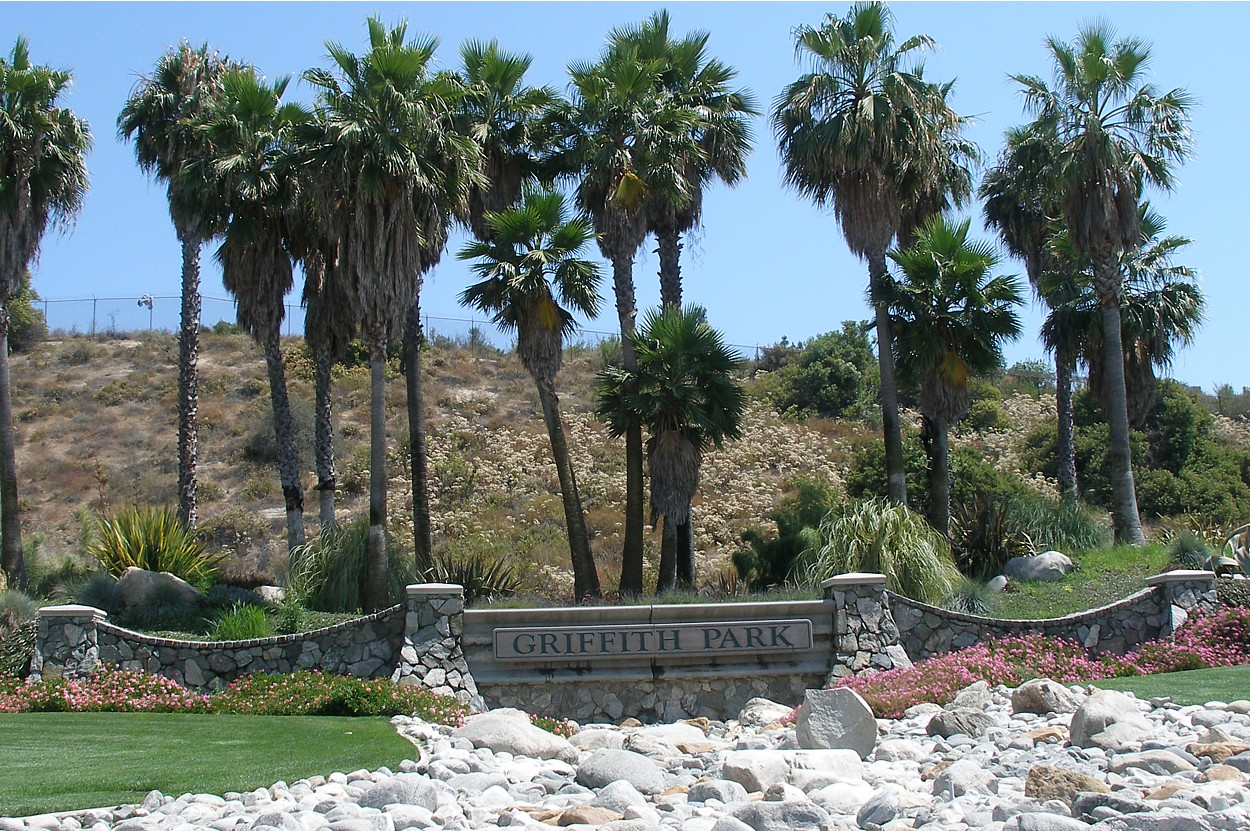
Griffith Park in Los Angeles, the location of the new fourth clue

The recorded phone message revealed that the fourth clue's location was in the Ochre Court building of Salve Regina University in Newport, Rhode Island. The clue was supposed to be located behind a portrait of Mary Hilda Miley, the university's second president. However, the university accidentally disposed of the clue before the hunt began. Hirsch then promised to give a replacement clue and asked fans to stay out of the university in the meantime.

On July 21, 2016, at 12:30pm PST, Hirsch tweeted a phone number, the same one on Waddles' missing poster in Atlanta. When called, the phone number played a new message from Grunkle Stan, which revealed that the next clue was located near the statue of Griffith J. Griffith at Griffith Park in the Los Feliz neighborhood of Los Angeles, California. A golden head of Grunkle Stan was found with an encoded message written in invisible ink on three sheets of paper, as well as an invisible ink pen to read the message.

The decoded text from the fourth clue showed that the fifth clue was located in Century City, another neighborhood in Los Angeles, at a park between the Century Plaza Towers and the Creative Artists Agency building, notably trimmed into the shape of the Eye of Providence. Fans were joined by Gravity Falls cast member Jason Ritter and Alex Hirsch's twin sister, Ariel Hirsch, in the hunt. A black pouch was found containing a USB stick with a drawing of Bill Cipher on it. The USB stick contained an audio file that was later uploaded to SoundCloud. The recording featured Grunkle Stan being taunted by the ghost of Sister Mary Hilda Miley (a reference to the lost clue at Salve Regina University) about not finding the treasure, with music and sound effects from the 1990 video game Super Mario World in the background.

=== Sixth clue: Santa Clarita, California ===
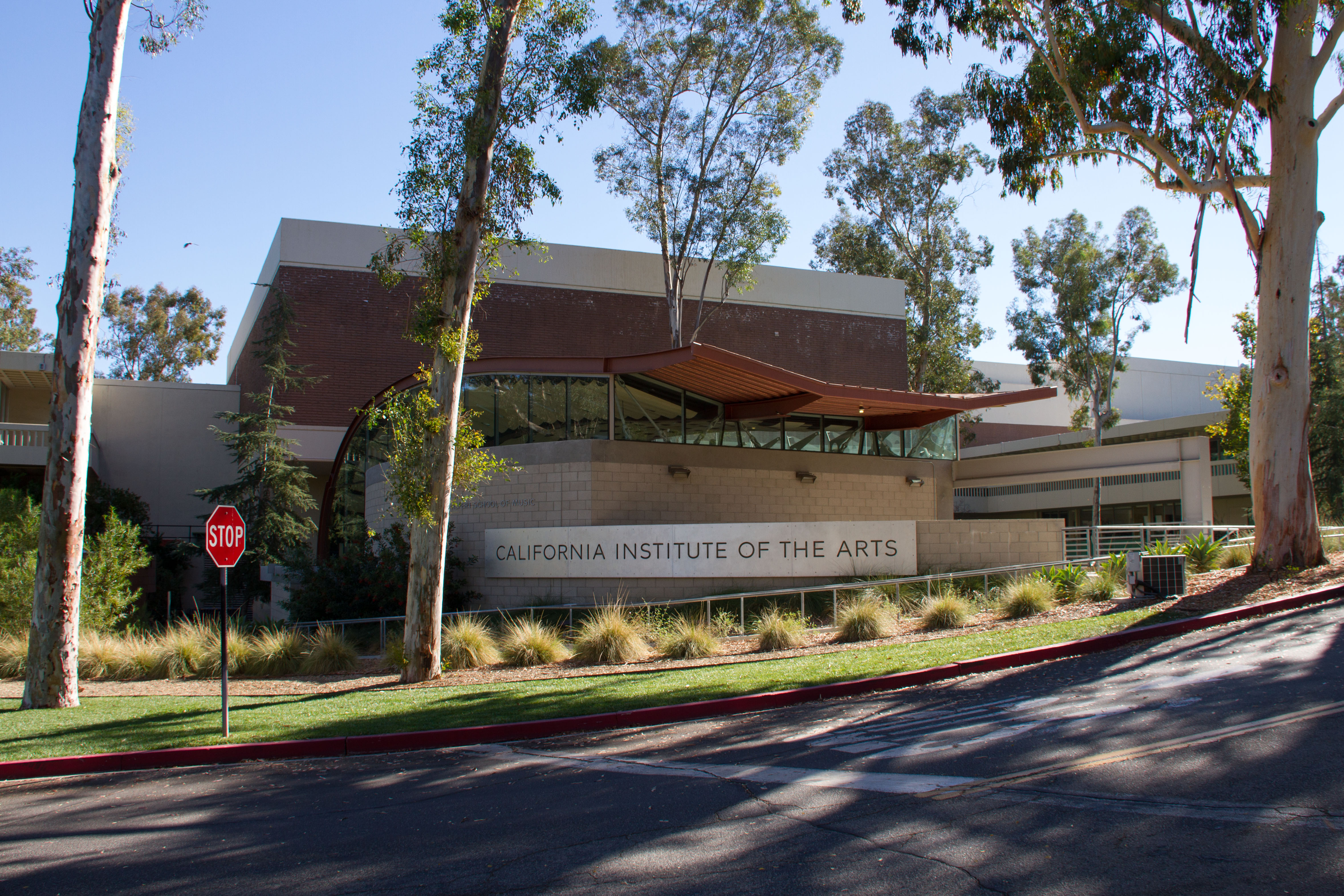
The California Institute of the Arts in Santa Clarita, California, where the California State Summer School for the Arts, the location of the sixth clue, is based.

The fifth clue explicitly revealed the sixth clue's location, which was at the campus of the California State Summer School for the Arts, located inside Hirsch's alma mater, the California Institute of the Arts in Santa Clarita, California. It also said that the clue can only be accessed by students of the campus. The sixth clue was accidentally discovered by a student in the campus' sublevel in the form of a graffiti on a wall a week before the Cipher Hunt began. The graffiti shows a crudely drawn Bill Cipher and a series of hexadecimal to decimal codes.

=== Seventh clue: Piedmont, California ===
The decoded hex codes from the sixth clue form co-ordinates that led to Piedmont, California, the hometown of both the Pines and Hirsch twins. The cryptogram on the Waddles missing poster found in Atlanta, as well as some guidance from Hirsch, led fans to a pink key tied to a tree stump in Piedmont Park, in addition to a small chest with a cryptex locked behind a five-letter keyword. The keyword used to open the cryptex was "PINES", which can be found on the banner above the Bill Cipher statue on the initial Cipher Hunt image tweeted by Hirsch.

=== Eighth clue: Los Angeles, California ===
Using the keyword from the original image, the cryptex from the seventh clue was opened, revealing another key and the next clue, which showed that the eighth clue was located at a USPS post office at 1825 N Vermont Avenue in Los Angeles, California and the provided key was to be used to open a PO box that contained the eighth clue.

After an eight-hour drive, the person with the key made it to the PO box and used the key to open it. The eighth clue was a plastic bag containing two thousand jigsaw puzzle pieces, a note with Bill Cipher drawn on it, that when decoded translates to "I HOPE YOU LIKE PUZZLES!", and 37 fake dollars (known as Stan Bucks) which included the word "FILBRICK" written on the back of each one in invisible ink. The fans almost immediately got stuck on the puzzle. At first, fans took the puzzle to the nearby House of Pies to work on. After the restaurant closed for the night, a small group of fans took it to someone's house to continue working on it over night. In the following days, the puzzle was brought to public places like local comic book shops so that anyone could come work on it. Jason Ritter and Scott Jones also showed up to help work on the puzzle. After two days, during which some took sleep shifts while some did not sleep at all, they managed to complete scattered portions of it that show what the puzzle contained. It was of Bill Cipher, with a gnome under him and letters in Bill's cryptogram below and to the sides of him.

After another day, Hirsch tweeted an image which showed a rough idea of what the completed puzzle should look like, but with a different code that translated to "THIS IS WHERE THE CLUE WILL APPEAR". After two more days, Hirsch tweeted two images of different coded sections of the puzzle. Fans used Adobe Photoshop to piece these two images together and then decoded what they could make out. Additionally, a virtual version of the puzzle was created and uploaded to the internet by fans working on the physical puzzle to get some help. Within a few hours, the coded message on the puzzle was then digitally solved by a group effort of fans working together online.

=== Ninth clue: Portland, Oregon ===
While progress on the puzzle was still ongoing, a fan discovered the next clue by complete accident. He was walking on the corner of Rodney Avenue and Tillamook Street in Portland, Oregon where he spotted a lawn gnome. Having been keeping up with the hunt on Twitter and knowing that the puzzle contained a small image of a lawn gnome, he decided to pick up the gnome on a whim only to find a View-Master and the ninth clue written on a crumpled up piece of paper underneath it.

Though the clue was found without completing the puzzle, Hirsch provided an incentive to those who are in the process of completing both the physical and virtual puzzles by saying that if the physical puzzle got finished, he would release the unaired pilot episode of Gravity Falls made in 2010 and if the virtual puzzle got finished, he would upload unreleased cut scenes from the show. The physical puzzle was completed on August 1. Hirsch showed up upon its completion, signed it and promised the release of the original pilot.

=== Tenth clue: Piercy, California ===
The View-Master from the ninth clue contained slides depicting the area around Confusion Hill in Piercy, California, a tourist trap similar to the Mystery Shack, Grunkle Stan's business in the series. One of the slides also contains an image of Snoqualmie Falls in Washington, a waterfall known for appearing in the television series Twin Peaks, an inspiration to Gravity Falls. This pointed to the tenth clue being located at Confusion Hill.

The ninth clue mentioned a "gift shop" and using a "password" to buy an "eyeball jar". A group of fans went to Confusion Hill early in the morning, but had to wait around for it to open. After they got in, they discovered a jar containing fake eyeballs in the gift shop which was located on a shelf behind the register. However, they needed to know a certain password to buy it. The password was "FILBRICK," the word written in invisible ink on the back of the Stan Bucks packaged with the jigsaw puzzle. Using the password, a fan retrieved the eyeball jar and found the tenth clue written on the bottom of it. Additionally, Hirsch stated that fans will receive a prize if they take a selfie with the framed photo of the Gravity Falls crew at Confusion Hill. The framed photo is from a different Gravity Falls event called "Mystery Tour 2013".

=== Eleventh clue: Amity, Oregon ===
The tenth clue pointed to the eleventh clue's location, which was at Stanley Street in Amity, Oregon, near a pair of telephone poles. The tenth clue also mentioned the word "bolt" which was underlined. A group of fans went to the street as instructed and found a geocache bolt, which they somehow lost before finding it again. They unscrewed it to find the eleventh clue inside, written double-sided on a very narrow strip of paper.

=== Twelfth and final clue: Turner, Oregon ===
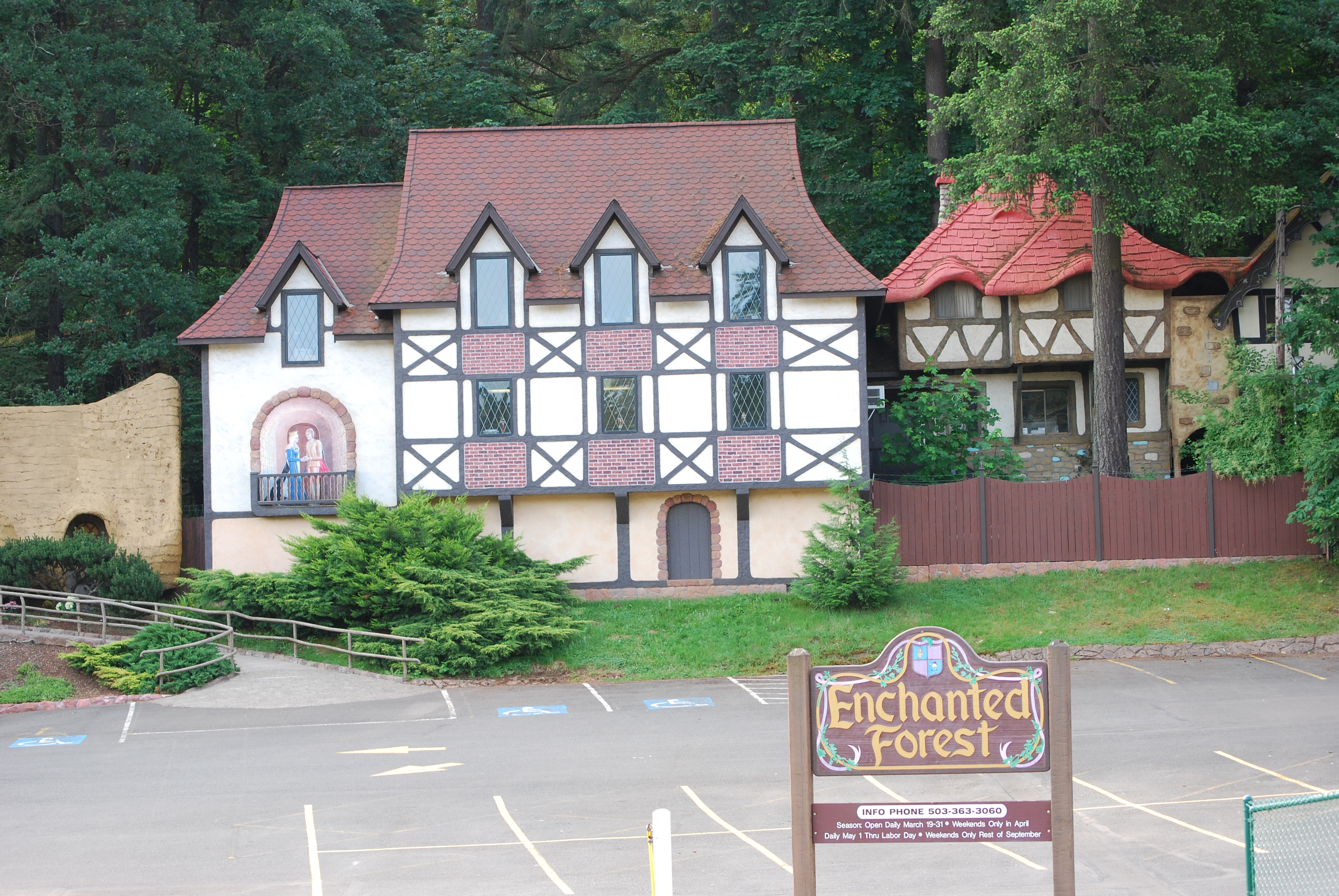
The Enchanted Forest in Turner, Oregon, the location of the twelfth and final clue.

The twelfth clue was found at the Enchanted Forest amusement park in Turner, Oregon, as the eleventh clue mentioned Roger Tofte, the creator of the amusement park. The eleventh clue also mentioned that the next clue was located "behind a sign, buried at the base" and "near Pa's laundry on a hill". A family raced to Enchanted Forest in pursuit of the clue and dug around in the dirt at the base of a sign that reads "Here lies the bones of a man named Bill" which was located near Pa's laundry shop, but found nothing. Hirsch eventually realized that the clue was already taken by another fan before the family got there. The fan uploaded the image of the twelfth clue online, which was a ripped piece of paper that contained an encoded riddle. The riddle told fans to "return to where it all began" and "the answers written in the trees".

The twelfth clue was revealed to be the final clue, with the next stop in the hunt being the location of Bill Cipher's statue. On the back of the final clue, there was a dotted red line leading to an X, as if it was a treasure map. This dotted line can be combined with the dotted red line found on the initial Cipher Hunt image posted by Hirsch on Twitter, revealing that the final clue is the ripped off top left corner of the image. Fans used the initial image and final clue combined to search for the statue in several locations across the West Coast with no results. Meanwhile, many people made unsuccessful attempts to find an encoded message in the trees seen behind Bill's statue in the image.

=== Reedsport, Oregon ===
After several days with no progress and asking fans on Twitter if they wanted it, Hirsch tweeted a hint for the final clue, which revealed that a Polybius square was needed to solve the clue. Fans also needed to find a pattern in the branches and knots of the trees in the image that could be converted to pairs of numbers, as well as finding out which specific version of the Polybius square was used to encode the message. Through clever cryptoanalysis of the branches and knots, and by manipulating the possible results with the assumption that the decoded message was a location that had to end with the letters "OR" (the abbreviation for Oregon), a "reverse" code cracking method was used. The most likely resulting message was "REEDSPORTOR," so the fans were able to narrow down the location of the statue to Reedsport, Oregon. Hirsch retweeted messages of fans that were heading there, reinforcing the assumption. The treasure map found on the back of the twelfth clue was assumed to be a map through the city's parks or surrounding forests to find the statue, so the fans searched in Google Maps for a path where the map fitted, locating one at the end of S 22nd Street, south of Reedsport Community Charter School. The complete code was cracked later that evening confirming the message to be "REEDSPORTOR".

Fans quickly raced to the city to be the first to find the statue of Bill Cipher. The statue was found on August 2, 2016, at 7:53pm PDT by Twitter user @shadow_wolfwind (who changed her Twitter handle to @OfficialGFMayor following the hunt), who tweeted a photo of it. Later, a treasure chest buried in front of the statue was found and dug up by other fans, with several of them shaking the statue's hand, including a baby.

The treasure chest contained a wide array of loot, such as plastic coins and gems, Russian and Japanese currency, a copy of the book Gravity Falls: Journal 3 which was signed and contained a special drawing by Hirsch himself, a black light flashlight, a plastic crown, a sash that says "Mayor of Gravity Falls," a music box with Bill Cipher's eye drawn on it that plays the show's theme song, a slip of paper with a message written by Hirsch in invisible ink, a miniature Bill Cipher statue, a framed sketch of the main characters standing with the statue, and a USB drive. Some currency in the chest was marked by a person named Bradley who had found the treasure a month before the hunt began.

The USB drive contained a text document that contains a link to Bradley's Twitter account, an audio file of Grunkle Stan singing the song "We'll Meet Again" and congratulating the finders, and another text document entitled "MyExWifeStillMissesMe.ButHerAimIsGettinBetter," which, when opened in Microsoft Notepad, a text reading "RETURNBACKWARDSTOTHEPASTAGAINTHREE" appears. When "RETURNBACKWARDS" and "TOTHEPASTAGAINTHREE" are entered as a username and password respectively on the website themysteryofgravityfalls.com/pilot, it would allow users to watch the unaired pilot episode of Gravity Falls, which is a prototype of "Tourist Trapped", the series' first episode, made with an entirely different art style and some altered dialogue and scenes.

== Aftermath ==
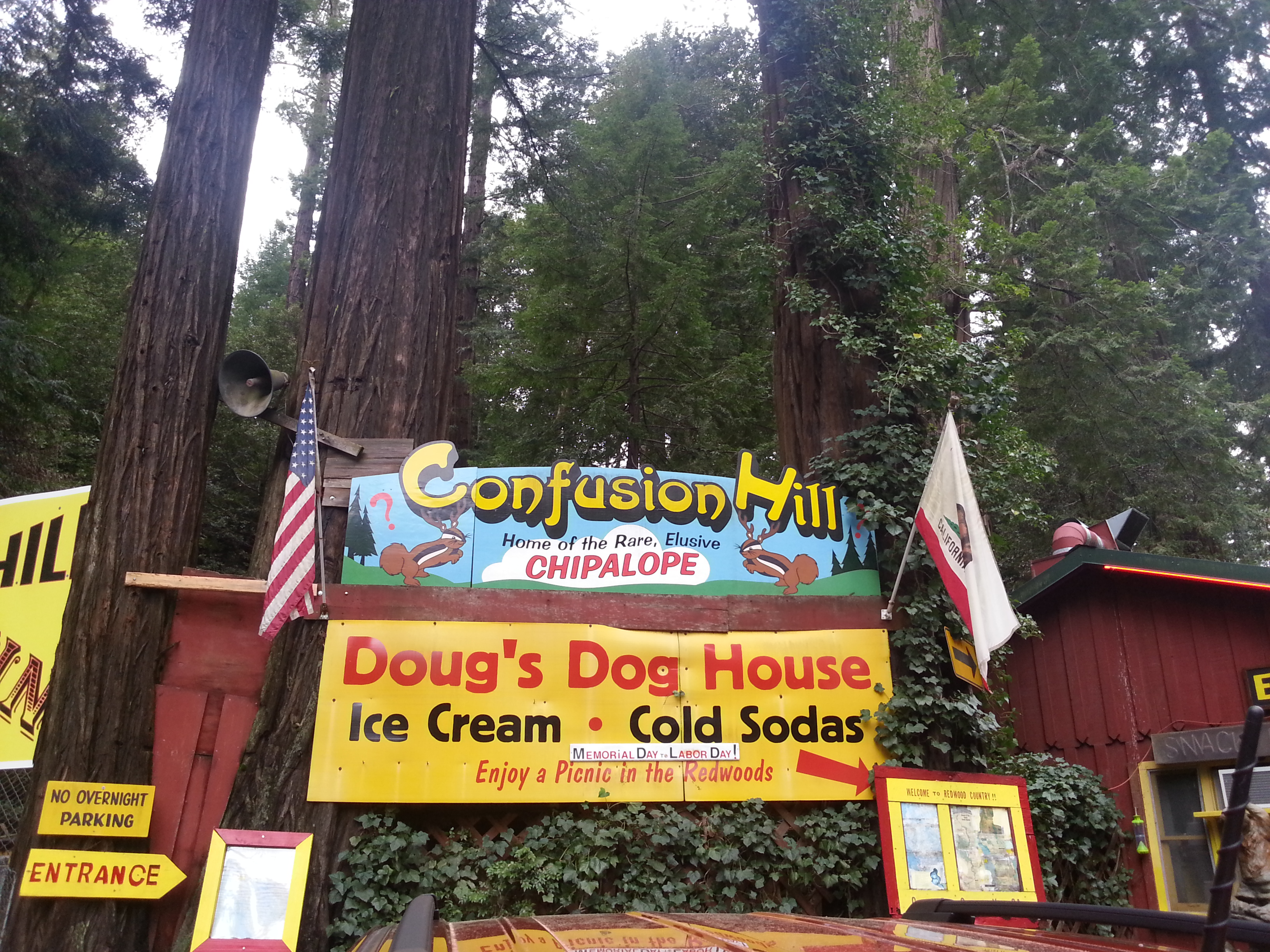
Confusion Hill in Piercy, California currently houses the statue and the completed puzzle.

On August 3, a day after Bill Cipher's statue was found, the statue and its treasure were taken by local authorities because of a property conflict between the apparent proprietor who had authorized Hirsch to place the statue and another person claiming ownership of the land where it was located. Its hat was broken in the process, though it had already sustained damage. Reedsport Police ended up holding the statue at the Reedsport police department, keeping it intact, while Hirsch arranged for it to be moved somewhere else. While at the police station, the statue's hat was stolen by a fan who claimed it was theirs. Alex put out a now deleted tweet asking the fan to return the hat, but no one ever came forward with it. It was later revealed that the hat actually became infested with fire ants and had to be thrown away, and Hirsch mistakenly assumed that it was stolen by a fan due to not being on the scene. By August 5, the statue ended up in Reedsport's Bicentennial Park, where it was bolted to the top of a tree above the ground, lacking its hat. The treasure box was placed beneath the statue. Fans continued to visit the statue.

On August 15, Hirsch called for volunteers to relocate Bill's hat and to move the statue via truck to a new location. Three days later, on August 18, the statue had been removed from Bicentennial Park with a sign in its place that read "BILL WAS HERE" by the person who drove the statue to its final resting place, Samuel Irish, when decoded through a substitution cipher. On August 19, Irish tweeted on his account @Knarkill34, that he had moved the statue to an undisclosed location but provided pictures. On August 20, several fans discovered that the statue was moved to Confusion Hill in Piercy, California. The statue acquired a new hat within a week, and the treasure box was not transported to the attraction. The statue and the completed physical puzzle are both currently housed at Confusion Hill, along with a special treasure cache where fans have since taken and left treasures for fellow fans who wish to visit the statue. The new treasure box is located behind the counter at the gift shop and can be viewed at request. The box contains a message congratulating fans on finding Bill and encourages fans to take and leave treasures for future fans' pilgrimages so there's always something for someone on their own Cipher Hunt. In September 2016, the treasure box was replaced with a newer larger treasure box to hold all the items that fans had since left that could no longer fit in the previous box. It also contains a log book for fans to document their name, date they "found Bill", and where they traveled from.

Deleted scenes from Gravity Falls, which were promised during the hunt, were released as part of the Gravity Falls: The Complete Series DVD box set.

Numerous online media outlets have reported on the hunt and its progress, including Atlas Obscura, The Daily Dot, and io9.

=== Bradley ===
Although Twitter user @shadow_wolfwind, the recipient of the "Mayor of Gravity Falls" sash stored in the treasure chest, is the first official person to have found the Bill Cipher statue, the chest also contained Stan Bucks that have been signed by a person named Bradley Pic who found the statue on July 12, eight days prior to the start of Cipher Hunt, making him the actual first person to find it.

During an appearance on the Mystery Shack Lookback Podcast in July 2022, Alex Hirsch revealed the full story behind what happened and how Bradley's name ended up in the chest. Bradley was a resident of Reedsport, Oregon who accidentally found the statue while going out for a walk one day. According to Hirsch, this was shortly after he had placed the statue in its location as Gravity Falls had not yet ended. Bradley had never heard of the show, but posted an image of the statue to an unsolved mysteries subreddit, though the post did not gain much attention. Hirsch claims the person behind the @TheMysteryofGF Twitter page managed to find the post and reached out to him, though the person behind @TheMysteryofGF has no recollection or saved messages indicating they were the one to inform Hirsch. Knowing the hunt could be ruined if the post was found by fans, Hirsch was able to get in touch with Bradley and informed him about what the statue was and asked him to take the post down. In exchange for taking it down and his silence about the statue and its location, Hirsch paid Bradley $100, gave him a prize and allowed him to take the credit for finding the statue after Cipher Hunt was over.

Before the hunt started and after paying off Bradley, Hirsch realized that he had forgotten to add the voice memo of Grunkle Stan singing “We’ll Meet Again” to the USB drive inside the treasure chest. Hirsch called Bradley, and he agreed to replace the USB drive with a new one sent by Alex Hirsch. Bradley returned to the statue, dug up the treasure chest, and replaced the USB drive. At the same time, he signed his name on the Stan Bucks inside it and left a text file on the USB drive named "Hi.txt" which contained a link to his Twitter account. He would later upload a video of him finding the statue to help answer questions fans had about why his name and link to his Twitter account were in the treasure, however, the full story would not be revealed until 2022 by Hirsch.
