= Confusion Hill =

California roadside attraction

Coordinates: 39°55′08.1″N 123°45′53.8″W

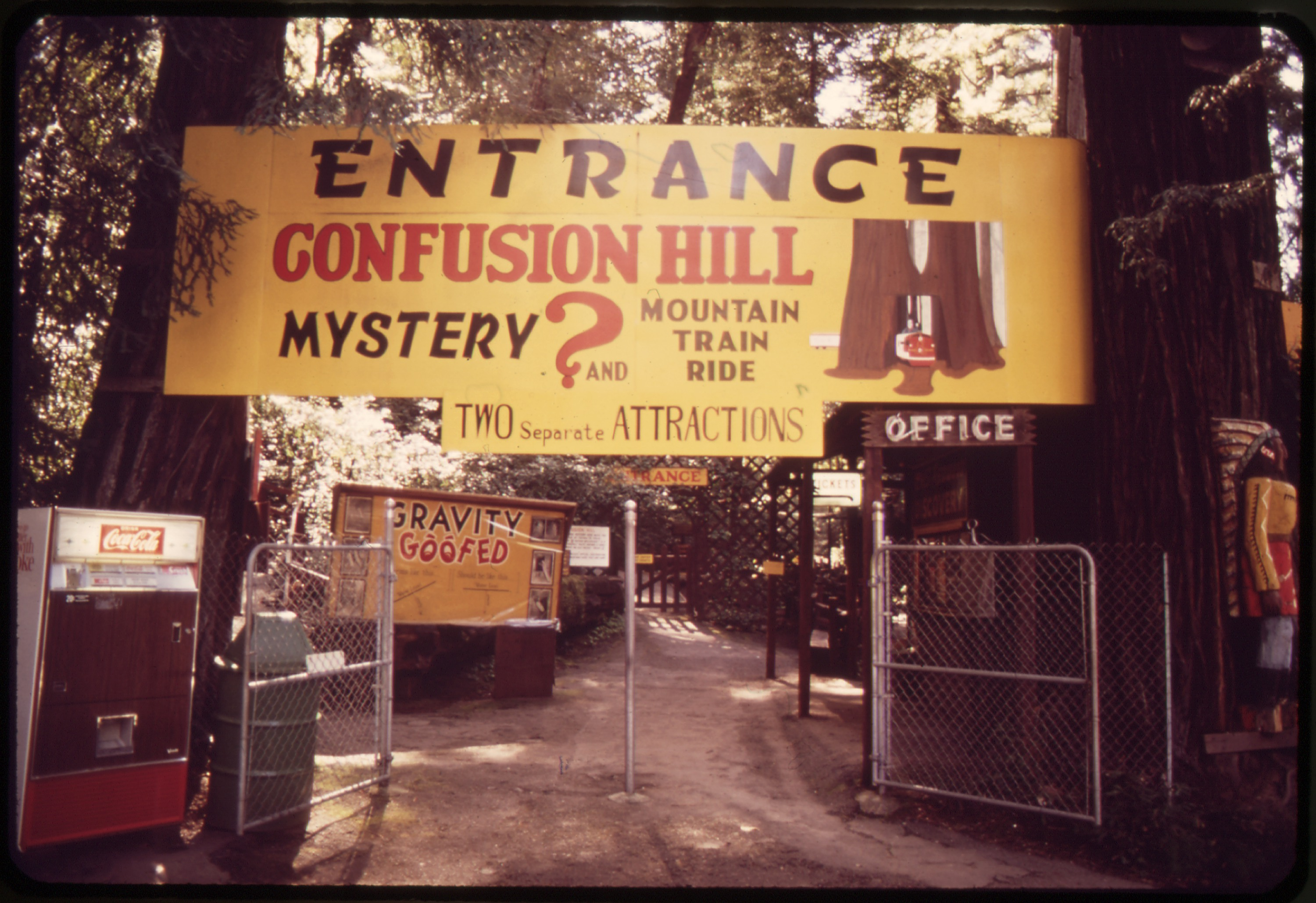
Entrance to Confusion Hill in 1972

Confusion Hill is a roadside attraction in Piercy, California. The attraction, which opened in 1949, includes what is dubbed as a "gravity house", a structure built to give the interior visitors tilt-induced optical illusions, similar to the perspective on a gravity hill. Occupants experience the need to stand upright when they actually already are. Also included in the attraction is the Mountain Train Ride a 1 1/2-mile (2.4 km) 20 in (508 mm) narrow gauge built in a switchback layout along the side of a steep hill.

For 60 years, Confusion Hill was on the heavily traveled US 101 highway, also known as the Redwood Highway. Due to repeated mudslides obstructing the road, US 101 was realigned in 2009 to the Confusion Hill Bridges, bypassing the attraction. In 2010 Confusion Hill was granted California Points of Historical Interest status.

== Gravity Falls ==
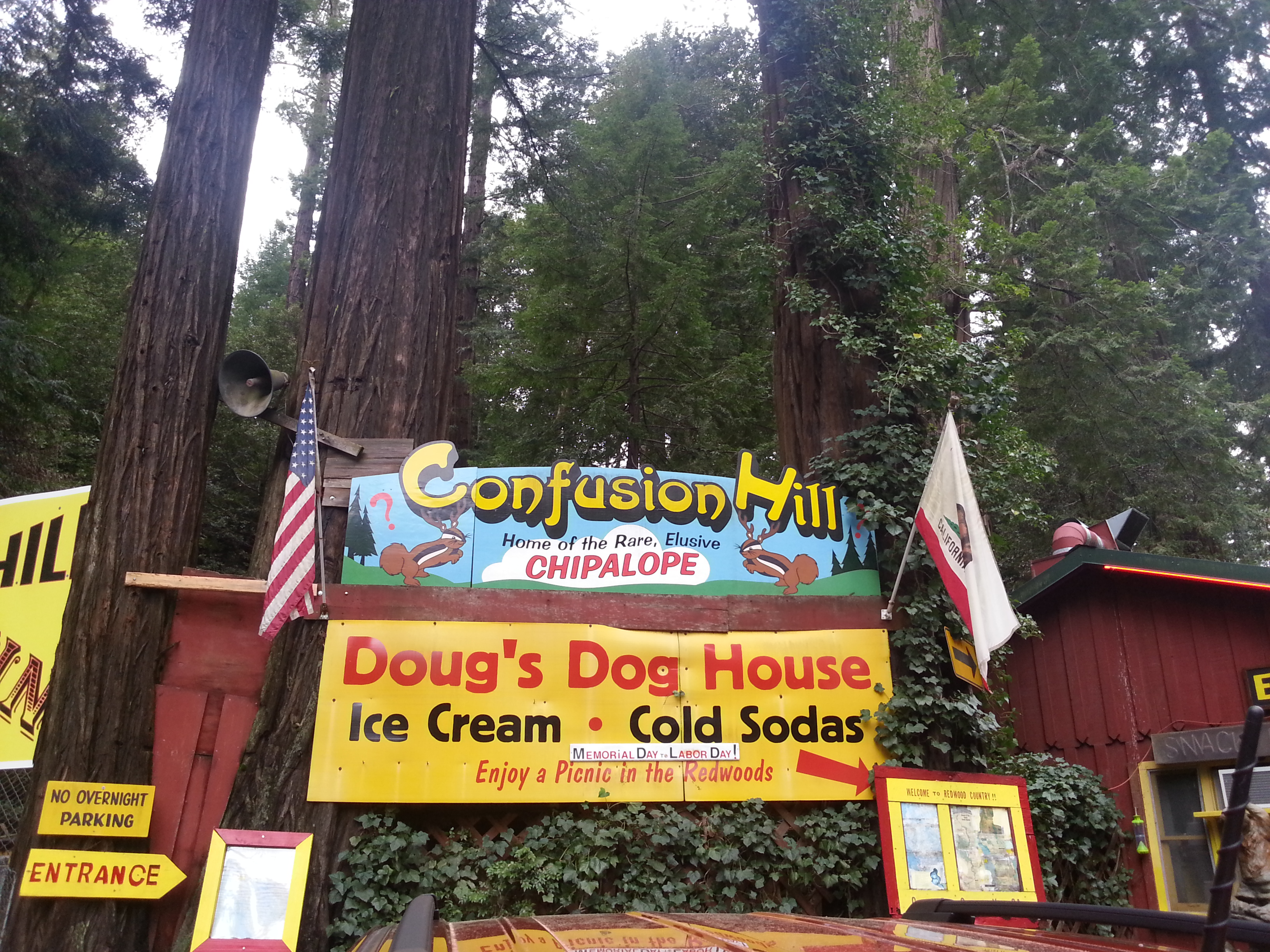
Signs at Confusion Hill, 2016

In August 2016, Alex Hirsch, creator of the television series Gravity Falls, installed a statue of series antagonist Bill Cipher at Confusion Hill after it was removed from its initial home of Reedsport, Oregon, following a global scavenger hunt to locate the statue, known as the Cipher Hunt.

In 2020, Confusion Hill faced closure due to financial hurdles brought on by the COVID-19 pandemic. A GoFundMe was set up and with help from Hirsch and the Gravity Falls fanbase, the target goal was raised and exceeded.
