= Moss Beach, California =

Moss Beach
- Census designated place
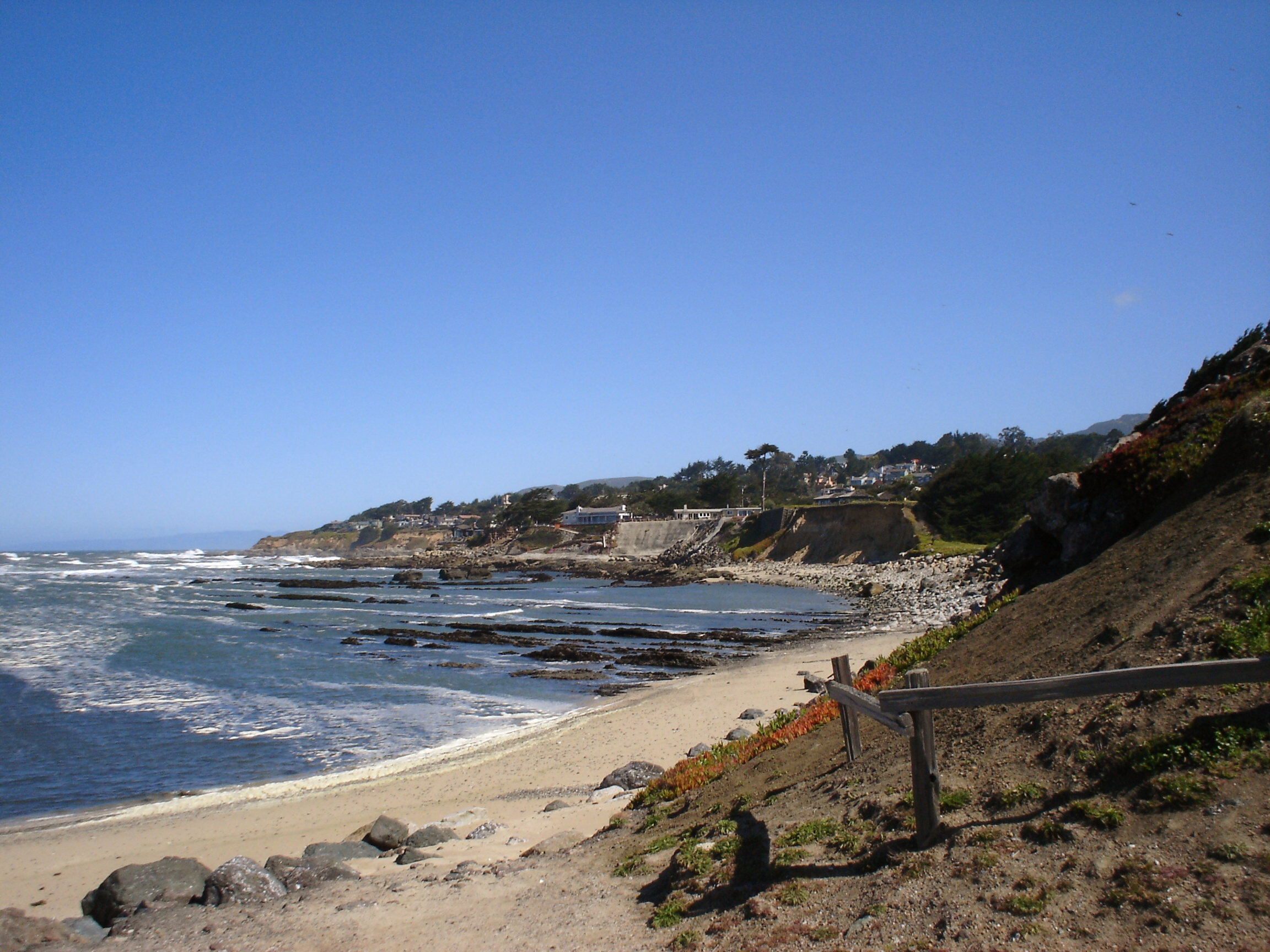
- Moss Beach shoreline, April 2007. Part of the Franciscan formation is visible near the beach

- Location in San Mateo County and the state of California

- Location in the United States Moss Beach (California) Moss Beach (San Francisco Bay Area)
- Coordinates: 37°31′31″N 122°30′46″W
- Country: United States
- State: California
- County: San Mateo

Area
  - Total: 2.245 sq mi (5.815 km^{2})
  - Land: 2.245 sq mi (5.815 km^{2})
  - Water: 0 sq mi (0 km^{2}) 0%
- Elevation: 66 ft (20 m)

Population (April 1, 2020)
  - Total: 3,214
  - Density: 1,432/sq mi (552.7/km^{2})
- Time zone: UTC-8 (Pacific)
  - Summer (DST): UTC-7 (PDT)
- ZIP code: 94038
- Area code: 650
- FIPS code: 06-49446
- GNIS feature ID: 1659183

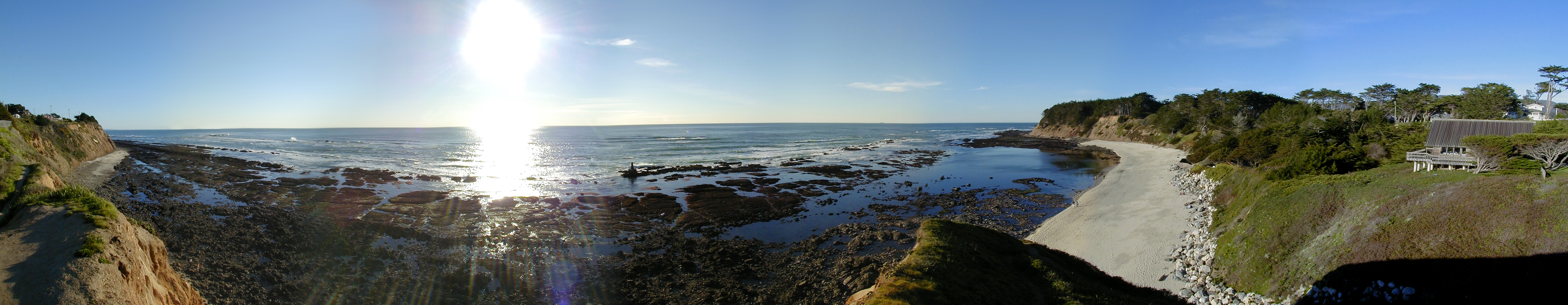
A panorama of Moss Beach

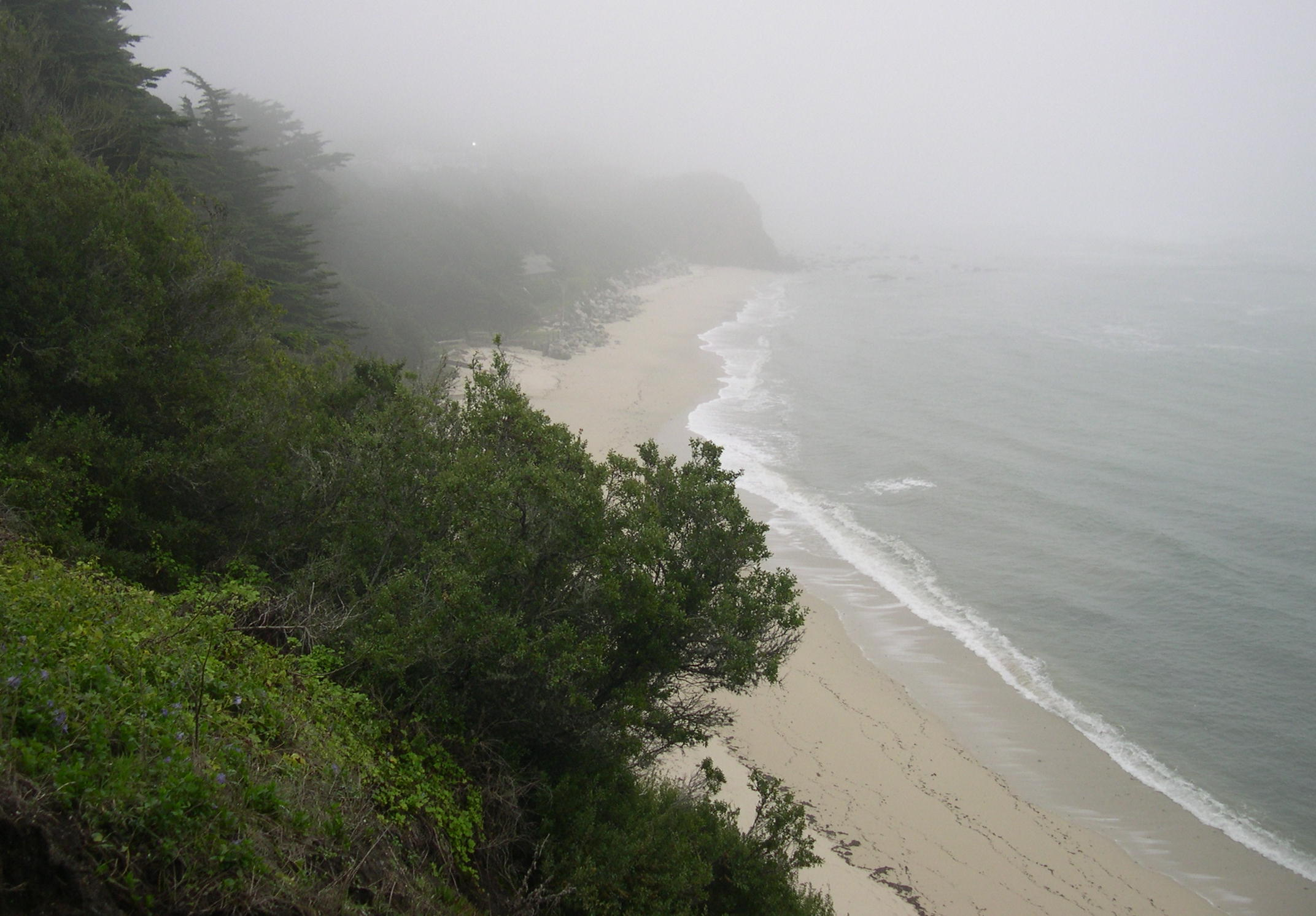
Beach within Fitzgerald Marine Reserve looking south

Moss Beach is a coastal census-designated place in San Mateo County, California, United States, with a year 2020 census population of 3,214. Located in Moss Beach are the Fitzgerald Marine Reserve, a marine sanctuary; the Half Moon Bay Airport, the historic Moss Beach Distillery; and the Seal Cove Inn, a destination lodging property. Moss Beach has a cool coastal microclimate that gives a sense of separation from the nearby metropolitan San Francisco Bay Area and assures that summer temperatures are generally mild.

== History ==
Moss Beach began as a resort destination, with its first hotel built in 1881 by Juergen Wienke. It grew with the advent of the Ocean Shore Railroad.

== Geography ==
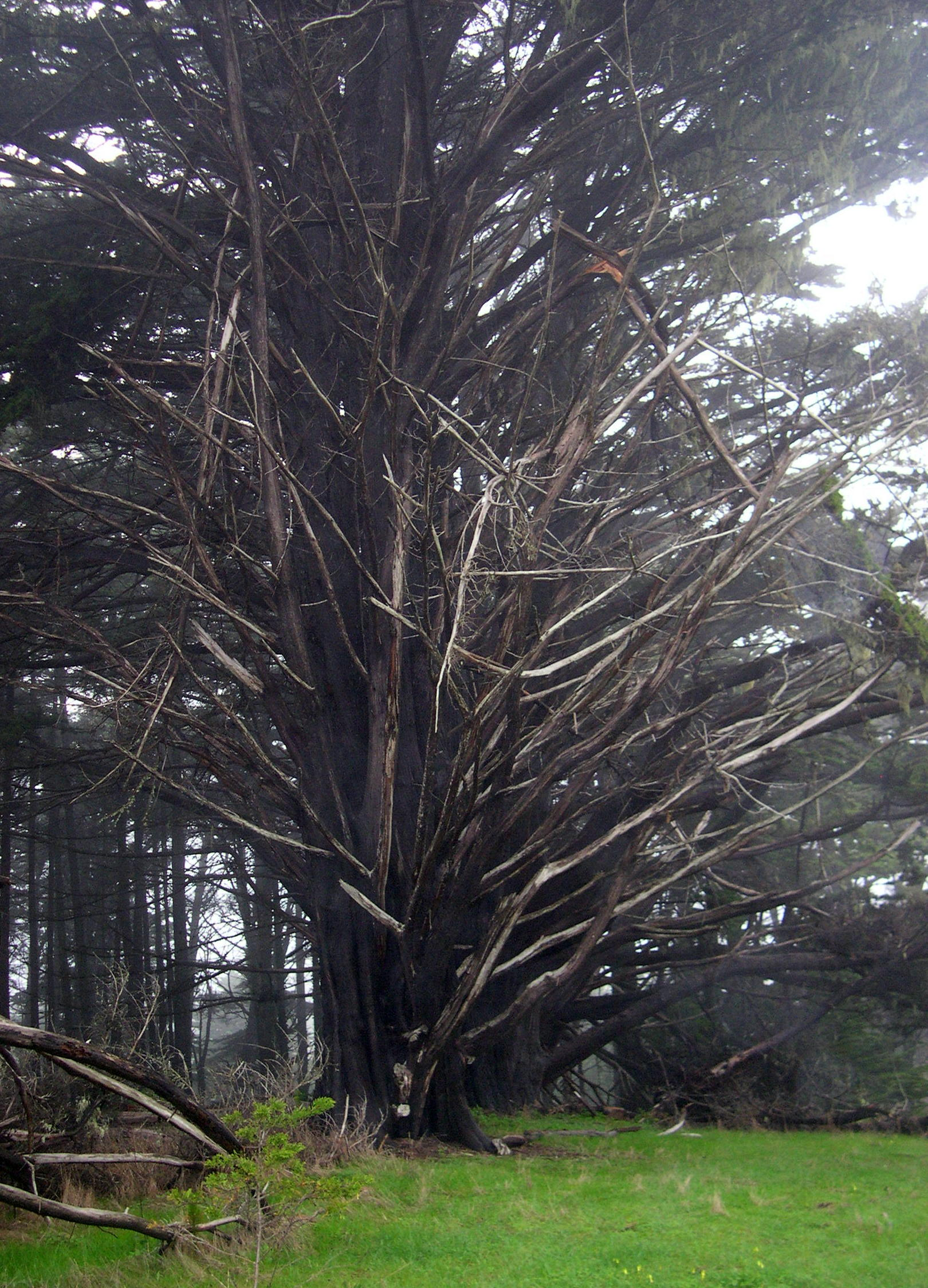
Monterey cypress trees atop coastal bluff

Moss Beach is situated at 37°31'31" North latitude, 122°30'46" West (37.525240, -122.512811), approximately 20 miles (32 km) south of San Francisco and 50 miles (80 km) north of Santa Cruz, California. Nearby towns include Montara to the north, El Granada, Princeton-by-the-Sea, and Half Moon Bay to the south. According to the United States Census Bureau, the CDP has a total area of 2.2 square miles (5.7 km^{2}), all land.

== Demographics ==
=== 2020 census ===
As of the 2020 census, Moss Beach had a population of 3,214 and a population density of 1,431.6 inhabitants per square mile (552.7/km^{2}). The median age was 44.6 years. The age distribution was 19.1% under the age of 18, 8.1% aged 18 to 24, 23.4% aged 25 to 44, 29.2% aged 45 to 64, and 20.1% who were 65 years of age or older. For every 100 females, there were 100.4 males, and for every 100 females age 18 and over, there were 101.9 males age 18 and over.

The census reported that 96.4% of the population lived in households, 0.5% lived in non-institutionalized group quarters, and 3.2% were institutionalized. 97.2% of residents lived in urban areas, while 2.8% lived in rural areas.

There were 1,067 households, out of which 29.7% included children under the age of 18. Of all households, 58.4% were married-couple households, 7.1% were cohabiting couple households, 21.3% had a female householder with no spouse or partner present, and 13.2% had a male householder with no spouse or partner present. 18.5% of households were one person, and 12.0% were one person aged 65 or older. The average household size was 2.9. There were 777 families (72.8% of all households).

There were 1,155 housing units at an average density of 514.5 units per square mile (198.6 units/km^{2}), of which 1,067 (92.4%) were occupied. Of occupied units, 85.1% were owner-occupied and 14.9% were occupied by renters. 7.6% of housing units were vacant. The homeowner vacancy rate was 0.8% and the rental vacancy rate was 8.9%.

Racial composition as of the 2020 census
| Race | Number | Percent |
|---|---|---|
| White | 1,860 | 57.9% |
| Black or African American | 32 | 1.0% |
| American Indian and Alaska Native | 38 | 1.2% |
| Asian | 164 | 5.1% |
| Native Hawaiian and Other Pacific Islander | 4 | 0.1% |
| Some other race | 688 | 21.4% |
| Two or more races | 428 | 13.3% |
| Hispanic or Latino (of any race) | 1,089 | 33.9% |

=== Income and poverty ===
In 2023, the US Census Bureau estimated that the median household income was $128,333, and the per capita income was $53,880. About 1.2% of families and 5.5% of the population were below the poverty line.

=== 2010 census ===
The 2010 United States census reported that Moss Beach had a population of 3,103. The population density was 1,377.0 inhabitants per square mile (531.7/km^{2}). The racial make-up of Moss Beach was 2,280 (73.5%) White, 25 (0.8%) African American, 43 (1.4%) Native American, 118 (3.8%) Asian, 9 (0.3%) Pacific Islander, 494 (15.9%) from other races, and 134 (4.3%) from two or more races. Hispanic or Latino of any race were 903 persons (29.1%).

The census reported that 2,983 people (96.1% of the population) lived in households, 12 (0.4%) lived in non-institutionalized group quarters, and 108 (3.5%) were institutionalized.

There were 1,062 households, of which 359 (33.8%) had children under the age of 18 living in them, 607 (57.2%) were opposite-sex married couples living together, 85 (8.0%) had a female householder with no husband present, 41 (3.9%) had a male householder with no wife present. There were 49 (4.6%) unmarried opposite-sex partnerships, and 14 (1.3%) same-sex married couples or partnerships. 251 households (23.6%) were made up of individuals, and 68 (6.4%) had someone living alone who was 65 years of age or older. The average household size was 2.81. There were 733 families (69.0% of all households); the average family size was 3.35.

710 people (22.9%) were under the age of 18, 234 people (7.5%) aged 18 to 24, 699 people (22.5%) aged 25 to 44, 1,097 people (35.4%) aged 45 to 64, and 363 people (11.7%) were 65 years of age or older. The median age was 43.2 years. For every 100 females, there were 99.9 males. For every 100 females age 18 and over, there were 97.6 males.

There were 1,154 housing units at an average density of 512.1 per square mile (197.7/km^{2}), of which 868 (81.7%) were owner-occupied, and 194 (18.3%) were occupied by renters. The homeowner vacancy rate was 1.2%; the rental vacancy rate was 6.3%. 2,448 people (78.9% of the population) lived in owner-occupied housing units and 535 people (17.2%) lived in rental housing units.

== Climate ==
Moss Beach has a Mediterranean climate (Köppen Csb) typical of the West Coast that is characterized by mild, rainy winters and cool, mild to warm summers, with an average temperature of 55°F (13 °C).

The area experiences some warmer degrees than Half Moon Bay due its proximity to San Francisco and coastal influence fog all year round and an Indian summer.

There is no significant snow occurring in Moss Beach in winter months. Though snowfall along the coast in Moss Beach has never been measurable, however, snow flurries were observed in December 1972 and 1976.

Hot weather is not unusual; the average annual days with highs of 90 °F (32 °C) or higher can occur in summertime. Cold weather is also rare with lows of 44.3 °F (6.8 °C) or lower. Typical of Northern California, most of the rain falls from November to April. The normal annual precipitation is 27.2 inches (691 mm). There is often fog and overcast during the night and morning hours, usually clearing to offshore during the afternoon. Persistent sea breezes help to moderate the climate along the coast.

January is the coolest month with an average high of 57.5 °F (14.2 °C) and an average low of 44.3 °F (6.8 °C). August and September are the warmest months with an average high of 70.6 °F (21.4 °C) and an average low of 53.8 °F (12.1 °C) within the summer months.

Climate data for Moss Beach, California
| Month | Jan | Feb | Mar | Apr | May | Jun | Jul | Aug | Sep | Oct | Nov | Dec | Year |
|---|---|---|---|---|---|---|---|---|---|---|---|---|---|
| Mean daily maximum °F (°C) | 57.5 (14.2) | 59.6 (15.3) | 61.1 (16.2) | 62.9 (17.2) | 64.8 (18.2) | 67.9 (19.9) | 69.2 (20.7) | 70.1 (21.2) | 70.6 (21.4) | 68.3 (20.2) | 62.5 (16.9) | 57.6 (14.2) | 64.3 (18.0) |
| Daily mean °F (°C) | 50.9 (10.5) | 52.6 (11.4) | 53.7 (12.1) | 55.0 (12.8) | 57.4 (14.1) | 60.0 (15.6) | 60.6 (15.9) | 62.4 (16.9) | 62.2 (16.8) | 59.9 (15.5) | 55.2 (12.9) | 51.2 (10.7) | 56.8 (13.8) |
| Mean daily minimum °F (°C) | 44.3 (6.8) | 45.6 (7.6) | 46.3 (7.9) | 47.1 (8.4) | 49.9 (9.9) | 52.0 (11.1) | 53.9 (12.2) | 54.6 (12.6) | 53.8 (12.1) | 51.5 (10.8) | 47.8 (8.8) | 44.8 (7.1) | 49.3 (9.6) |
| Average precipitation inches (mm) | 5.3 (130) | 5.1 (130) | 3.8 (97) | 1.7 (43) | 0.8 (20) | 0.2 (5.1) | 0.1 (2.5) | 0.2 (5.1) | 0.3 (7.6) | 1.4 (36) | 3.1 (79) | 5.2 (130) | 27.2 (685.3) |
| Average rainy days | 12 | 12 | 11 | 7 | 5 | 3 | 2.5 | 3 | 4 | 5 | 9 | 11 | 84.5 |

== Politics ==
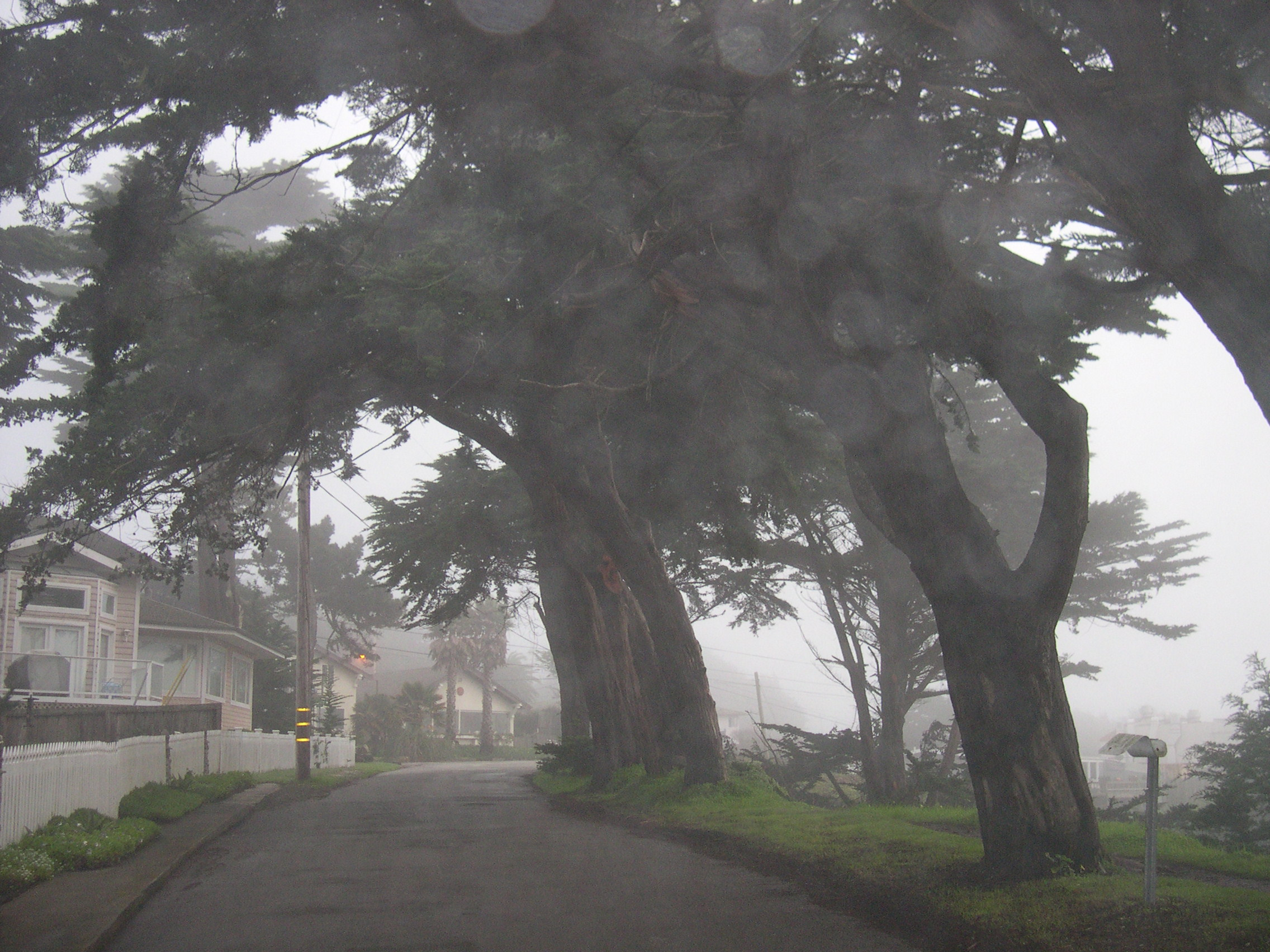
Typical Moss Beach Streetscape

Locally, Moss Beach and other portions of the unincorporated Midcoast is represented by the elected Midcoast Community Council.

In the California State Legislature, Moss Beach is in the 13th senatorial district, represented by Democrat Josh Becker, and in the 23rd Assembly district, represented by Democrat Marc Berman.

Federally, Moss Beach is in California's 16th congressional district, represented by Democrat Sam Liccardo.

== Noteworthy features ==
Because of the air currents off the Pacific Ocean, Moss Beach experiences above average fog levels, but also high quality ambient air. Situated along the coast of Moss Beach is the Fitzgerald Marine Reserve, a California designated area of Special Biological Significance. The reserve has a scenic blufftop trail through cypress groves overlooking the Pacific Ocean, historically significant tidepools, and a variety of marine animals and pelagic birds. The outcroppings along the beach are part of the Franciscan Complex.

Montara State Marine Reserve & Pillar Point State Marine Conservation Area extend offshore from Moss Beach. Like underwater parks, these protected areas help conserve ocean wildlife and marine ecosystems.

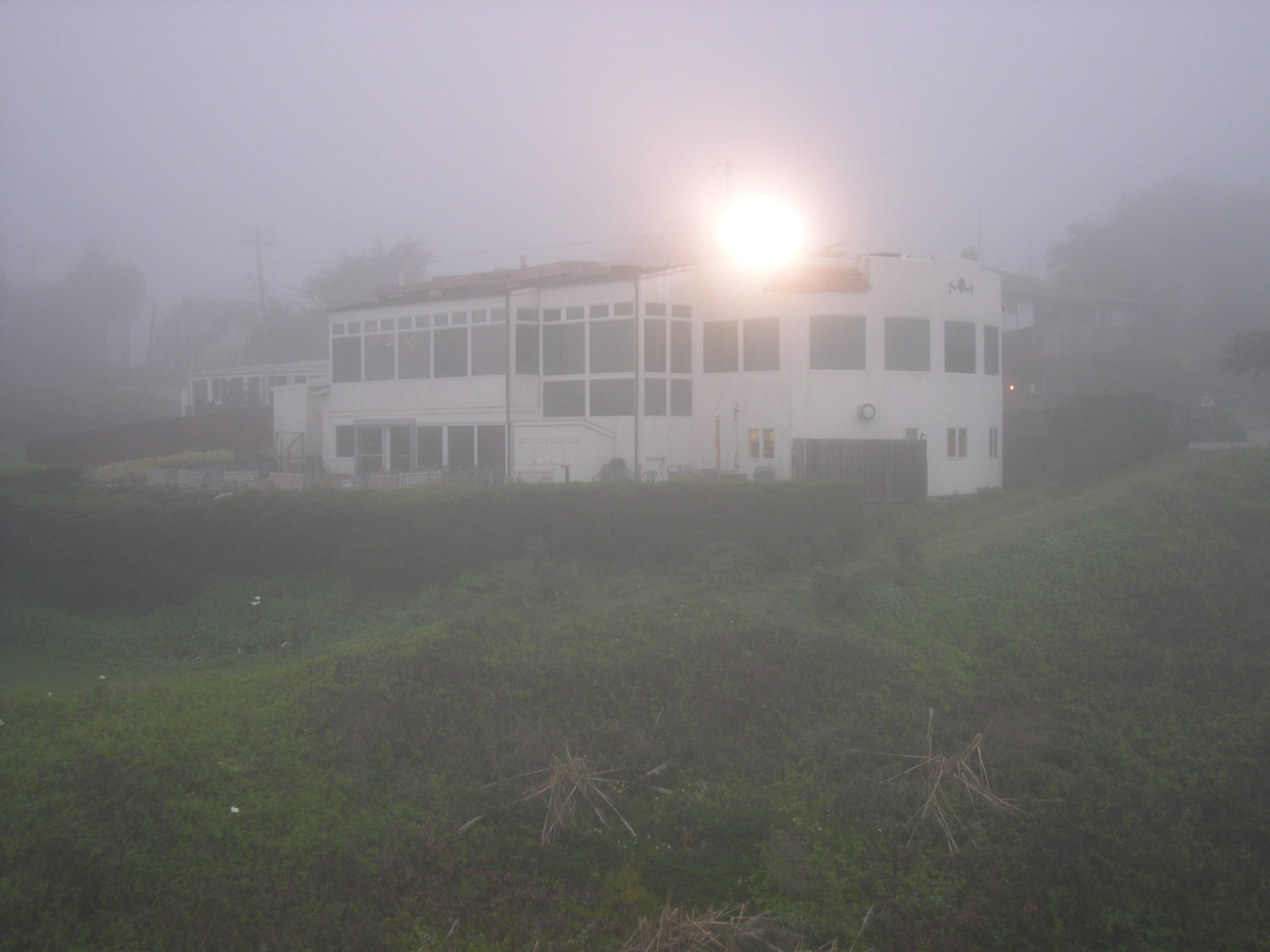
Moss Beach Distillery photographed standing at cliffedge

An occurrence of the rare plant Hickman's potentilla, Potentilla hickmanii, was observed by E.C. Suttliffe in 1933 in the vicinity of the mouth of San Vicente Creek within Moss Beach. This colony was not further documented for decades, but another colony was discovered toward the end of the 20th century north of Moss Beach. The plant was listed as California endangered in 1973 and as an endangered species by the United States government in 1998.

Off State Route 1 is Moss Beach Distillery, a restaurant that has its roots in bootleg liquor during Prohibition. The building is a California Point of Historical Interest. The restaurant, which claims to be haunted, was featured on the television series Ghost Hunters, where they revealed that owners of the distillery have created hoaxes simulating paranormal activity.

== Transportation ==
Primary road access is via State Route 1 (the Cabrillo Highway) from the north and south.

SamTrans route 117 provides service to Moss Beach with service from Linda Mar in Pacifica to Half Moon Bay.
