= Moss Beach Distillery =

Restaurant in Moss Beach, California

Coordinates: 37°31′04″N 122°30′46″W

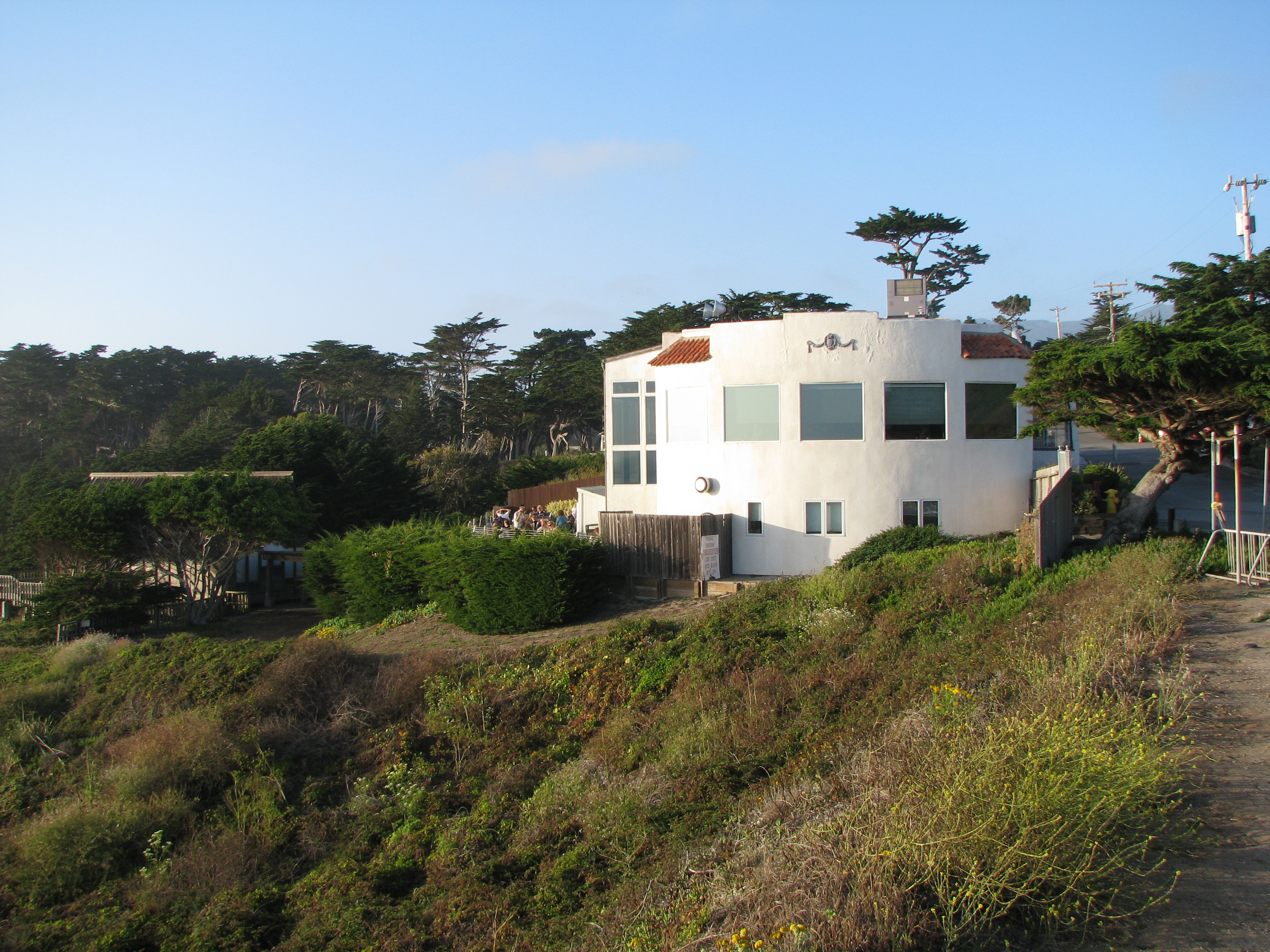
Moss Beach Distillery in 2009

Moss Beach Distillery is a restaurant in Moss Beach, California, located on a cliff which overlooks the Pacific Ocean. It is officially designated as a California Point of Historical Interest. Originally established in 1927 as a speakeasy, it converted into a successful restaurant after the repeal of Prohibition in 1933.

== History ==
The restaurant dates back to the Prohibition era when it was a speakeasy called Frank's Place. Owner Frank Torres built the club in 1927. Reportedly, illegal whisky was brought from ships, to the beach, and into vehicles for transport to San Francisco.

== Haunting hoax ==
According to the restaurant, the "Blue Lady," a female apparition dressed in blue, is reportedly seen in and around the restaurant. The Moss Beach Distillery promotes the legend and encourages tourism. In 2008, the cast of Ghost Hunters came to investigate the claims and instead found "a series of elaborate devices meant to scare people that were built into the restaurant, like a ghostly face in a bathroom mirror and a speaker that emitted laughter when triggered by a sensor". The team refused to investigate further after the discovery. According to an interview in the Fresno Bee, former Disney employee Daryn Coleman designed and installed devices to make the chandeliers sway and a phone that rings by itself. According to an analysis by SFGate's Kate Dowd, the haunting claims did not appear before 1981 and the details claimed by the Distillery are inaccurate and the story was likely created by former owners Mike and Shirley Sarno for a local business interview.
