= Rancho Rincon de San Francisquito =

Mexican land grant in California

Coordinates: 37.420°N 122.140°W

Rancho Rincon de San Francisquito was a 8,418-acre (34.07 km^{2}) Mexican land grant in present-day Santa Clara County, California given in 1841 by Governor Juan Alvarado to José Peña. The name means "corner or bend of the San Francisquito" referring to San Francisquito Creek. The grant extended along Matadero Creek to the hills and included the southern part of present-day Palo Alto and the southern part of the Stanford University campus.

== History ==
José Peña (1777–1852), an artilleryman at the Presidio of San Francisco, received permission from the Mission Santa Clara in 1822 to occupy a square league of its pasture land. At some point, Peña went to Mexico, but returned in the 1830s to reoccupy his property. In 1841, he applied for the land he had been using and was granted two square leagues by Governor Juan Bautista Alvarado. At the time, Peña was teaching school in the small community at Santa Clara. In 1847, Peña sold the entire the rancho, except for a small plot for himself, to Secundino Robles and his brother Teodoro. When Peña died in 1852, his widow Gertrudis Lorenzana (d.1865) remained owner of the adobe and its property, which an 1862 map shows near Lake Lagunita .

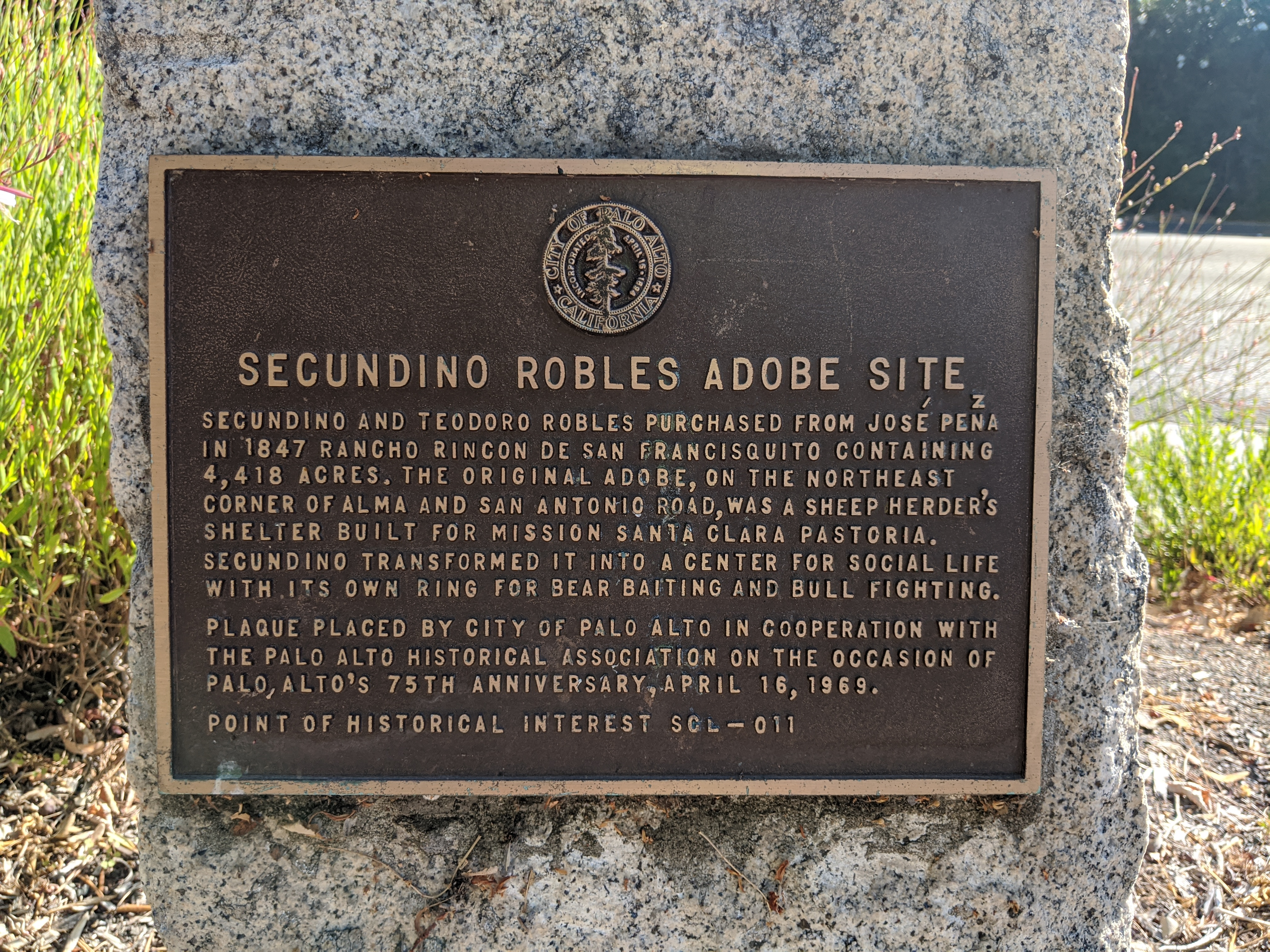
A plaque at the intersection of Ferne & Alma, commemorating an adobe built on the Rancho.

Secundino and his brother Teodoro Robles, bought Rancho Rincon de San Francisquito from José Peña in 1847. In 1824, Secundino Robles had discovered cinnabar deposits south of San Jose, when Ohlone Indians showed him where they retrieved their red-pigmented rock. By 1845, when these deposits proved to be rich in quicksilver, Secundino and Teodoro received cash and a one sixth share in Andres Castillero 's New Almaden Quicksilver Mine. Secundino Robles (1813–1890), born at Branciforte, was not as wild as his brothers Nicolas, Avelino, Flugencio and Teodoro. He married Maria Antonia Garcia (d.1897) in 1835, and raised a large family (Maria Antonia bore 29 children). In 1843, Secundino was employed as the Majordomo (foreman) of Mission Santa Clara, where he was joined by his brother, Teodoro.

With the cession of California to the United States following the Mexican-American War, the 1848 Treaty of Guadalupe Hidalgo provided that the land grants would be honored. As required by the Land Act of 1851, a claim for Rancho Rincon de San Francisquito was filed with the Public Land Commission in 1852, and the grant was patented to Secundino and his brother Teodoro Robles in 1868.

In 1853, Elisha Oscar Crosby bought 250 acres (1.0 km^{2}) from the Robles. Teodoro divorced his wife, Maria Rosalia Robles, in 1855, and lost half of his share of Rancho Rincon de San Francisquito in the divorce. Jeremiah Clarke of San Francisco purchased a portion of it from Maria Rosalia Robles in 1859. Frenchman Peter Coutts (Jean Baptiste Paulin Caperon) bought 1,162 acres (4.7 km^{2}) from Jeremiah Clarke. Coutts suddenly returned to France in 1880, and Leland Stanford bought the property in 1882. Secundino traded 500 acres (2.0 km^{2}) of his rancho to Jeremiah Clarke for a span of horses and a buggy. By 1859 much of the Robles' land had been sold to meet the combined expenses of legal fees, Teodoro's gambling debts and Secundino's overly generous hospitality, as well as, the expense in raising so many children. Secundino died penniless in 1890.

== See also ==
Ranchos of Santa Clara County, California
