= Piercy, California =

Unincorporated community in California, United States

Piercy
- Unincorporated community
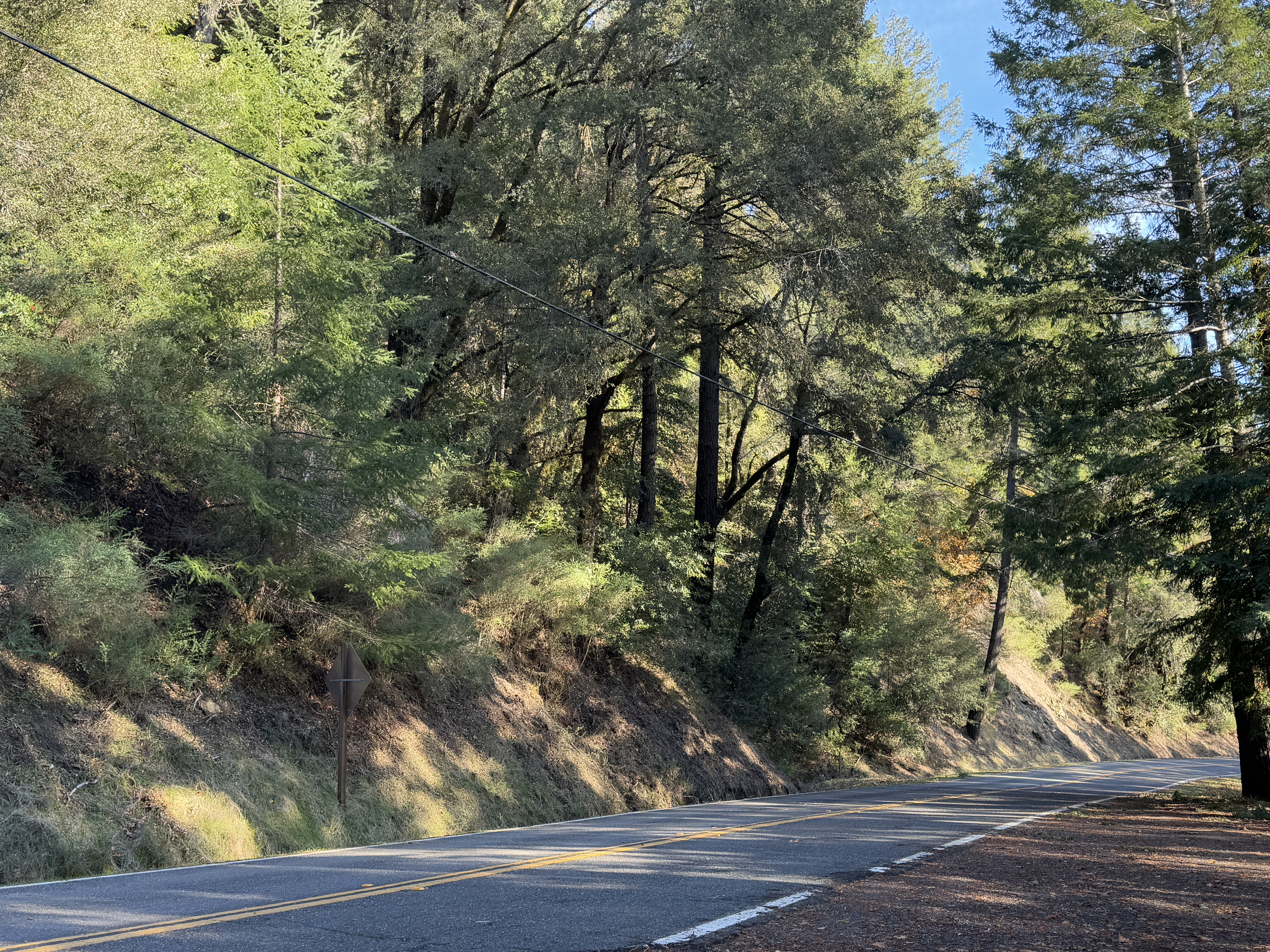
- California State Route 271 in Piercy in December 3, 2024.

- Location in California Piercy (the United States)
- Coordinates: 39°57′59″N 123°47′43″W
- Country: United States
- State: California
- County: Mendocino
- Elevation: 794 ft (242 m)
- ZIP code: 95587
- Area code: 707

Piercy is an unincorporated community in Mendocino County, California, United States. It is located on the South Fork of the Eel River, 9 miles (14 km) north-northwest of Leggett, at an elevation of 794 feet (242 m).

The first post office at Piercy opened in 1920. The name honors Sam Piercy, who settled there circa 1900.

== Climate ==
This region experiences warm (but not hot) and dry summers, with no average monthly temperatures above 71.6 °F (22.0 °C). According to the Köppen Climate Classification system, Piercy has a warm-summer Mediterranean climate, abbreviated Csb on climate maps.

== Notable events ==
The town hosted the Jerry Garcia Band a number of times throughout the late 1980s to 1990, captured in the 2019 six-CD release titled Electric on the Eel.
