= California Points of Historical Interest =

California Points of Historical Interest are sites, buildings, features, or events that are of local significance to a county or city's history.

Points of Historical Interest designated after December 1997 are listed in the California Register of Historical Resources.

== Criteria ==
To be eligible for designation as a Point of Historical Interest, a resource must meet at least one of the following criteria:

1. The first, last, only, or most significant of its type in a region;
2. Relating to people or groups that have influenced local history; or
3. A significant work in the local region of a pioneer architect, designer or master builder.

== Selected points ==
- Bob's Big Boy Restaurant of Burbank, California (est. 1949, designated 1993)
- Confusion Hill (est. 1949, designated 2010)
- Forest Theater (est. 1910)
- Golden Bough Playhouse (est. 1952)
- Highland Springs Ranch & Inn (est. 1884)
- Moss Beach Distillery (est. 1927)
- Old Santa Susana Stage Road
- Virginia Robinson Gardens

== See also ==
- Bibliography of California history
- California Historical Landmark
- List of California Historical Landmarks
- California Register of Historical Resources
