= Theodore J. Hoover Natural Preserve =

Nature reserve in California, USA

Coordinates: 37.0963°N 122.2782°W

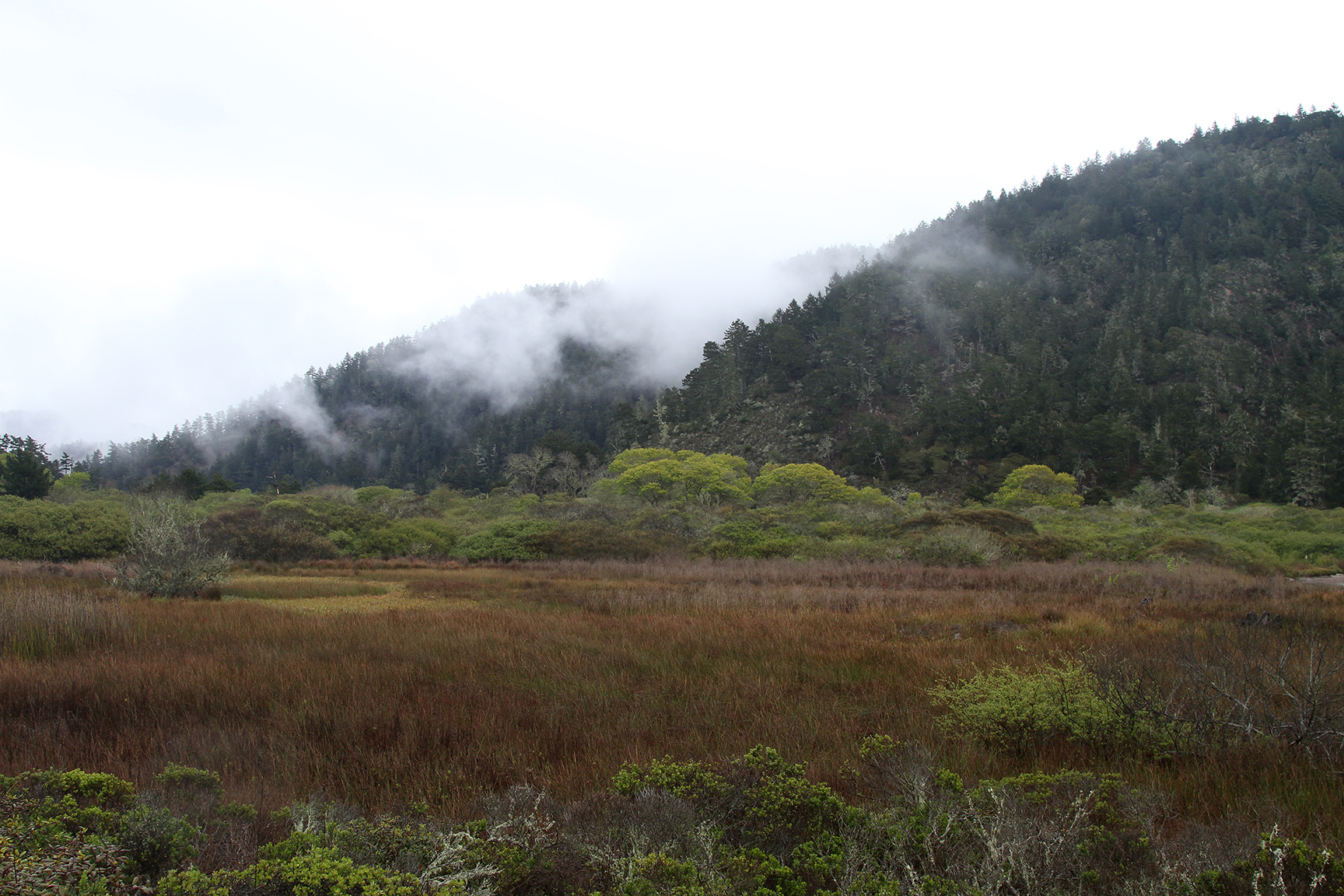
The Rancho Del Oso section of the Big Basin Redwoods State Park, including Waddell Marsh, from the Skyline-to-the-Sea Trail

Theodore J. Hoover Natural Preserve, which includes Waddell Marsh, is located at the mouth of Waddell Creek, a coastal freshwater marsh that is one of the rarest habitats on the Central Coast of California. This marsh is one of the few relatively undisturbed bodies of fresh water left along the West coast. The land is 23 acres of wetland habitat. It is part of the Rancho del Oso Big Basin Redwoods State Park, located approximately 65 miles south of San Francisco. The elevation in the park ranges from sea level to over 2,000 feet. The area was named after William W. Waddell, who established the last of his four sawmills there in 1868. The sawmill ran down after his death in 1875. All the boilers were left in the area; they are now completely surrounded by second-growth redwoods. Other trees found in the park are conifers, and oaks. Within the park there are different vegetation types to be seen, such as chaparral, redwood forests, and riparian habitats.

== Animals ==
This habitat shelters many rare and endangered species such as the California red-legged frog, western pond turtle, tidewater goby, black rail, San Francisco garter snake, coho salmon (endangered) and steelhead (threatened). Hikers can also look out for feral pigs and red foxes around the park. The park is also home to more than 200 species of native and migratory birds such as ducks, sparrows, wrens, kingfishers, Swainson’s thrush, and warblers. In the park there are also many species of water birds, such as avocets, stilts, herons, and egrets. The most common mammals to be seen are black-tailed deer, chipmunks, squirrels and raccoons. Also, although not as regularly seen, the park is also home to skunks, bobcats, coyotes, and mountain lions. While there are not many fish in the streams, there are multiple species of reptiles and amphibians living in the streams and in the marsh. Park-goers are able to see the California newt, the Pacific tree frog, the western skink, the western toad and the alligator lizard. There is also a harbor seal rookery just south of the beach. Working with experts from other areas, the Waddell Creek Association hopes to educate the public about wetlands, their value and necessity.

== Park usage ==
After William Waddell’s death, the main uses for the land became farming and ranching. In 1977, California State Parks took possession of the majority of the land, combining it with the Big Basin Redwoods State Park to make a large, continuous park. This new land connected from the redwoods all the way to the ocean. The park’s main uses now are hiking, hang gliding, and bird watching. At the beach within the preserve, available activities include windsurfing, kite surfing, surf fishing, surfing, and boogie boarding.

== Skyline-to-the-Sea Trail ==
The Skyline-to-the-Sea Trail threads its way through Big Basin Redwoods State Park along Waddell Creek to the ocean at Waddell Beach, a freshwater marsh adjacent called Theodore J. Hoover Natural Preserve.This trail has been considered by some to be one of the best overnight hikes in California. At the entrance to the preserve there is no admittance fee, and no parking fee. The park requires that hikers stay at a different camp every night, and reservations to camp must be made far in advanced.

== History ==
The preserve is located in northern Santa Cruz County just one mile south of the San Mateo County line. It is named after Theodore J. Hoover, dean of engineering at Stanford University, and brother of President Hoover, whose family purchased Rancho del Oso in 1914, both for the purpose of building a family home and because of Theodore’s interest in the conservation of natural resources. The land was previously owned by the Ocean Shore Land and Investment Company. The company had intended to use the land to build a train from San Francisco to Santa Cruz. Hoover had owned the upper part of the valley, so when the plans for the train fell through, he bought the rest of it. Both Hoover, who died in 1955, and his wife who died in 1940, are buried in the valley.

== Notes ==
- Waddell Creek Beach and Rancho del Oso, A Guide to Birding in Santa Cruz County, California, (pp.41-43)
