= Sanborn County Park =

County park in the Santa Cruz Mountains, California, USA

Coordinates: 37°14′30″N 122°5′15″W

Sanborn County Park is a 3,453 acre (13.97 km^{2}) county park situated in the Santa Cruz Mountains, managed by the Santa Clara County Parks and Recreation Department. The deeply forested park features over 15 miles of trails, second-growth redwoods, and creeks that flow year-round. It offers hiking, RV camping, walk-in campsites, and picnicking/BBQ sites. In the summer months, Sanborn County Park hosts the only outdoor Shakespearean company in Silicon Valley.

The park is located four miles west of the town of Saratoga and straddles the steep slopes of the Santa Cruz Mountains from Sanborn Road all the way up to Skyline Boulevard. Adjacent properties include the Walden West Environmental Education Center, Castle Rock State Park, the Los Altos Rod and Gun Club Range and the Santa Clara County Peace Officers Association gun range.

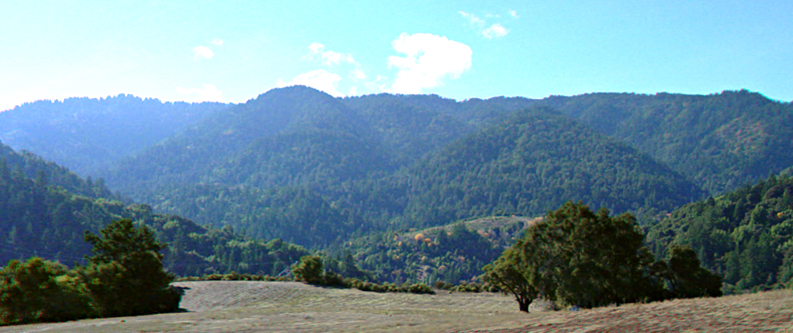
Sanborn County Park and the San Andreas Rift Valley are behind the ridge on the left in this view from the Mountain Winery parking lot a few miles north.

== Practical information ==
The park is open year-round, although there is no entry after sunset. Sanborn County Park is located on Sanborn Road. From the city of Saratoga, proceed two miles (3 km) west on Highway 9 to Sanborn Road, thence turning left onto Sanborn Road, traveling one mile (1.6 km) to the park entrance. Overnight camping is permitted and RV use is allowed for a limited number of vehicles at designated locations. Pets must be leashed and are permitted in picnic and RV areas, and most trails. There are entry fees collected at all times. There are strictly enforced rules prohibiting the picking of vegetation or damaging of trees. All facilities are not handicapped accessible, although there is an all-access trail emanating from the visitor center. Picnic tables and some grassy lawn areas are available in a very small portion of the park.

== History ==
The site was long-visited by native Americans including the Ohlone people as evidenced by the grinding slab which forms half of the entry gate of to the rustic mansion on site. This log-style house was built in 1908 by the Honorable James R. Welch, Superior Court Judge for Santa Clara County as a summer retreat for his family. The judge added orchards and modified a sag pond into a decorative pond with a waterfall. In the 1956 the property was purchased by "America's Uranium King", Vernon J. Pick, who established a 200-person electronics company on site and named it Walden West after the cabin by a pond in Henry David Thoreau's book Walden.

Sanborn County Park was purchased in the late 1970s in an expansionary era of the Santa Clara County Parks and Recreation Department under the leadership of Robert Amery and Charles Rockwell. A series of land acquisitions throughout the county, with the intention to develop a greatly expanded set of county parks emphasizing large land area and low intensity uses. The Sanborn County Park master plan was developed in this era. The county retained Earth Metrics Inc. to prepare an Environmental Impact Report (EIR) for the land use change, pursuant to requirements of the California Environmental Quality Act. Fairly soon thereafter the County Board of Supervisors approved the park plan and began development of necessary road and trail improvements.

From 1976 to 2010 the main house was the site of the Sanborn Park Hostel, entirely renovated by volunteers, which was proud to charge the lowest rate of any hostel in the United States ($14/night at the time of closing). The hostel was forced to close in the face of increasing insurance costs and reduced international travel after 9/11.

== Sanborn Science and Nature Center ==
Opened in 1982, the Youth Science Institute - Sanborn Science and Nature Center is a science and nature education facility operated by the Youth Science Institute. The center features live animals found in the Santa Cruz Mountains, earthquake and geology exhibits, an arthropod zoo and a regional plant garden. The center offers nature and science school and group programs, after-school science and summer camp programs. The center hosts an annual Insect Fair in May.

== Overview for hikers ==
Exposed on the steep canyon eastern slopes of the Santa Cruz Mountains, Sanborn County Park has one of the coolest summer climates of Santa Clara County's parks. Towering redwood forests add to this eastern slope exposure in keeping hiking trails comfortable in the heavy use period, from June to September; moreover, there are abundant mixed forest locales having Coast live oak, Pacific madrone, Big leaf maple and Tanbark oak.

The park features the first segment of the regional Bay Area Ridge Trail in Santa Clara County, which extends along the ridge of the Santa Cruz Mountains to become the Skyline-to-the-Sea Trail, which continues to the Pacific Ocean. This Bay Area Ridge Trail ultimately circumnavigates the entire Bay Area at a length of 500 miles (800 km). The Sanborn and San Andreas trails ascend the eastern mountain slope, eventually joining the Cactus to Clouds Trail (AKA Skyline Trail) and Skyline Boulevard. Summit Rock, which is an established rock-climbing venue offers a panoramic outlook over Saratoga and the South Bay, lies at the upper limit of the park, but is readily reached from the Skyline Boulevard side.

At the southeastern corner of Sanborn County Park sits Lake Ranch Reservoir, an attractive tiny mountain lake, accessible via either a steep canyon trail at the terminus of Sanborn Road, or by way of a longer, more level trail originating at Black Road. The latter trail, which sinuates high up along the flanks of Lyndon Canyon, is a lightly used trail, but extremely lush and forested; it crosses numerous small riparian zones, whose creeks tumble into the steep-sided canyon, originally formed by the San Andreas Fault. Shorter, less strenuous trails extend through the redwood stands and along creeksides within the lower reaches of Sanborn County Park.

== Vegetation ==
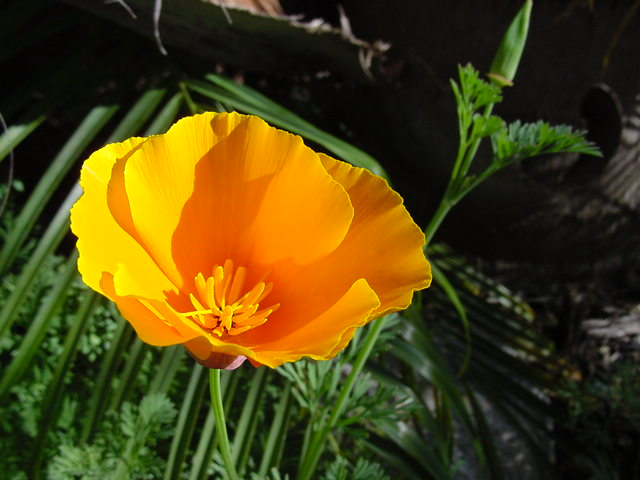
California poppy

Toyon, a common native shrub in Sanborn County Park.

Besides the tree species noted above, the park contains a variety of native plants, first surveyed in the Earth Metrics EIR. Examples of this flora are:

- Blue elderberry, Sambucus mexicana
- California maidenhair fern, Adiantum jordanii
- California mugwort, Artemisia douglasiana
- California poppy, Eschscholzia californica, the state flower
- Elk clover, Aralia californica
- Flowering currant, Ribes sanguineum
- Miniature lupine, Lupinus bicolor
- Miner's lettuce, Claytonia perfoliata
- Poison oak, Toxicodendron diversilobum
- Slender tarweed, Madia gracilis
- Sticky cinquefoil, Potentilla glandulosa
- Toyon, Heteromeles arbutifolia

== Geology ==
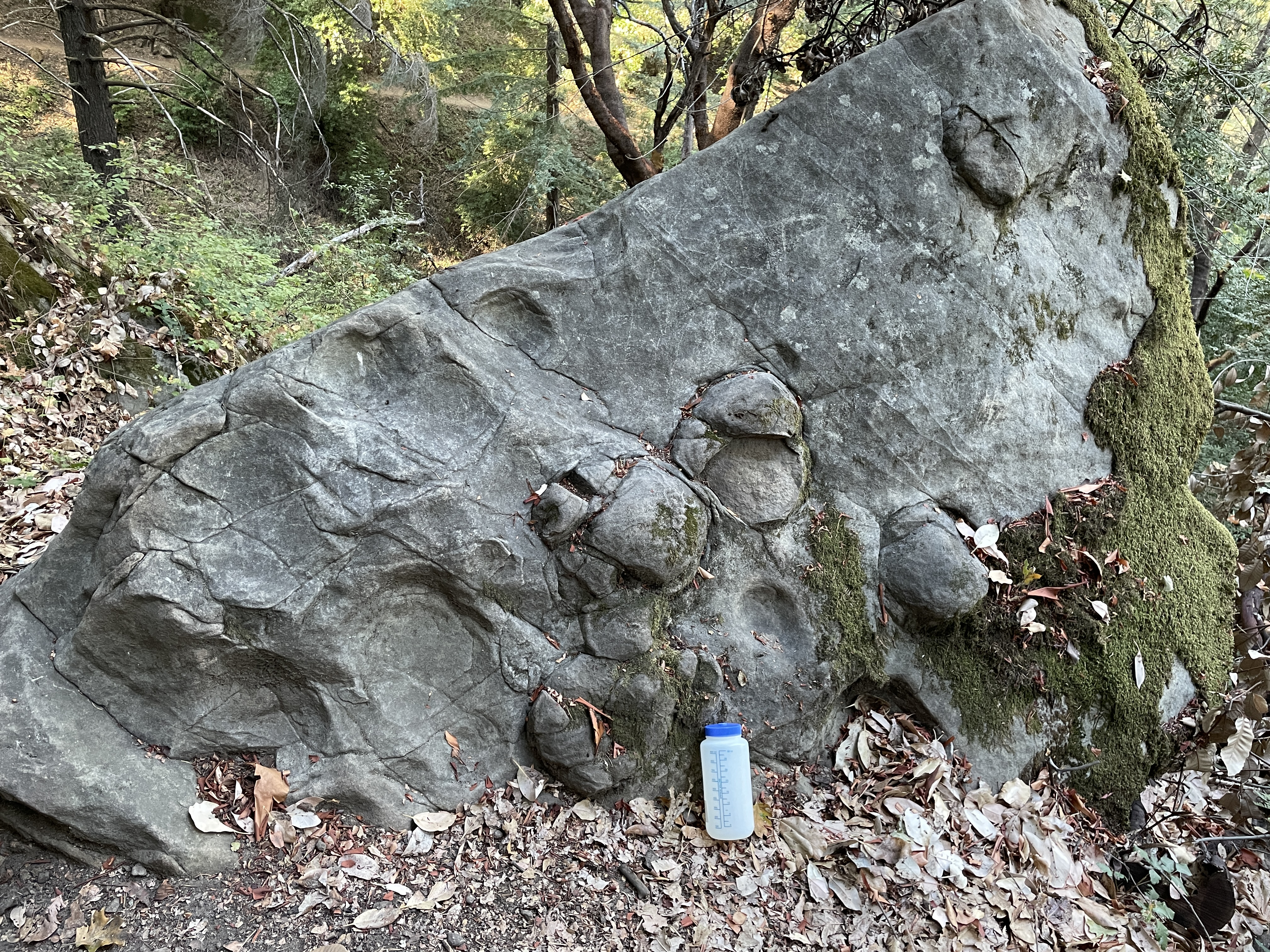
Vaqueros Formation sandstone showing concretions

The San Andreas Fault runs directly under the park. The entrance station and main parking lots are on the North American Plate. As you walk uphill across the broad sloping lawn you are crossing the fault zone. The fault is not visible below your feet as it is covered by an alluvial fan of material that have eroded from the mountain. Once you reach the kiosk at the bottom of the campsite path you have crossed over to the Pacific Plate. In terms of fault blocks you parked the car on the New Almaden Block which featured rocks of the Franciscan Complex. You are now standing on the Salinian Block which features sandstones of the Vaqueros and San Lorenzo formations.

Subtle evidence for earthquake activity may be found at numerous locations within the park as described in USGS publication "Where's the San Andreas Fault? A Guidebook to Tracing the Fault on Public Lands in the San Francisco Bay Region", chapters 5 and 6. The guide shows where to spot evidence of offset drainages, fault scarps, stream capture, shutter ridges, and sag ponds as you venture through the park.

== See also ==
- California Floristic Province
- Silicon Valley
