= Skyline-to-the-Sea Trail =

Hiking trail in the Santa Cruz Mountains

Coordinates: 37.1755175°N 122.236644°W

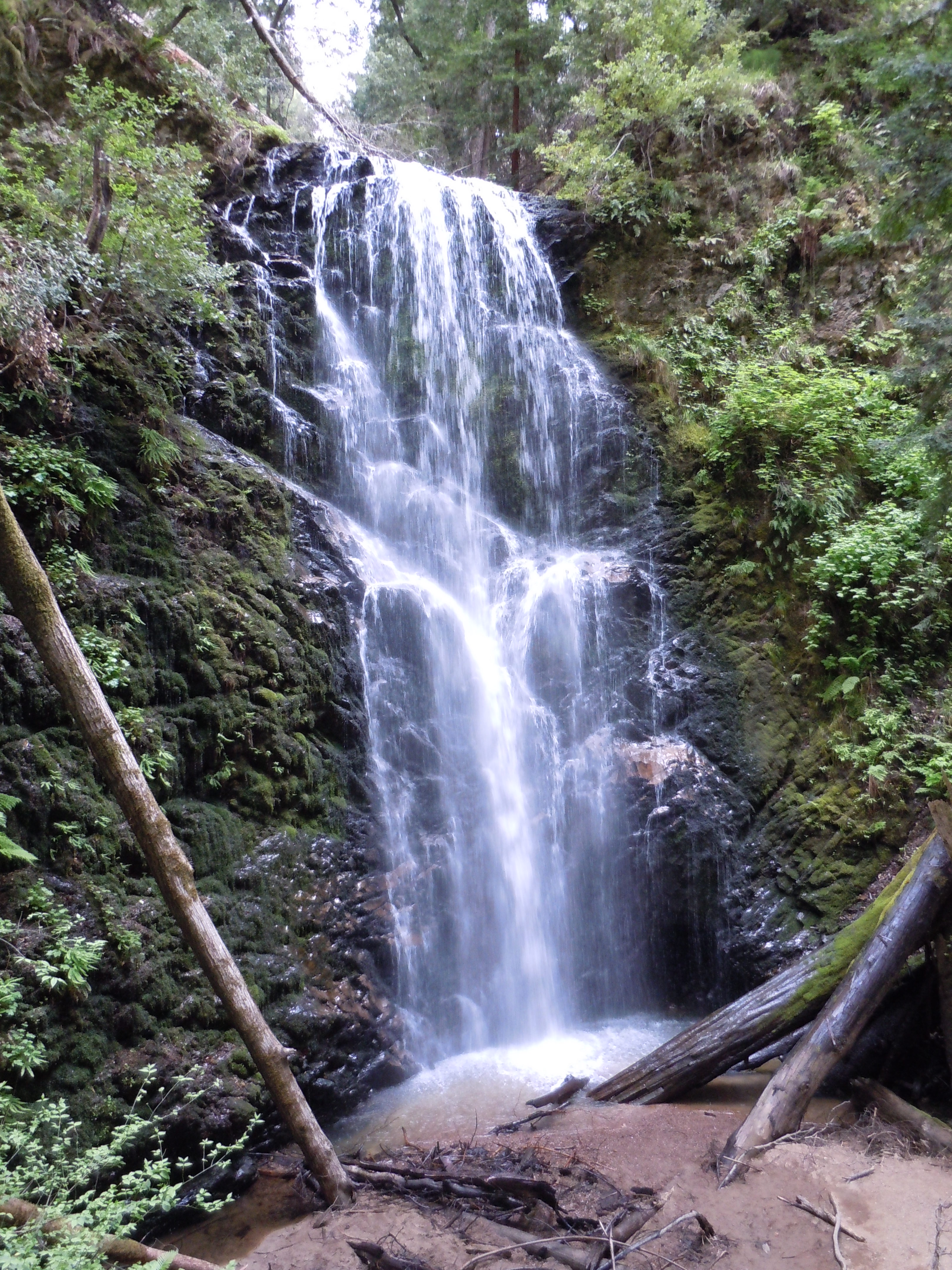
- The 70 ft. (21 m) Berry Creek Falls, as seen from the wooden viewing platform
- Length: 29.5 mi (47.5 km)
- Location: Santa Cruz County, California, USA
- Trailheads: Saratoga Gap, California; Waddell Beach, Pacific Ocean Castle Rock State Park California
- Use: Hiking
- Elevation change: 2,600 ft (790 m)
- Highest point: Saratoga Gap, 2,600 ft (790 m)
- Lowest point: Waddell Beach, 0 ft (0 m)
- Difficulty: Moderate
- Season: May 1st through November 1st
- Sights: Castle Rock State Park; Big Basin State Park
- Hazards: Severe Weather

The Skyline-to-the-Sea Trail is a 29.5-mile (47.5 km) hiking trail that descends from the ridge of the Santa Cruz Mountains in California to the Pacific Ocean, passing through Castle Rock State Park and Big Basin Redwoods State Park. Big Basin is California's oldest state park. In August 2020, the CZU Lightning Complex fires damaged much of the route and the lower third of the trail remains mostly closed.

== History ==
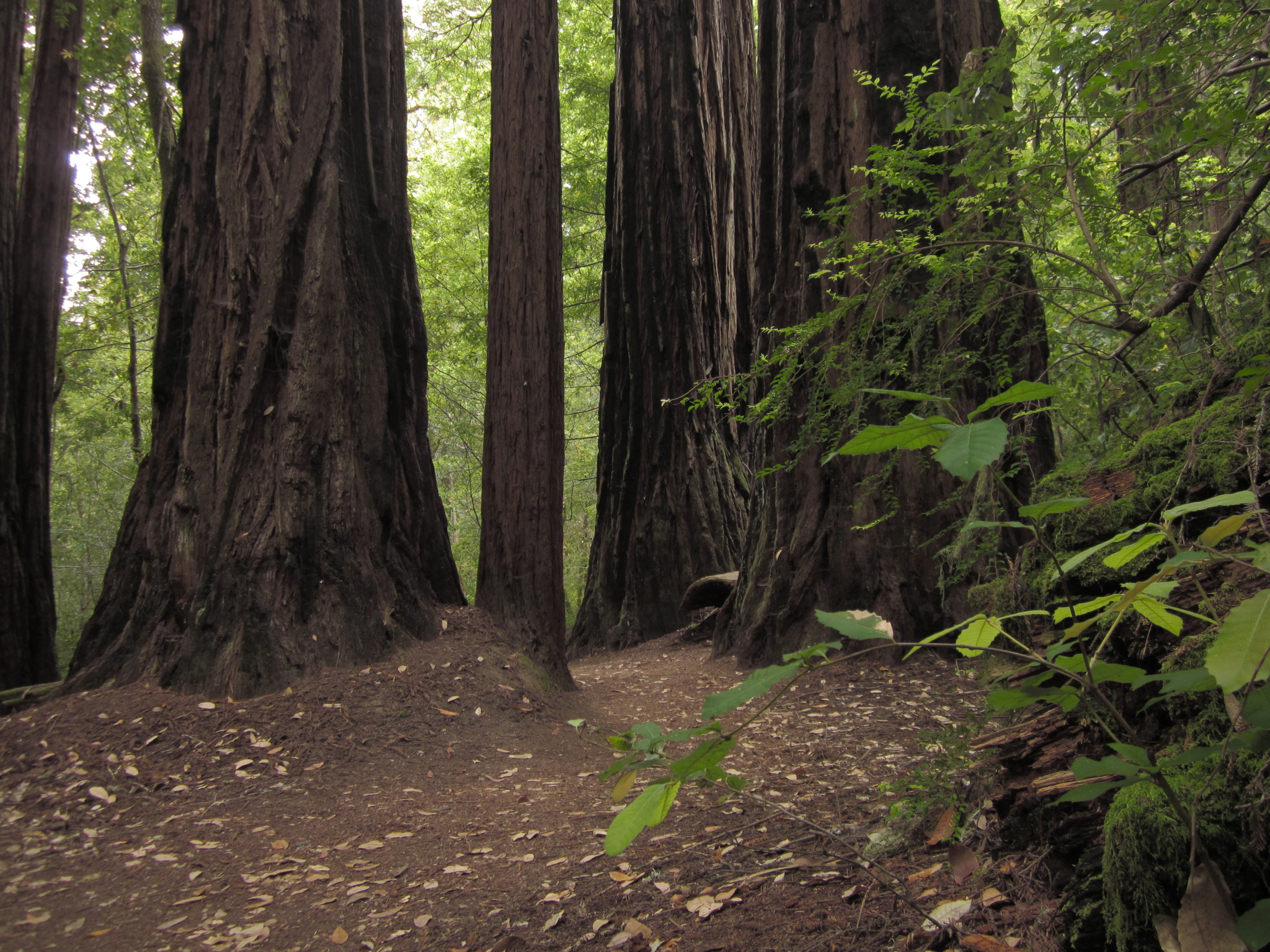
The Skyline-to-the-Sea Trail passing through a stand of California Redwood trees.

The trail was started in 1969 by the Sempervirens Fund of Conservation Associates of the Sierra Club and was extended to the Pacific by 1978 with the acquisition of the Hoover Ranch near Waddell Beach. Planning began in 1968, with the initial trail segment to follow the state-controlled right-of-way along SR 9, linking Saratoga Gap to Big Basin. A "trail breaking party" was scheduled for April 1969; local Boy Scouts participated in building the trail. During that event, the first of what would become annual "Trail Days" cleanups, nearly 2,500 volunteers cleared and created almost 45 mi (72 km) of trails, including the first segment of Skyline-to-the-Sea.

The final segment, extending the western terminus to the Pacific Ocean at Waddell Beach, opened to the public in July 1978. It traverses the Rancho del Oso area of Big Basin, which was acquired by the state in 1977. Prior to the expansion of Big Basin, individual permission was required to follow the trail to the sea over private lands. The Sempervirens Fund launched a new project in 1979 to acquire an additional 45 acres (18 ha) of land for the trail, with the goal of relocating it further away from SR 9.

After the August 2020 CZU Lightning Complex fires, the trail closed, along with much of Big Basin Redwoods State Park. As of February 2025, the lower third of the trail remains mostly closed and its future is unclear; some portions of the trail have been reopened, but no overnight camping is allowed.

== Route ==
Key locations on and near the Skyline-to-the-Sea Trail
1 Saratoga Gap trailhead
2 Castle Rock park entrance & parking (alternate trailhead)
3 Waterman Gap Trail Camp
4 Redwood Loop trailhead / Jay Trail Camp / Big Basin park headquarters
5 Berry Creek Falls
6 Sunset Trail Camp
8 Waddell Beach trailhead

The trail begins at Saratoga Gap on the ridge at the intersection of SR 9 and Skyline Boulevard (SR 35). The trail parallels SR 9 through Castle Rock, crosses the highway, and then follows SR 236 to Big Basin park headquarters. It then descends through Big Basin, following Waddell Creek to its outlet at Waddell Beach, for a total distance of approximately 25 mi (40 km).

However, many hikers actually begin further southeast at Castle Rock due to its overnight parking facility; starting from Castle Rock, hikers first use the Saratoga Gap Trail, then the Travertine Springs Trail, joining Skyline-to-the-Sea at Beekhuis Road; this adds approximately 3 mi (4.8 km) to the total hiking distance.

The trail usually takes two to three days to complete, with nearly all thru-hikers traveling towards the ocean; typically hikers would camp overnight at Waterman Gap, approximately 6 mi (9.7 km) from Saratoga Gap, and then at Jay Camp, near the Big Basin headquarters, approximately 9 mi (14 km) from Waterman Gap. Many hikers like to take a detour up Berry Creek Trail to see the waterfalls or to camp at Sunset Trail Camp, adding 2.7 mi (4.3 km) to the hike. It is possible to walk the entire trail in one day, though this is unusual and very difficult.

A 50 km (31 mi) ultramarathon is held on this trail, over the east-to-west route starting from Saratoga Gap, one or two times per year, which features an elevation gain of 3,000 ft (910 m) and loss of 5,880 ft (1,790 m). As of 2020, the 50K course record is 3:40:43, set in 2016.

=== Access ===
Santa Cruz Metro routes 35 and 40 formerly connected Big Basin State Park Headquarters and Waddell Creek, respectively, to Pacific Metro Center. Starting in fall 2011, Route 35 eliminated weekend service to Big Basin and Route 40 was short-turned at Cement Plant Road, eliminating service to Waddell Beach.

Summer weekend service was restored to Big Basin on Route 35 in 2023. Route 35B provides seasonal (spring and summer) service on weekends and holidays to Big Basin Headquarters. Buses depart from the Cavallaro Transit Center in Scotts Valley approximately every two hours between 8 AM and 4 PM, arriving at Big Basin approximately 45 minutes later. Return buses depart from Big Basin with approximately the same two-hour headways, between 8:45 AM and 5 PM.

=== Extensions and connections ===
As of October 2020, there is a 3.6 mi (5.8 km) extension that creates a "Saratoga-to-the-Sea" Trail. The trail originates at Saratoga Quarry Park, and terminates at Sanborn-Skyline County Park. This trail connects to the Skyline-to-the-Sea Trail via a completed section of the Bay Area Ridge Trail. The park is owned by the city of Saratoga's Parks Department.

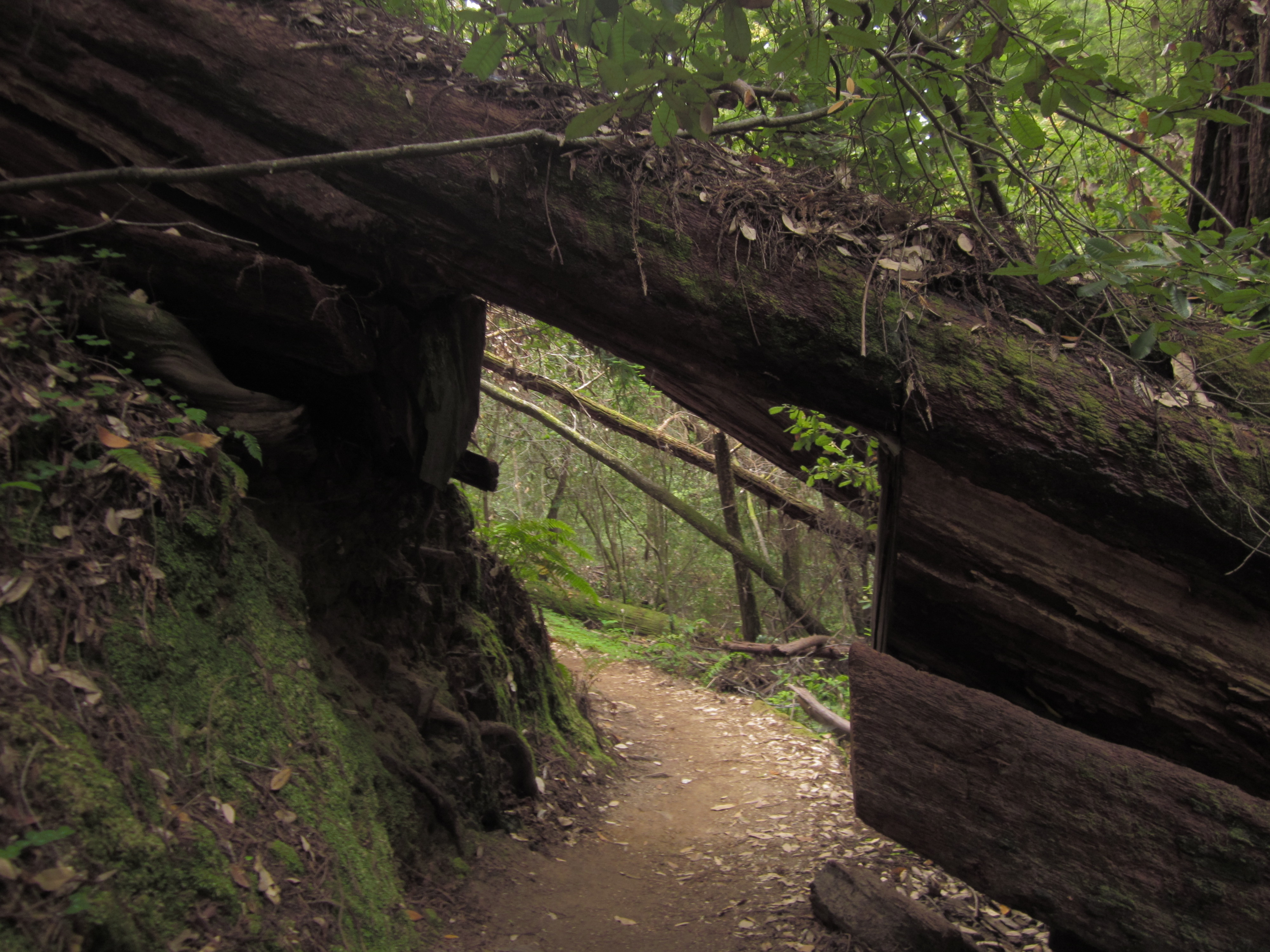
The Skyline-to-the-Sea Trail passing through a fallen California Redwood tree.

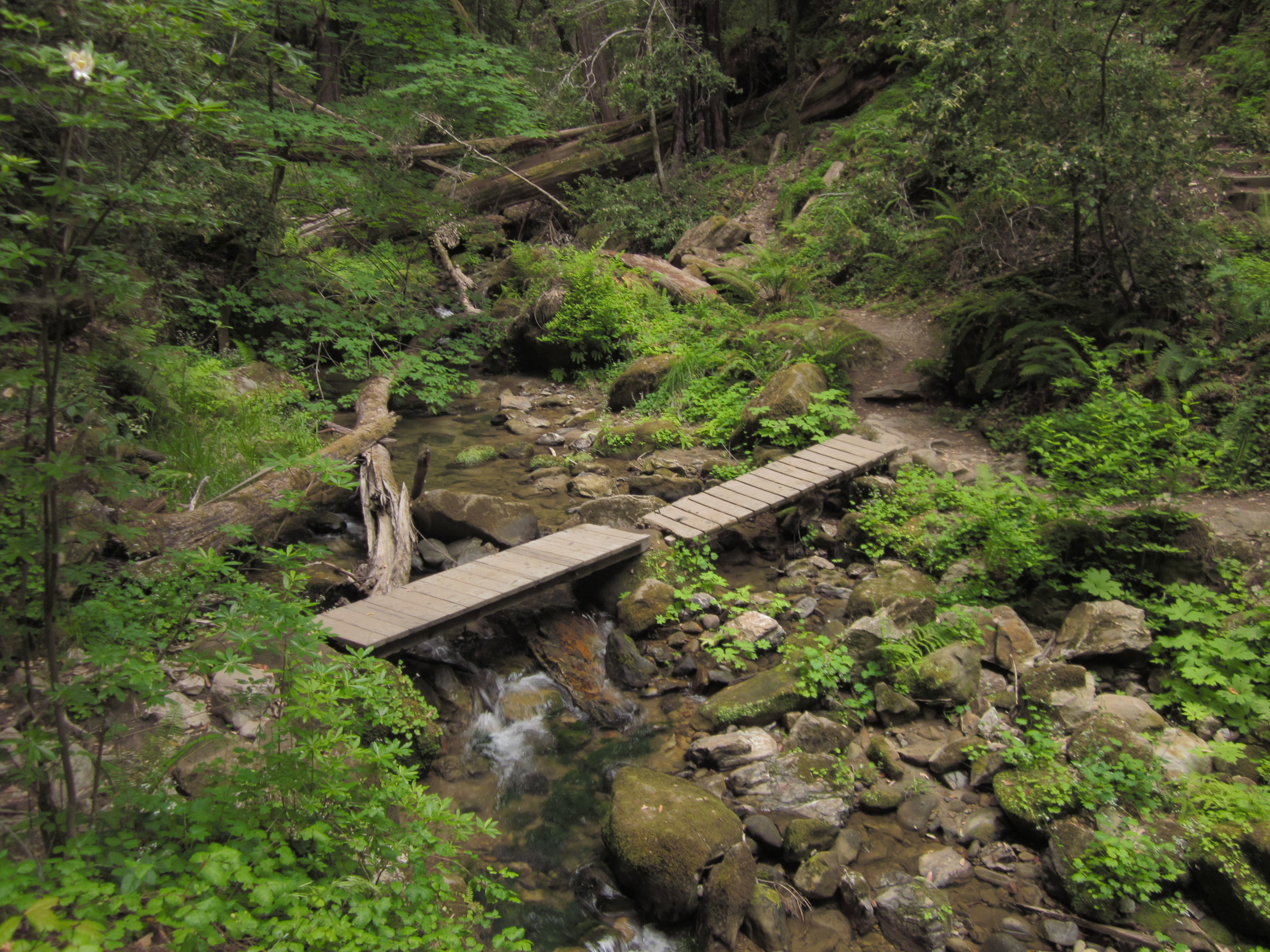
The Skyline-to-the-Sea Trail passing over West Waddell Creek.
