= Saratoga Gap Open Space Preserve =

Regional park in California, United States

Coordinates: 37.2667835°N 122.1293151°W

Saratoga Gap Open Space Preserve is a 1,540-acre (620 ha) regional park located near Saratoga Gap in the Santa Cruz Mountains of Santa Clara County, California. The preserve is owned and operated by the Midpeninsula Regional Open Space District. The preserve contains about 2 miles (3 km) of hiking trails, which are open to equestrians and bicycles.

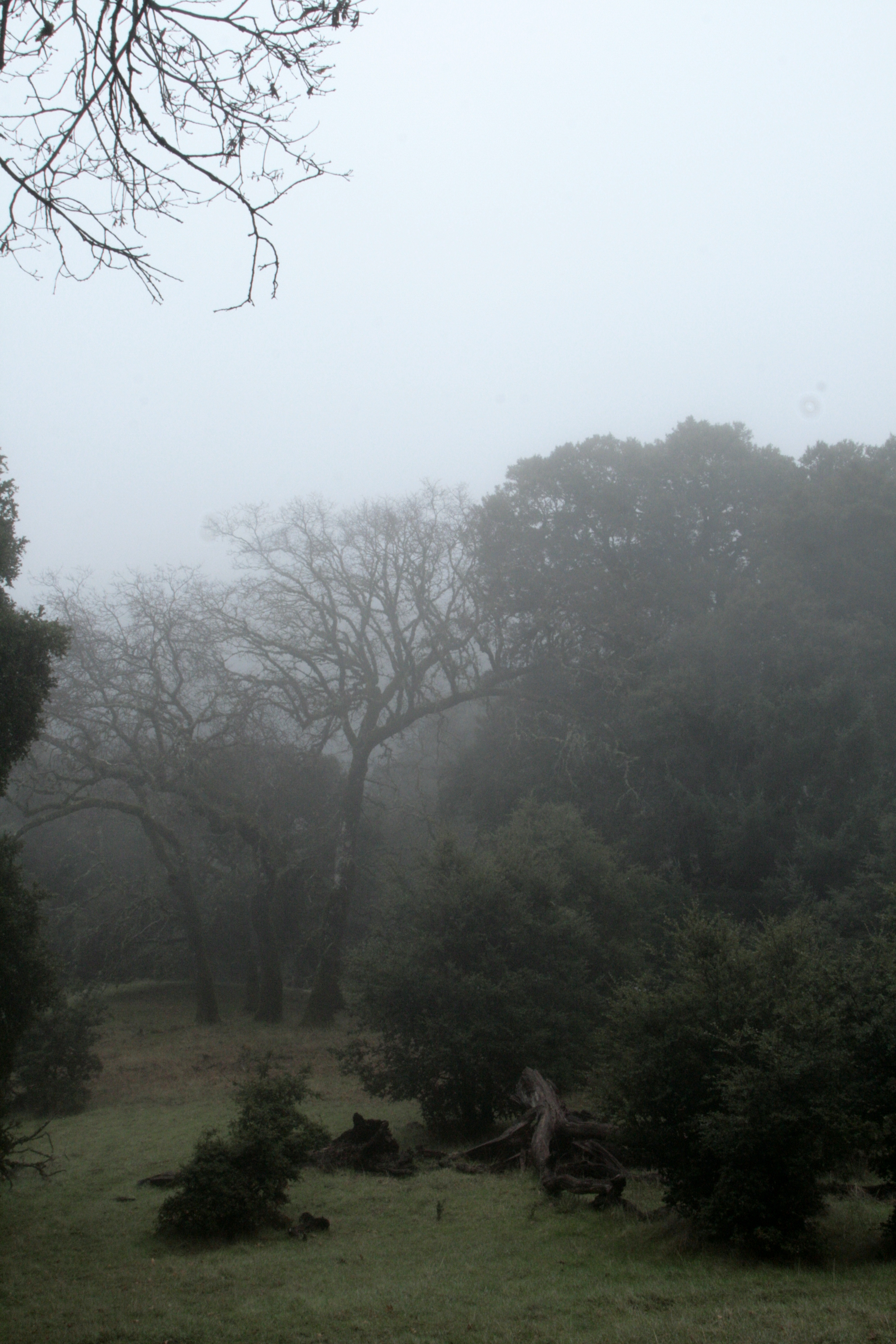
Saratoga Gap Open Space

Saratoga Gap (elevation 2,608 feet (795 m)) contains elements of the Bay Area Ridge Trail, a large and partially complete regional trail.

The preserve is forested with oak and evergreen trees.

== See also ==
- Big Basin Redwoods State Park
- Boulder Creek, California
- Castle Rock State Park
- Saratoga, California
