= Castle Rock State Park (California) =

California state park near Los Gatos

- IUCN category V (protected landscape/seascape)
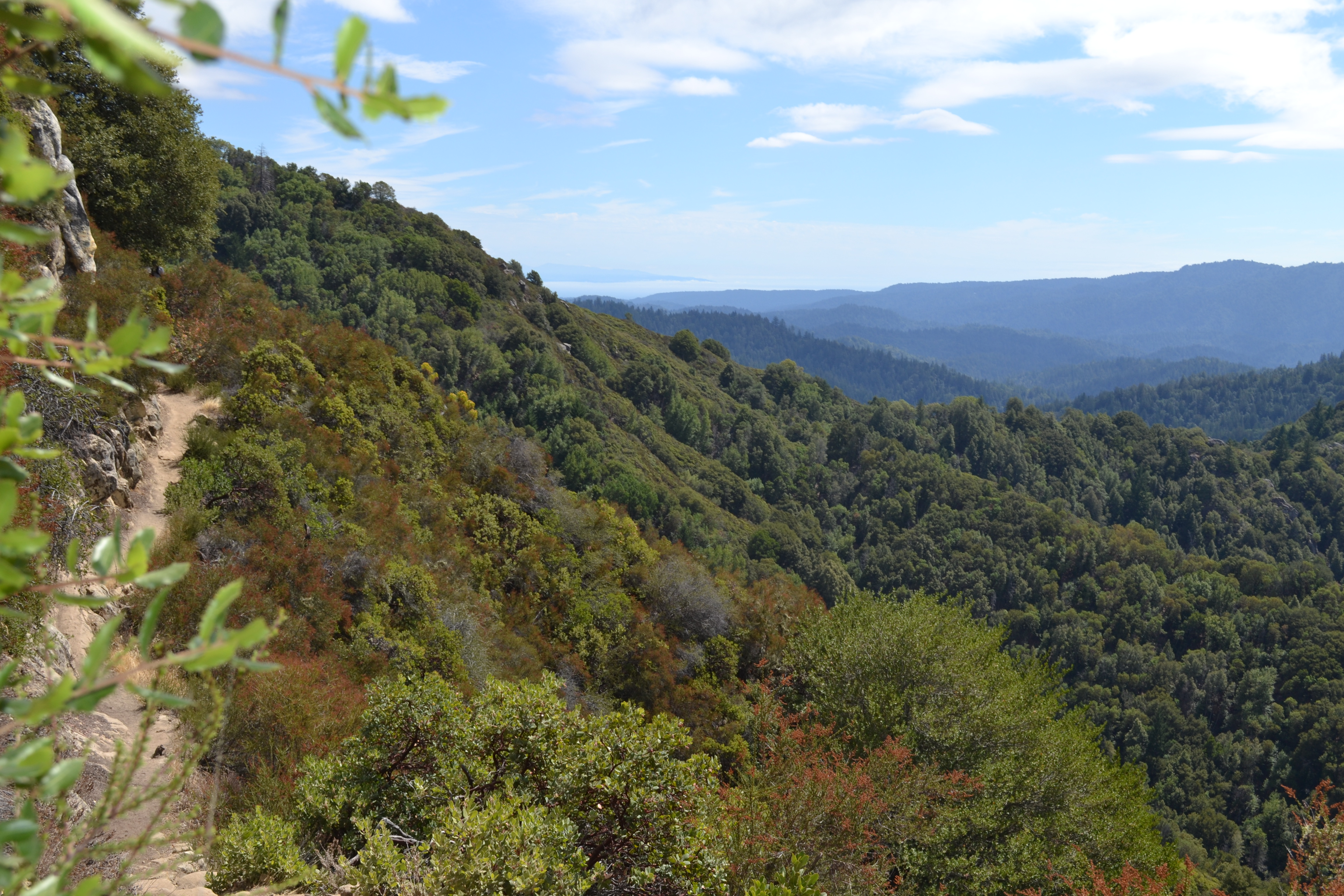
- The Santa Cruz Mountains from Castle Rock State Park, with Monterey Bay in the distance.
- Interactive map of Castle Rock State Park
- Location: Santa Cruz, Santa Clara, and San Mateo Counties, California, United States
- Nearest city: Los Gatos, California
- Coordinates: 37°13′50″N 122°05′44″W
- Area: 5,242 acres (2,121 ha)
- Established: 1968
- Operator: California Department of Parks and Recreation

Castle Rock State Park is a 5,242-acre (2,121 ha) state park of California, United States, located along the crest of the Santa Cruz Mountains and almost entirely in Santa Cruz County, with parts extending into Santa Clara County and San Mateo County. It embraces coast redwood, Douglas fir, and madrone forest, most of which has been left in its wild, natural state. Steep canyons are sprinkled with unusual rock formations that are a popular rock climbing area. The park is named after a sandstone formation called Castle Rock. The forest here is lush and mossy, crisscrossed by 32 miles (51 km) of hiking trails. These trails are part of an even more extensive trail system that links the Santa Clara and San Lorenzo valleys with Castle Rock State Park, Big Basin Redwoods State Park, and the Pacific Coast. Due to its overnight parking lot, Castle Rock is a popular starting point for the Skyline-to-the-Sea Trail, a 30-mile (48 km) trail that begins near by at Saratoga Gap and leads to Waddell Beach north of Santa Cruz. There are two walk-in campgrounds within the park for overnight backpacking.

== Location ==
The entrance to Castle Rock State Park is located on California State Route 35 (Skyline Boulevard) 2.6 miles (4.2 km) southeast of the junction with State Route 9. The park is adjacent to Sanborn County Park (across State Route 35) and the Los Altos Rod and Gun Club Range.

== Usage and activities ==
Castle Rock State Park is suitable for many activities. There are two walk-in campgrounds for overnight hikers, many trails for day-hikes, rock climbing routes, and picnic areas. Dogs are not allowed on the trails or in the campgrounds, and horses allowed only on designated trails.

== History ==
The park was established in 1968.

Under Governor Jerry Brown's 2011 budget proposal this park was going to close. This would have meant that visitors couldn't enter the park, and rangers would no longer staff the park.

California Assembly Bill 42 was signed into law on October 5, 2011. This bill allows state parks to enter into operating agreements with non-profit organizations. The Portola and Castle Rock Foundation has been formed to help support Portola and Castle Rock State Parks.

On March 14, 2012 the park was removed from the state park closure list for a one-year reprieve based on a $250,000 donation by the Sempervirens Fund.

On August 1, 2019, a new park entrance opened, featuring Wi-Fi, picnic areas, 90 parking spaces, and an amphitheater. This parking lot was funded by an 8.7 million dollar donation from the Sempervirens Fund.

== Gallery ==
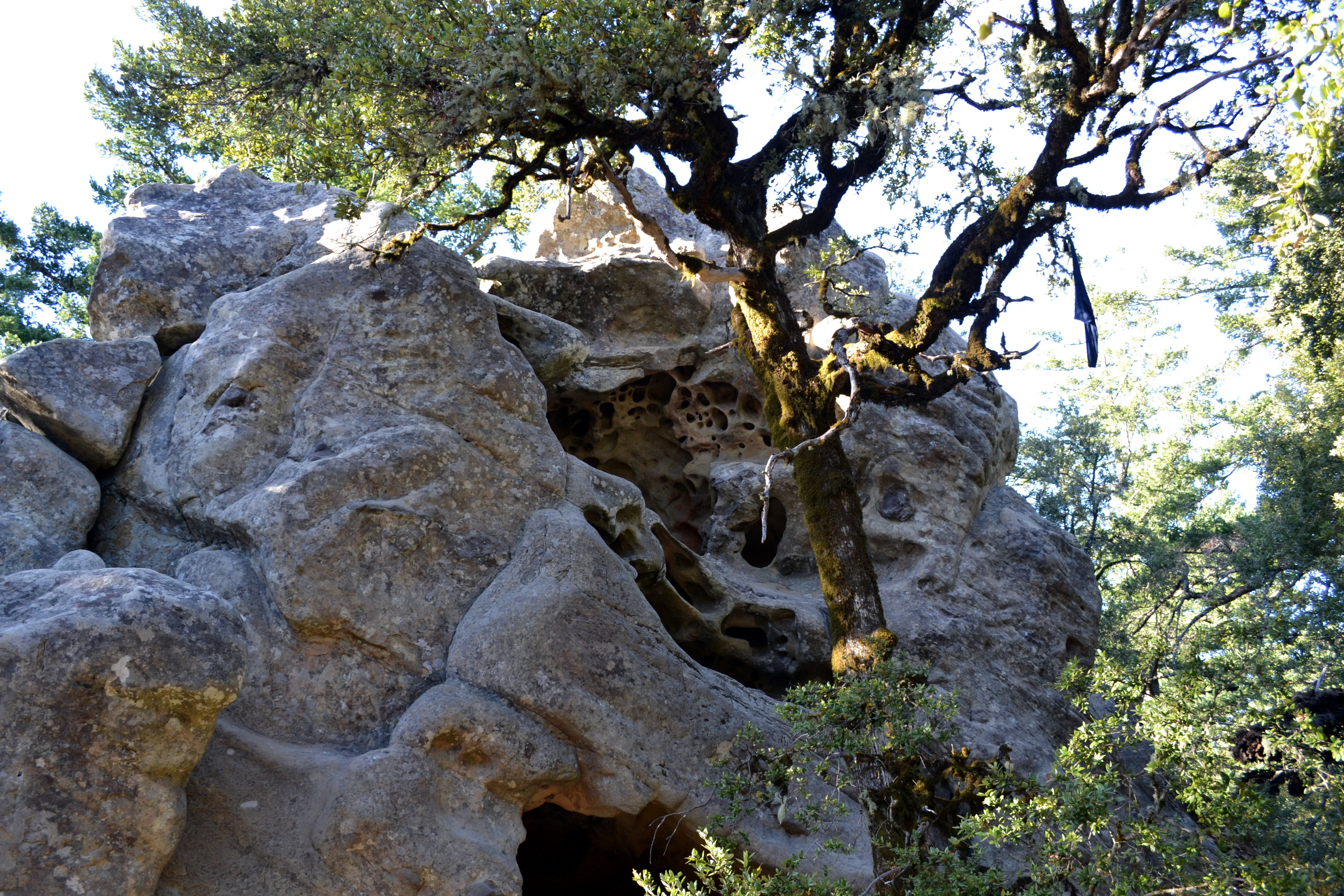
Castle Rock, the park's namesake.

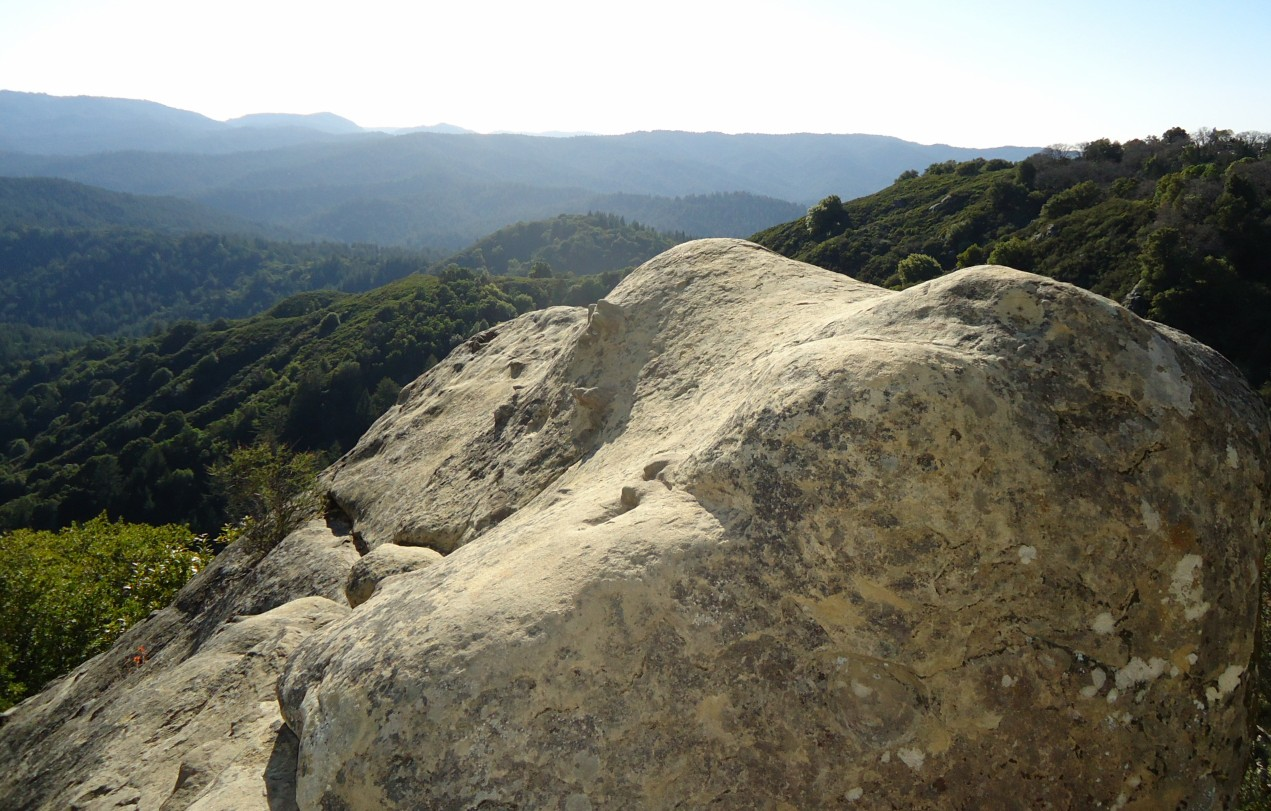
Westward view toward Pacific Ocean from Goat Rock

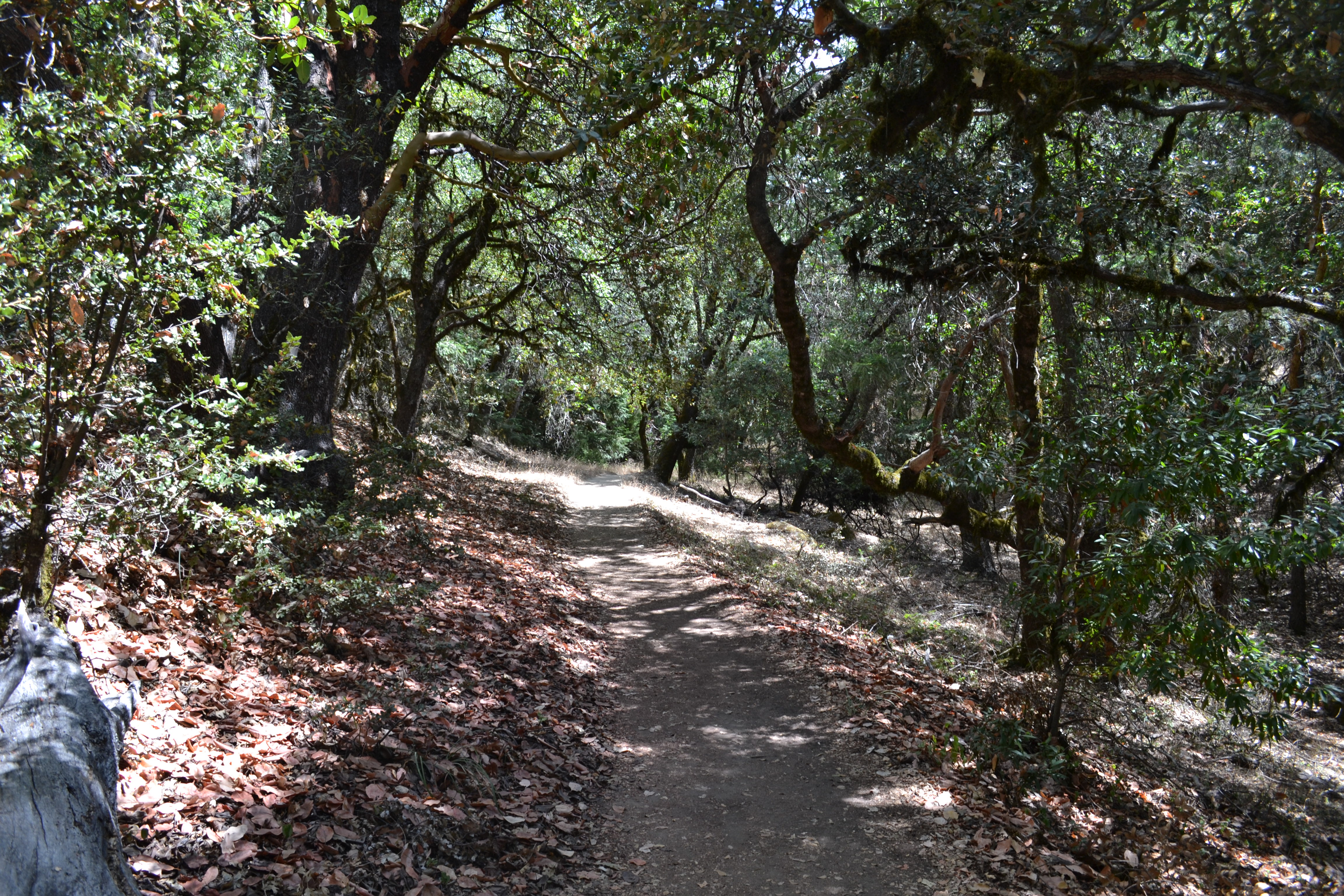
A trail in the park

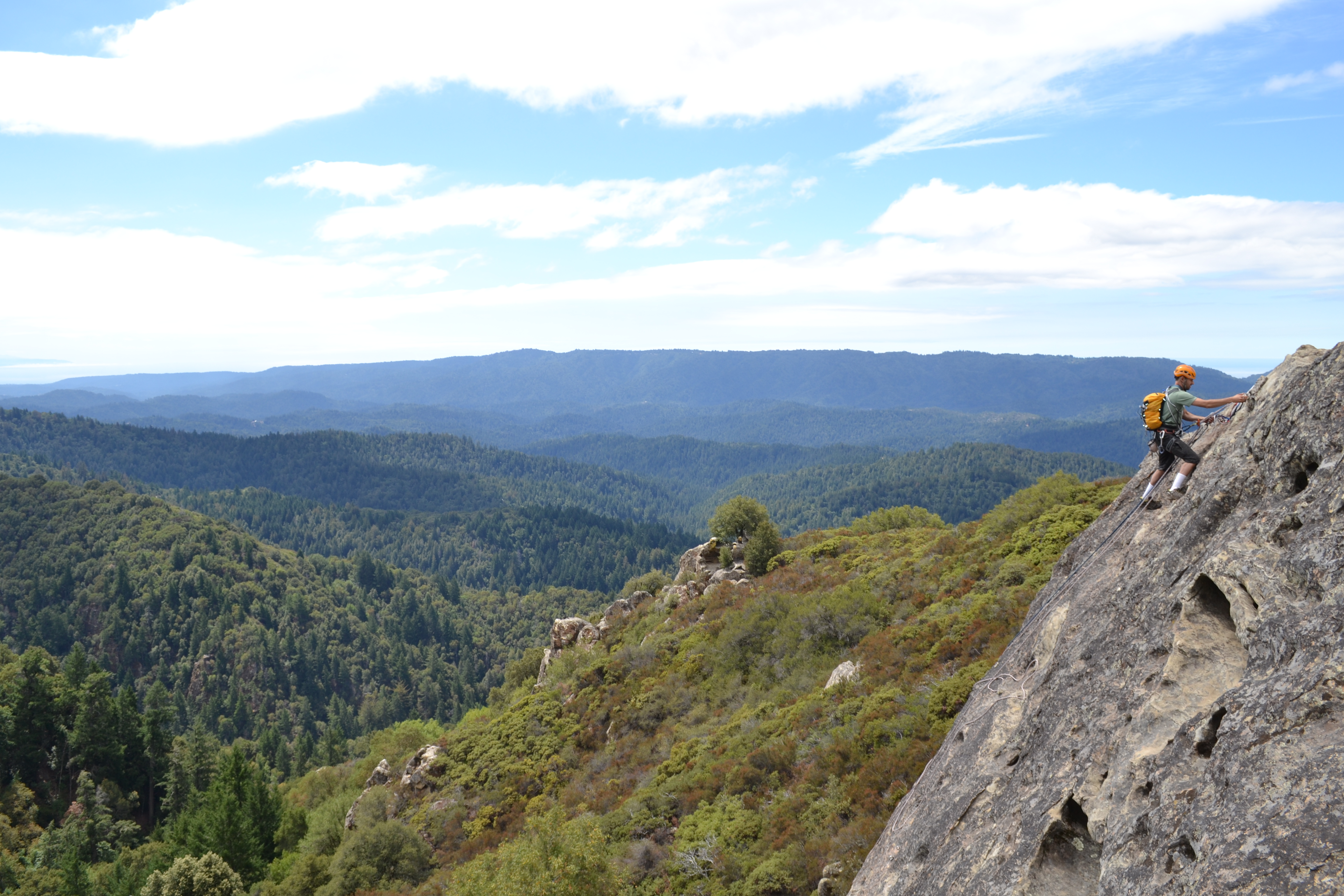
A rock climber

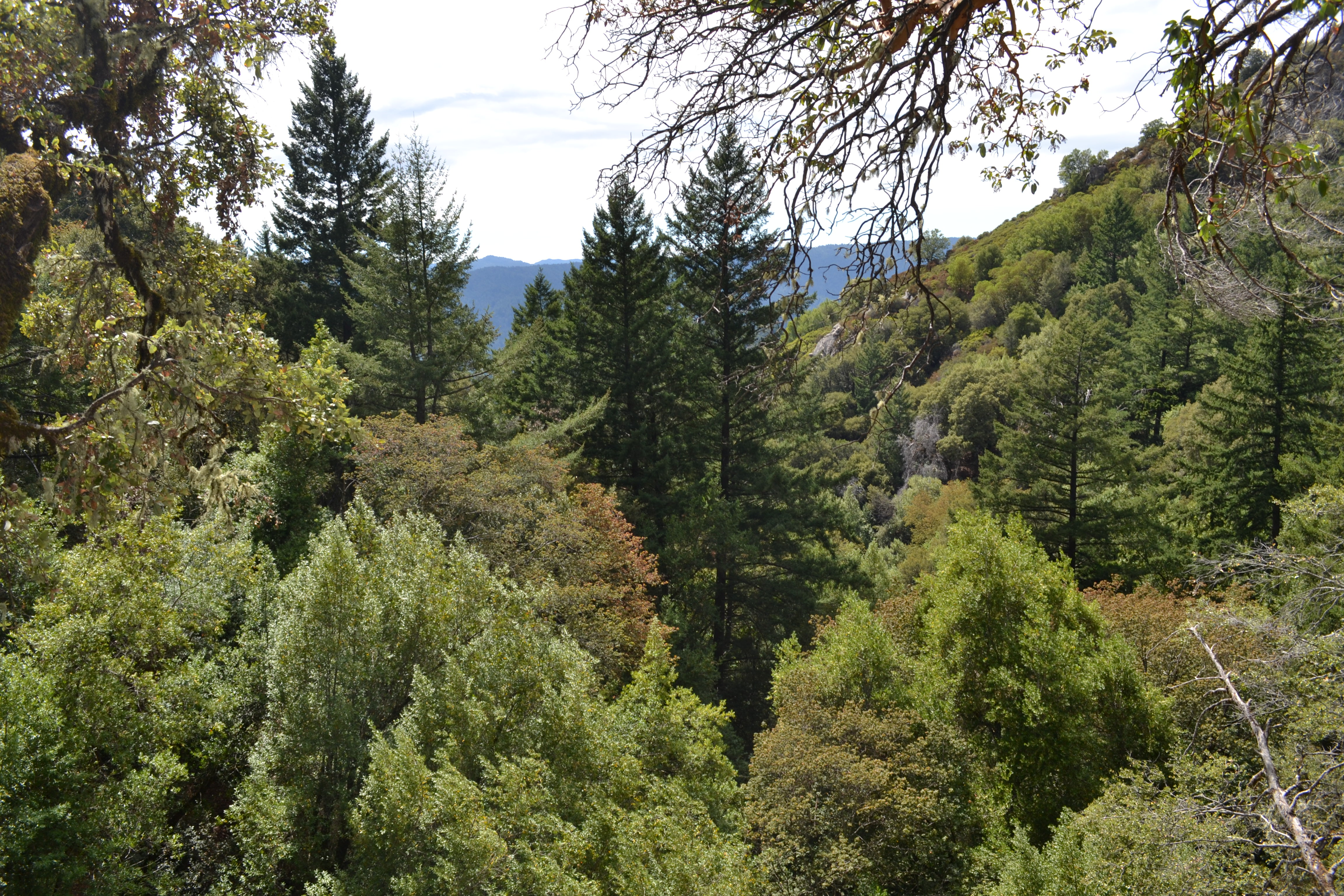
A view of the park

== See also ==
- List of California state parks
