= Rancho Del Oso Nature and History Center =

Coordinates: 37°05′48″N 122°16′32″W

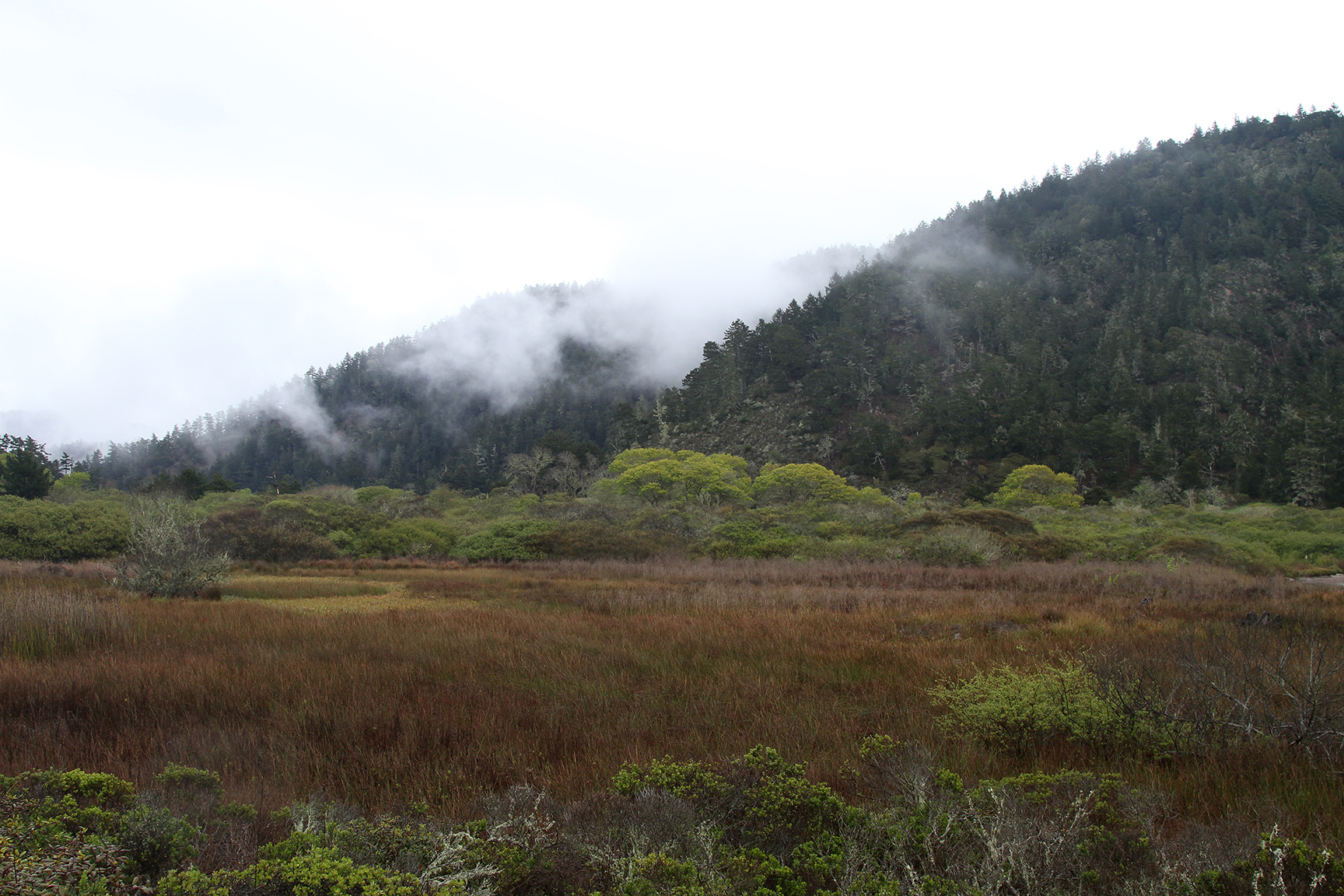
The Rancho Del Oso section of the Big Basin Redwoods State Park, including Waddell Marsh, from the Skyline-to-the-Sea Trail

Rancho Del Oso Nature and History Center interprets the cultural and natural history of the area of Rancho del Oso (ranch of the bear) which became part of California's Big Basin Redwoods State Park, in the 1970s. The center is located on Highway 1 16 miles north of Santa Cruz, California.

Rancho del Oso has trails that traverse the park habitats. There are soggy marshes, grassy meadows, gurgling creeks, hardwood forests and pine forests. There are ancient redwood groves and cascading waterfalls. Trails vary greatly in length from one mile to 13 miles.

The area is a newer section of Big Basin. It is located on the coast of the Pacific Ocean at Waddell Beach, where the Waddell Creek watershed drains from the Santa Cruz Mountains into the sea. The site is also near the end of the hiking enthusiast's Skyline-to-the-Sea Trail. Only trails provide access to the Big Basin headquarters.
