= Waddell Creek (California) =

Waddell Creek Cañada de la La Salud
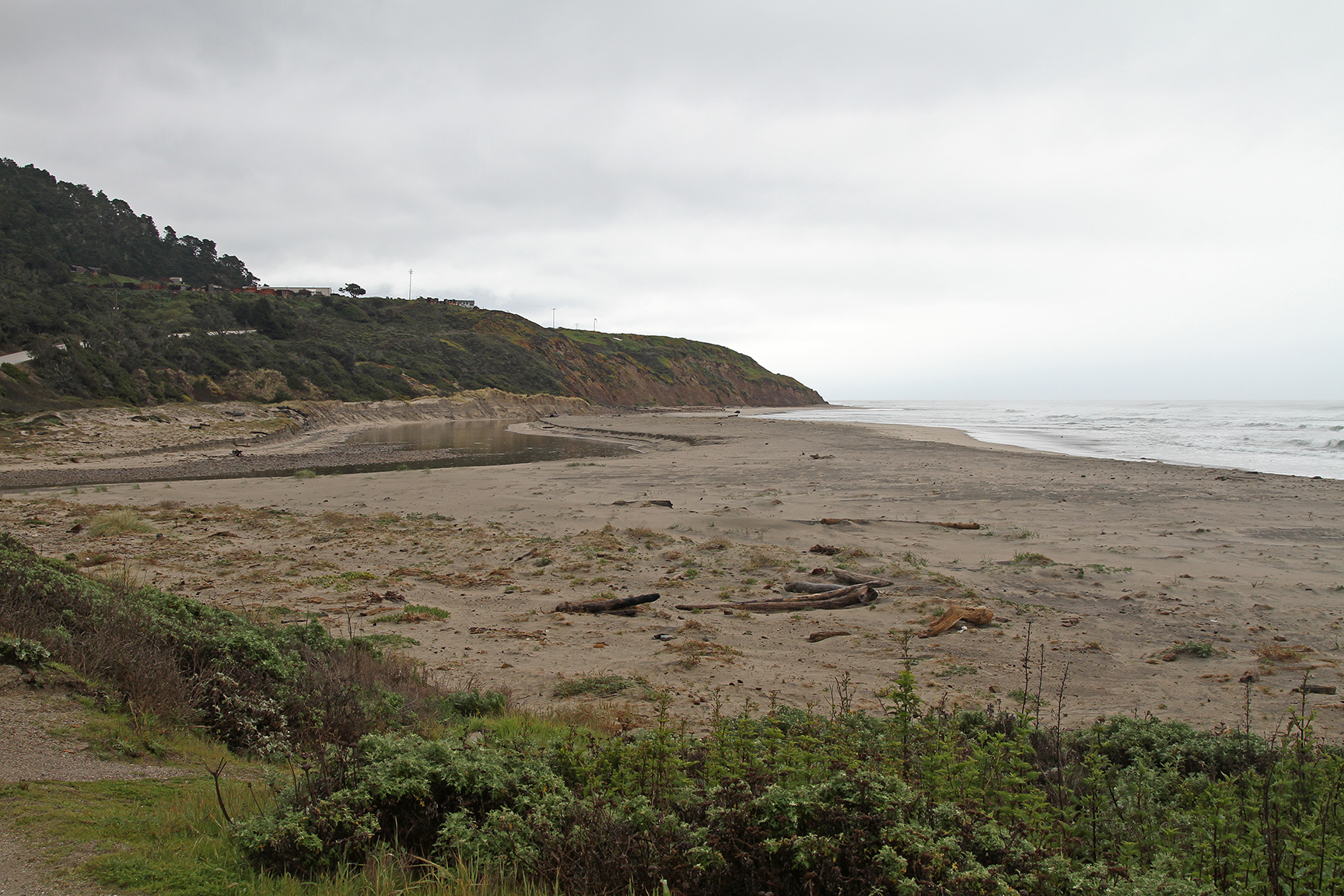
- The mouth of Waddell Creek at Waddell Beach, in the Rancho Del Oso section of the Big Basin Redwoods State Park

Location
- Country: United States
- State: California
- Region: Santa Cruz County

Physical characteristics
- Source: Confluence of East and West Waddell Creeks in the
  - location: Big Basin Redwoods State Park
  - coordinates: 37°08′02″N 122°16′03″W
  - elevation: 82 ft (25 m)
- Mouth: Pacific Ocean
  - coordinates: 37°05′33″N 122°16′36″W
  - elevation: 0 ft (0 m)

Basin features
- Tributaries
  - left: East Waddell Creek
  - right: West Waddell Creek

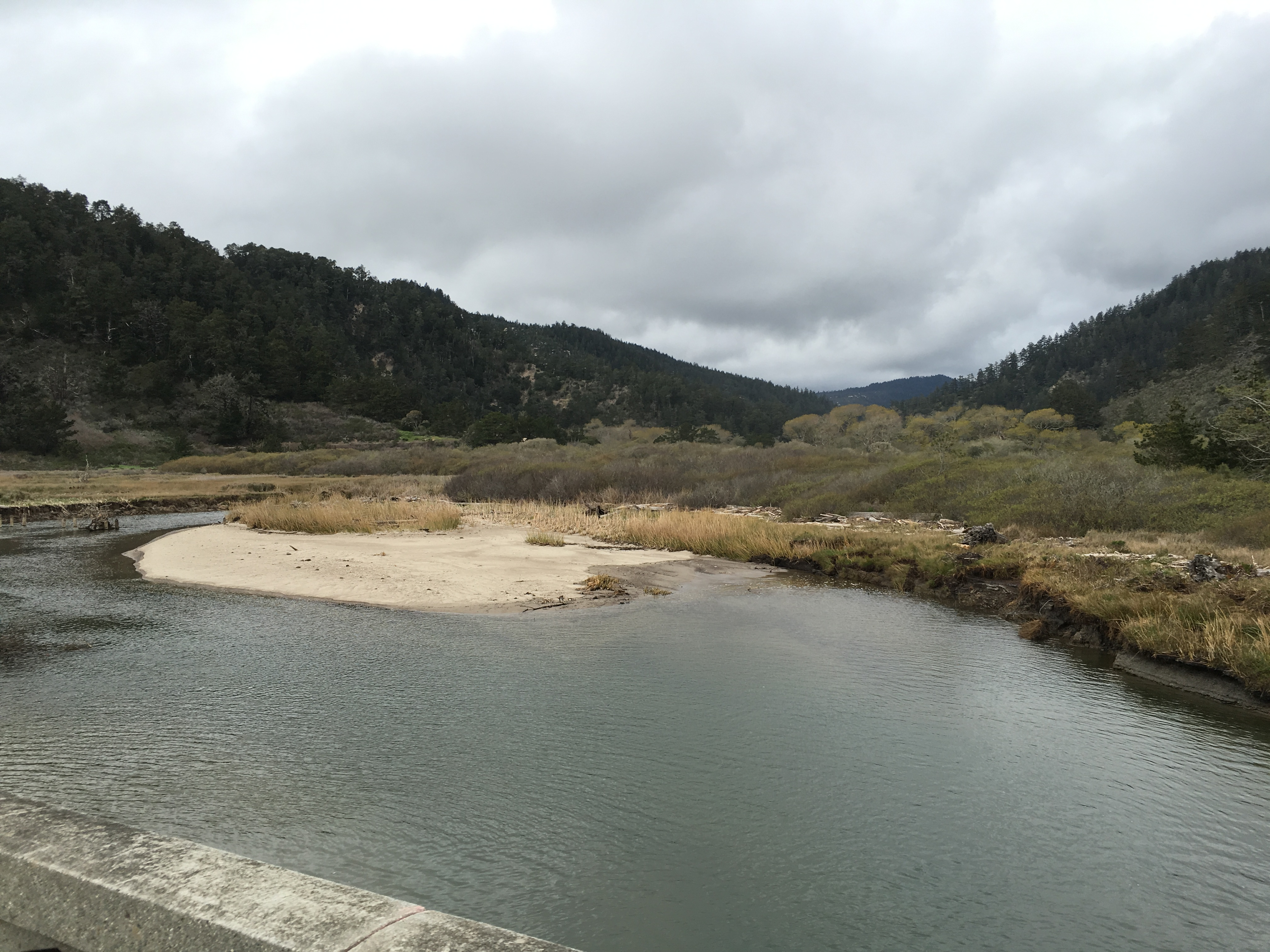
Looking north from Coast Highway 1 bridge at Waddell Creek estuary

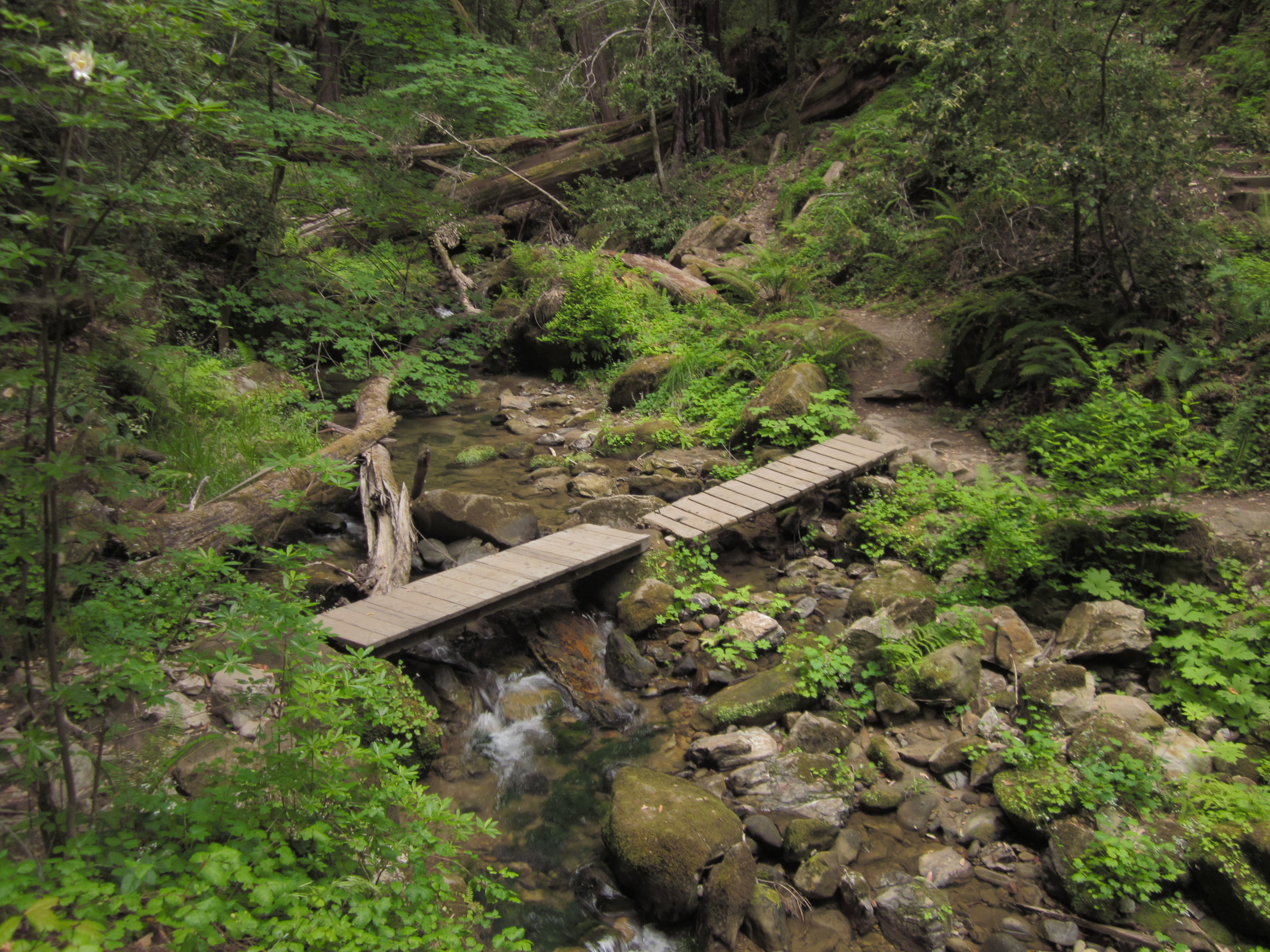
The Skyline-to-the-Sea Trail passing over West Waddell Creek

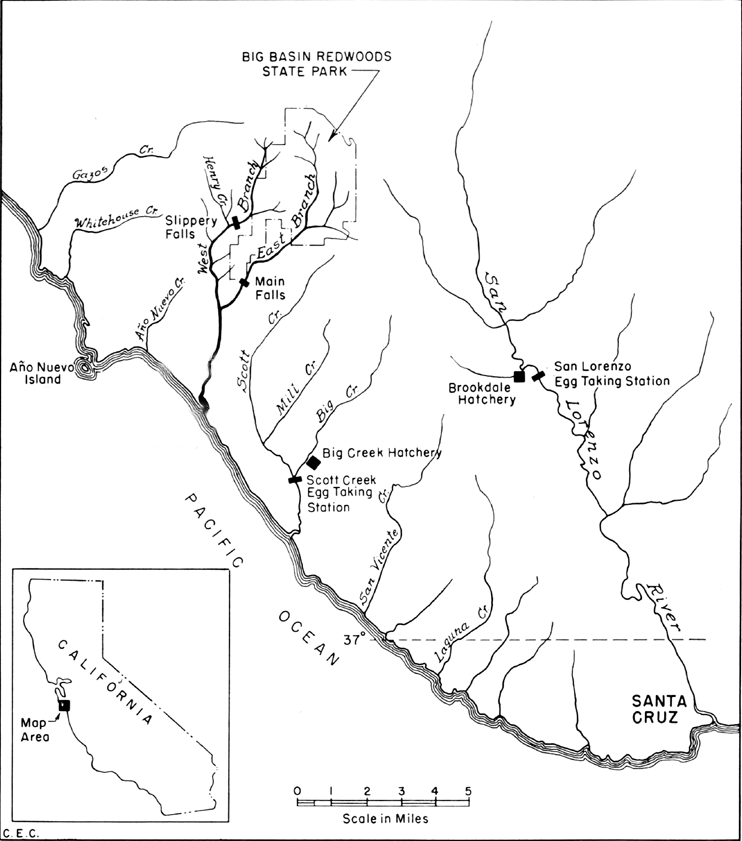
1954 Map of Waddell Creek, Scott Creek and San Lorenzo River

Waddell Creek is the name given to both the creek and the watershed that run through Big Basin Redwoods State Park in Santa Cruz County, California. The Waddell Creek mainstem is formed by the confluence of East and West Waddell Creeks, and empties into the Pacific Ocean at Waddell Beach, just south of Año Nuevo Point.

== History ==
The first European land exploration of Alta California, the Spanish Portolà expedition, passed through the area on its way north, camping for three days at Waddell Creek, October 20–22, 1769, and initially named the creek Cañada de San Luis Beltran. The longer stay was because of heavy rains, and fears that the weather would worsen the condition of those in the party who were sick. Instead, as Franciscan missionary Juan Crespi noted in his diary, "it seemed as though God had sent them health with the drenching, for to the surprise of everybody they began to improve, and in a short time were entirely recovered, thanks to God, to whom we attributed this special blessing. For this reason the valley was renamed Cañada de la La Salud."

William Waddell of Kentucky came to California in 1851. The first American settler of the area (for whom the creek and valley are named), he built a sawmill on the creek in 1862 above the Waddell Forks and conducted an extensive timber harvesting operation in the area, a lumber-hauling tramway from the mill to the beach, and a wharf. Waddell was killed by a California grizzly bear in 1875.

== Watershed and course ==
The Waddell Creek mainstem is 2.75 miles (4.43 km) long, although total distance from headwater source tributaries to the sea is 14 miles (23 km). The Waddell Creek watershed drains 26 square miles (67 km^{2}) and consists of many headwater creeks that feed its two tributaries, East and West Waddell Creeks. West Waddell Creek has its source at 1,800 feet (550 m) along the border of Santa Cruz and San Mateo Counties, while East Waddell Creek's source is at the confluence of Opal Creek and Blooms Creek at 915 feet (279 m) just below Big Basin Redwoods State Park headquarters in Santa Cruz County. Some of the uppermost headwaters streams originate above 2,000 feet (610 m).

== Ecology ==
Historically, Waddell Creek was home to spawning runs by both steelhead trout (Oncorhynchus mykiss) and coho salmon (Oncorhynchus kisutch). In 1995, a review of coho south of San Francisco Bay found coho restricted to only one remnant population in Waddell Creek, one small naturalized (hatchery-influenced) population in Scott Creek and a small hatchery-maintained, non-native run in the San Lorenzo River, all in Santa Cruz County. Historically, coho were found in approximately 50 coastal drainages in San Mateo and Santa Cruz counties, but by the 1960s, spawning runs were limited to 11 stream systems. The 1995 combined average annual spawning population of native and naturalized coho salmon in Waddell and Scott Creeks was estimated at only 50–60 adults, comprising only 1.5% of the estimated abundance of coho salmon south of San Francisco Bay in the early 1960s. Coho vanished from Waddell Creek, but there is hope of returns from the Kingfisher Flat Hatchery on the Big Creek tributary to nearby Scott Creek where the salmon returned in 2015 due to stocking efforts.

Usable salmonid spawning and rearing habitat is limited by the 2.65 miles (4.26 km) distance from Waddell Forks (elevation 82 feet (25 m)) to Slippery Falls (elevation 185 feet (56 m) on West Waddell Creek and the 1.0 mile (1.6 km) from Waddell Forks to the Main Falls on East Waddell Creek (elevation 210 feet (64 m).

The upper stream banks are in the coast redwood (Sequoia sempervirens) belt of the Santa Cruz Mountains, while the lower stream banks are lined by red alder (Alnus rubra), big-leaf maple (Acer macrophyllum), California buckeye (Aesculus californica), Pacific madrone (Arbutus menziesii), California laurel (Umbellularia californica), and, in the lowermost portion, by willows (Salix spp.). Occasionally encountered are tanoak (Lithocarpus densiflora), box elder (Acer negundo subsp. californicum), white alder (Alnus rhombifolia), black cottonwood (Populus trichocarpa), California nutmeg (Torreya californica), and coast Douglas fir (Pseudotsuga menziesii var. menziesii).

== See also ==
- List of rivers of California
