= Big Basin Redwoods State Park =

State park in Santa Cruz County, California, United States

- IUCN category V (protected landscape/seascape)
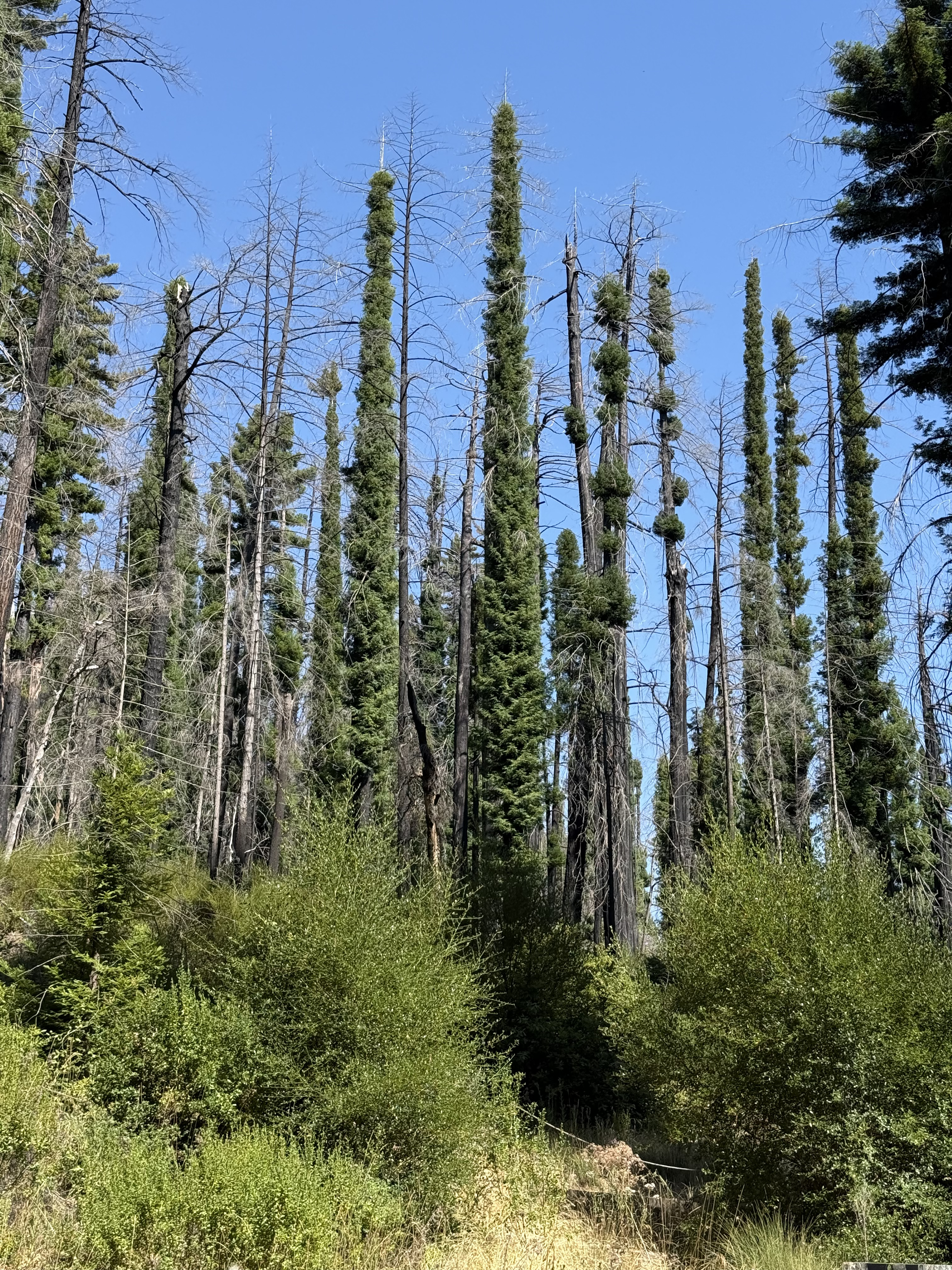
- 2025 view of the forest following the 2020 CZU Lightning Complex fires burned over 97% of the park
- Interactive map of Big Basin Redwoods State Park
- Location: Santa Cruz County, California, United States
- Nearest city: Santa Cruz, California
- Coordinates: 37°10′21″N 122°13′21″W
- Area: 18,000 acres (73 km^{2})
- Established: 1902
- Governing body: California Department of Parks and Recreation
- Website: parks.ca.gov/bigbasin

California Historical Landmark
- Reference no.: 827

Big Basin Redwoods State Park is a state park in the U.S. state of California, located in Santa Cruz County, about 36 km (22 mi) northwest of Santa Cruz. The park contains almost all of the Waddell Creek watershed, which was formed by the seismic uplift of its rim, and the erosion of its center by the many streams in its bowl-shaped depression. Part of the natural area is old-growth forest and recognized by the Old-Growth Forest Network.

Big Basin is California's oldest state park, established in 1902, earning its designation as a California Historical Landmark. Its original 3,800 acres (15 km^{2}) have been increased over the years to over 18,000 acres (73 km^{2}). It is part of the Northern California coastal forests ecoregion and is home to the largest continuous stand of ancient coast redwoods south of San Francisco. It contains 10,800 acres (44 km^{2}) of old-growth forest as well as recovering redwood forest, with mixed conifer, oaks, chaparral and riparian habitats. Elevations in the park vary from sea level to over 600 m (2,000 ft). The climate ranges from foggy and damp near the ocean to sunny, warm ridge tops.

The park has over 130 km (81 mi) of trails. Some of these trails link Big Basin to Castle Rock State Park and the eastern reaches of the Santa Cruz range. The Skyline-to-the-Sea Trail threads its way through the park along Waddell Creek to Waddell Beach, and the adjacent Theodore J. Hoover Natural Preserve, a freshwater marsh.

The park has many waterfalls, a wide variety of environments (from lush canyon bottoms to sparse chaparral-covered slopes), many species of mammals (deer, raccoons, an occasional bobcat) and abundant bird life – including Steller's jays, egrets, herons and acorn woodpeckers.

The CZU Lightning Complex fires in August 2020 burned over 97% of Big Basin and destroyed the park headquarters, closing the park for 2 years during rebuilding efforts before it reopened in Summer 2022.

== History ==
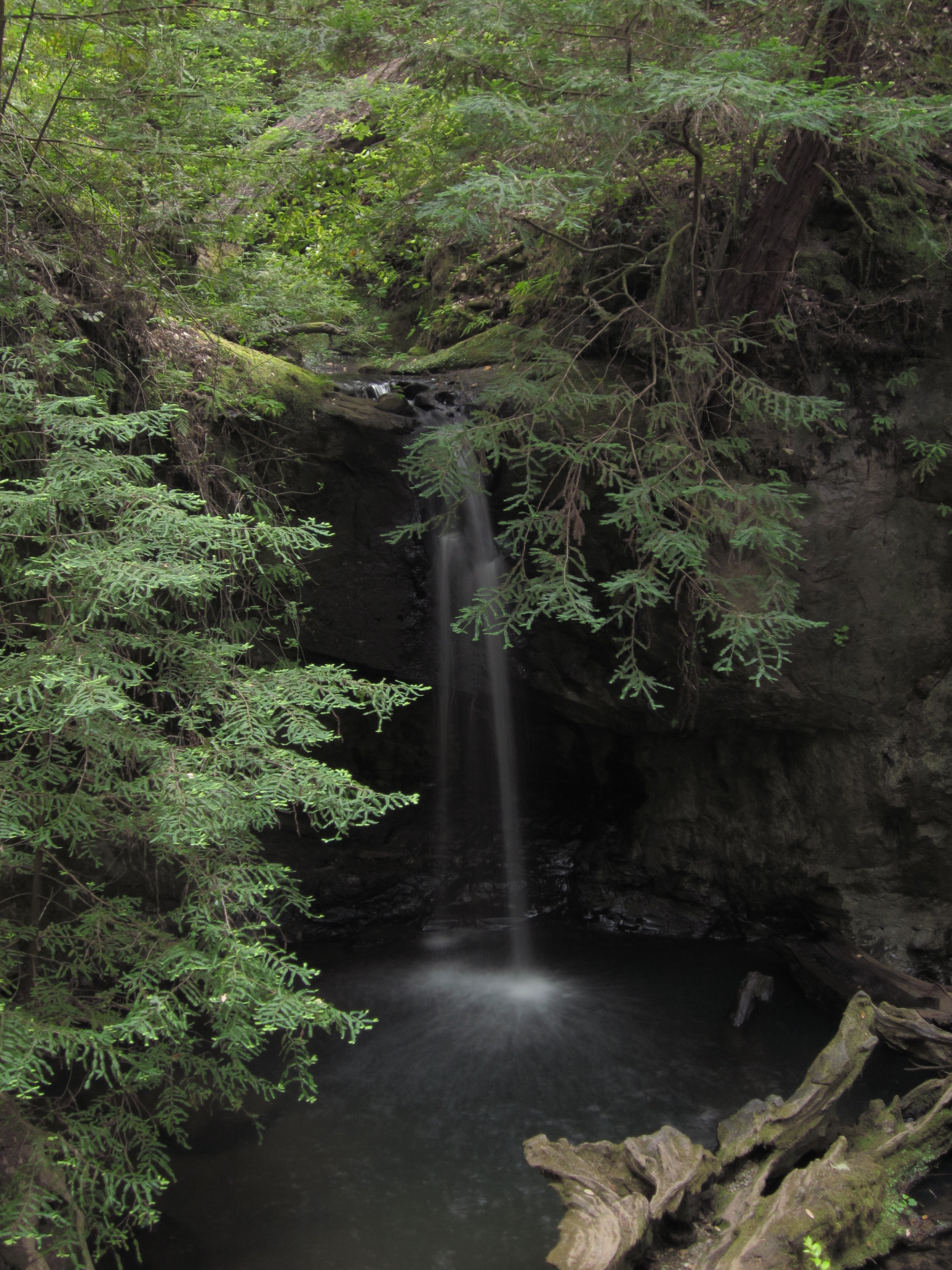
Sempervirens Falls in 2011

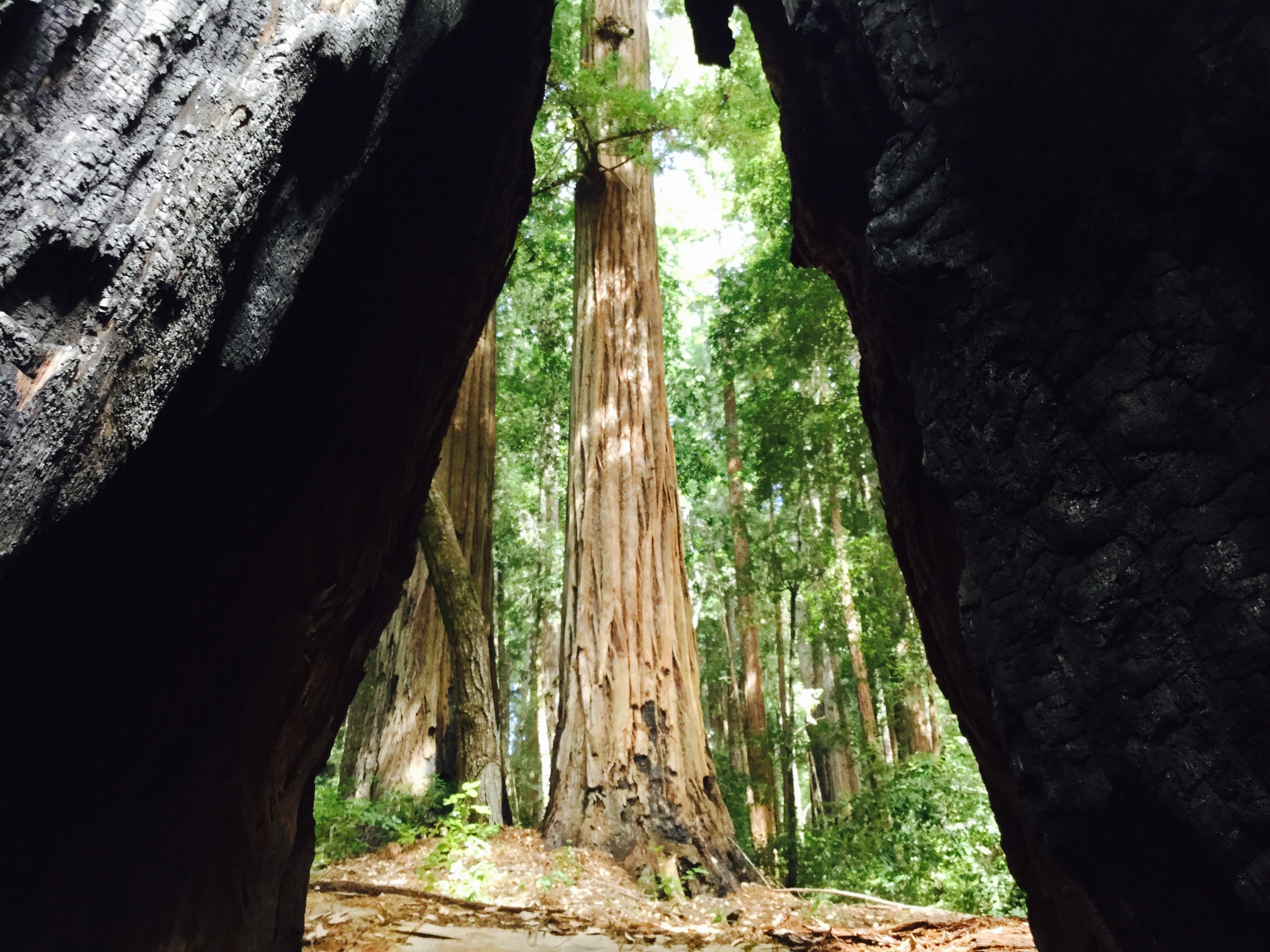
A Redwood in Big Basin photographed 13 August 2020, three days before the fire.

Archaeological evidence has sporadically found prehistoric people inhabited old growth forests within the Park. Numerous resources would have been available to California Indians in the old growth forests, such as basketry material, plant foods like acorns and bulbs as well as animal prey for hunters and perhaps traditional sacred places. Ohlone tribes that lived on watercourses which begin in the park were the Quiroste, Achistaca, Cotoni and Sayante. In October 1769, the Portola expedition encountered the redwoods of southern Santa Cruz County, and camped at the mouth of Waddell Creek, in present-day Big Basin, later that month. Although many in the party had been ill with scurvy, they gorged themselves on berries and quickly recovered. This miraculous recovery, as it seemed at the time, inspired the name given to the valley: 'Cañada de la Salud' or Canyon of Health.

By the late 19th century, redwood forests were gaining international appreciation while also being decimated. Early conservationists, including notable Santa Cruzans William T. Jeter and Arthur A. Taylor (A. A. Taylor) were joined by Santa Clara County activists Andrew P. Hill, Father Robert Kenna and Carrie Stevens Walter. Their movement to preserve the Big Basin redwood forest began at Stanford University on May 1, Soon after Santa Cruzans led an excursion to the park where seven men and two women formed the Sempervirens Club. The Sempervirens galvanized the state-wide effort resulting in ground-breaking legislation being signed into law in March 1901. The official land transfer occurred in 1902: The California Redwood Park initially consisted of 3,800 acres (15 km^{2}), most of it old growth forest.

In the following decades, visitation to Big Basin grew steadily as park amenities were developed. The Big Basin Inn offered cabins to rent, a restaurant, general store, barber shop, gas station and photographic studio. There were also a post office, a concrete swimming pool, boating areas, tennis courts and a dance floor. Campsites cost 50 cents a night in 1927 and many families stayed all summer. During the Great Depression of the 1930s, the Civilian Conservation Corps assigned a company to Big Basin. These men built the amphitheater, miles of trails, and many of the buildings still used today. The main administration building, built by the CCC in 1936, was listed on the National Register of Historic Places prior to its destruction in the 2020 fires.

Save the Redwoods League purchased a 564-acre (228 ha) parcel known as Cascade Creek in 2020 that links Big Basin with Año Nuevo State Park.

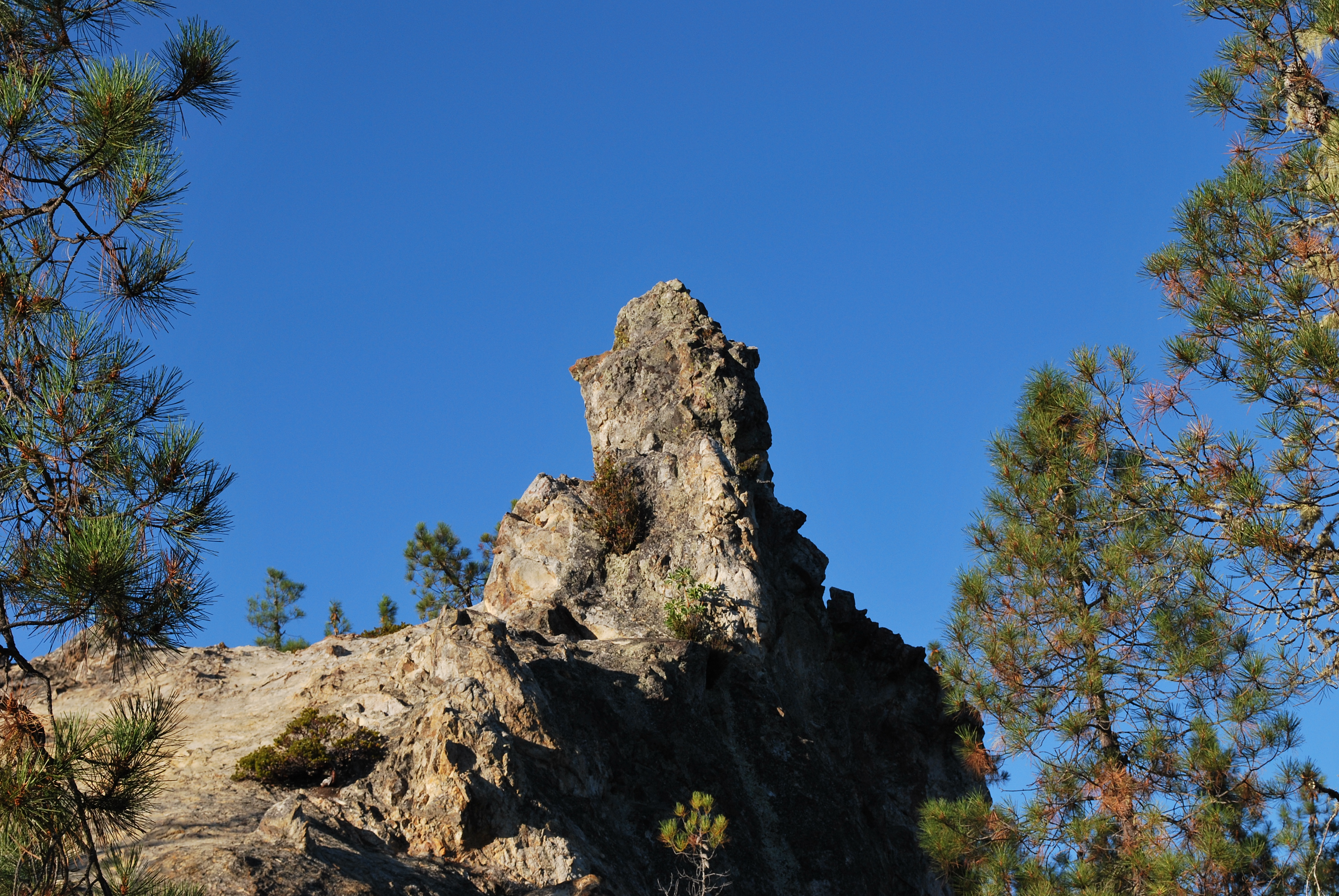
Buzzard's Roost in 2008

=== 2020 CZU Lightning Complex Wildfire ===
The CZU Lightning Complex fires started on August 16, 2020 and burned 86,509 acres across Santa Cruz and San Mateo counties. The fire spread quickly, and the area was evacuated on August 18. On August 20, it was reported that the park's historic headquarters building had been completely destroyed, and the campgrounds around the park were extensively damaged. After actively burning for 37 days, the fires were contained on September 22. Over 97% of Big Basin was burned and nearly every structure was destroyed.

This was the first major wildfire in Big Basin in over 100 years, which had previously burned in 1904. This led to a greater intensity of the CZU fires, causing severe damage to the majority of the old growth trees. While some of the trees fell during and after the fires, the majority of the ancient redwoods remain standing. However, studies have shown that only 24% of the forest in Big Basin is still alive and regrowing due to the intensity of the fires and drought in the following years, and the old growth forest may never fully recover.

An April 2021 backcountry tour revealed the scorched landscape and the hundred structures destroyed, and the park superintendent estimated it might be up to a year before the public will be allowed safe access to park trails. The burnt wreckage of 1,490 structures and 15,000 charred trees, mainly Douglas fir, had fallen or were in danger of falling onto the hiking trails. One year after the fire, the clean up and rebuilding process began. The park remained closed to the public until July 22, 2022. Almost two years after the fire, Big Basin partially reopened 8 hiking trails for day use.

== Flora ==
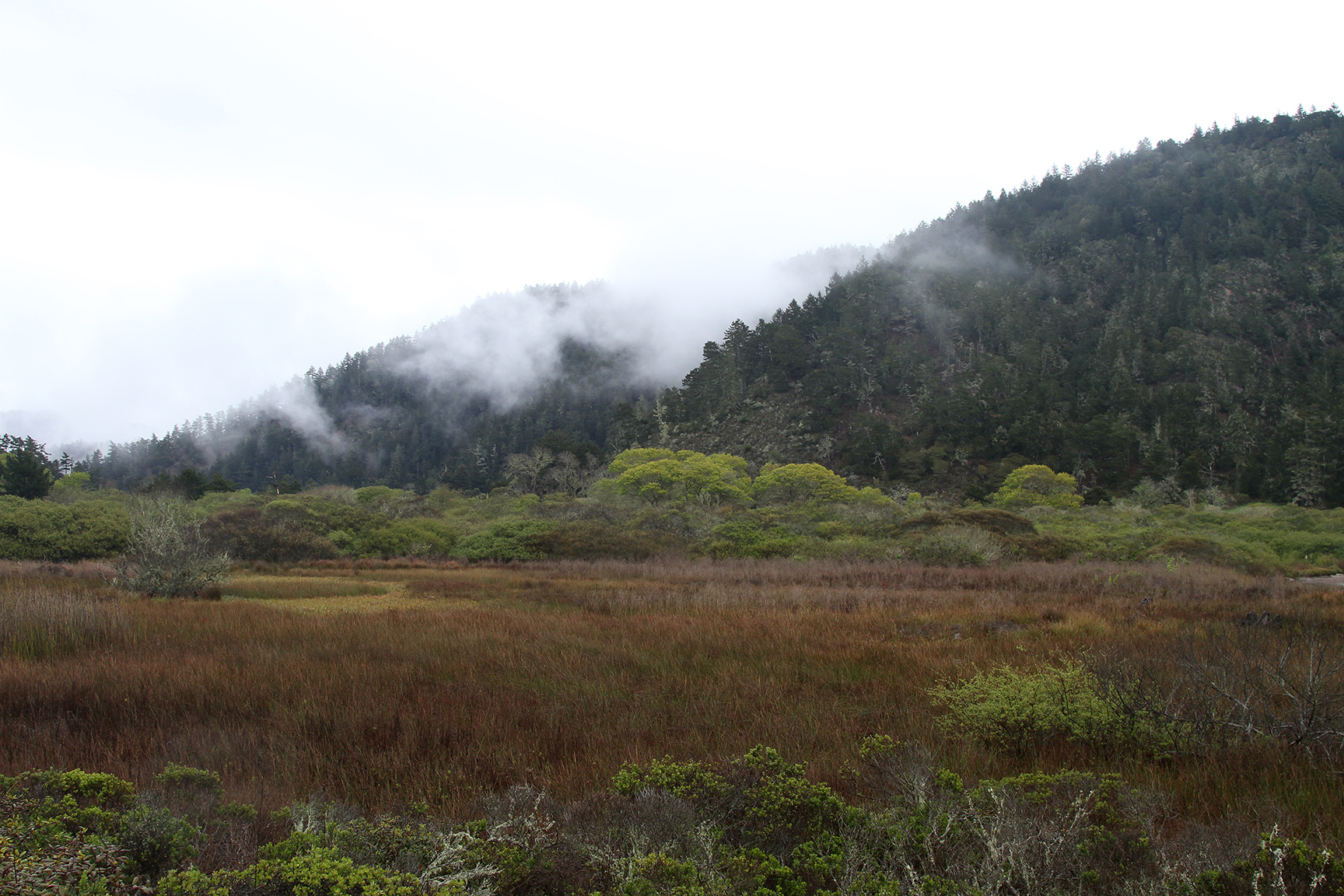
2012 view of the Rancho Del Oso section of the Park, including Waddell Marsh in the Theodore J. Hoover Natural Preserve, from the Skyline-to-the-Sea Trail

Although redwoods dominate the landscape, many other plant species are common in Big Basin. Coast Douglas-fir, tan oak, Pacific madrone, and Pacific wax myrtle trees can be seen in the park. Competing for sunshine are also many shrubs such as red huckleberries, western azalea, and many varieties of ferns. In the spring and summer wildflowers may be seen: redwood sorrel, salal, redwood violets, trillium, star lily and mountain iris. In the fall and winter deliver hundreds of kinds of fungi can be found.

Upon climbing to higher elevations, one will find the forest growing thinner, as redwoods are replaced by more drought-tolerant species. The higher, drier ridges and slopes of Big Basin are typically full of chaparral vegetation: knobcone pines, chinquapin and buckeye create the canopy, with ceanothus, manzanita, chamise, and chaparral pea growing dense and low. Adding a splash of color are wildflowers such as Indian paintbrush, monkey flower, bush poppies and yerba santa.

Near the mouth of Waddell Creek is the Theodore J. Hoover Natural Preserve, a rare relatively undisturbed freshwater marsh. This special place provides habitat for a wide variety of birds, reptiles and amphibians. The nearby Rancho Del Oso Nature and History Center interprets the cultural and natural history of the area.

== Fauna ==
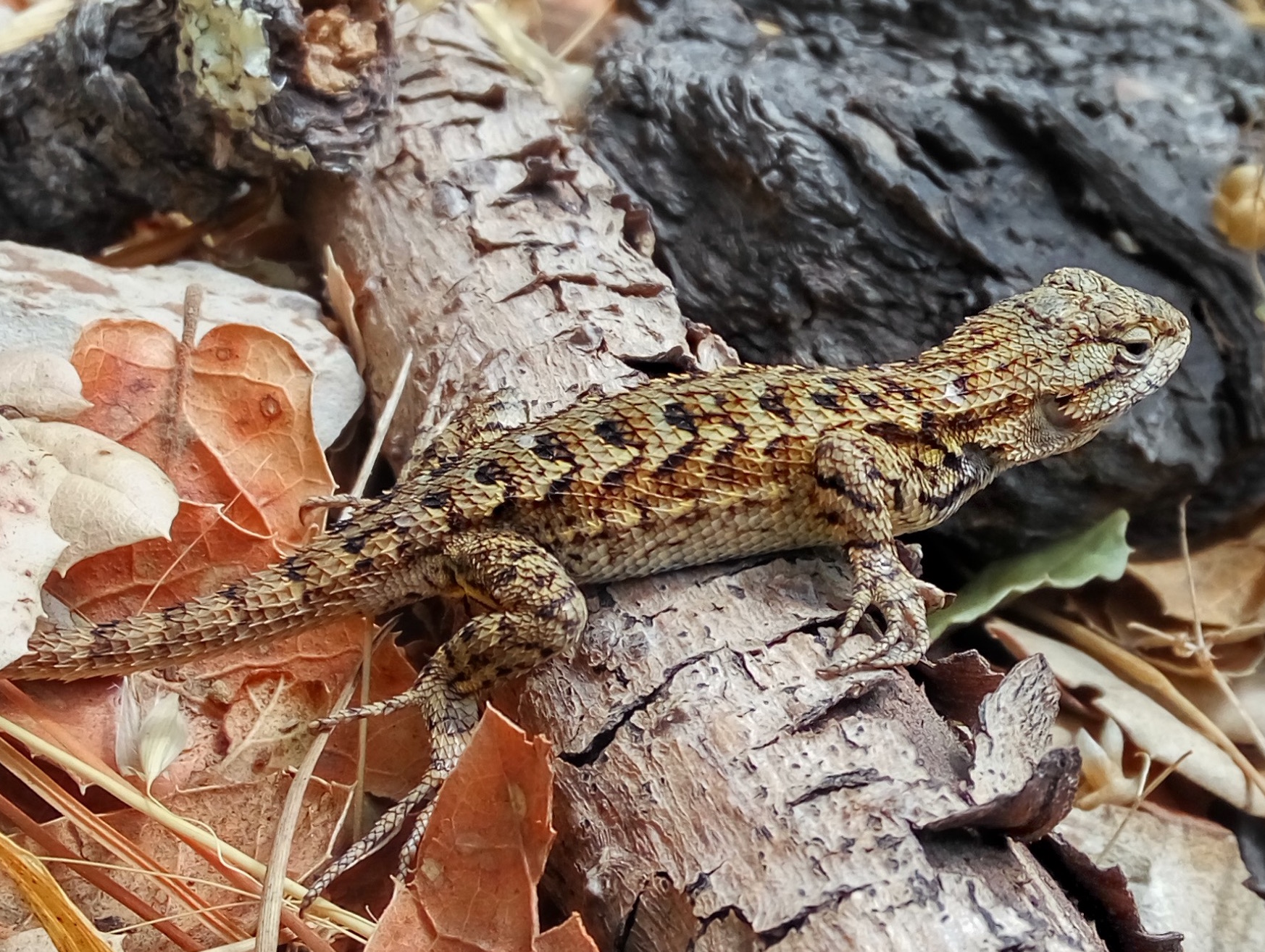
A western fence lizard in 2016; it was fairly commonly spotted in Big Basin before the 2020 fires.

Mammals such as black-tailed deer, western gray squirrels, chipmunks and raccoons are common, but foxes, coyotes, bobcats, and opossums are also present. Cougars are known to live in the park but are rarely sighted. Grizzly bears are extinct in California, but were numerous in the past. The last known human to die in California due to a grizzly attack in the wild occurred in Big Basin when, in 1875, William Waddell, a lumber mill owner, was killed near Waddell Creek.

Bird life is abundant throughout the park. Steller's jays and acorn woodpeckers are both seen and heard, and the dark-eyed junco is widespread. Less obvious are the brown creeper, Anna's hummingbird, northern flicker, olive-sided flycatcher and sharp-shinned hawk. The first marbled murrelet nest ever sighted was located in Big Basin not far from the park headquarters. These robin-sized seabirds nest high in the oldest coast Douglas-firs and redwoods to feed their young. They can be seen or heard at dawn and dusk, high above the forest canopy.

Many reptiles are also present, but aside from the ubiquitous Coast Range subspecies of the western fence lizard (Sceloporus occidentalis bocourtii), most are rarely seen due to their shy behavior. The only dangerous reptile in the park is the Pacific rattlesnake (Crotalus oreganus), found almost exclusively in the high, dry chaparral.

The damp, shady woodland floor is home to a variety of amphibians. Commonly seen species include the California newt (Taricha torosa torosa), Pacific tree frog (Pseudacris regilla), and arboreal salamander (Aneides lugubris). Less commonly seen are the black salamander (Aneides flavipunctatus) and California giant salamander (Dicamptodon ensatus) and the threatened California red-legged frog (Rana draytonii). Particularly intriguing are banana slugs (Ariolimax spp.), which can reach 6 inches long.

The butterfly, California sisters (Adelpha bredowii), flutter high in the tree canopies.

== Camping ==
Big Basin Redwoods State Park previously had many options for camping, including cabins, developed campsites, and trail camps. Within the park, there were 146 individual campsites, 36 cabins, and five trail camps. The 2020 CZU Lightning Complex fires destroyed many campgrounds; as of Summer 2024, none have re-opened.

Each campground at Big Basin Redwoods State Park was open on a different schedule during the year. The Huckleberry and Sequoia Campgrounds were open year round while Blooms Creek, Sempervirens, Watashi and Sky Meadow Campgrounds were seasonal.

== Access ==
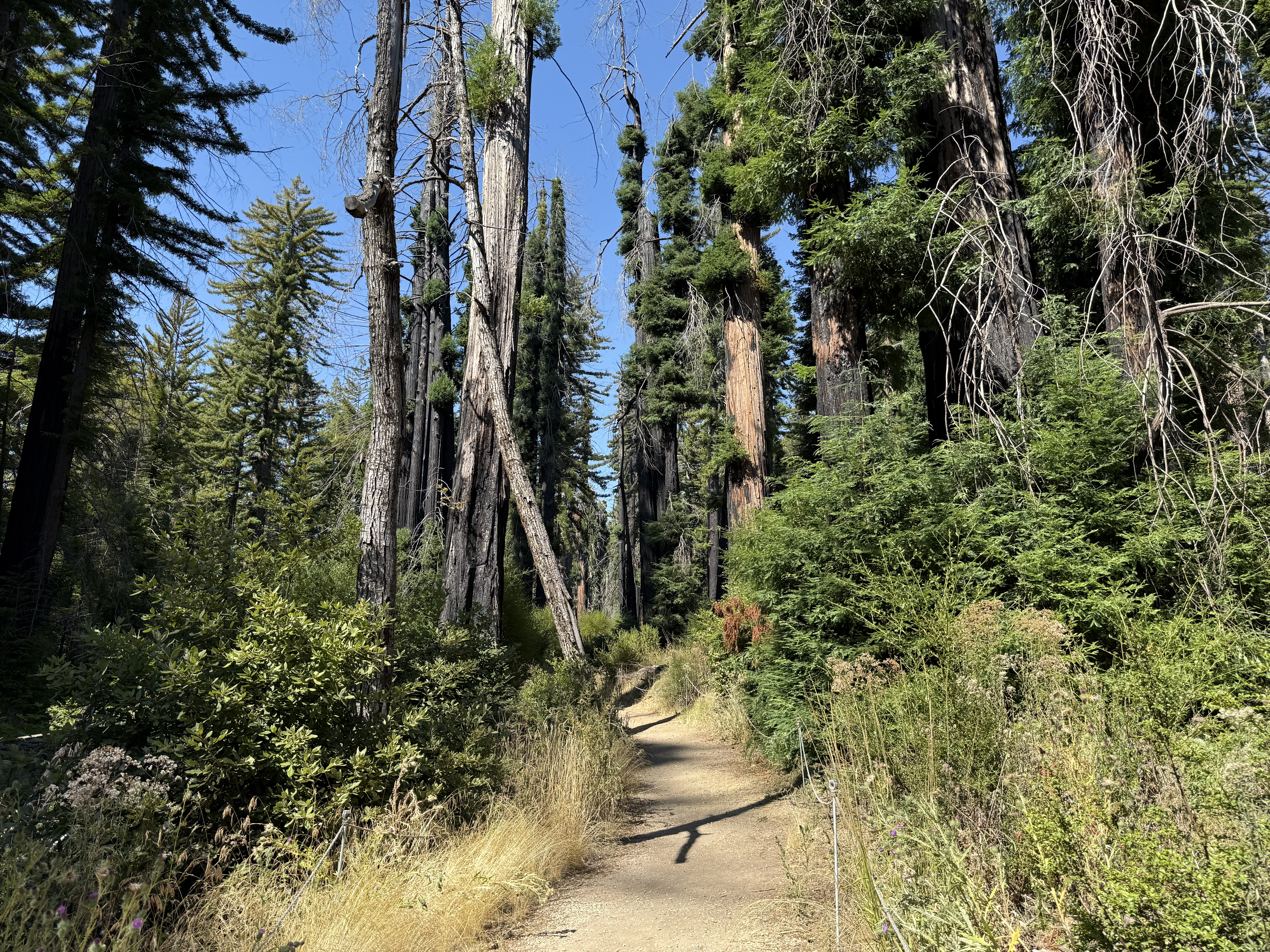
Meandering walkways take visitors through recovering redwood groves in 2025

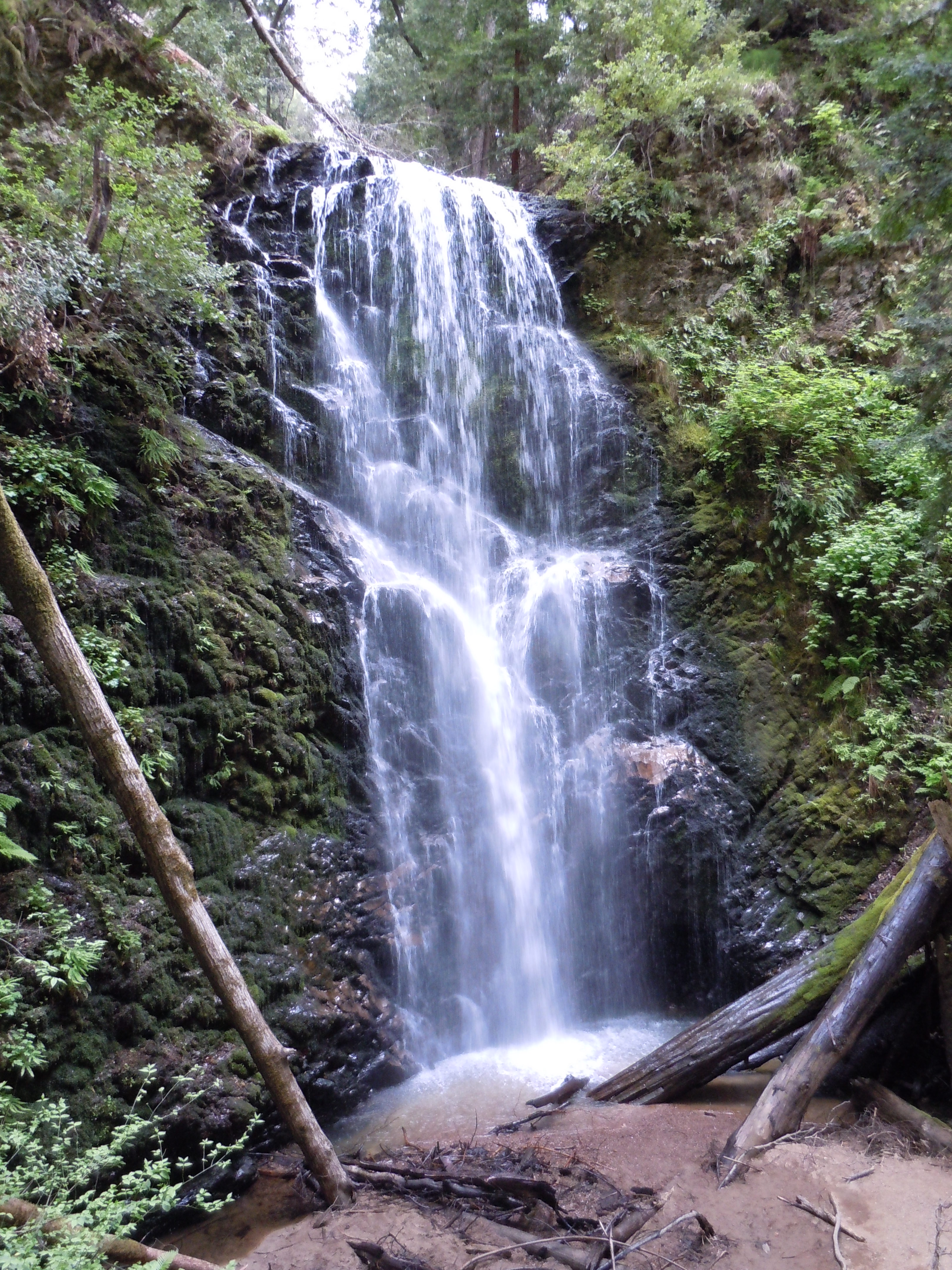
Berry Creek Falls in 2011

The park is about two hours south of San Francisco, or seven hours north of Los Angeles.

Big Basin can be approached from the east, through redwood forest and coastal mountains, or from the coast, along State Route 1. The eastern route, over State Route 9 through Saratoga and smaller towns like Boulder Creek is more popular because of the famous trees. This route passes Castle Rock State Park (California) on the eastern side of the Santa Cruz range.

From SR 1, Gazos Creek road offers a fire-road route for mountain bikes (road closed to motor vehicles), which can then descend into the headquarters area or turn off on Johansen fire road to join China Grade above its intersection with State Route 236.

After reopening the park after the CZU Lightning Complex fires, the Santa Cruz Metropolitan Transit District expanded its bus route 35 service to run four trips to and from the park on weekends only.

== In popular culture ==
The park stands in for the fictional "Bolderoc National Park" in George Marshall's The Forest Rangers, Muir Woods in Alfred Hitchcock's Vertigo, and Redwood National Park in the Disney film The Gnome-Mobile.

== See also ==
- List of California state parks

== Gallery ==
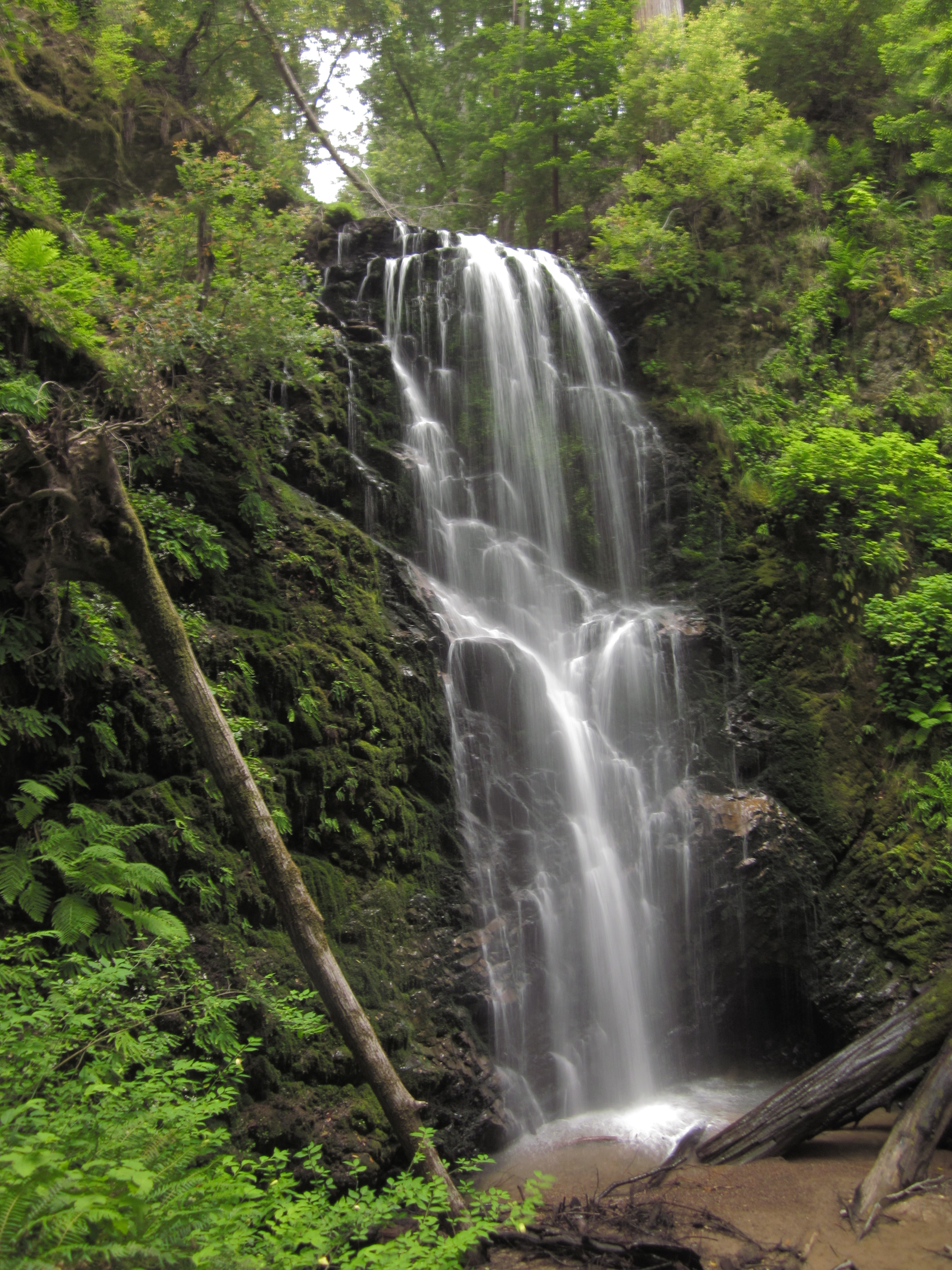
Berry Creek Falls in 2011

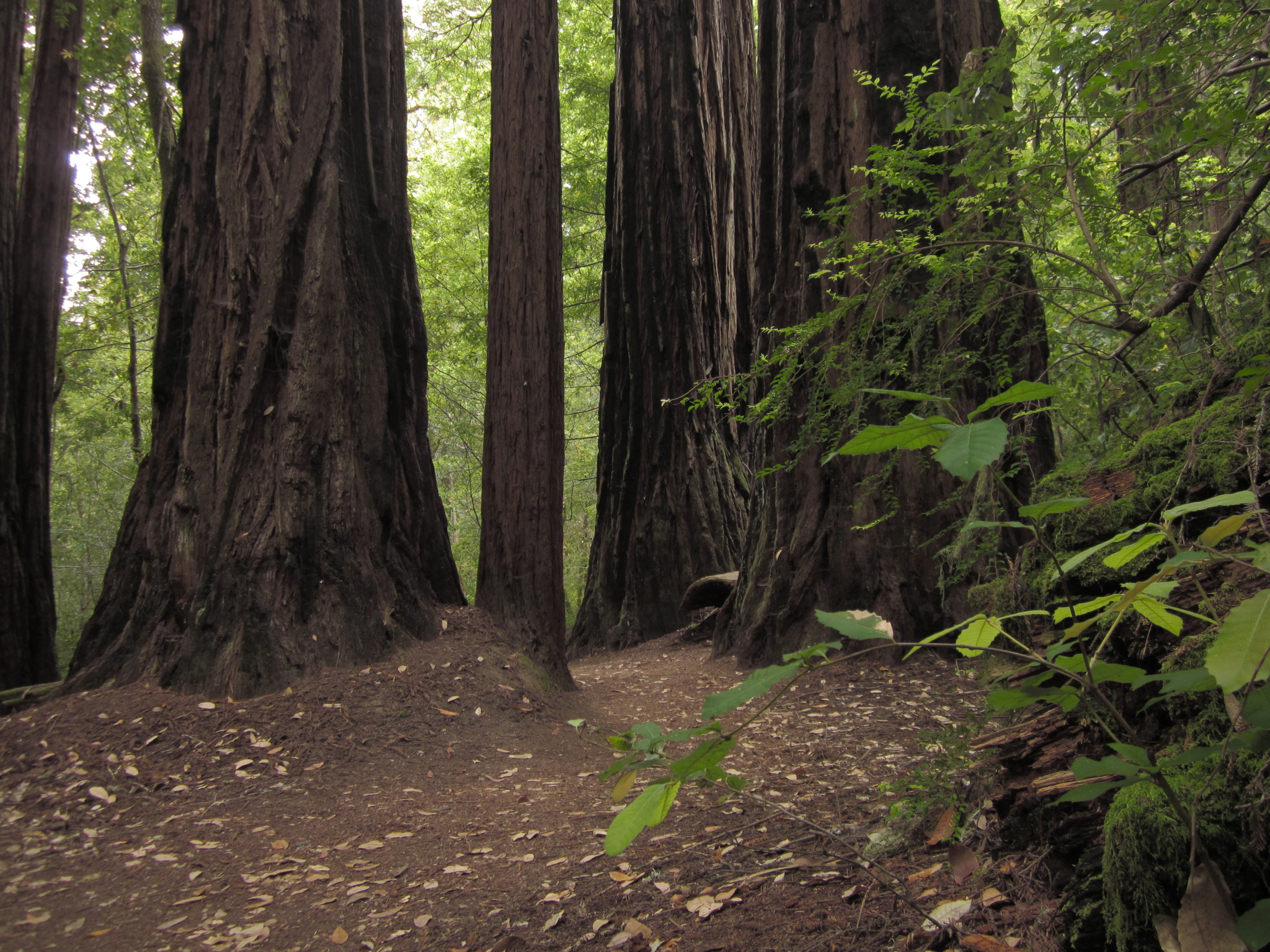
The Skyline-to-the-Sea Trail passing through a stand of California redwood trees in 2011.

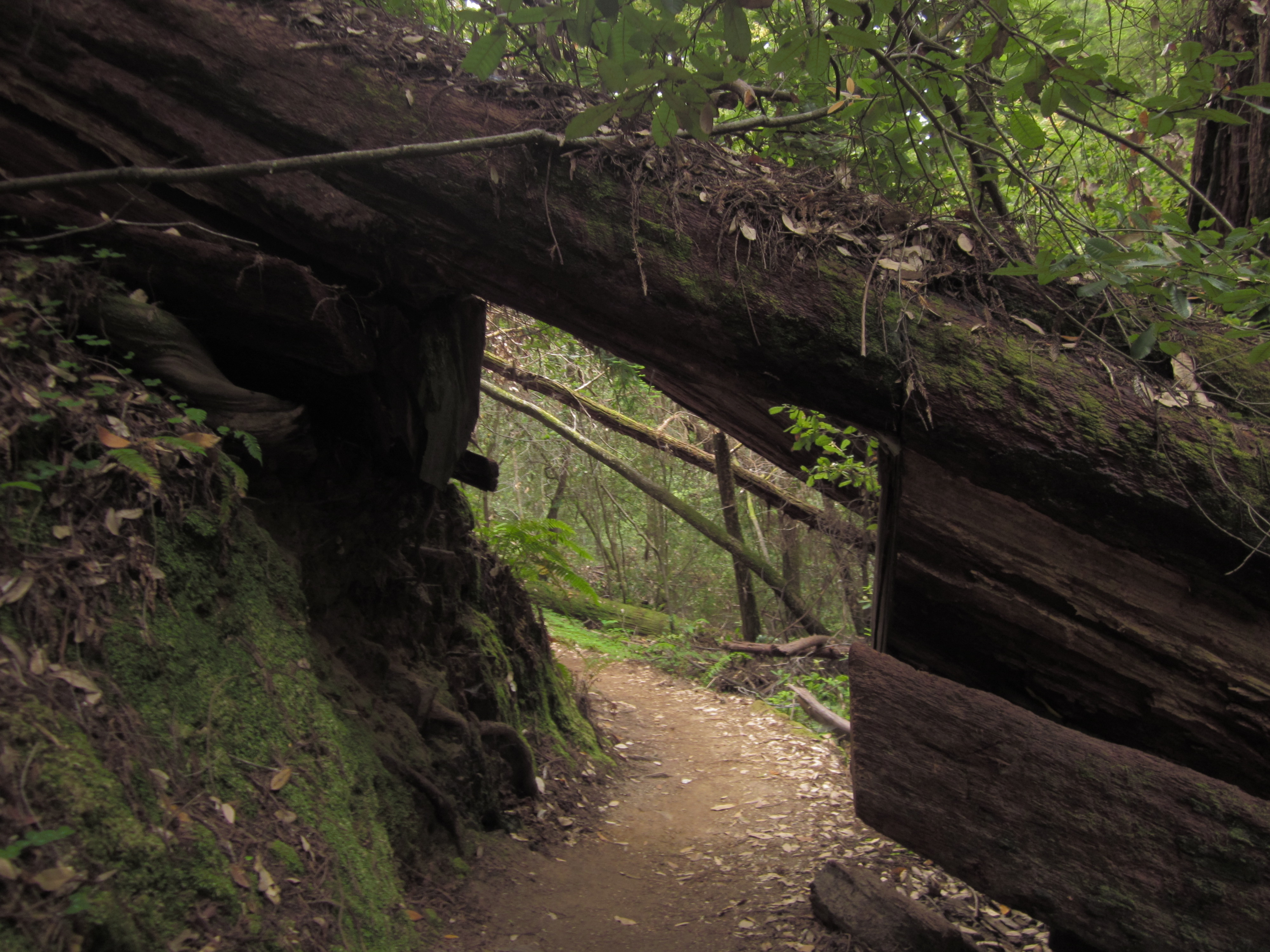
The Skyline-to-the-Sea Trail passing through a fallen California redwood tree in 2011.

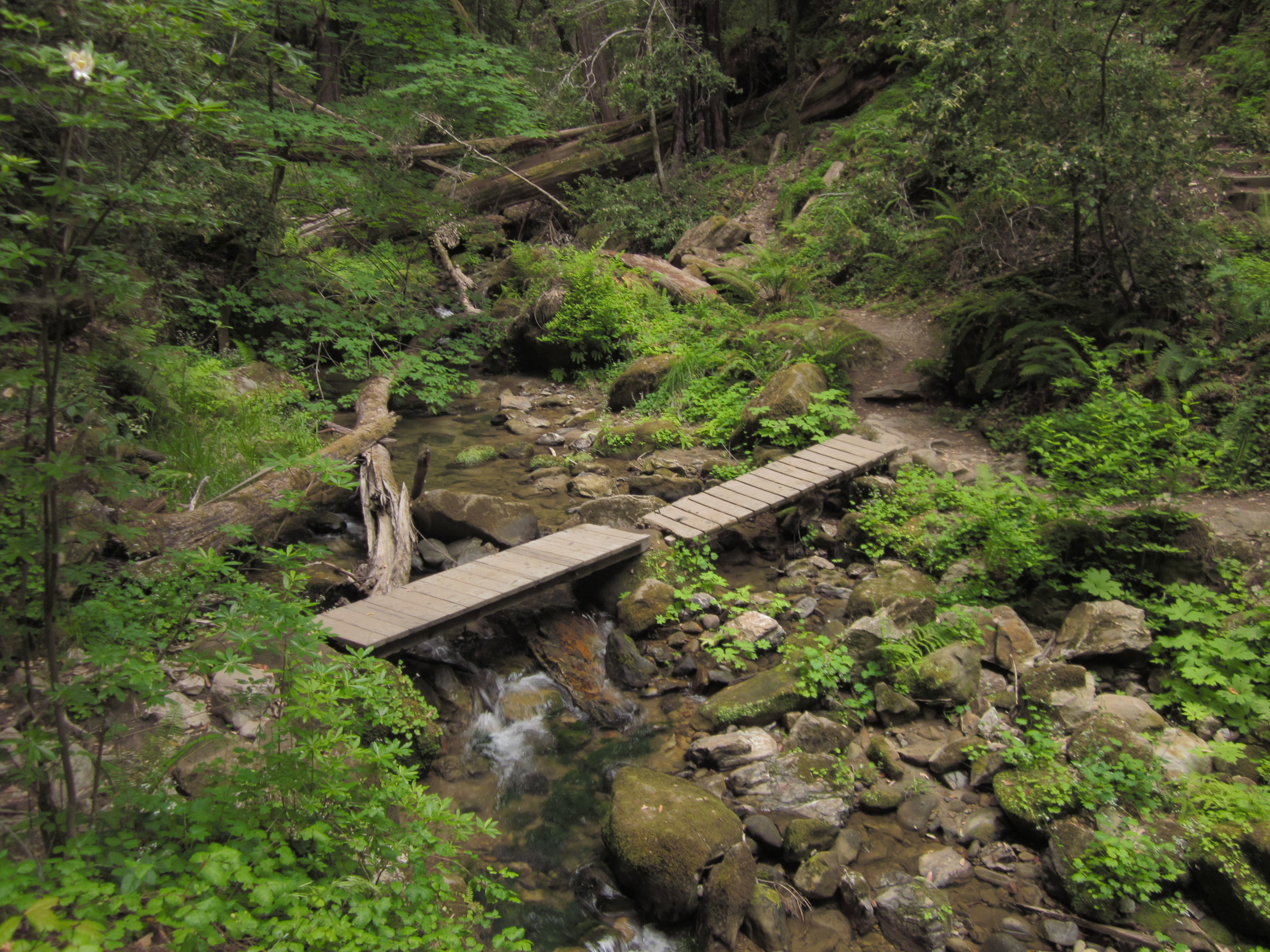
The Skyline-to-the-Sea Trail passing over Waddell Creek in 2011.

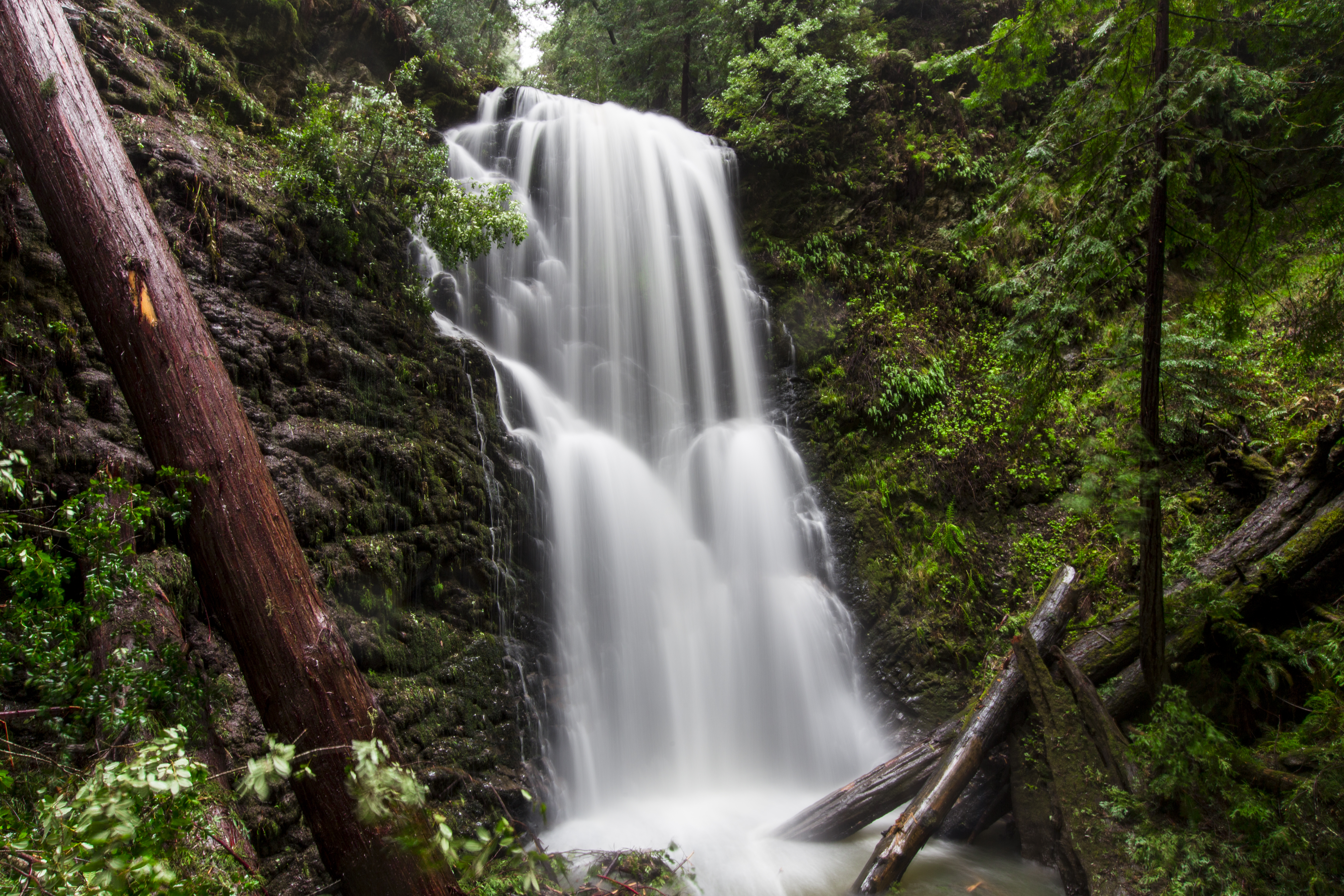
Berry Creek Falls in 2016
