= Carrier Pigeon (ship) =

American clipper ship

History

United States
- Name: Carrier Pigeon
- Namesake: Carrier pigeon
- Owner: Reed, Wade & Co., Boston
- Builder: Hall, Snow & Company, Bath, Maine
- Launched: 18 October 1852
- Fate: Sunk on maiden voyage, 1853
- Notes: Wreck sold, with cargo, for US$1,500 (equivalent to $56,700 in 2024)

General characteristics
- Class & type: Medium clipper
- Tons burthen: 843
- Length: 175 ft 5 in (53.47 m)
- Beam: 34 ft 5 in (10.49 m)
- Draft: 21 ft 0 in (6.40 m)

Carrier Pigeon was an American clipper ship that was launched in the fall of 1852 from Bath, Maine. Her value was estimated at US$54,000 (equivalent to $2,041,000 in 2024). She was wrecked on her maiden voyage off the north coast of what was then Santa Cruz County (and is now San Mateo County) in the state of California.

== History ==
On January 28, 1853, Carrier Pigeon left Boston. The clipper was bound for San Francisco on her maiden voyage. As a commercial ship, she was to deliver general merchandise. The ship and her cargo were insured for US$195,000 (equivalent to $7,370,000 in 2024)

In the mid-19th century, the Panama Canal had not yet been constructed, and thus the only way to reach the Pacific Ocean from the Atlantic Ocean was to sail around Cape Horn, an area infamous for its shipwrecks. The prevailing winds in the vicinity of Cape Horn and south, blow from west to east around the world almost uninterrupted by land, giving rise to the "roaring forties" and the even more wild "furious fifties" and "screaming sixties". Despite this, Carrier Pigeon encountered no difficulties rounding the Cape.

On June 6, 1853, the clipper was sighted at Santa Cruz, California. San Francisco is located only about seventy nautical miles (81 mi; 130 km) north of Santa Cruz. The cool California Current offshore, enhanced by upwelling of cold sub-surface waters, often creates summer fog near the coast, and June 6, 1853, was no exception. As night approached, so did the fog. The captain of Carrier Pigeon, Azariah Doane, believed that the ship was far from shore, and so he gave the order to sail eastward toward the shore. In a few minutes the clipper hit the rocky bottom.

Heavy waves rocked the helpless clipper from side to side. The hull was opened to the incoming tide. After seven feet (2.1 m) of cold Pacific water rushed into the ship, the captain and the crew had just a few moments to escape with their lives. Because the ship was wrecked only 500 feet (150 m) from shore, all the members of the crew were able to reach the shore safely.

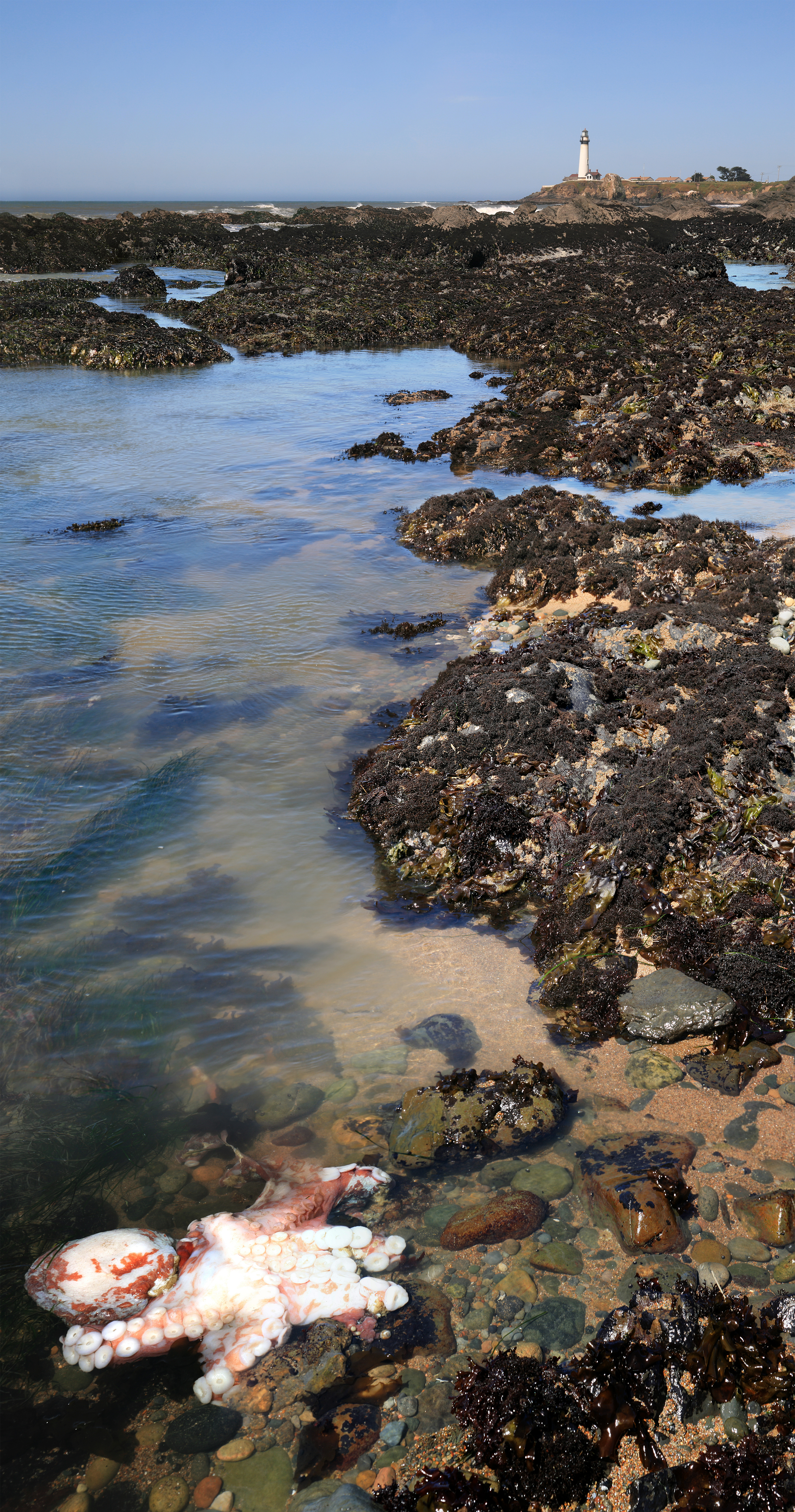
At low tide, the dangerous rocks around the Pigeon Point Lighthouse are visible.

== Steamer Sea Bird and the salvage of Carrier Pigeon ==
The news about the wreck reached San Francisco by the evening of June 7. The U.S. Coast Survey steamer Active was sent to the wreck. Later on, sidewheel steamer Sea Bird joined the efforts in trying to save some cargo and whatever was left of Carrier Pigeon.

Steamer Sea Bird's salvage operations were under the command of the well-known "Bully" Waterman, formerly of Sea Witch. The crew of Pigeon was initially occupied with landing their own baggage through the surf, and wanted to remain ashore. However, Captain Waterman, with his characteristically forceful personality, set the listless crew members to work in the salvage operation, and kept order on the pitching decks as boxes of liquor came to light. The cargo included cases of shoes and footwear, and although it was to the locals' advantage to drop boxes over the side whenever possible, so that they might be scavenged later for personal use, Capt. Waterman put a stop to this.

The following morning, near daybreak, Sea Bird found herself in troubles of her own. As the wind picked up from the northwest with heavy swells, Sea Bird's two anchors began to drag. The ship broke free and started drifting towards the very same rocks that just a day before had wrecked Carrier Pigeon. The owner of Sea Bird, Captain John T. Wright, had detailed knowledge of the area, and was able to maneuver his ship so that it beached a few miles south, on the sandy shore of Point Año Nuevo. This saved Sea Bird from being wrecked, and she was refloated a few months later, in October.

One more ship, Goliah, was sent to help out to salvage as much merchandise as possible from the wreck. Goliah first checked on the safety of Sea Bird before coming to Carrier Pigeon. Goliah was able to transport both the crew of Carrier Pigeon and 1,200 packages of her merchandise north to San Francisco. On June 10, 1853, The Daily Alta California reported about Carrier Pigeon:

Her bows lay about 500 feet from the beach, and she rests amidships on a ledge of rocks, which have broken the ship's back. The tide ebbs and flows in her, and is up to her between-decks.

The salvage operations continued for a few more weeks, but by July, Carrier Pigeon was breaking apart.

== Local stories regarding disposal of the cargo ==
Both wrecks appear to have left an impression on this sparsely populated stretch of the San Mateo County coastline. Despite Capt. Waterman's efforts, several local stories remain regarding the disposal of the cargoes of Carrier Pigeon and Sea Bird.

According to a guidebook published by the California Coastal Commission, the residents of Pescadero recovered a large quantity of white paint from Pigeon which they "used liberally on all the town's buildings", and then maintained the tradition of painting their houses white. However, other sources credit the 1896 wreck of the steamer Columbia as the source of the white paint.

An article in the Wells Fargo Messenger states that a stagecoach salvaged from Carrier Pigeon was laboriously hoisted up the cliffs onto the road, and put into service within a week. The coach, built in Concord, New Hampshire, carried passengers and freight on the Pescadero road for the Wells Fargo Company for forty years, and, in 1914, was listed among the company's prized possessions.

Another tale relates that an Irishman named John Daly, who was employed driving pigs from Santa Cruz to a Pescadero ranch, discovered some lumps of coal from Sea Bird's cargo on the beach at Año Nuevo. Mr. Daly endeavored to parlay his discovery into money which he might spend on whiskey. Since coal deposits had been rumored to exist in the area, Mr. Daly proceeded with his lumps of coal to Santa Cruz, announcing to Captain Brannan and three others that he'd discovered a coal mine at Gazos Creek. After collecting his monetary reward, he led the four men up Gazos Creek in search of the alleged coal outcropping, with the intention of escaping and leaving his benefactors behind empty-handed. However, Captain Brannan, who was armed, managed to capture Daly and extract a confession. Daly was administered a whipping on the spot and later fled the area.

== Naming of Pigeon Point Lighthouse ==
A few years later, in 1871, a lighthouse was built on a point near where the wreck occurred. To commemorate Carrier Pigeon, the structure was named Pigeon Point Lighthouse. This lighthouse is still an active Coast Guard aid to navigation in the area.
