= Loma Mar, California =

Loma Mar
- Census-designated place
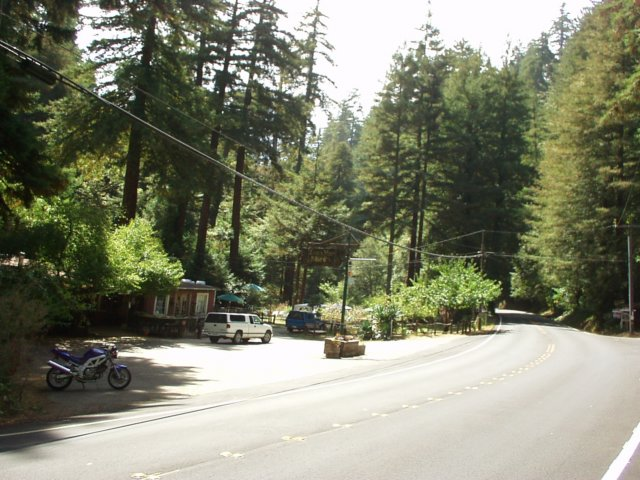
- View of the Loma Mar General Store

- Location within San Mateo County

- Location within the state of California Loma Mar (the United States)
- Coordinates: 37°16′16″N 122°18′27″W
- Country: United States
- State: California
- County: San Mateo

Area
  - Total: 1.733 sq mi (4.488 km^{2})
  - Land: 1.733 sq mi (4.488 km^{2})
  - Water: 0 sq mi (0 km^{2}) 0%
- Elevation: 866 ft (264 m)

Population (2020)
  - Total: 134
  - Density: 77.3/sq mi (29.9/km^{2})
- Time zone: UTC-8 (Pacific (PST))
  - Summer (DST): UTC-7 (PDT)
- ZIP codes: 94021
- Area code: 650
- GNIS feature ID: 2628753

Loma Mar (Spanish for "Sea Hill") is a census-designated place (CDP) in San Mateo County, California, United States. It is near San Mateo County Memorial Park on Pescadero Creek Road and is served by area code 650. Loma Mar is between the towns of Pescadero and La Honda, situated in the Santa Cruz Mountains in the western part of the San Francisco Peninsula. The United States Postal Service has assigned it ZIP Code 94021. As of the census of 2020, there were 134 residents in the CDP. Loma Mar is home to the YMCA's Camp Loma Mar, Redwood Glen Camp and Conference Center as well as a small number of businesses and services including the Loma Mar Store, a post office, and a fire station run by volunteers.

== Geography ==
The town is located within a redwood forest, and is traversed by the Pescadero Creek.

According to the United States Census Bureau, the CDP covers an area of 1.7 square miles (4.5 km^{2}), all land.

== Demographics ==
Historical population
Census	Pop.	Note	%±
2010	113		—
2020	134		18.6%
U.S. Decennial Census; 1850–1870 1880-1890; 1900 1910 1920; 1930 1940 1950; 1960 1970 1980; 1990 2000 2010

Loma Mar first appeared as a census designated place in the 2010 U.S. census.

The 2020 United States census reported that Loma Mar had a population of 134. The population density was 77.3 inhabitants per square mile (29.8/km^{2}). The racial makeup of Loma Mar was 112 (83.6%) White, 2 (1.5%) African American, 0 (0.0%) Native American, 0 (0.0%) Asian, 0 (0.0%) Pacific Islander, 5 (3.7%) from other races, and 15 (11.2%) from two or more races. Hispanic or Latino of any race were 14 persons (10.4%).

The whole population lived in households. There were 57 households, out of which 9 (15.8%) had children under the age of 18 living in them, 27 (47.4%) were married-couple households, 5 (8.8%) were cohabiting couple households, 21 (36.8%) had a female householder with no partner present, and 4 (7.0%) had a male householder with no partner present. 17 households (29.8%) were one person, and 5 (8.8%) were one person aged 65 or older. The average household size was 2.35. There were 35 families (61.4% of all households).

The age distribution was 17 people (12.7%) under the age of 18, 3 people (2.2%) aged 18 to 24, 42 people (31.3%) aged 25 to 44, 31 people (23.1%) aged 45 to 64, and 41 people (30.6%) who were 65 years of age or older. The median age was 49.3 years. There were 56 males and 78 females.

There were 70 housing units at an average density of 40.4 units per square mile (15.6 units/km^{2}), of which 57 (81.4%) were occupied. Of these, 31 (54.4%) were owner-occupied, and 26 (45.6%) were occupied by renters.

== Schools ==
Loma Mar is within the boundaries of the La Honda-Pescadero Unified School District and has a bus stop located on Pescadero Creek Road across from the store, but does not have a school of its own.
