= La Honda–Pescadero Unified School District =

School district in California, United States

Coordinates: 37°17′N 122°19.5′W

Address
- 360 Butano Cutoff Pescadero, San Mateo County, California; United States

District information
- Type: Public school district
- Grades: K–12
- Established: 1965; 61 years ago
- Superintendent: Amy Wooliever
- NCES District ID: 0620220

Students and staff
- Students: 275 (2020–2021)
- Teachers: 22.56 (on an FTE basis)
- Staff: 25.86 (on an FTE basis)
- Student–teacher ratio: 12.19:1

Other information
- Website: www.lhpusd.com

La Honda–Pescadero Unified School District is a K–12 school district in California that serves the south coast of San Mateo County, including the communities of Pescadero, Loma Mar, and La Honda. It consists of three schools: two elementary schools, one in Pescadero and one in La Honda, and a combination middle and high school located in Pescadero. The District Office is located in portables at the southeastern end of the high school campus. As of 2021, the District serves 306 students.

== Schools ==
- Pescadero Middle and High School
- Pescadero Elementary School (official website)
- La Honda Elementary School (official website)

== History ==
Since the mid-19th century, Pescadero has functioned as a hub for education in southwestern San Mateo County, with the opening of a one-room Pescadero schoolhouse in 1858. By 1922, the community had constructed a larger high school on North Street in downtown Pescadero. In 1960, on a tract of land donated by a local family, the Pescadero High School opened in its current location. In 1965, the La Honda−Pescadero Unified School District was opened.

Today, the District draws from a geographic area of over 175 square miles. It is the smallest school district in San Mateo County by population; on average among all grades, the class size is 18 students. In addition, the District requires community service for all graduating high school students, and offers, depending on funding and student interest, community-supported school programs in art, music, theater, outdoor education at YMCA Camp Jones Gulch, sports, and student publications.

== Governance ==
Superintendent

- Amy Wooliever (2011–)
  - Formerly Dennis Dobbs as Interim Superintendent (2010–2011, 1 school year)
  - Formerly Tim Beard (unknown–2010)

School Board

- Mary Windram
- Monica Resendiz
- Dave Meyrovich
- Lisa Mateja
- Renee Erridge

== See also ==
- Pescadero, California
- La Honda, California
