= Pescadero State Beach =

California State Beach

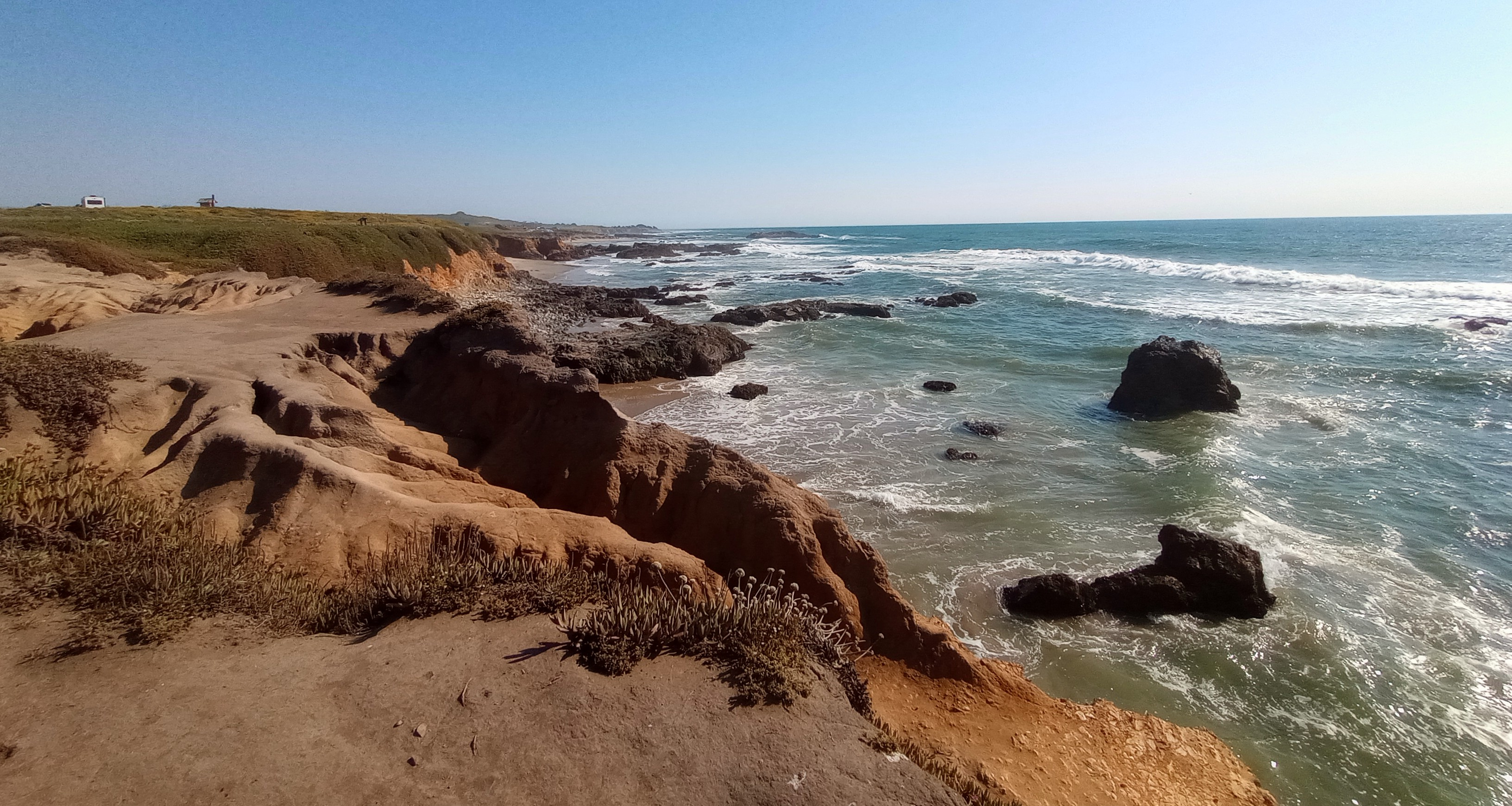

- Location within California
- Location: San Mateo County, California
- Nearest city: Pescadero, California
- Coordinates: 37°15′43″N 122°24′48″W
- Governing body: California Department of Parks and Recreation

Pescadero State Beach (English: fisherman beach) is alongside State Route 1, located 14.5 miles (23.3 km) south of Half Moon Bay and 1.5 miles (2.4 km) west of the city of Pescadero, in San Mateo County, California. The beach has a 1 mile (1.6 km)-long shoreline with sandy coves, rocky cliffs, tide pools, fishing spots and picnic facilities.

Across the highway is Pescadero Marsh Natural Preserve, a popular spot for bird watchers and other naturalists.

== About ==
Pescadero State Beach has two distinct beach areas that are divided by the Pescadero creek. The northern beach is wider and more sandy and the southern beach is more rocky. The northern beach eventually connects to Pomponio State Beach and San Gregorio State Beach, depending on the tide levels. The park is also host to a natural marsh and wetlands area.

The nature preserve is a refuge for steelhead fish, blue herons, kites, deer, raccoons, foxes, skunks, barn swallows, and weasels. The black oystercatcher, a common bird of northern California's rocky shoreline, is also seen there.

The shoreline at the center and southern parking areas is protected from ocean waves by offshore rocks, with numerous tide pools and areas of open water. That habitat is frequently occupied by both the Steller sea lion and the harbor seal. The pinnipeds sun themselves by hauling onto the offshore rocks, and then slide back into the water to hunt nearby.

Dogs, camping and fires are not allowed on the beach. Fishermen seek fish and mollusks, primarily mussels. A California state fishing license is required for those activities.

Pescadero State Beach

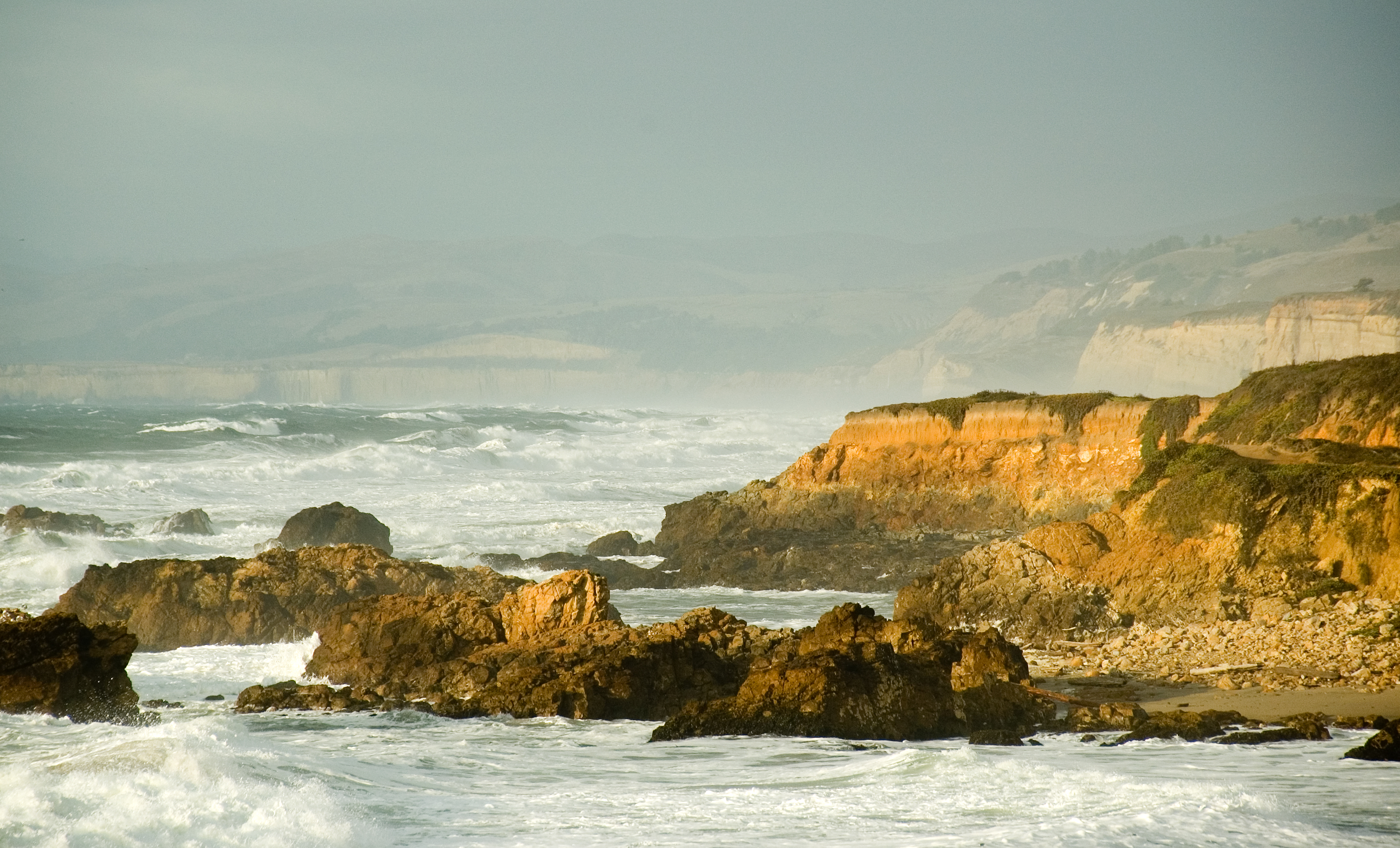
Pescadero State Beach

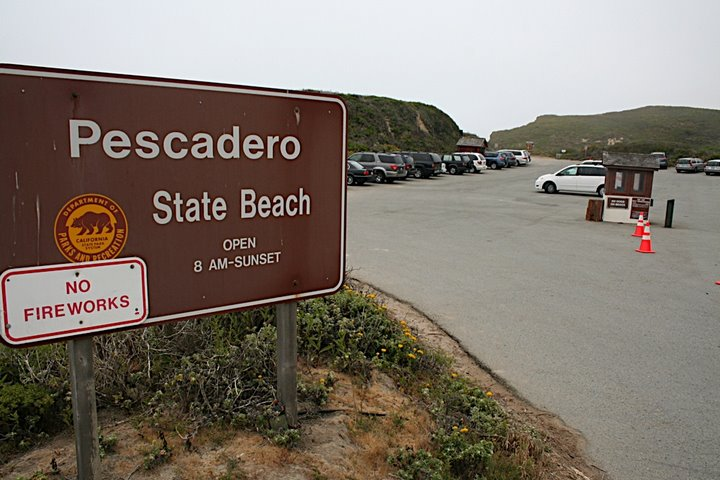
Pescadero State Beach

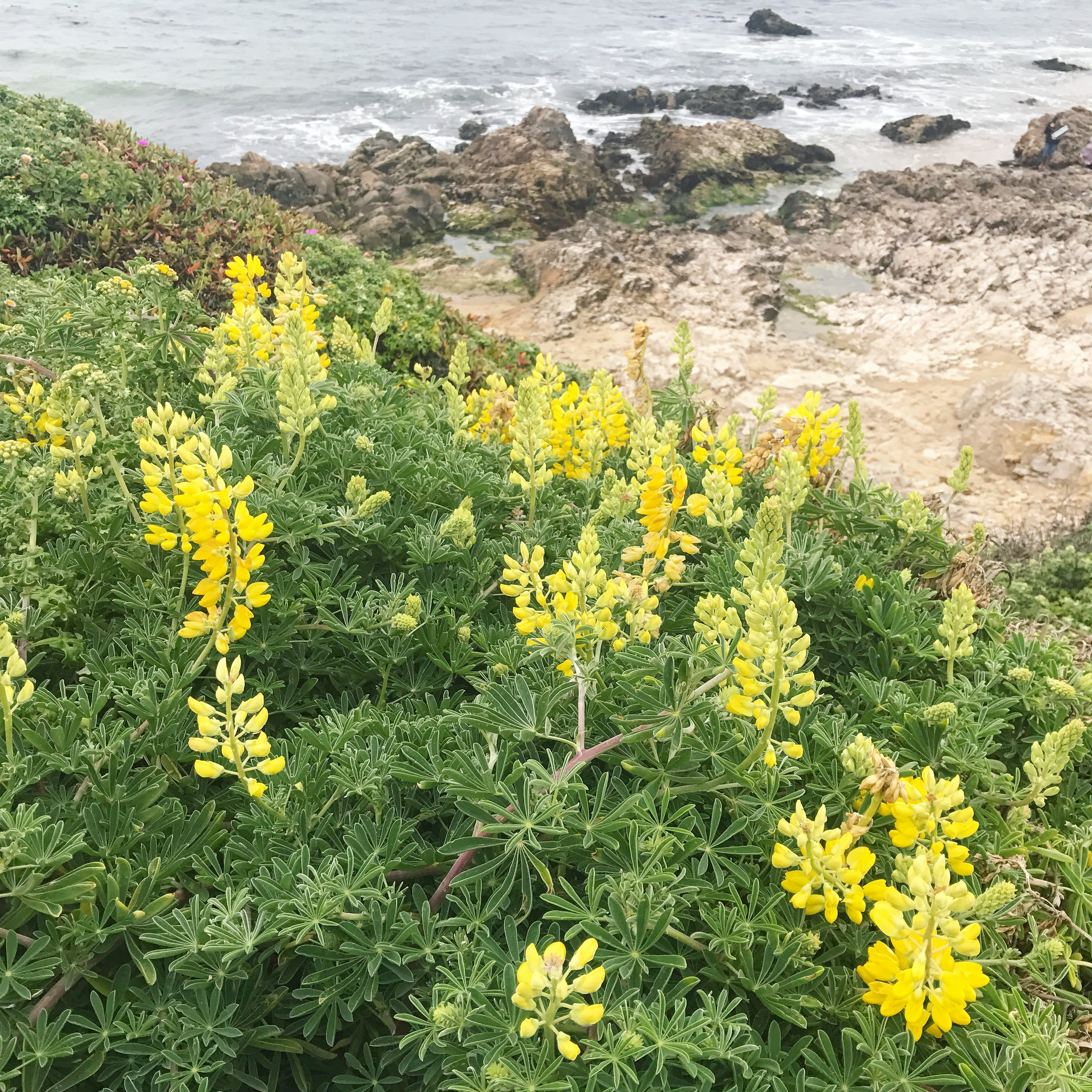
Lupinus arboreus in bloom

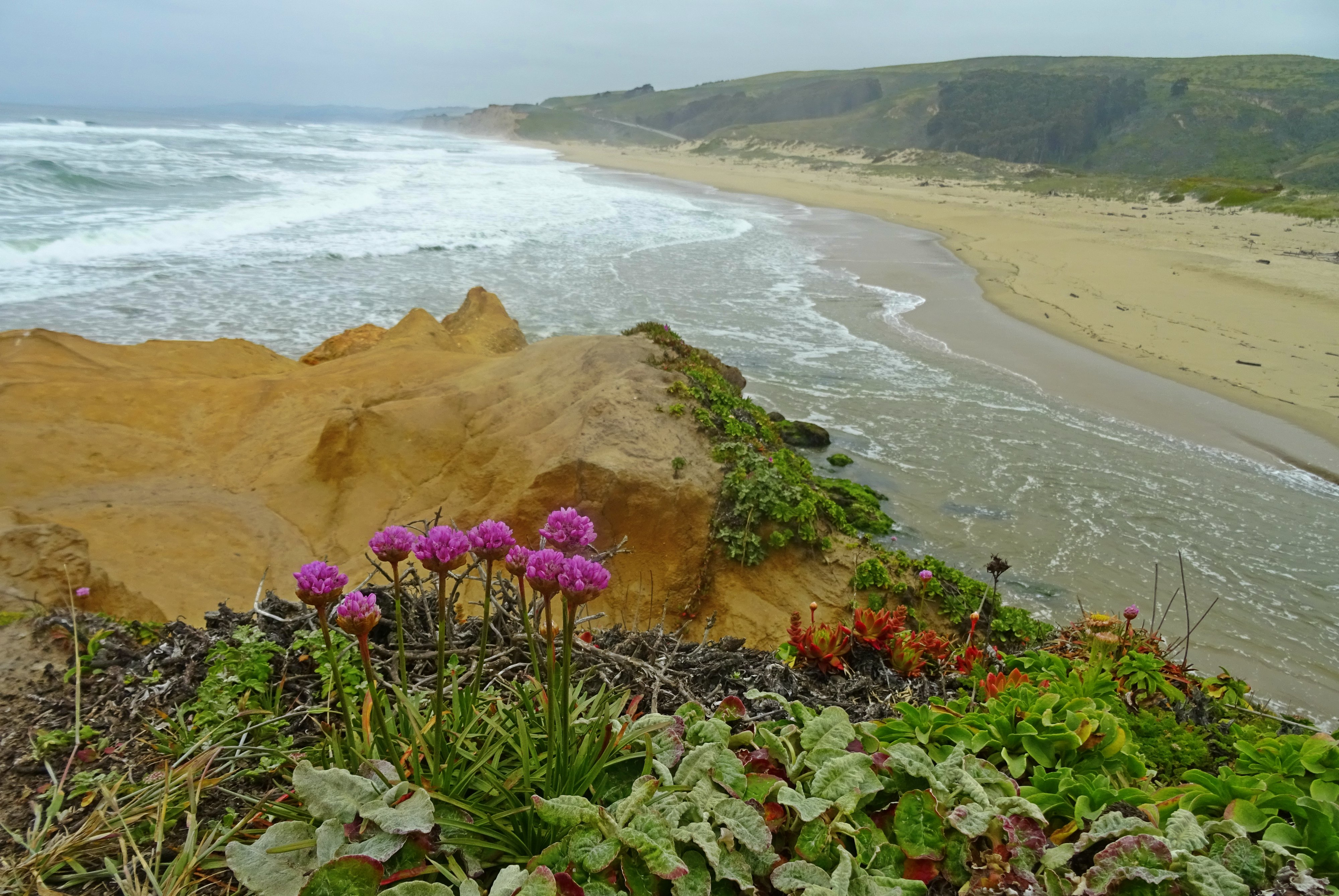
Armeria maritima californica in bloom.

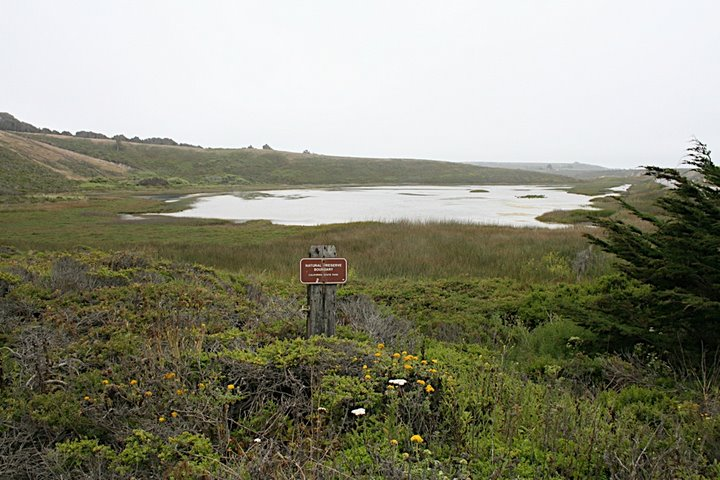
Pescadero Marsh Natural Preserve

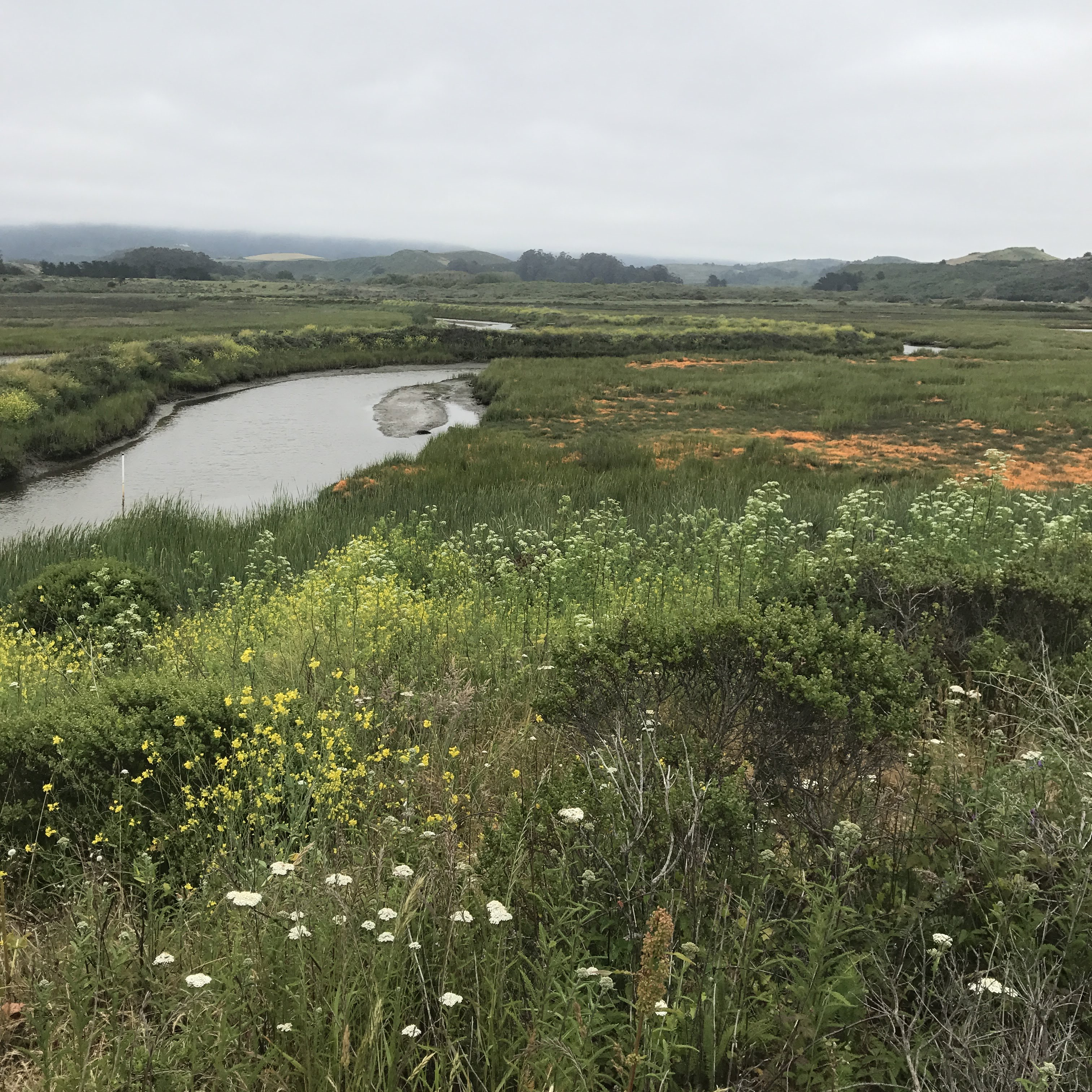
Pescadero Marsh Natural Preserve

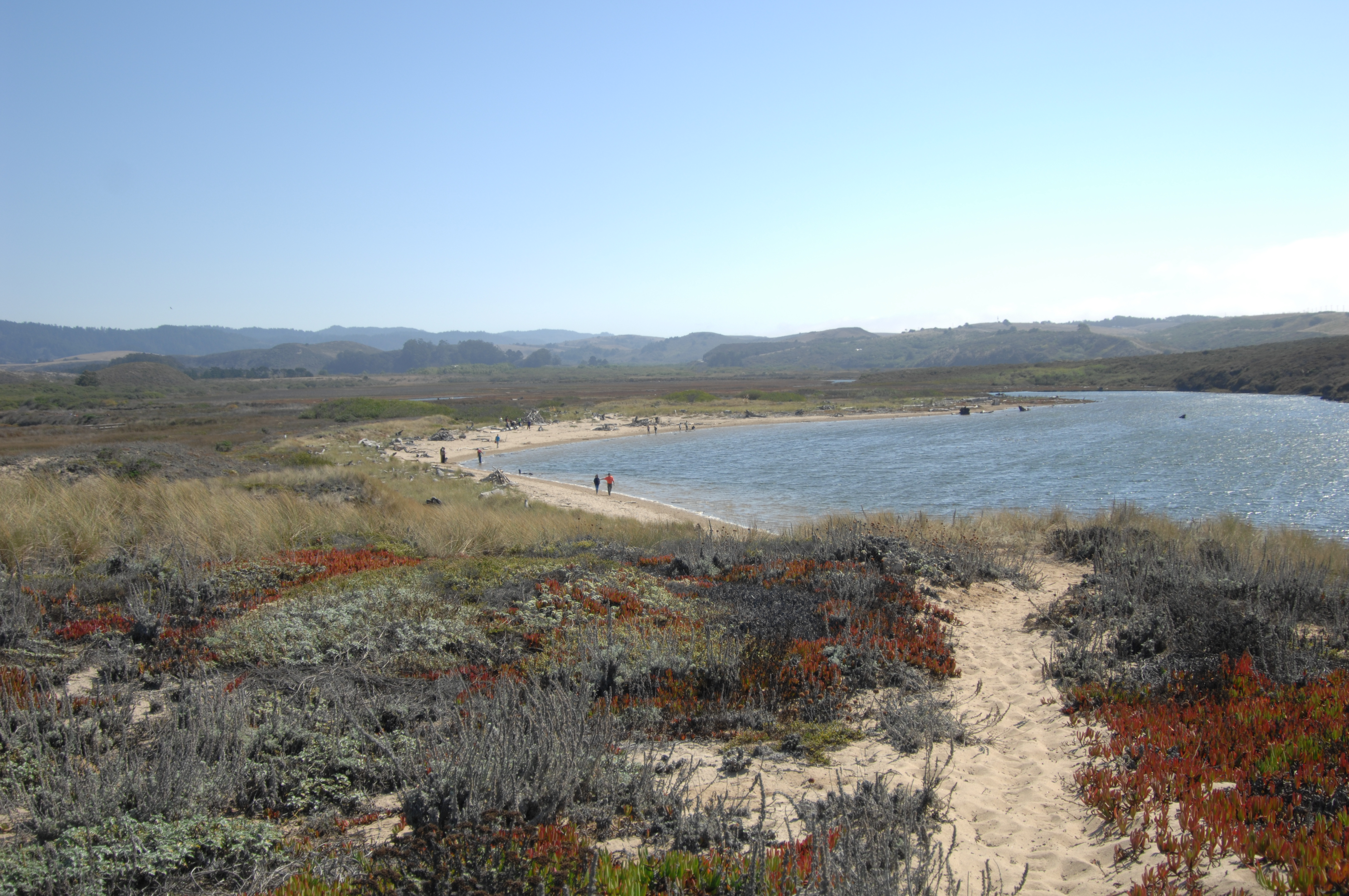
Pescadero Lagoon

== See also ==
- List of beaches in California
- List of California state parks
