= KPDO =

Radio station in Pescadero, California

Coordinates: 37°14′39.8″N 122°24′36.9″W

Pescadero, California; United States
- Frequency: 89.3 MHz
- Branding: KPDO 89.3 FM Community Radio for Pescadero and the South Coast

Programming
- Format: Eclectic
- Affiliations: National Federation of Community Broadcasters

Ownership
- Owner: Pescadero Public Radio Service

History
- First air date: May 8, 2010

Technical information
- Licensing authority: FCC
- Facility ID: 89081
- Class: A
- ERP: 100 watts
- HAAT: -6.6 meters

Links
- Public license information: Public file; LMS
- Webcast: Listen Live
- Website: kpdo.net

KPDO is a community radio station licensed to 89.3 MHz in Pescadero, California. It is non-commercial and listener-sponsored.

The station provides public affairs, news, and music programming, both locally and nationally sourced. It is an affiliate of the weekly syndicated Pink Floyd show "Floydian Slip."

As of October 2011, the FCC had granted special temporary authority to remain silent until June 2012. KPDO resumed operating on June 14, 2012.

== See also ==
- Community radio
