= Pescadero Middle and High School =

Location
- 350 Butano Cutoff; Pescadero, California 94060; USA; 37°14′53″N 122°21′52″W

Information
- Established: 1922
- School district: La Honda-Pescadero Unified School District
- Superintendent: Amy Wooliever
- NCES School ID: 062022002423
- Principal: Phillip Hophan
- Grades: 6th-12th grade
- Age range: 11-19
- Enrollment: 159 (2019–20)
- Colors: Maroon and Black
- Mascot: Vikings
- Newspaper: The Pescadero Post

Pescadero Middle and High School is a public school located in Pescadero, California, United States, the only middle and high school within the La Honda–Pescadero Unified School District. Serving 159 students in grades 6–12 as of the 2019–2020 school year, it is the most sparsely populated comprehensive public middle and high school in San Mateo County. The school was founded in 1922, and is designated as a Necessary Small School by the California legislature, meaning the school receives government funds to subsidize its operating costs.

== About ==
Pescadero Middle and High School is part of the La Honda–Pescadero Unified School District. In general, the school includes students in grades 6–12 from Pescadero, along with grades 9–12 from La Honda. (La Honda Elementary School serves grades K–8, while Pescadero Elementary School only serves grades K–5.) The rural nature of southern San Mateo County means that the school draws from an area of over 175 square miles, serving as the region's only high school and a significant event space for the community.

The district is the smallest unified school district in San Mateo County by population, yet largest by geographic size. The school is designated as both a Title I School and a Necessary Small School, the latter of which results in state funding on a per-classroom basis, as opposed to a per-student basis, which would otherwise be too low to maintain operations. In recent years, local news coverage has highlighted the school's community, calling it a "big family":

"How small is this school near the coast of San Mateo County? So small that faculty, staff, and students park in the same lot, taking up about 15 slots. So small that there is just one hallway of lockers, with some empties waiting at the end and others left open because the owners forgot the combination. So small that if students want to leave campus at lunch, they have to come into the office and ask the principal. So small that the high school Yearbook is combined with the middle school's, to fill the pages." — Sam Whiting, staff writer for San Francisco Chronicle

As of the 2021–2022 school year, the school offers middle school cross country, high school girls volleyball, and high school boys soccer. Sports are supported by the Vikings Boosters parent group. Twice a year, the school hosts School Cleanup Days, where students, families, and community members participate in cleanup, small maintenance, and large-scale mural projects. The Pescadero Education Foundation, established in 1997, funds various activities and services, including an annual school picnic, field trips, assemblies, garden programs, and more.

=== Academic offerings ===
In addition to "core" academic subjects, Pescadero Middle and High School offers Spanish classes, visual arts classes, and optional electives, which include concurrent enrollment with a local community college and project-based community service. In fall 2021, the school introduced an Advisory Block class for all students. The program, which runs for 30 minutes every Wednesday, includes curriculum focused on college and career readiness, student leadership, community service, and socio-emotional learning.

== History ==
In the 1850s, settlers began moving to the Pescadero area, mostly for the plentiful land in the region able to be farmed. As more families moved into the area, other establishments, including a blacksmith shop, a stage, and a hotel, were opened. In 1857, one of Pescadero's earliest settlers, Alexander Moore, began to search for a teacher to instruct students in the community. In 1858, Dr. Isaac R. Goodspeed, who had served for years as one of San Mateo's most prominent physicians, began his work as a teacher in the Pescadero school.

In 1922, Pescadero High School first opened, in a tall white structure at the center of town. Three years later, a new building opened on North Street, nestled within a mix of residential buildings and farming operations. A local family donated a tract of farmland to the La Honda-Pescadero Unified School District in the late 1950s, the location of the present day high school, which was completed before the 1960 school year.

In the late 1990s, the district proposed opening a middle school for grades 6–8, as the two existing schools for K–8 students, Pescadero Elementary and La Honda Elementary, were reaching capacity. The community was divided over whether to develop a site in Pescadero or La Honda, as the two towns are roughly 30 minutes apart. Ultimately, given that there was unused land on Pescadero High School's site, the district chose to build a middle school on the same campus, while keeping La Honda Elementary School a K–8 school.

Construction for the new middle school coincided with renovations to the high school, valued at $20 million, which were designed by Sally Swanson Architects and began in 2006. In late 2010, as construction for new classrooms stalled and the school lacked enough portable classrooms for middle school students, sixth graders were temporarily moved to Pescadero Elementary School. The Zahn Group, which was involved in project management, was fired in 2008 after nearly finishing construction on two buildings without necessary approvals from the California Division of the State Architect and the California Coastal Commission, and without hiring an independent inspector to oversee compliance.

Two additional wings for the school were planned, but never constructed, because the total population has remained around 150 students. Today, the school functions as a center for the community, hosting athletic and cultural events and providing entertainment space. During the CZU Lightning Complex fires in 2020, local residents gathered at the high school for emergency services and updates about relocation.

== School property ==
Pescadero Middle and High School's campus is surrounded on all four sides by farmland. Pescadero Creek runs to the north and east of the campus. In addition to holding classrooms, the District office is located on campus, as are two tennis courts, two basketball courts, and a grass field used for soccer and baseball by the community.

In December 2000, District administrators proposed building a 45-unit complex of townhouses for local teachers on the school's campus, although the project has never been studied or completed.

Due to its rural location, the school is not easily accessed by walking, and most homes in downtown Pescadero are five minute away. The school is not served by public transportation.

=== School groundwater ===
Fertilizer is used on some farms surrounding the school property. As a result, an unsafe level of nitrate, one of the chemical ingredients used in fertilizer, has seeped into the groundwater; local investigations have found that water from the region contains as much as 290 milligrams, 29 times the amount deemed safe by the Environmental Protection Agency. Given that prolonged exposure to nitrate can cause serious health problems, students cannot drink from the water fountains on campus, which are connected to an underground well. Instead, the state ships 76 five-gallon water bottles to campus biweekly, allowing students to drink from one of three jugs on campus. Campus staff, including the kitchen cook, use the same supply. The system has been in place since the late 1990s.

The District has proposed solutions like drilling a new, deeper well at the school or working with the water utility to run pipes from miles away, but these options have been labeled as exorbitantly expensive. Although researchers have noted that there are many rural communities across California which lack access to clean water, Pescadero High School is unique in that it is in resource-rich San Mateo County and less than an hour away from Silicon Valley.

In 1988, the Pescadero special utility district, which provides clean drinking water to local residents and businesses, was established. Although the campus currently lies outside the district, in June 2020, San Mateo County leaders began steps to expand the district's borders to include the campus and the Pescadero fire station. Although the certification of the expansion and engineering stages will take several years, local leaders have secured funding from the California State Water Resources Control Board. As of 2022, the project is expected to be completed in 2025.

=== Earthquake potential ===
In 2011, investigative journalism organization California Watch profiled hundreds of schools across California that do not meet the legal construction codes for earthquake safety. Among the most high-profile of the schools was Pescadero Middle and High School, partially due to allegations that school officials have neglected to perform mandatory safety inspections on campus since the early 1980s. Under California law, it is illegal for school officials to allow children to enter buildings that are not approved by inspectors from the Department of the State Architect. Two residents, Bryan Burns and Jeff Gananian, attempted for several years to take legal action against board members and employees at the district who they alleged were responsible for troubled and incorrect construction projects on campus in the late 2000s.

Among the 12 buildings Burns and Gananian identify on campus, one is the school's gymnasium, which has a broken roof and cracks in the foundation. Local coverage has identified this building as particularly troubling, due to the fact that the gymnasium is the location where the community is told to go during emergencies, including earthquake warnings. In the past, paperwork submitted by the district to the Division of the State Architect has incorrectly labelled this building as a classroom, and later as two buildings, the gym and the administration building.

Furthermore, the 1972 Alquist-Priolo Earthquake Fault Zoning Act requires maps of California to be drawn with earthquake hazard zones. In 1976, a map of Franklin Point Quadrangle showed Pescadero High School firmly within a fault zone. Six years later, the map was redrawn showing the hazard zone taking a sharp right angle, carving a secure zone around the school. This distinction decreases the number of safety assessments required to be submitted to the community before renovating or building on the site. Engineers and geologists alike have noted that the right angle precision of the hazard zone is unlikely, perhaps suggesting that real estate agents and other interest groups hurt by the hazard zone distinction pressured a re-evaluation that would "water down" the map. A map of the area's hazard zones has not been redrawn since 1982.

== Statistics ==
=== Demographics ===
Despite functioning as one school, demographics data are categorized by the District into Pescadero Elementary and Middle School (grades K-8) and Pescadero High School (grades 9-12).

2019–2020 for Pescadero High School (grades 9-12):

- 86 students: 32 male (37.2%), 54 female (62.8%)

	Hispanic	White	Asian	African American	Pacific Islander	American Indian	Two or More Races	Total
Students	57	26	0	0	0	0	3	86
Total %	66.3%	30.2%	0.0%	0.0%	0.0%	0.0%	3.5%	100%

Among the student body:

- 1.2% of students are foster youth
- 23.3 of students are English language learners
- 12.5% of students receive special education services
- 64% of students are eligible for free and reduced-price lunch

2019-2020 for Pescadero Middle School (grades 6-8):

- 73 students

== See also ==
- La Honda–Pescadero Unified School District
- San Mateo County high schools
- Pescadero, California
