= First Congregational Church of Pescadero =

Historic church in California, United States

- U.S. National Register of Historic Places
- California Historical Landmark
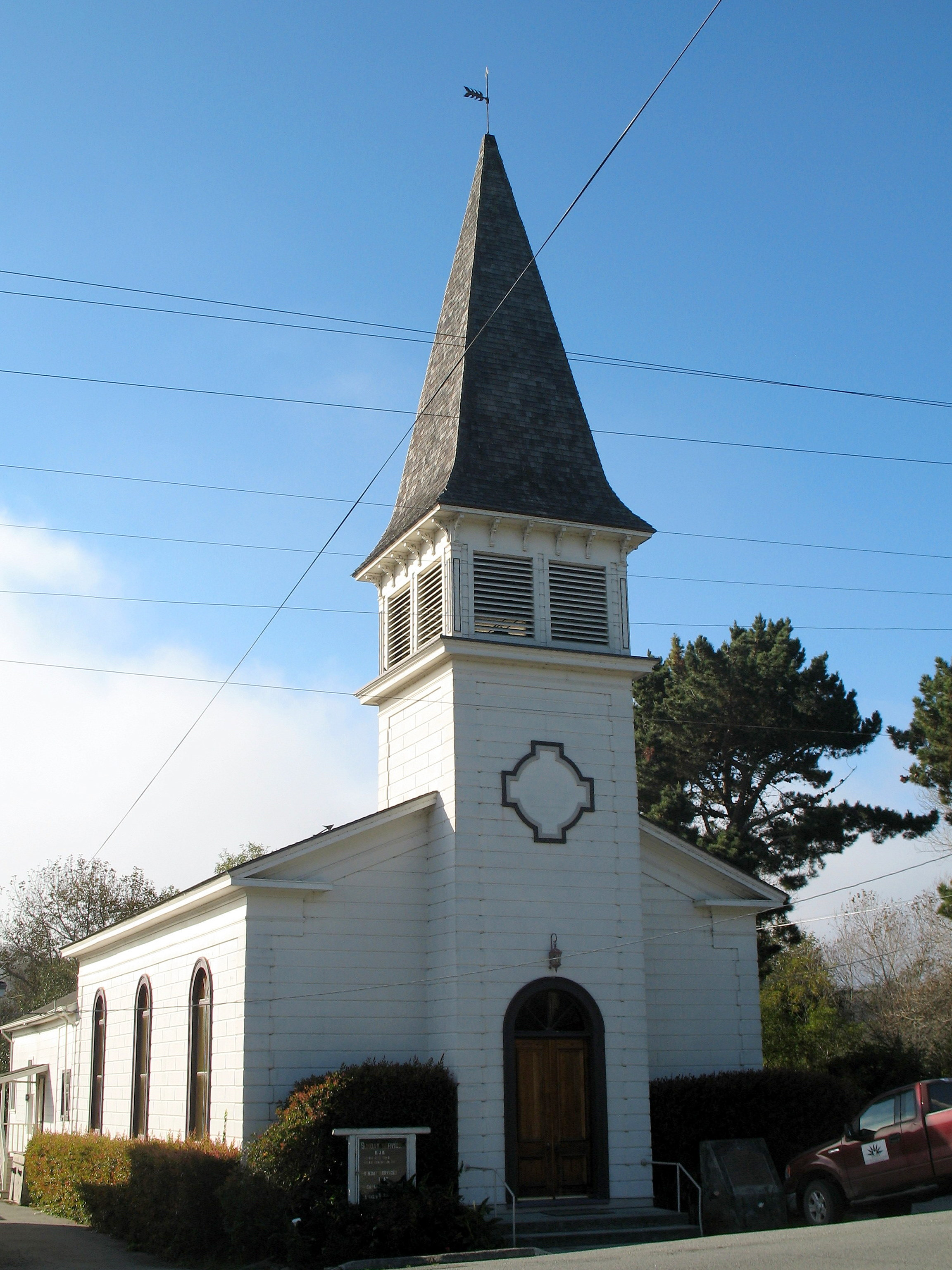

- Location within California Location within the United States
- Location: Stage Road, Pescadero, California
- Coordinates: 37°15′16″N 122°23′01″W
- Area: 0.4 acres (0.16 ha)
- Built: 1867, 1890
- Architect/builder: Charles F. Wilson (steeple only)
- Architectural style: Classical Revival
- NRHP reference No.: 80000856
- CHISL No.: 949
- Added to NRHP: October 31, 1980

The First Congregational Church of Pescadero, also known as the Pescadero Community Church, is a historic United Church of Christ on Stage Road, in Pescadero, California.

It was built in May 1867 and added to the National Register of Historic Places in 1980. The listing included the church building, and a contributing structure and a contributing site.

The shape of the church's 40 feet (12 m) tall steeple suggests Gothic Revival style, but wasn't added until 1890, being added by local carpenter and church member Charles Wilson. Otherwise the church has Classical Revival details.

It is significant as "the first church building to be constructed in the town of Pescadero solely for religious purposes. It is now the oldest, surviving wooden church building on its original site and in continuous church usage and without major renovations in the San Francisco Peninsula and Santa Clara Valley region."
