= Camp Loma Mar =

YMCA summer camp in Loma Mar, California, US

Coordinates: 37.2758°N 122.2825°W

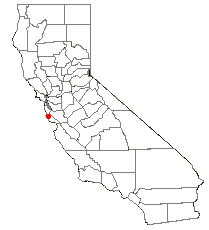
Location of Camp Loma Mar

YMCA Camp Loma Mar is a coed resident summer camp serving youth from ages 7–17. It is located in Loma Mar, an unincorporated area in San Mateo County, California. It has been in operation since 1914, and has been owned by the YMCA since 1937. It is affiliated with the YMCA of the East Bay, headquartered in Oakland, California. It is open year-round, and when summer camp is not in session, Camp Loma Mar is in use as a facility for conferences and retreats, as well as a nonprofit outdoor education program.

Camp Loma Mar is surrounded by redwoods in the Santa Cruz Mountains, 10 miles east from the Pacific Ocean and 15 miles south of Half Moon Bay. The facilities on Camp Loma Mar's 100 acres include a swimming pool, an arts and crafts pavilion, a climbing wall, a zip line, an archery range, hiking trails, basketball and volleyball courts, Loma Mar's iconic gaga pit, and the requisite stage and campfire pit. Camp Loma Mar used to also have a low ropes course where remnants of it can still be seen near the creek close to their archery range

Camp Loma Mar was also where the renowned Ragger Program was conceived and piloted in 1914.
