= Pigeon Point Lighthouse =

Historic lighthouse in California, United States

Pigeon Point Lighthouse Pigeon Point Lighthouse
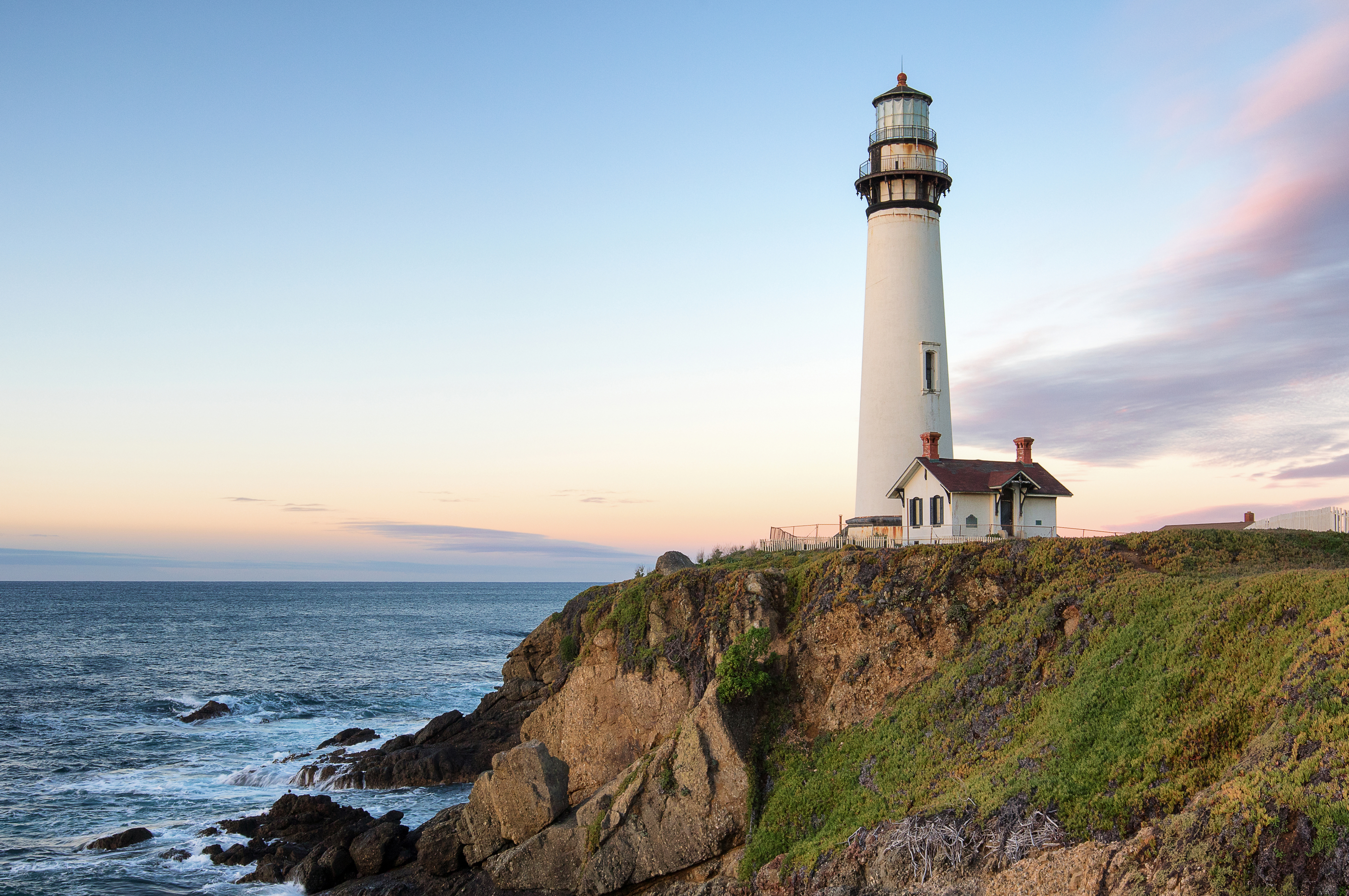
- Pigeon Point Lighthouse in 2016
- Location: Pigeon Point southern to San Francisco Bay; California; United States
- Coordinates: 37°10′54.3″N 122°23′38.1″W

Tower
- Constructed: 1871
- Foundation: stone
- Construction: brick tower
- Automated: 1974
- Height: 115 ft (35 m)
- Shape: tapered cylindrical tower with balcony and lantern attached to workroom
- Markings: white tower, black trim
- Operator: Pigeon Point Lighthouse State Historic Park
- Heritage: National Register of Historic Places listed place, California Historical Landmark

Light
- First lit: 1872
- Focal height: 148 ft (45 m)
- Lens: First order Fresnel lens (1872), DCB-24 aerobeacon (current)
- Range: 24 nmi (44 km; 28 mi)
- Characteristic: Flashing white 10s, Emergency light of reduced intensity when main light is extinguished.

U.S. National Register of Historic Places
- Designated: 1977
- Reference no.: 77000337

California Historical Landmark
- Designated: 1980
- Reference no.: 930

Pigeon Point Light Station or Pigeon Point Lighthouse is a lighthouse built in 1871 to guide ships on the Pacific coast of California. It is the tallest lighthouse (tied with Point Arena Light) on the West Coast of the United States. It is still an active Coast Guard aid to navigation. Pigeon Point Light Station is located on the coastal highway (State Route 1), 5 miles (8 km) south of Pescadero, California, between Santa Cruz and San Francisco. The 115-foot (35 m), white masonry tower, resembles the typical New England structure.

The lighthouse and the land around have been preserved as Pigeon Point Light Station State Historic Park, a California state park. The lighthouse is also listed on the National Register of Historic Places, and designated as a California Historical Landmark. The lighthouse is currently undergoing major renovations funded by the California state legislature in 2021. Research published 2022 by the San Mateo County Office of Sustainability found that the lighthouse was vulnerable to erosion caused by sea level rise.

== History ==
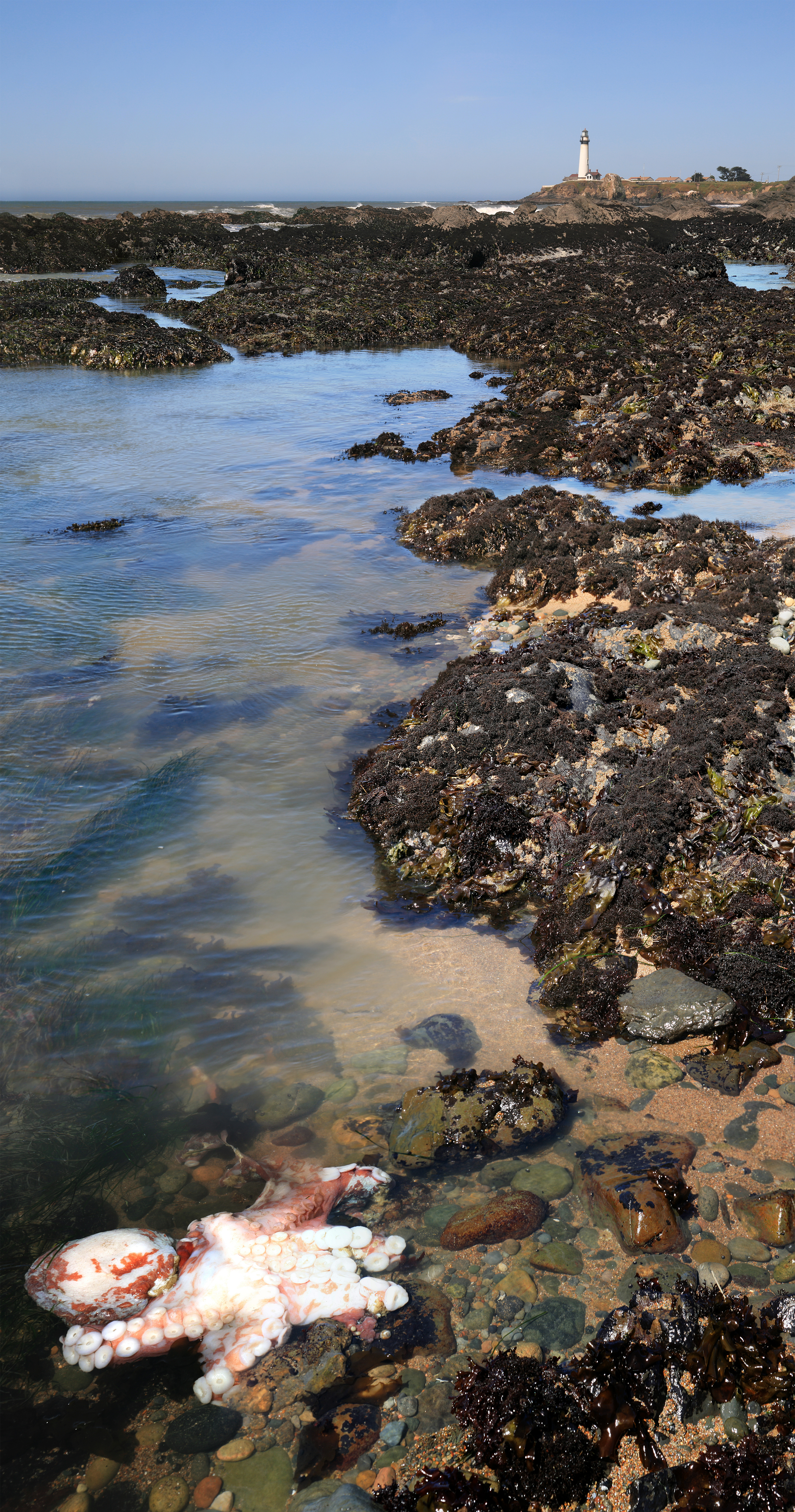
Pigeon Point Lighthouse and tide pools

Pigeon Point Lighthouse is one of the most picturesque lighthouses on the Pacific coast. The tower stands on a rocky promontory and has long been a landmark for ships approaching San Francisco Bay from the south. This headland, and the lighthouse, took its name from the ship Carrier Pigeon that wrecked there in 1853.

The lantern room of the tower is no longer equipped with the original first-order, 1000-watt Fresnel lens. No longer illuminated for demonstration purposes, the lens has 24 flash panels, is composed of 1008 hand-polished lenses and prisms and is capable of producing over 500,000 candlepower illumination. It was manufactured by the Henry-LePaute company in Paris, France, and was first lit at Pigeon Point at sunset on November 15, 1872.

Originally the tower was equipped with a lamp that burned refined lard oil (pig fat). In 1888, that lamp was replaced with a mineral oil (kerosene) lamp. To produce Pigeon Point's assigned characteristic of one white flash of light every ten seconds, the one ton lens rotated one time every four minutes. When observed from a distance, this resulted in the appearance of one white flash of light every ten seconds. The lens rotation was originally powered by a clockworks and 45 pounds (20 kg) weight. In 1926 the lighthouse was provided with electricity. Modern innovations were incorporated and the kerosene IOV lamp was replaced by a 1000 watt bulb, the clockworks by an electric motor and an electrically operated fog signal was eventually installed.

The lighthouse has been designated California Historical Landmark number 930. In 1972, the United States Coast Guard mounted a 24-inch (610 mm) aerobeacon on the front of the tower (now replaced by a smaller beacon) and officially retired the Fresnel lens from regular duty. The First order Fresnel lens is no longer lit to celebrate special occasions, such as the annual lighting of the lens, which usually occurred in mid-November (closest Saturday to November 15) the date of the original first lighting in 1872. The lens was removed from the top of the tower in November 2011, to now be displayed in the fog signal building, adjacent to the base of the lighthouse. The light outside the lens room, mounted on a small verandah at the top of the 100-foot (30 m) tower, rotating with six beams, is still an active aid to navigation.

The first order fresnel lens of the Pigeon Point Lighthouse originally came from the Cape Hatteras Lighthouse, which has the same lens characteristic. Following the deactivation of the original tower in 1870, the lens, which had only been installed in 1863 was removed and put into storage. Shortly thereafter in 1871 it was shipped to the west coast to be installed in the new lighthouse.

=== Renovation ===
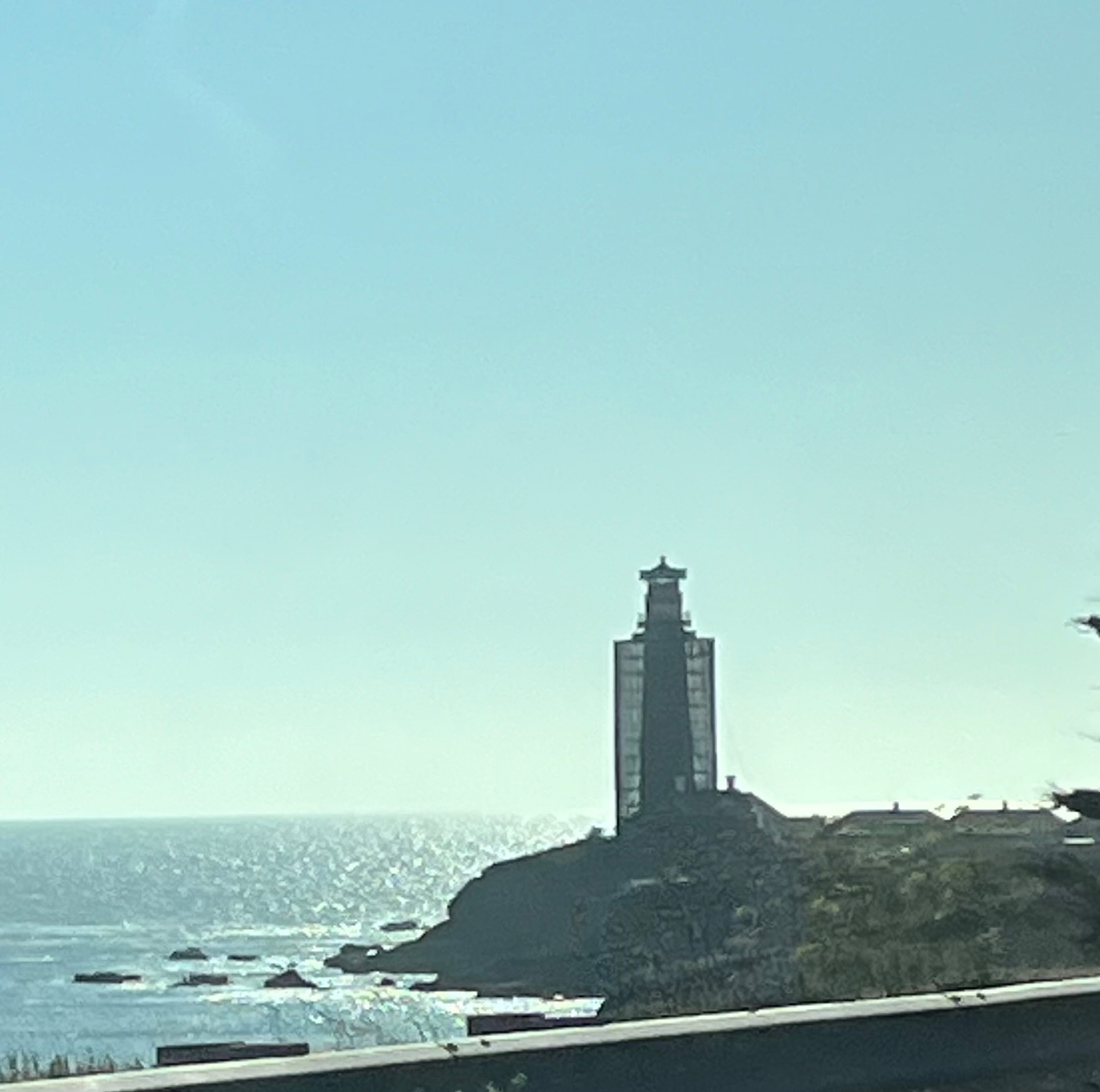
The lighthouse surrounded by scaffolding in 2024, view looking northwest from the highway

The tower has been closed to tours since December 2001 because of the collapse of brickwork supporting outside access metal walkways on the top of the structure. Cast iron was used rather than steel. Cast iron absorbs water rather than repelling it like steel, thus the walkways are severely rusted, as are the major binding ring bands at the base of the tower. The California State Park system has promised repairs, but it is estimated that even if funds were available, it would be seven to ten years before the repairs would be completed. In July, 2010, Rep. Anna G. Eshoo (D-Palo Alto) stated that of the $3.4 million she requested for her district through the Fiscal Year 2011 Interior and Environment Appropriations Act, $250,000 will be allocated to restore the upper portion of the lighthouse.

In 2021, an $18 million provision was made in the California state budget for the full restoration of the lighthouse. In December 2023, California State Parks said in a press release that a $16 million rehabilitation project will start in early 2024 and is expected to be completed within two years.

=== Contemporary uses ===
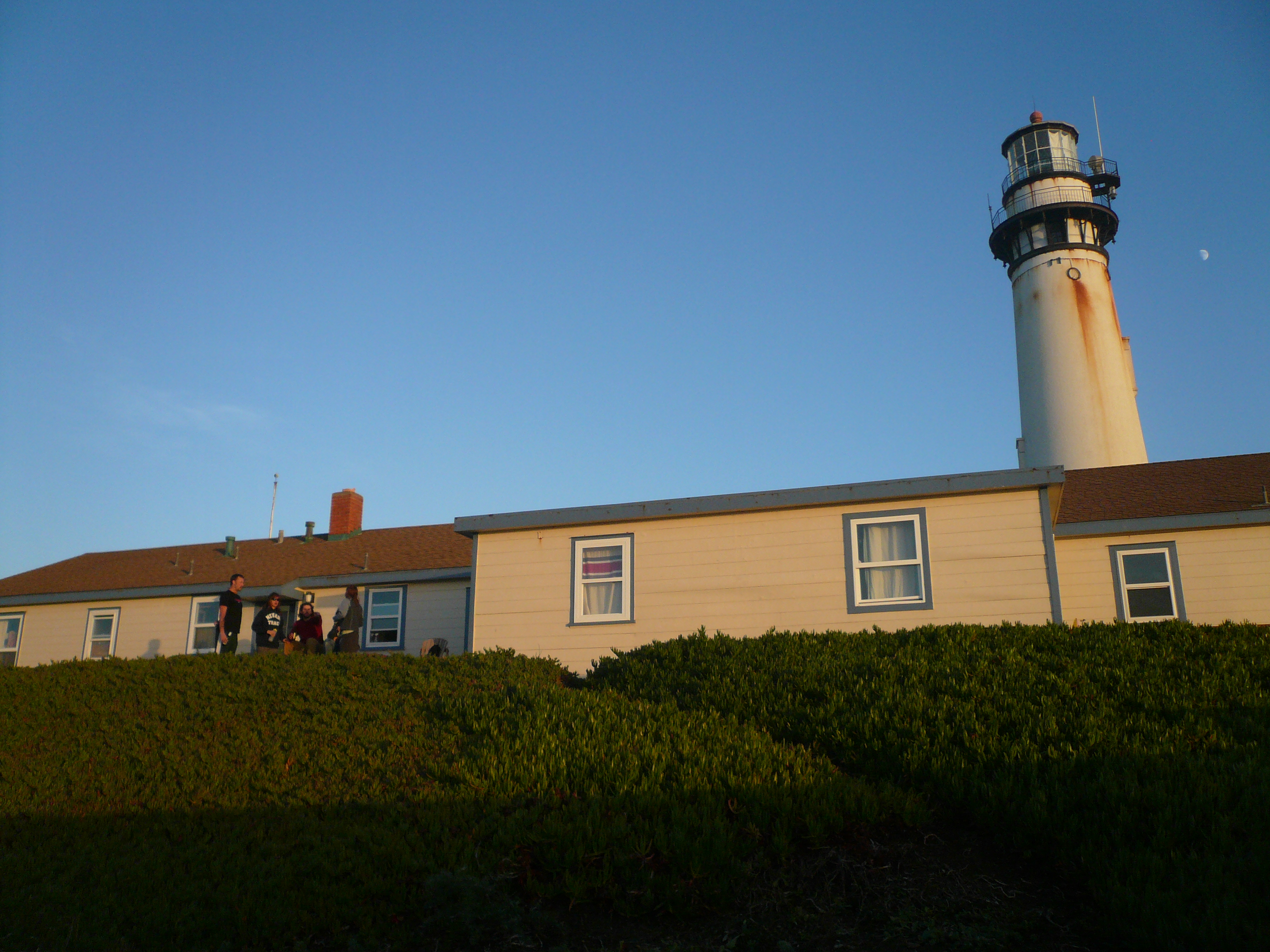
The hostel

The restored lighthouse keepers' housing has, since the mid-1960s, also served as a youth hostel for travelers. The hostel is operated by HI USA, a nonprofit organization devoted to helping the young gain a greater understanding of the world and its people through hosteling.

The Pigeon Point Lighthouse is also a logo of the E. W. Scripps Company.

== Astrophotography ==
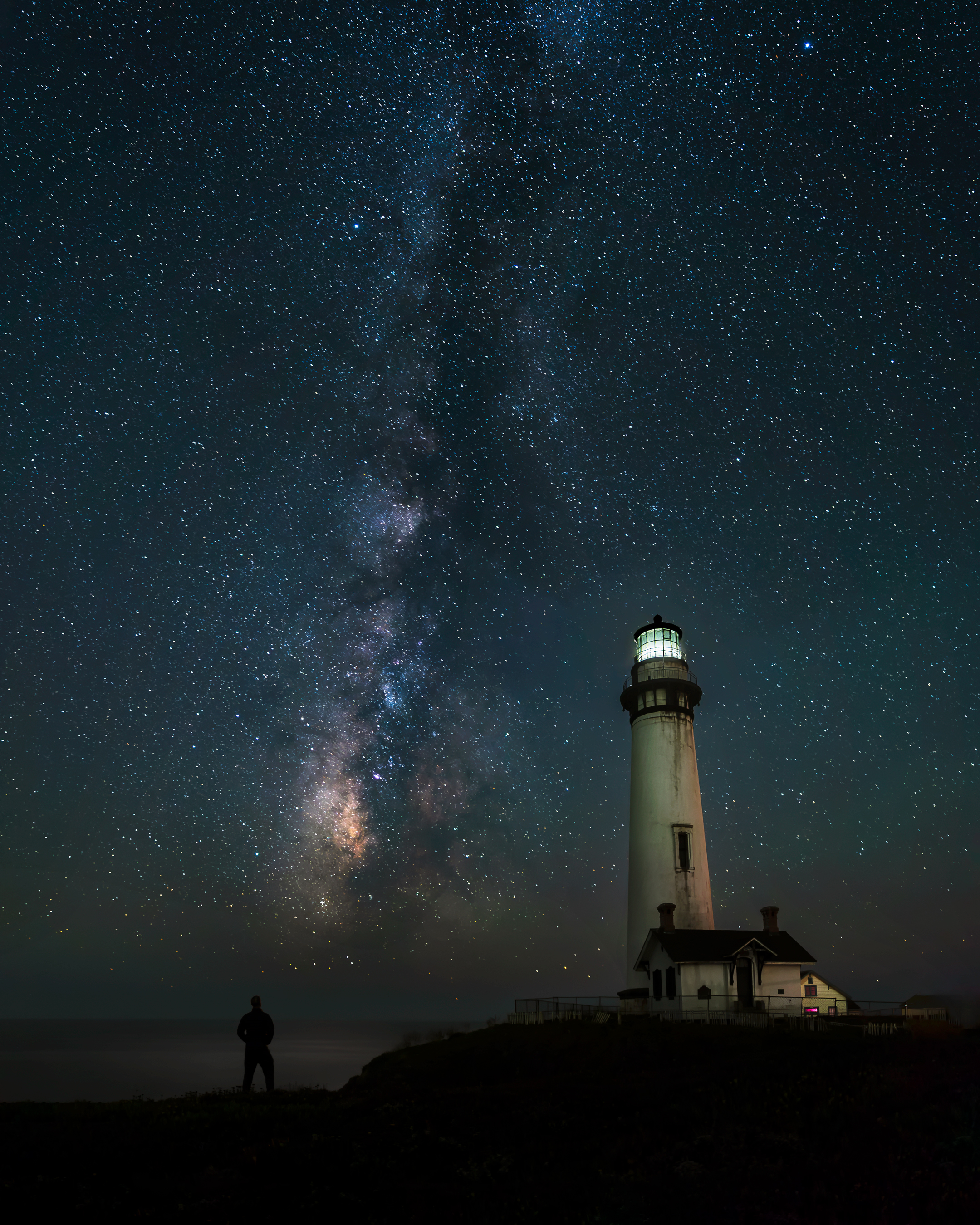
Pigeon Point Lighthouse set against the backdrop of the Milky Way galaxy.

Pigeon Point Lighthouse has become a popular destination for astrophotographers due to its unique location and surrounding landscape.

Pigeon Point Lighthouse's main advantage in astrophotography is its open coastal horizon, which provides an unobstructed view of the night sky. Combined with relatively stable atmospheric conditions and low levels of light pollution, this enhances the visibility of celestial objects and reduces distortion. The lighthouse itself is also a foreground element, blending the historical architecture with the astronomical scene to create visually striking compositions.

Every year, many astronomy enthusiasts gather at Pigeon Point Lighthouse to witness celestial phenomena such as meteor showers, solar and lunar eclipses. They often record these scenes with cameras and post them on social media platforms.

As a result, Pigeon Point Lighthouse is not only a famous landmark but also an important location for astrophotography.

== Image gallery ==
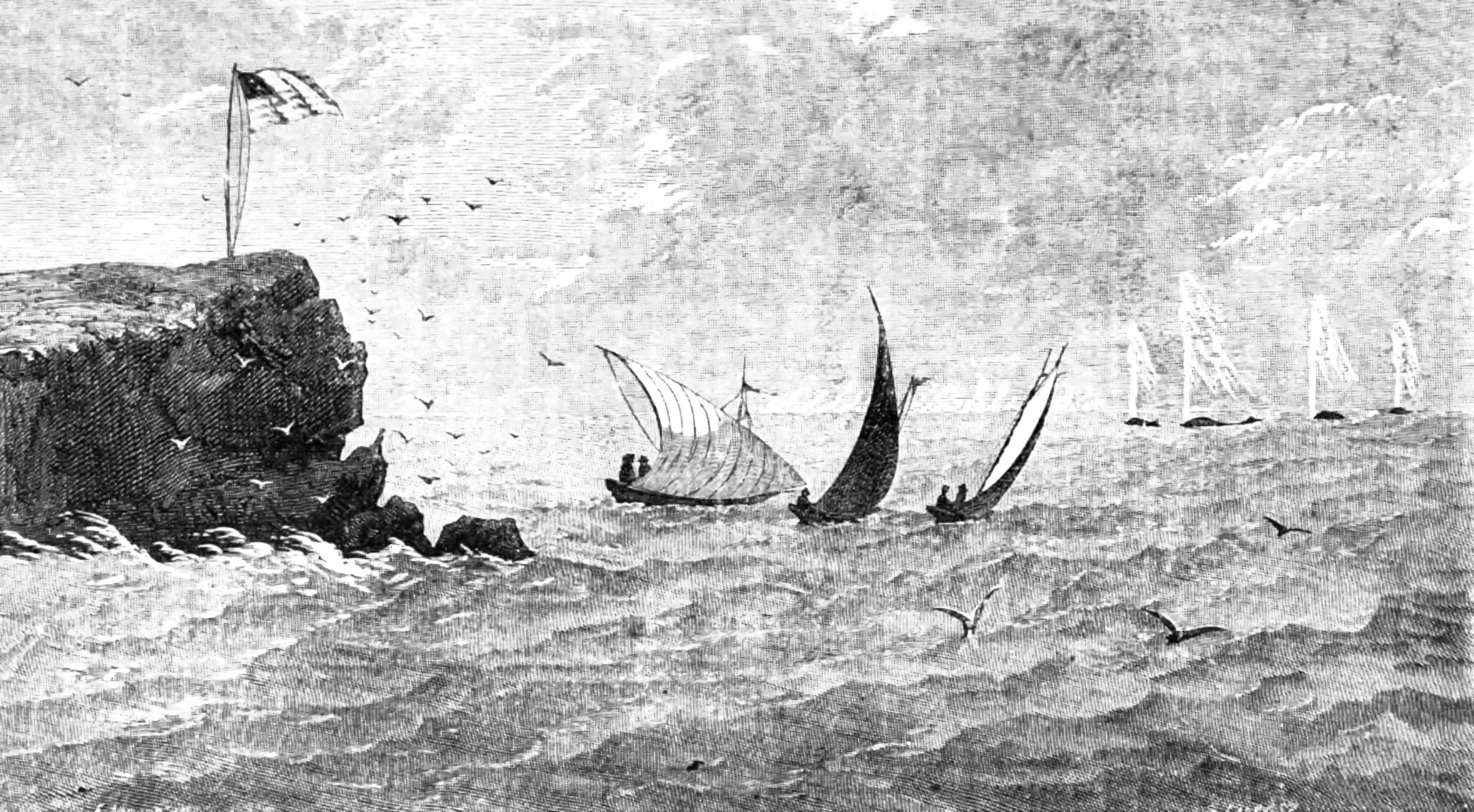
Pigeon Point, c. 1870s, prior to construction

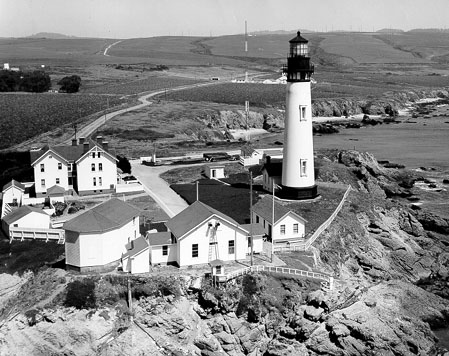
U.S. Coast Guard archive photo

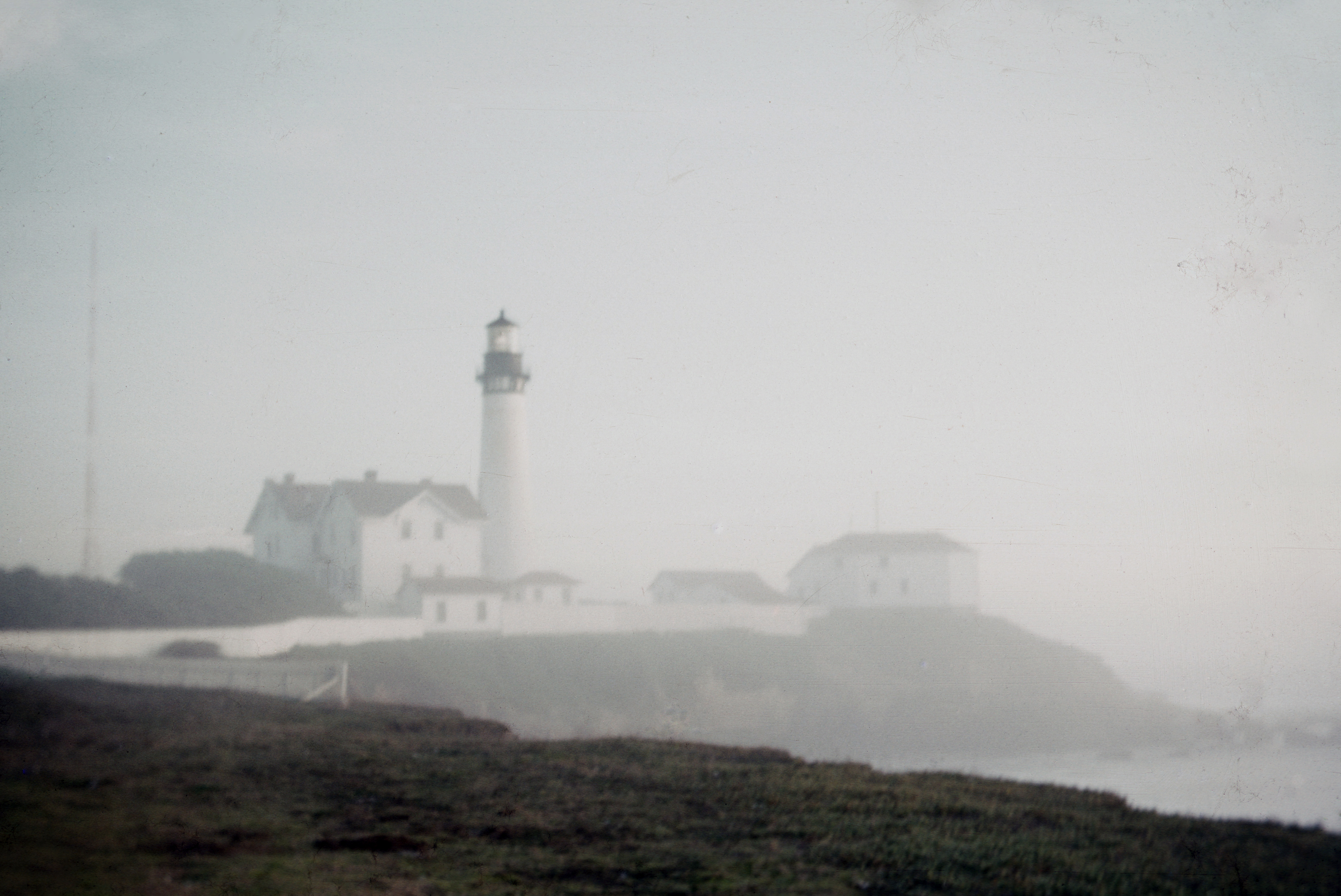
Taken circa 1950 when fully operational including the Fresnel lens and fog signal

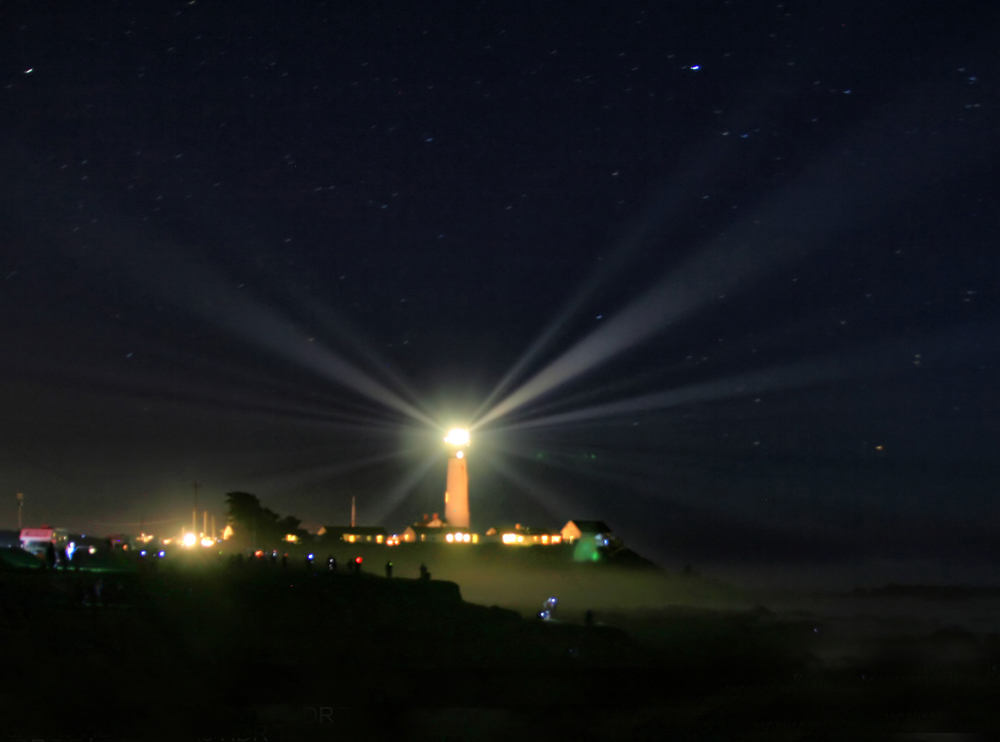
Pigeon Point Lighthouse with light on

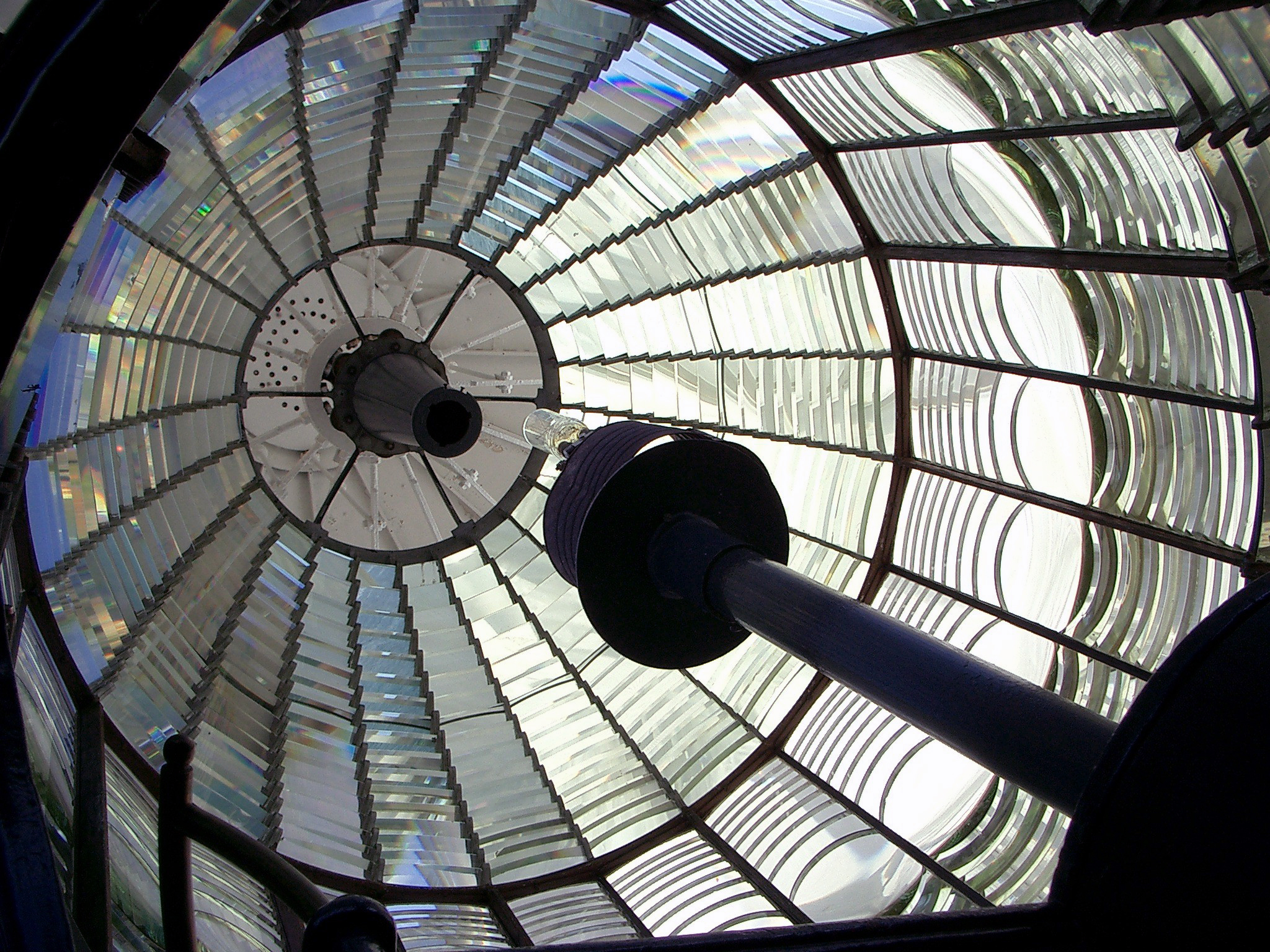
Pigeon Point Light Station: Inside View of the Fresnel Lens

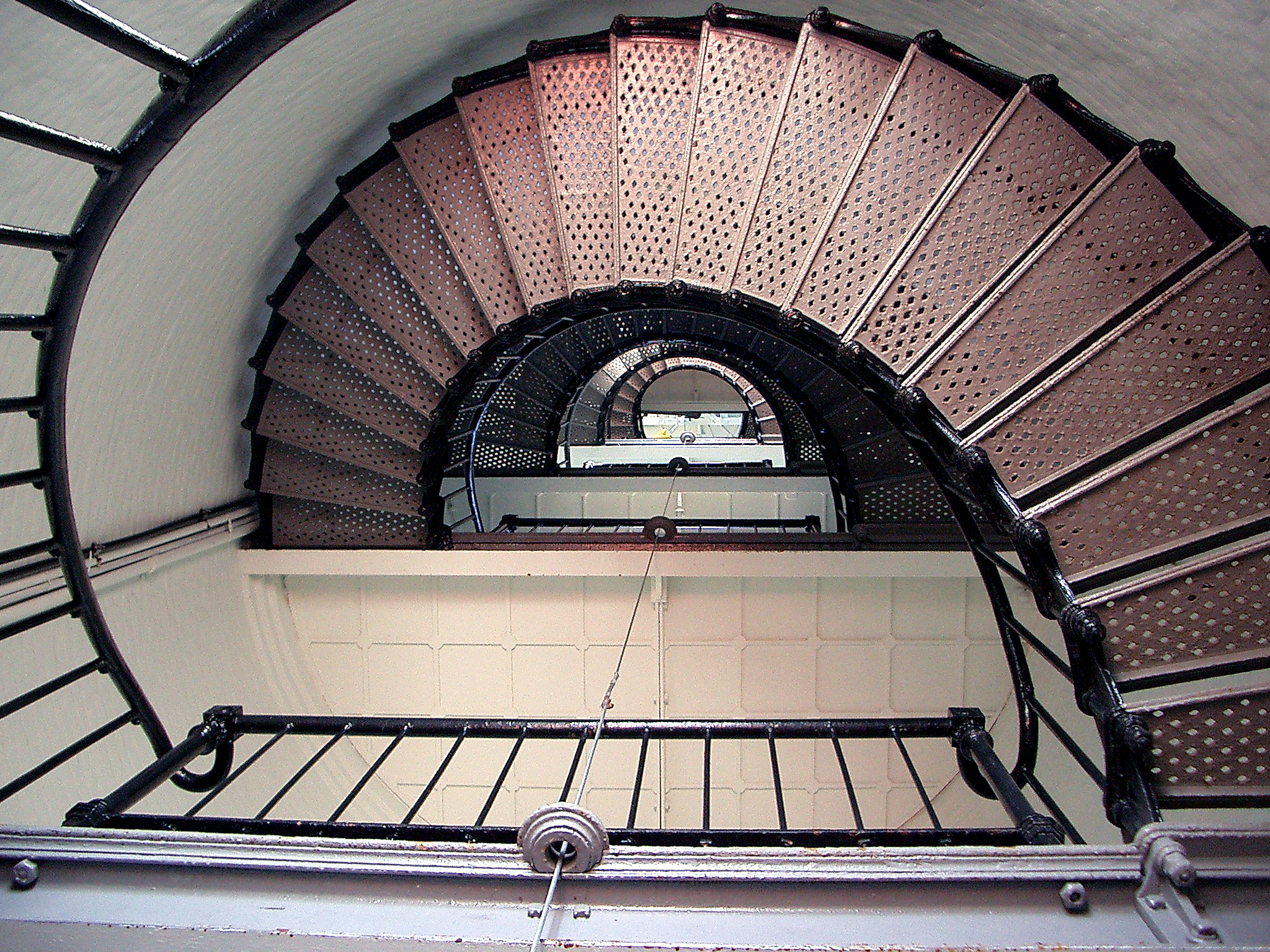
Pigeon Point Light Station Stairs in the Tower

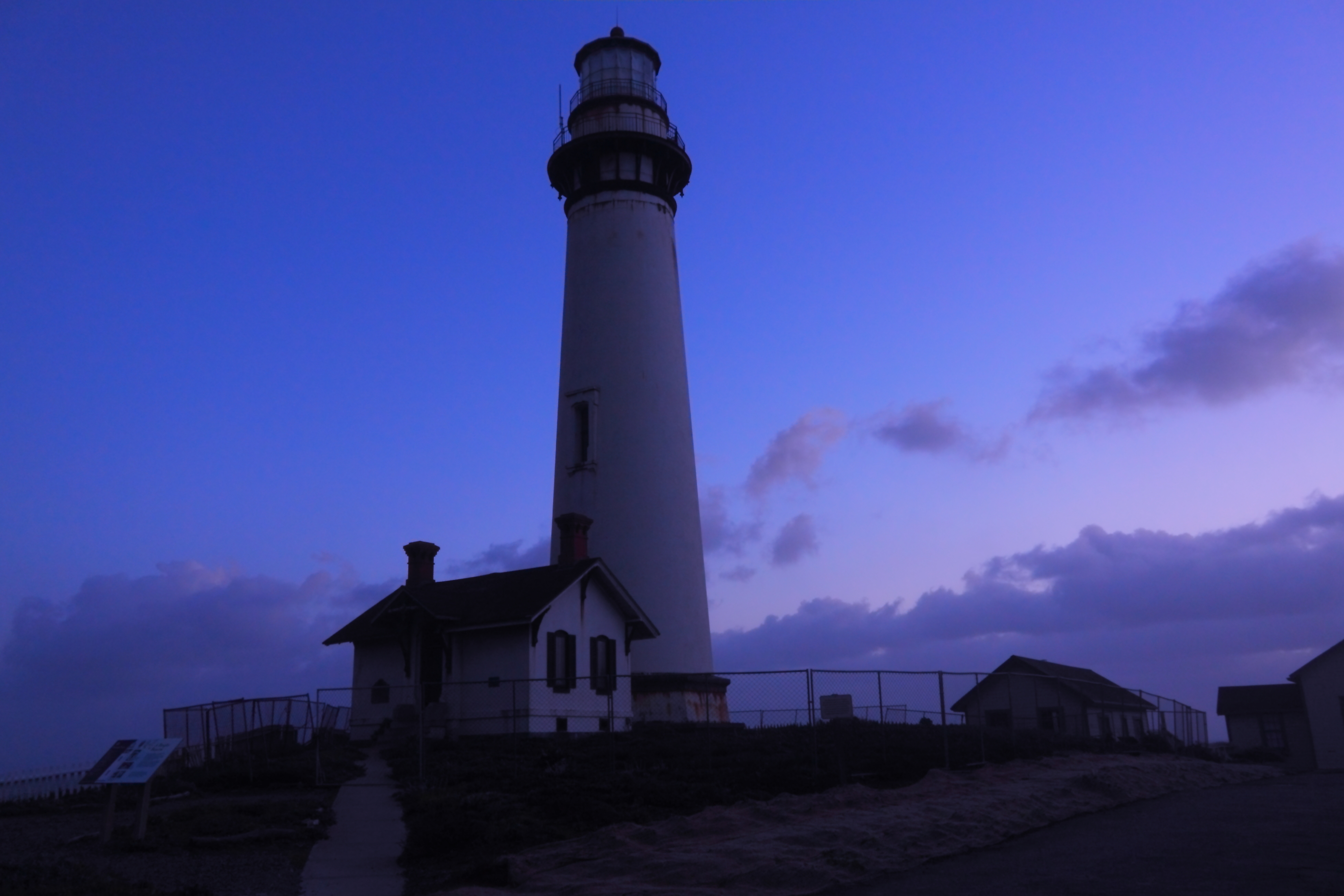
Pigeon Point Lighthouse at blue hour

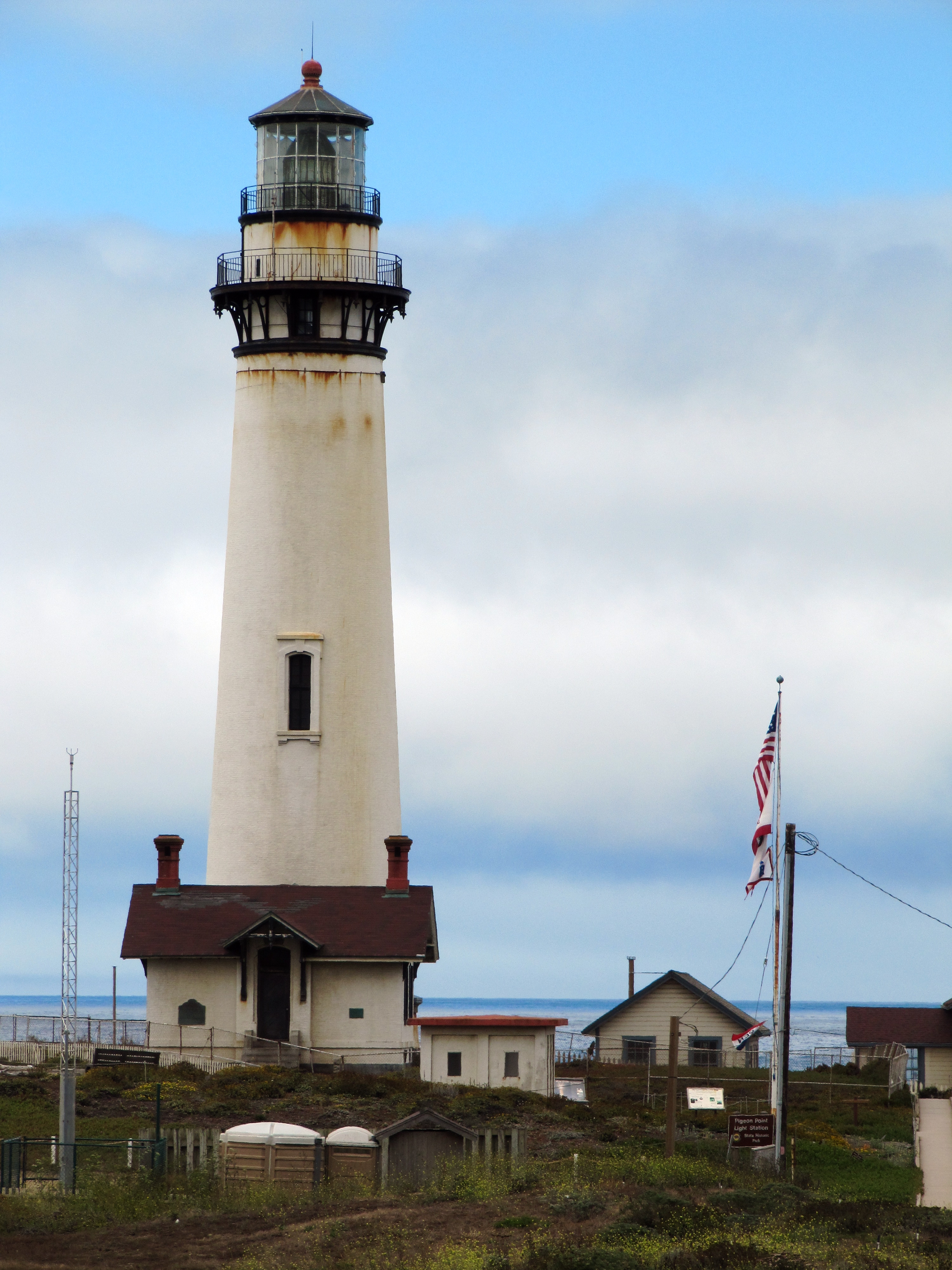
On pacific coast in summer

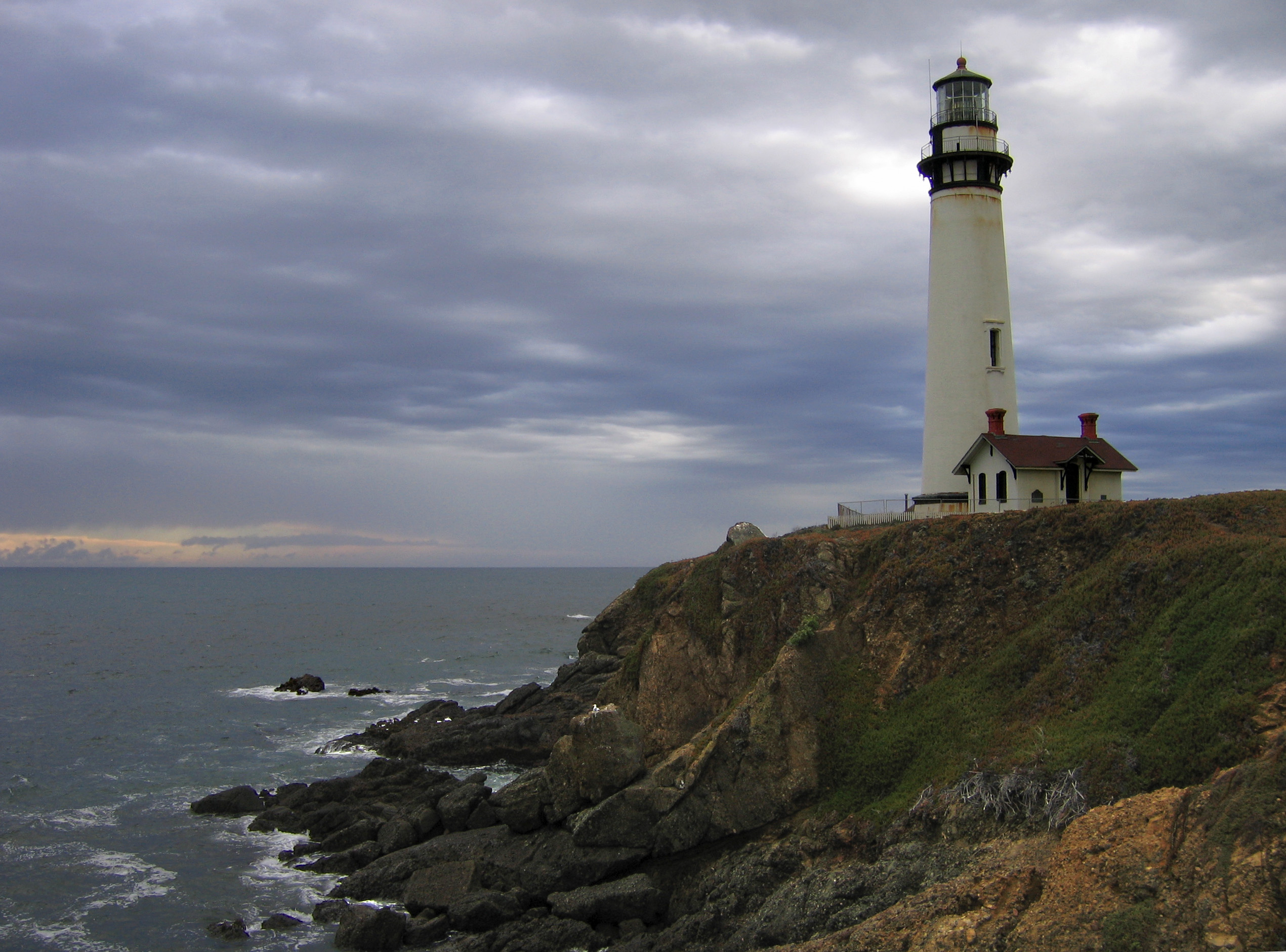
View of the lighthouse and surrounding rocks

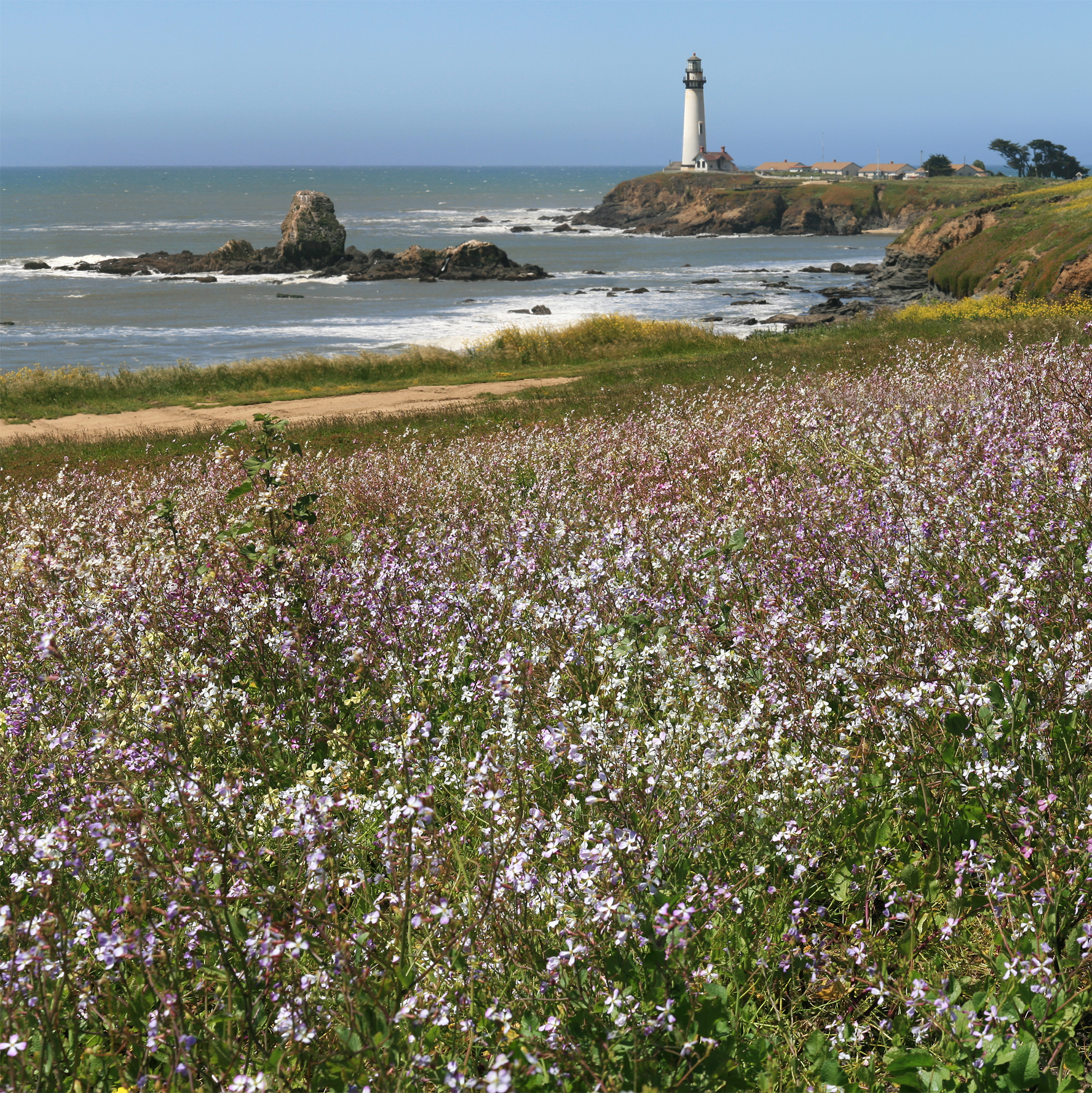
Pigeon Point Lighthouse with wildflowers (view from the South)

== See also ==
- List of lighthouses in California
- List of lighthouses in the United States
