= Pescadero, California =

Pescadero
- Census-designated place
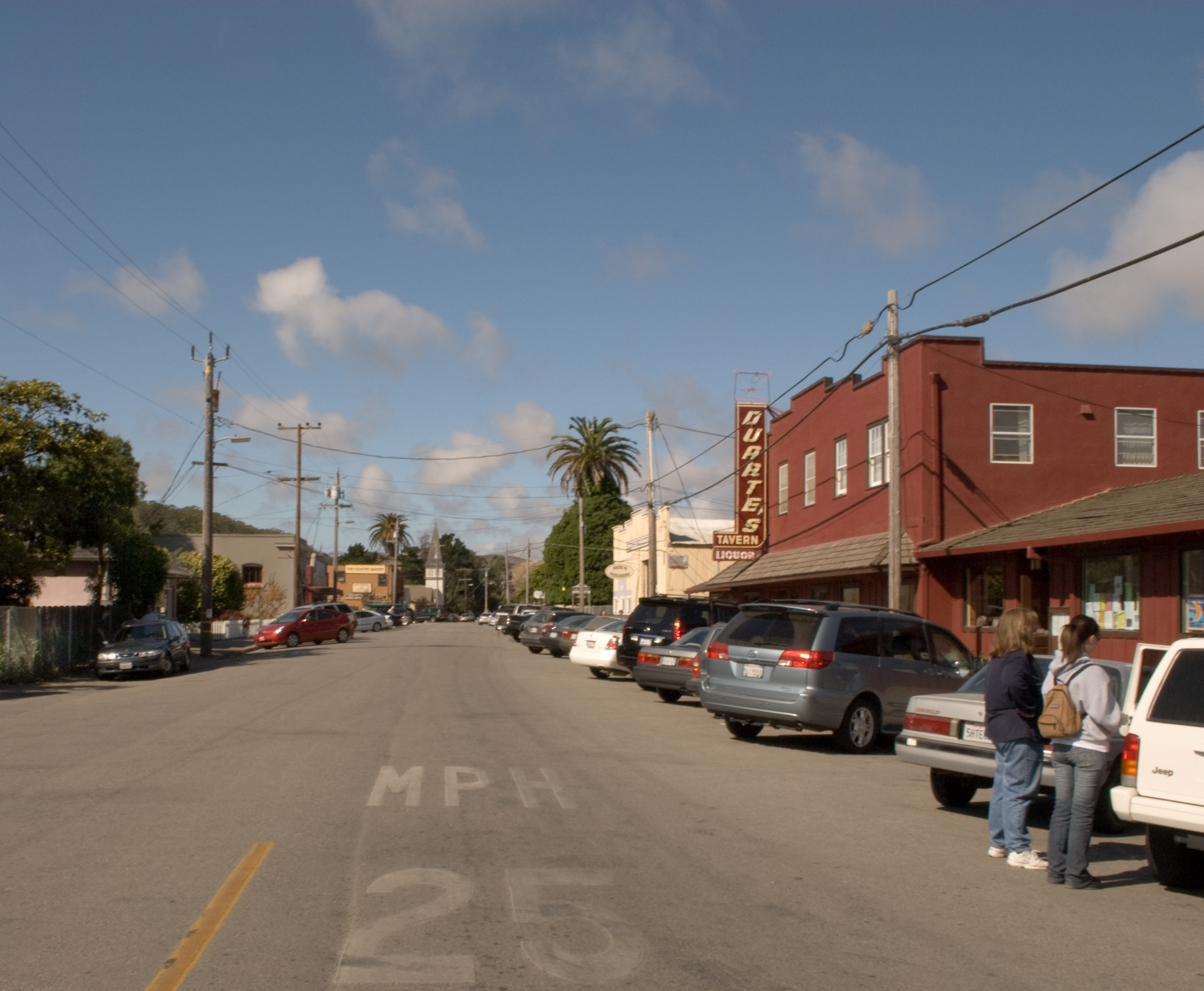
- Downtown Pescadero, looking north on Stage Road

- Location within San Mateo County

- Location within the state of California Pescadero (the United States)
- Coordinates: 37°15′18″N 122°22′53″W
- Country: United States
- State: California
- County: San Mateo

Area
  - Total: 4.034 sq mi (10.449 km^{2})
  - Land: 4.026 sq mi (10.426 km^{2})
  - Water: 0.0085 sq mi (0.022 km^{2}) 0.21%

Population (2020)
  - Total: 595
  - Density: 148/sq mi (57.1/km^{2})
- Time zone: UTC-8 (Pacific (PST))
  - Summer (DST): UTC-7 (PDT)
- ZIP codes: 94060
- Area code: 650

Pescadero (Spanish for "Fishmonger") is an unincorporated town and census-designated place (CDP) in San Mateo County, California, United States, two miles (3 km) east of State Route 1 and Pescadero State Beach. The town is 14.4 miles (23.2 km) south of Half Moon Bay. The ZIP Code is 94060 and the community is served by area code 650. The population was 595 at the 2020 census.

== About ==
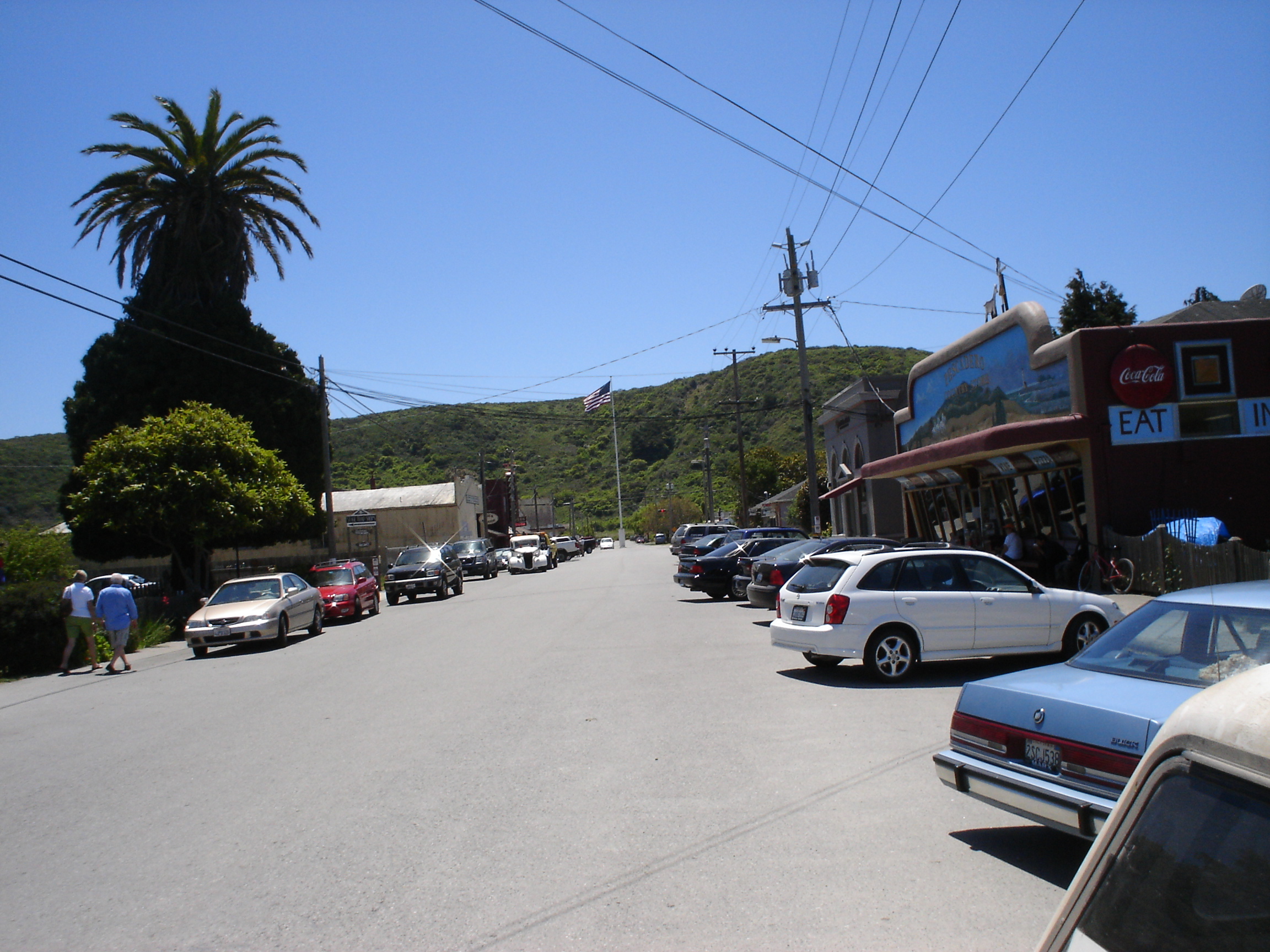
Downtown Pescadero on Stage Road, looking south, May 2008

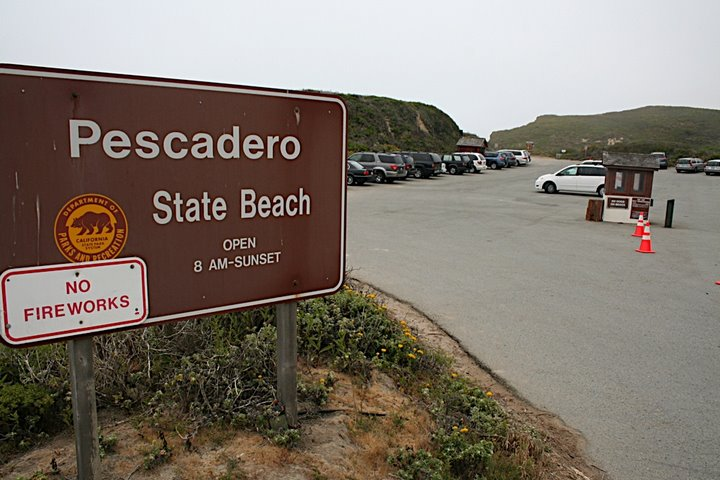
Pescadero State Beach is located on Highway 1, roughly two miles (3 km) west of town.

Pescadero is a farming, tourism, and ranching community near the Pescadero Marsh, a wildlife refuge. Pescadero Creek, the longest stream in San Mateo County, is an annual creek that empties into the Pacific Ocean near the town. Many of the buildings in town date from the 19th century. Pescadero is situated near the Pacific Ocean, about 17 miles (27 km) south of Half Moon Bay and about 34 miles (55 km) north of Santa Cruz.

Pescadero is also a weekend tourist destination during the summer months because of beaches, parks including Memorial Park and Butano State Park, Pigeon Point Lighthouse and Hostel, as well as extensive rural roads for biking and trails for hiking in the Santa Cruz Mountains. Pescadero is also host to a number of successful agricultural ventures, some of which offer high-quality produce and value-added products throughout San Mateo County and much of the Bay Area.

Pescadero hosts the annual Pescadero Art and Fun Fair (PAFF) on the third weekend of August. The Alto Velo Bicycle Racing Club holds the annual Pescadero Coastal Classic Road Race, which travels through the town and nearby countryside, in early- to mid-June.

The town is home to Pescadero Middle and High School, established in 1922. The Pescadero High School and Middle School teams are the Vikings and the Panthers, respectively. Pescadero Elementary School is located north of downtown.

Non-profits in Pescadero play a central role in much of the town's economy and the well-being of its residents. Puente de la Costa Sur serves as the only resource community center in this region of San Mateo County, providing valuable aid to farmworkers and community members alike. Educational organizations such as Pie Ranch work with the state to generate land access opportunities for impoverished communities, and stimulate regenerative agriculture initiatives.

KPDO, at 89.3 FM, is Pescadero's community radio station.

== Pescadero Marsh ==
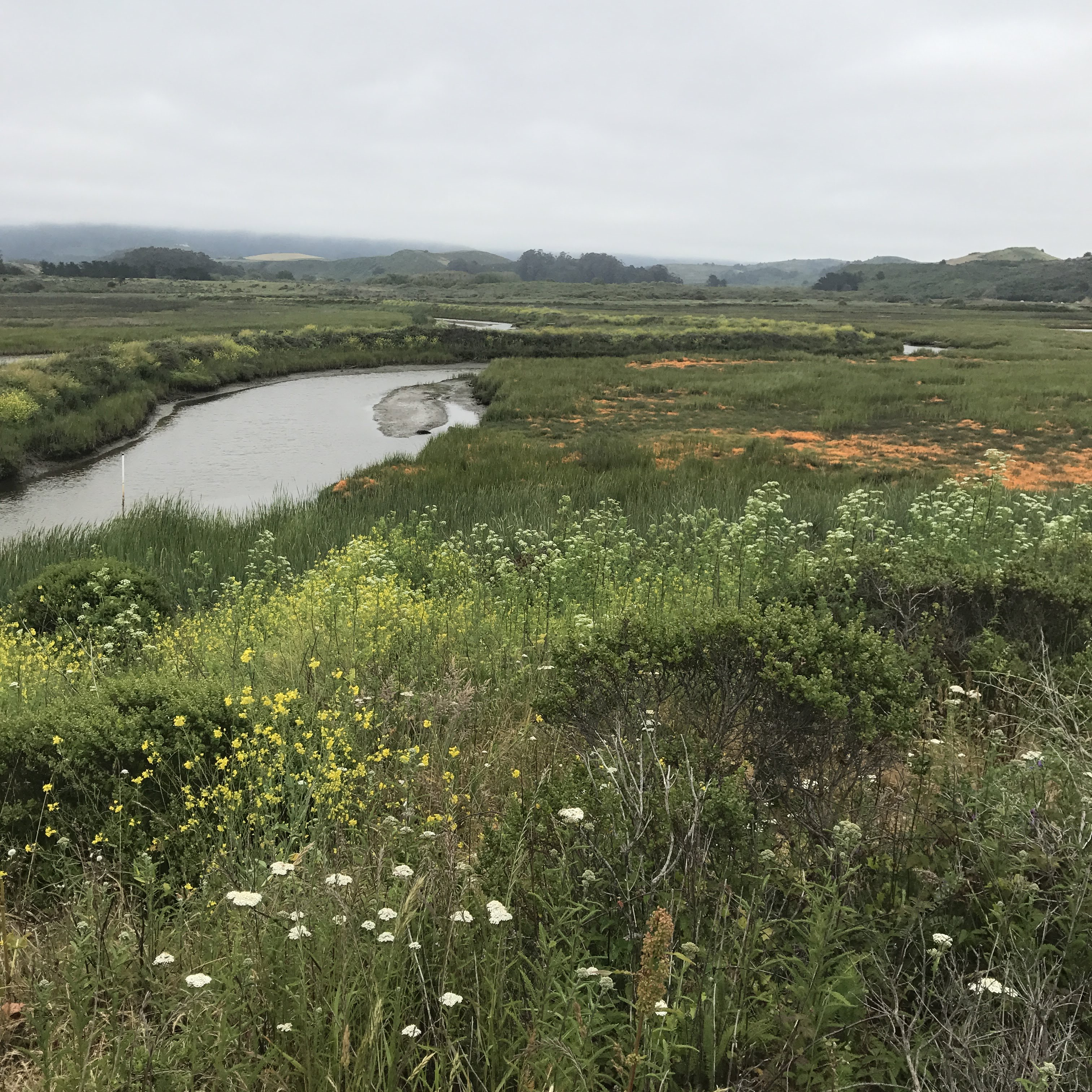
Pescadero Marsh (spring 2017)

Located at the confluence of Pescadero Creek and Butano Creek, the area known as Pescadero Marsh has for decades been a thriving habitat for both migratory and native wildlife. Besides being a refuge and nesting ground for wintering waterfowl, the Marsh is a critical spawning area and nursery for coho salmon, steelhead trout, tidewater goby, and many other threatened or endangered fish, amphibian, crustacean and reptile species.

Due to many causes, both natural and man-made, the health of Pescadero Marsh is deteriorating rapidly. Anoxic water conditions result in annual "die-offs" of hundreds of juvenile fish, crabs, and other species. As water levels fluctuate, many species are cut off from supportive habitat, and the entire eco-system degrades.

Since 1998, concerned citizens and other wildlife agencies have repeatedly asked California State Parks to take immediate corrective action. The state parks department has moved to request further studies. Meanwhile, native species populations in the marsh have reached critically low levels. According to a study by San Jose State University professor Jerry Smith, estimates in 1985 showed that 10,000 steelhead were rearing in the lagoon. As of 2008, 750 steelhead were counted in the same area.

== Attractions ==
=== Nature ===
- Butano State Park, hiking trails, and campsites
- Pescadero Creek
- Pescadero State Beach
- Pescadero Marsh
- Portolá Expedition Camp, a California Historical Landmark

=== Farms and dairies ===
- Harley Farms Goat Dairy
- Blue House Farm
- TomKat Ranch
- Simms Organic
- Fifth Crow Farm
- R & R Herbs
- Brisa Ranch

=== Buildings ===
- Dickerman Barn, a surviving dairy barn built for the Steele Brothers Dairy Ranches, located in the Año Nuevo State Park, and one of the National Register of Historic Places.
- First Congregational Church of Pescadero, a California Historical Landmark that is also on the National Register of Historic Places.
- Pigeon Point Lighthouse, located near Pescadero.

== Geography ==
According to the United States Census Bureau, the CDP covers an area of 4.0 square miles (10.4 km^{2}), 99.79% of it land and 0.21% of it water.

== Demographics ==
Historical population
Census	Pop.	Note	%±
2010	643		—
2020	595		−7.5%
U.S. Decennial Census; 1850–1870 1880-1890; 1900 1910 1920; 1930 1940 1950; 1960 1970 1980; 1990 2000 2010

Pescadero first appeared as a census designated place in the 2010 U.S. census.

The 2020 United States census reported that Pescadero had a population of 595. The population density was 147.8 inhabitants per square mile (57.1/km^{2}). The racial makeup of Pescadero was 345 (58.0%) White, 1 (0.2%) African American, 5 (0.8%) Native American, 9 (1.5%) Asian, 1 (0.2%) Pacific Islander, 160 (26.9%) from other races, and 74 (12.4%) from two or more races. Hispanic or Latino of any race were 356 persons (59.8%).

The census reported that 560 people (94.1% of the population) lived in households, 35 (5.9%) lived in non-institutionalized group quarters, and no one was institutionalized.

There were 189 households, out of which 69 (36.5%) had children under the age of 18 living in them, 86 (45.5%) were married-couple households, 14 (7.4%) were cohabiting couple households, 43 (22.8%) had a female householder with no partner present, and 46 (24.3%) had a male householder with no partner present. 53 households (28.0%) were one person, and 15 (7.9%) were one person aged 65 or older. The average household size was 2.96. There were 124 families (65.6% of all households).

The age distribution was 126 people (21.2%) under the age of 18, 65 people (10.9%) aged 18 to 24, 172 people (28.9%) aged 25 to 44, 165 people (27.7%) aged 45 to 64, and 67 people (11.3%) who were 65 years of age or older. The median age was 35.8 years. For every 100 females, there were 109.5 males.

There were 205 housing units at an average density of 50.9 units per square mile (19.7 units/km^{2}), of which 189 (92.2%) were occupied. Of these, 77 (40.7%) were owner-occupied, and 112 (59.3%) were occupied by renters.

== Weather ==
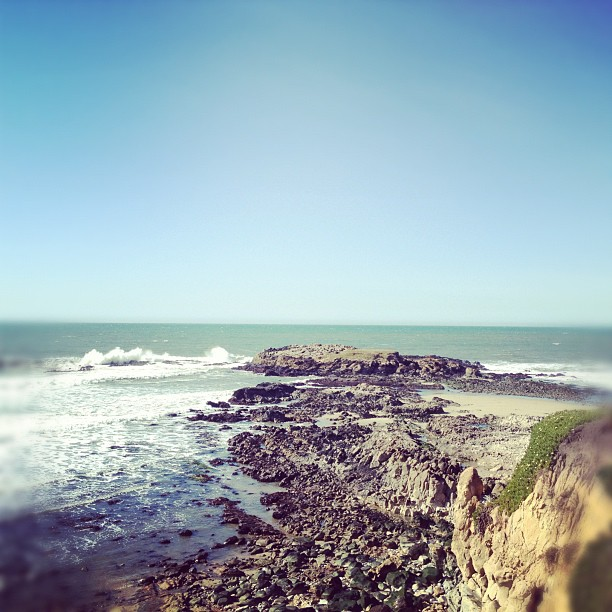
Pescadero State Beach (2012)

Pescadero has cool, wet winters and mild, mostly dry summers. Fog and low overcast are common throughout the year, particularly during the summer months. Strong winds sometimes blow off the nearby Pacific Ocean. December is the coolest month, with an average maximum of 59 °F (15 °C) and an average minimum of 39 °F (4 °C). August is the warmest month, with an average maximum of 75 °F (24 °C) and an average minimum of 51 °F (11 °C). Winter temperatures seldom drop below freezing, and summer temperatures rarely exceed 90 °F (32 °C). Due to its coastal location, temperatures in Pescadero are mild and fairly consistent throughout the year.

Average annual precipitation is 29.52 inches (750 mm), mostly falling as rain since snow is extremely rare on the coast.

The nearest National Weather Service cooperative weather station is in the nearby village of San Gregorio, north of Pescadero on Stage Road.

Climate data for Pescadero, California
Month	Jan	Feb	Mar	Apr	May	Jun	Jul	Aug	Sep	Oct	Nov	Dec	Year
Mean daily maximum °F (°C)	59.6 (15.3)	61.3 (16.3)	63.0 (17.2)	65.3 (18.5)	68.0 (20.0)	71.5 (21.9)	74.3 (23.5)	74.8 (23.8)	74.6 (23.7)	71.1 (21.7)	64.2 (17.9)	59.3 (15.2)	67.3 (19.6)
Mean daily minimum °F (°C)	39.2 (4.0)	40.6 (4.8)	41.4 (5.2)	42.4 (5.8)	45.9 (7.7)	48.3 (9.1)	50.9 (10.5)	51.2 (10.7)	49.1 (9.5)	45.6 (7.6)	41.5 (5.3)	38.9 (3.8)	44.6 (7.0)
Average precipitation inches (mm)	6.04 (153)	5.93 (151)	5.23 (133)	1.99 (51)	0.82 (21)	0.24 (6.1)	0.12 (3.0)	0.15 (3.8)	0.39 (9.9)	1.62 (41)	3.98 (101)	4.44 (113)	30.95 (786)

== History ==
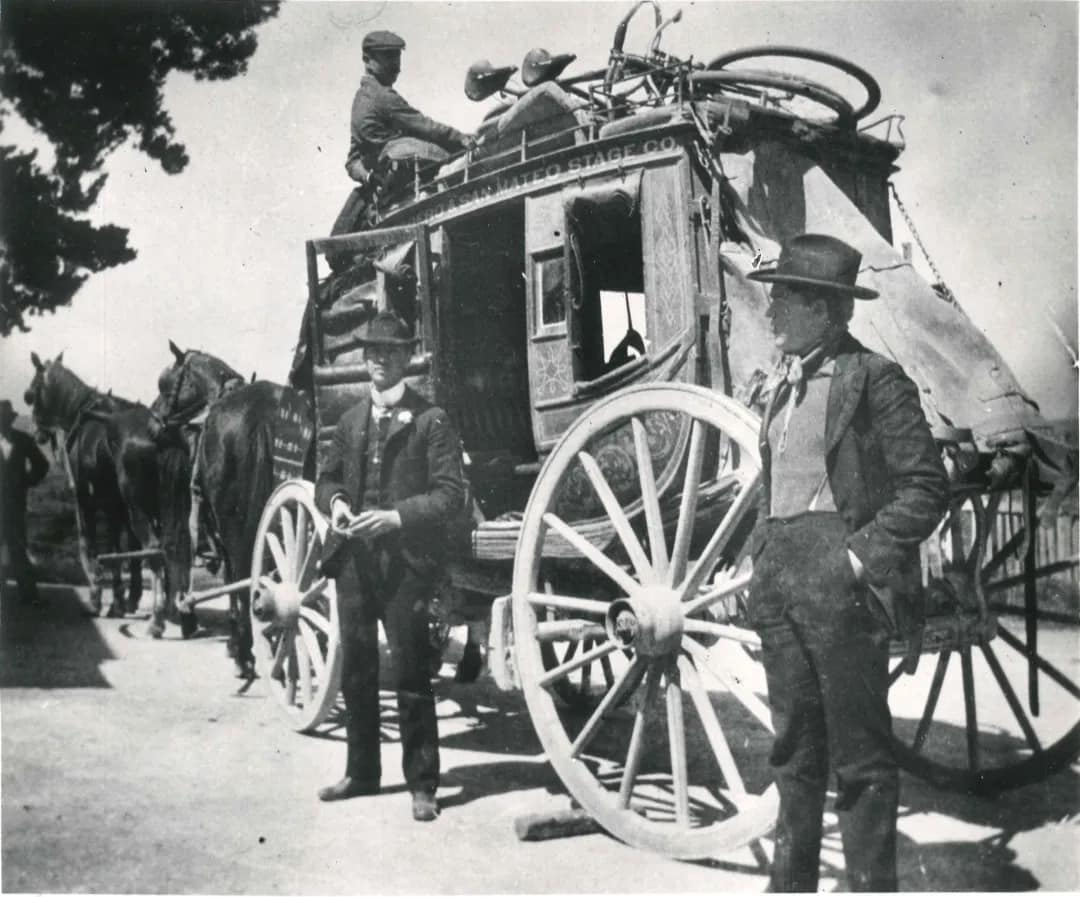
Stagecoach between San Mateo and Pescadero, c. 1890

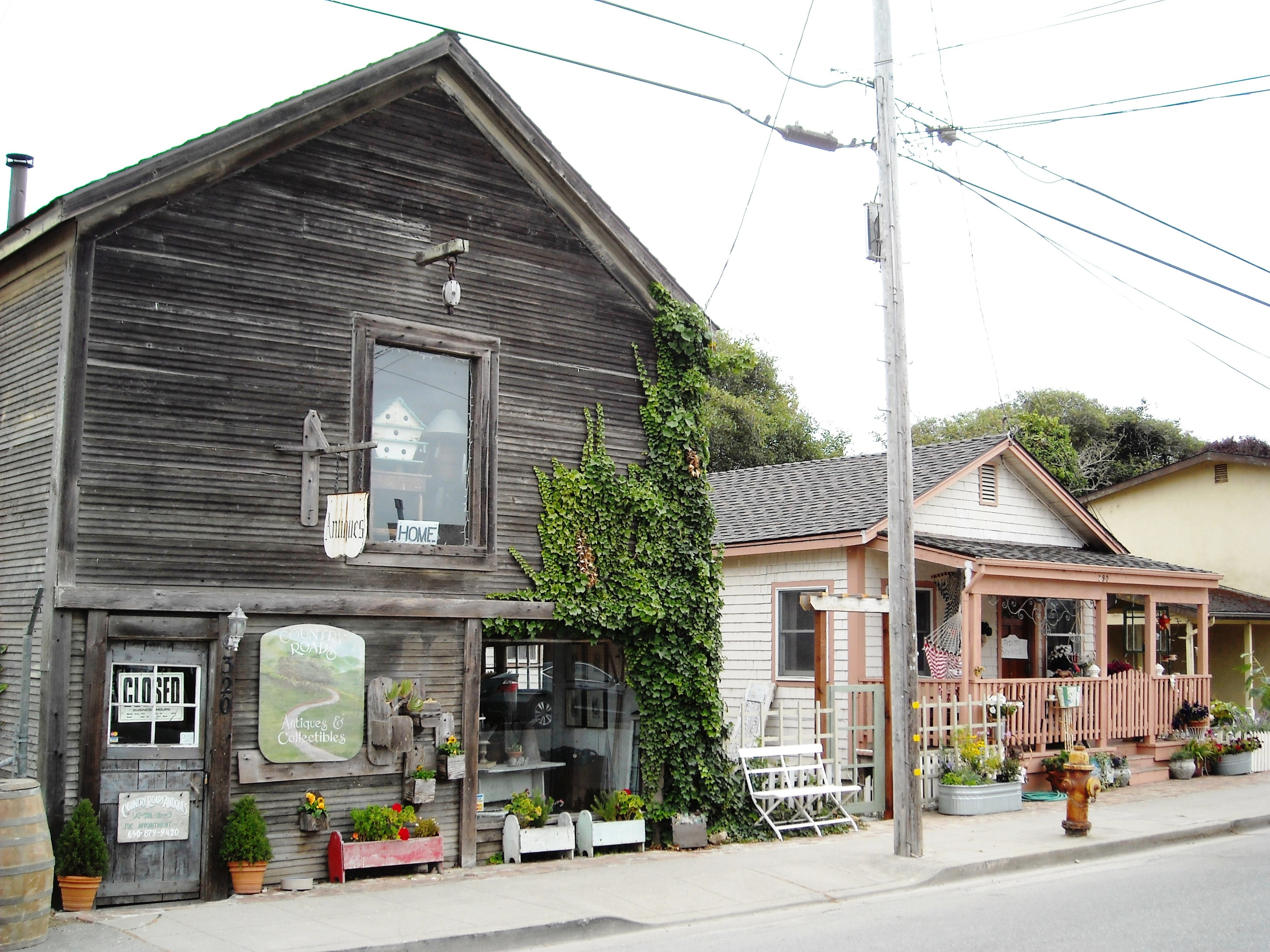
Old Town, Pescadero, California

The town of Pescadero is located on the Rancho Pescadero Mexican land grant; former Mission Santa Cruz pasture given to Juan José Gonzalez in 1833. Alexander Moore (1823–1902), an American pioneer, built his home in Pescadero Valley in 1853. The rich, fertile soil of the valley had attracted other settlers, and in the 1860s Pescadero was a prosperous town surrounded by farms and lumber mills.

According to a guidebook published by the California Coastal Commission, the residents of Pescadero recovered a large quantity of white paint from the 1853 wreck of the clipper ship Carrier Pigeon at Pigeon Point. The paint was "used liberally on all the town's buildings", and residents have since maintained the tradition of painting their houses white. However, other sources credit the 1896 wreck of the steamer Columbia as the source of the white paint.

An article in the Wells Fargo Messenger states that a stagecoach salvaged from the Carrier Pigeon was laboriously hoisted up the cliffs onto the road, and put into service within a week. The coach, built in Concord, New Hampshire, carried passengers and freight on the Pescadero road for the Wells Fargo Company for forty years, and in 1914, was listed among the company's prized possessions.

Another tale relates that an Irishman named John Daly, who was employed driving pigs from Santa Cruz to Alexander Moore's Pescadero ranch, discovered some lumps of coal from the steamer Sea Bird's cargo on the beach at Ano Nuevo. Mr. Daly endeavored to parley his discovery into money which he might spend on whiskey. Since coal deposits had been rumored to exist in the area, Mr. Daly proceeded with his lumps of coal to Santa Cruz, announcing to Captain Brannan and three others that he had discovered a coal mine at Gazos Creek. After collecting his monetary reward, he led the four men up Gazos Creek in search of the alleged coal outcropping, with the intention of escaping and leaving his benefactors behind empty-handed. However, Captain Brannan, who was armed, managed to capture Daly and extracted a confession. Daly was administered a whipping on the spot and later fled the area.

== Notable people ==
- Steve Blank (born 1953), entrepreneur and academician
- Jessica Dubroff (1988–1996), 7-year-old pilot trainee who was killed in a plane crash
- Dee Hock (1929–2022), founder and CEO of the Visa credit card association.
- Gordon Moore (1929–2023), cofounder and chairman emeritus of Intel Corporation, and the author of Moore's law, grew up in Pescadero and resided there until he was about 10 years of age. His childhood home still stands as does the barn he played in (Pescadero Creekside Barn).
- Heinz von Foerster (1911–2002), scientist and cybernetician lived on an estate in the Pescadero hills called "Rattlesnake Hill" until his death in 2002.

== See also ==
- Carrier Pigeon, clipper ship that wrecked near the town in 1853
