= Gazos Creek =

Stream in San Mateo County, California, U.S.

Coordinates: 37°09′53″N 122°21′46″W

Gazos Creek is a stream in San Mateo County, California, in the United States.

Gazos was likely derived from the Spanish word garzas meaning "herons".

== See also ==
- List of rivers of California
