= Año Nuevo =

Año Nuevo means New Year in Spanish, and refers to New Year's Eve in Latin American countries.

== Places ==
- Año Nuevo Island, a small island off the coast of Northern California, between San Francisco and Santa Cruz
- Año Nuevo State Marine Conservation Area, a marine protected area off California's central coast
- Año Nuevo State Park, a California wildlife reserve located in San Mateo County
- Rancho Punta del Año Nuevo, a Mexican land grant in present-day San Mateo County, California
