= Rancho Pescadero =

Rancho Pescadero may refer to these Mexican land grants in California:

- Rancho Pescadero (Barreto) or Punta del Cipreses, 1836, in Monterey County
- Rancho Pescadero (Gonzalez) or Rancho San Antonio, 1833, in San Mateo County
- Rancho Pescadero (Grimes), 1843, in Stanislaus and San Joaquin Counties
- Rancho Pescadero (Pico), 1843, in San Joaquin and Alameda Counties
