= Steele Brothers Dairy Ranches =

Historical place in San Mateo County, United States

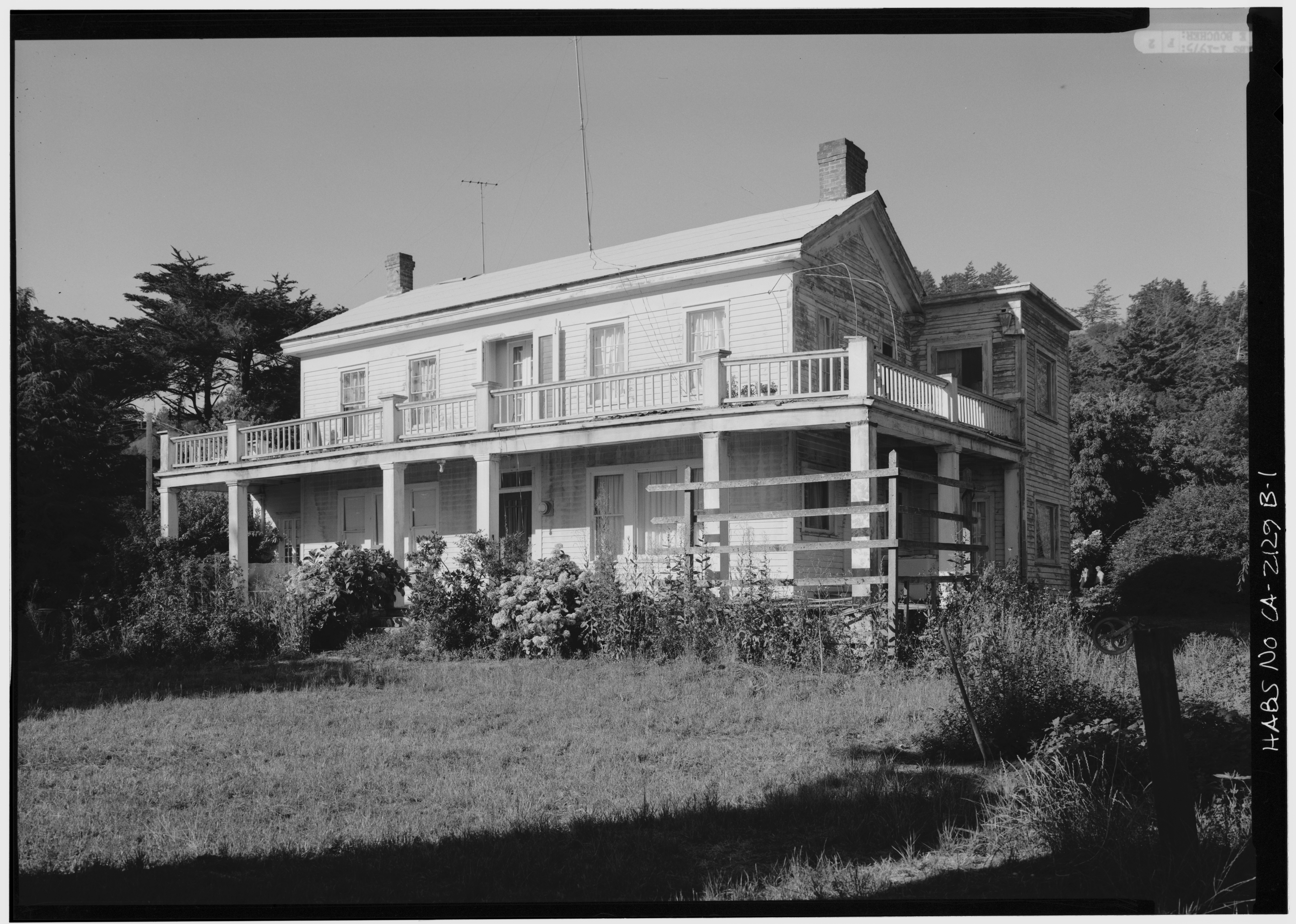
- Steele Brothers Dairy Ranches, Cascade Ranch House

- Location within California Location within the United States
- 37.119°N 122.307°W
- Location: Año Nuevo State Park, Pescadero, California

History
- Built: 1850

Site notes
- Architects: Steele brothers: Edgar W. Steele; Isaac C. Steele; Rensselaer E. Steele
- Architectural style: Dairy farm

California Historical Landmark
- Designated: February 8, 1977
- Reference no.: 906

Steele Brothers Dairy Ranches is a historical site in Pescadero, California in San Joaquin County. Steele Brothers Dairy Ranches site is a California Historical Landmark No. 906 listed on February 8, 1977. The Steele Brothers: Edgar W. Steele, Isaac C. Steele, and Rensselaer E. Steele, were the pioneers of larger scale Dairy farming. Steele Brothers from New York and Ohio, had large-scale commercial cheese and dairy plants. Steele Brothers operated 7,000-acre ranch with five dairies. The ranch ran from Gazos Creek on the north to Point Año Nuevo on the south, about 5 miles on the along the Coastal California, between the Pacific Ocean and Big Basin Redwoods. The five dairies were has far north as Point Reyes and as south as the one at Gazos Creek near Rancho Punta del Año Nuevo. The Steele Brothers operated from 1850 to 1950.

A historical marker was placed in 1982 by the California State Department of Parks and Recreation working with the Año Nuevo Interpretive Association. The marker is on Cabrillo Highway at New Year's Creek Road. The Old Steele Dairy Barn is now the Marine Education Center at Año Nuevo State Park.

== See also ==
- California Historical Landmarks in San Mateo County
- Rancho Santa Ysabel (Arce)
- Dairy industry in the United States
- Rancho Punta del Año Nuevo
- Rancho Butano
