= Rancho Butano =

Mexican land grant in California

Coordinates: 37.240°N 122.390°W

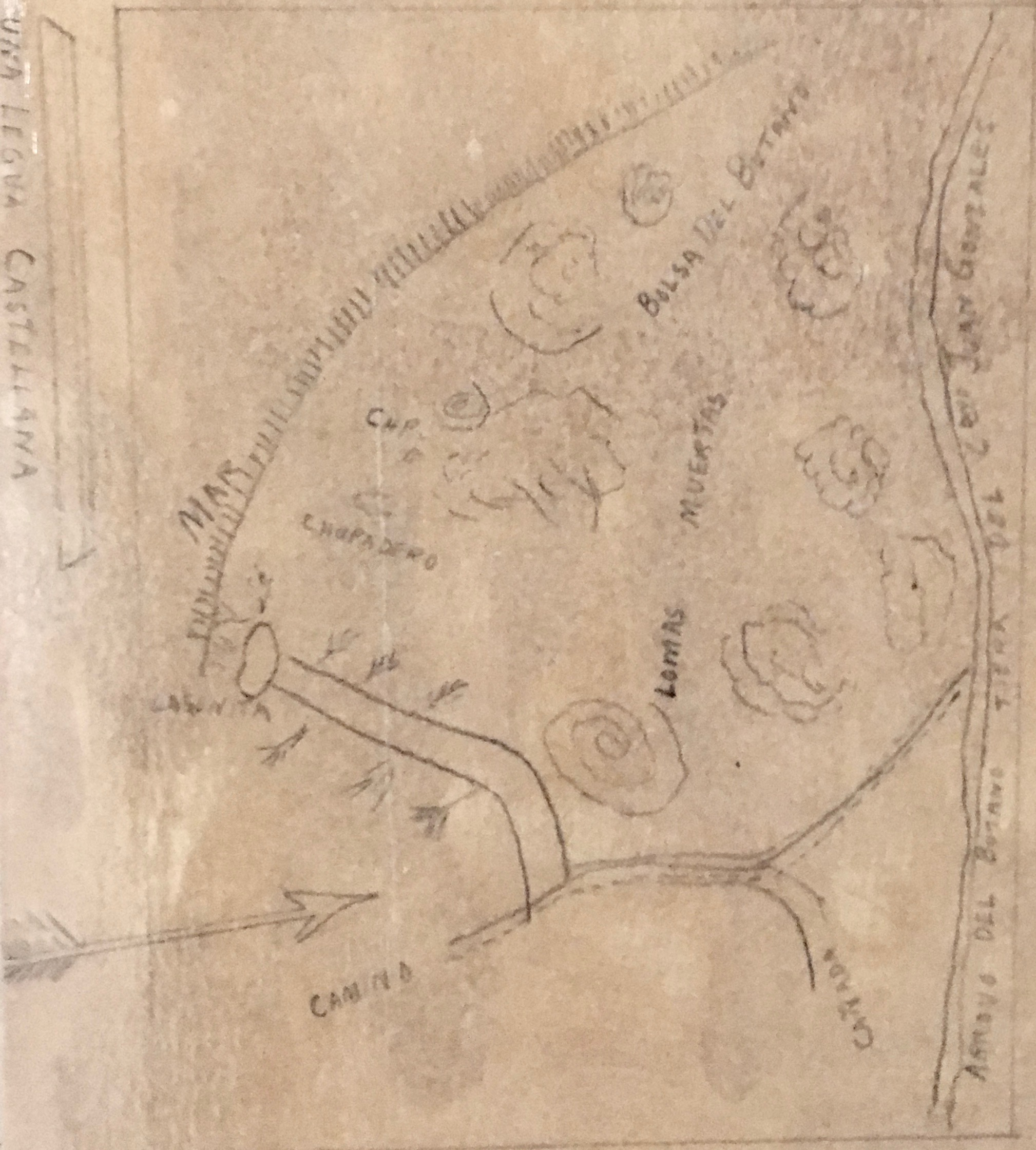
To obtain a land grant during the Mexican period, the applicant accompanied the petition with a topographical sketch or diseño. Mexican law did not require precision surveying.

Rancho Butano was a 4,439-acre (17.96 km^{2}) Mexican land grant in present-day San Mateo County, California, given in 1838 by Governor Juan Alvarado and confirmed in 1844 by Governor Manuel Micheltorena to Ramona Sanchez. The name Butano can be traced back to 1816. It speculated that Californios called a drinking cup made from the horn of a bull or other animal a butano. A First American origin is possible but has not been established. At one time, the grant was in Santa Cruz County 1850–1868; a boundary adjustment transferred the land to San Mateo County. The grant extended along the Pacific coast between Rancho Pescadero and Rancho Punta del Año Nuevo, with Butano Creek on the north to Arroyo de los Frijoles (Creek of the Beans) on the south, and encompassed present-day Bean Hollow State Beach and Butano State Park.

== History ==
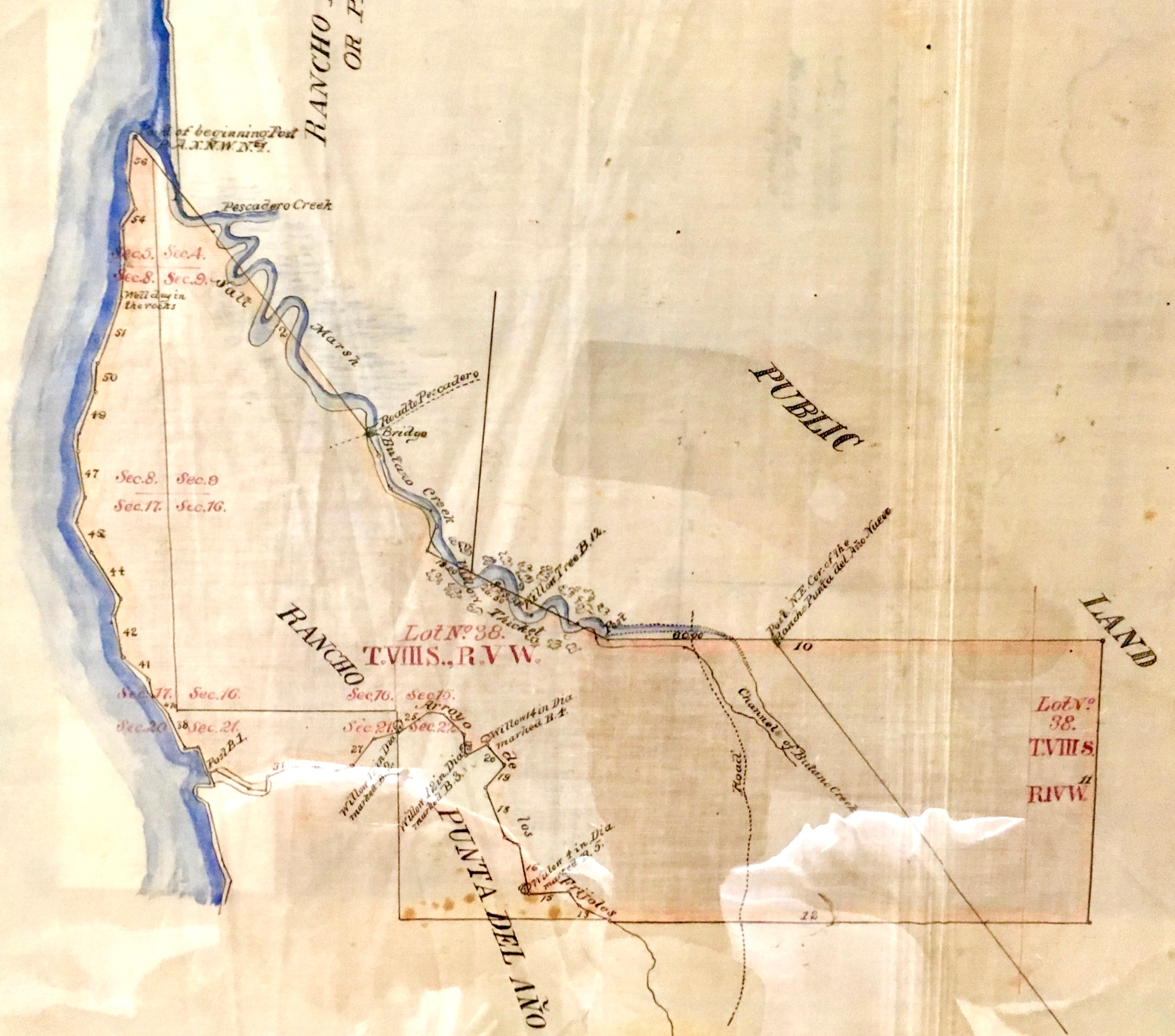
Grant patented to Manuel Rodríguez

Under Mexican rule, substantial changes in California society began, including the dismantling of the mission properties and expansion of colonists into California's former mission landholdings. Settlers petitioned for land grants, and between the years of 1834 and 1836 alone the Mexican Congress released million acres of mission lands to private ownership. Without the authority of the missions, the Indians lost any potential claim to their lands. The Former Mission cattle ranches at Pescadero and Año Nuevo were ultimately divided into three separate Mexican Period land grants deeded to Mexican citizens. These new land divisions included Rancho San Antonio- or Pescadero, Rancho Punta del Año Nuevo, and Rancho Butano.

Juan Venancio Galindo married María Ramona Lorenza Sanchez in 1795. Their son, José Antonio Galindo, was granted the Rancho Laguna de la Merced and Rancho Saucelito in 1835. The one square league Butano Rancho was granted to Ramona Sanchez, widow of Venancio Galindo, in 1838, this was the first grant issued by Governor Juan Alvarado, and re-granted to the same grantee, by Governor Manuel Micheltorena in 1844. In 1852, Ramona Sanchez sold the Rancho Butano to Manuel Rodriguez.

With the cession of California to the United States following the Mexican-American War, the 1848 Treaty of Guadalupe Hidalgo provided that the land grants would be honored. As required by the Land Act of 1851, a claim for Rancho Butano was filed with the Public Land Commission in 1853. Rodríguez won a dispute about the northern boundary with Rancho Pescadero in 1863, and the grant was patented to Manuel Rodríguez in 1866.

Rancho Butano was sold in 1862 to Clark & Coburn of San Francisco. Loren Coburn, born in Vermont, came to California in 1851, and worked first in mining. Loren Coburn bought out his brother-in-law Jeremiah Clark. Coburn subsequently bought Rancho Punta del Año Nuevo directly to the south. He was an extremely aggressive land owner, contesting boundaries, and a perpetual litigant in the courts, and was widely disliked. In the 1890s, Coburn erected a large hotel on the bluff above Pebble Beach, hoping to make it a popular destination for vacationers taking the planned Ocean Shore Railroad from San Francisco. Pescadero Marsh remained an un-important feature to Mr. Coburn, and at that time there were no formal roads through it, although cattle grazed freely throughout the marsh as it remained unfenced.

The San Francisco earthquake in 1906 ended construction on the railroad, and the hotel permanently closed. Coburn leased much of the land to a dairy enterprise run by the Steele family (Rensselaer, Isaac and Edgar) from Delaware. Coburn and Clark's legacy of defending their land slowed the subdivision and development of Rancho Butano. Ultimately, Loren Coburn died on November 14, 1918, at the age of ninety-two. By 1920, Coburn's landholdings near Pescadero were subdivided into small farms by the Peninsula Farms Company, which had acquired property rights from one of Coburn's Trustees, Mr. Christopher Wideman (Morrall 1992:214). Similarly, Butano Farms became an agricultural pursuit.
