= Año Nuevo Island =

Island in the United States of America

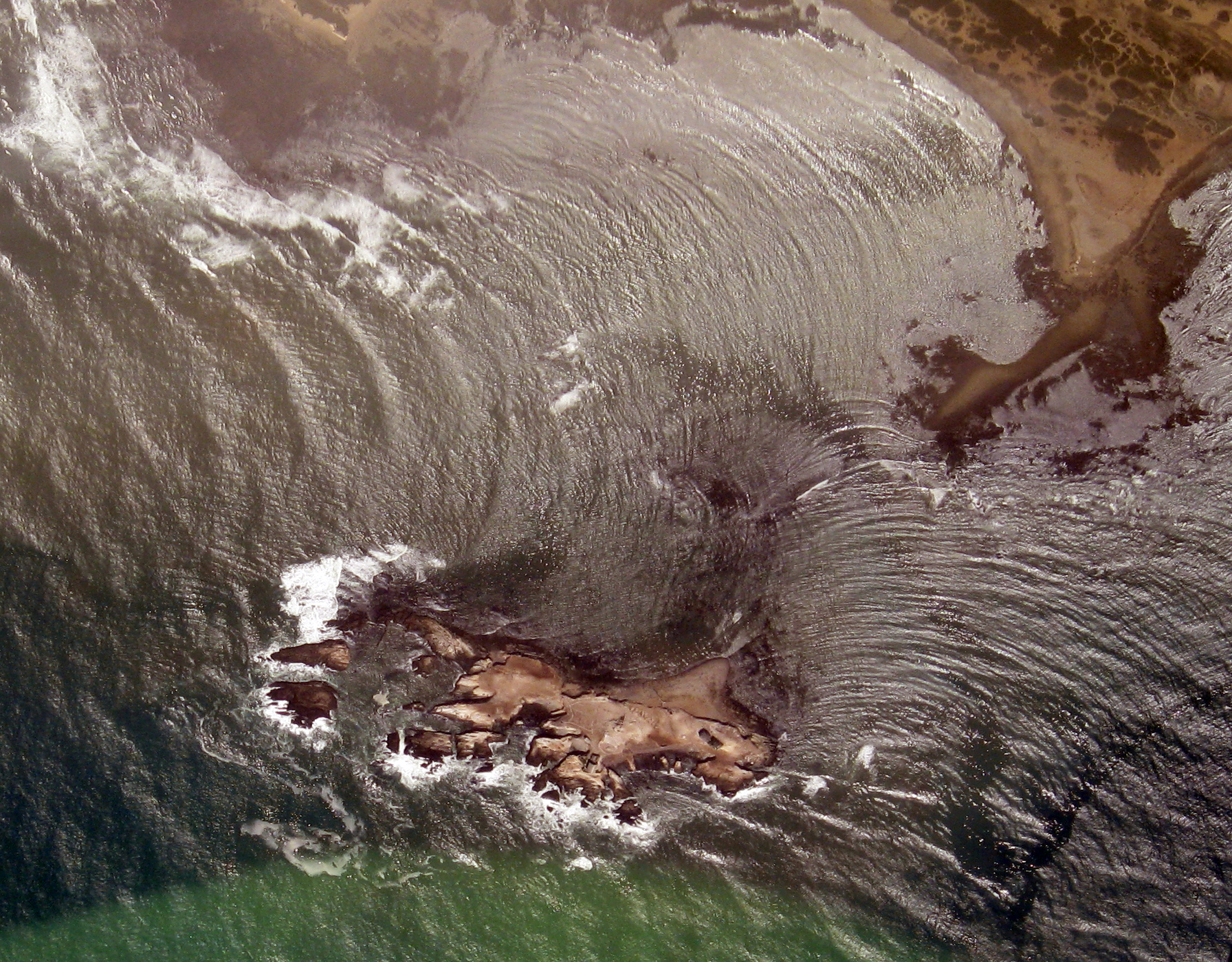
- Aerial view of Año Nuevo Island, 2009

- Location within California Location within the United States

Geography
- Coordinates: 37.1083°N 122.3378°W
- Total islands: 1
- Area: 0.0364217 km^{2} (0.0140625 sq mi)

Administration
- United States
- State: California
- Governing body: California Department of Parks and Recreation University of California Natural Reserve System

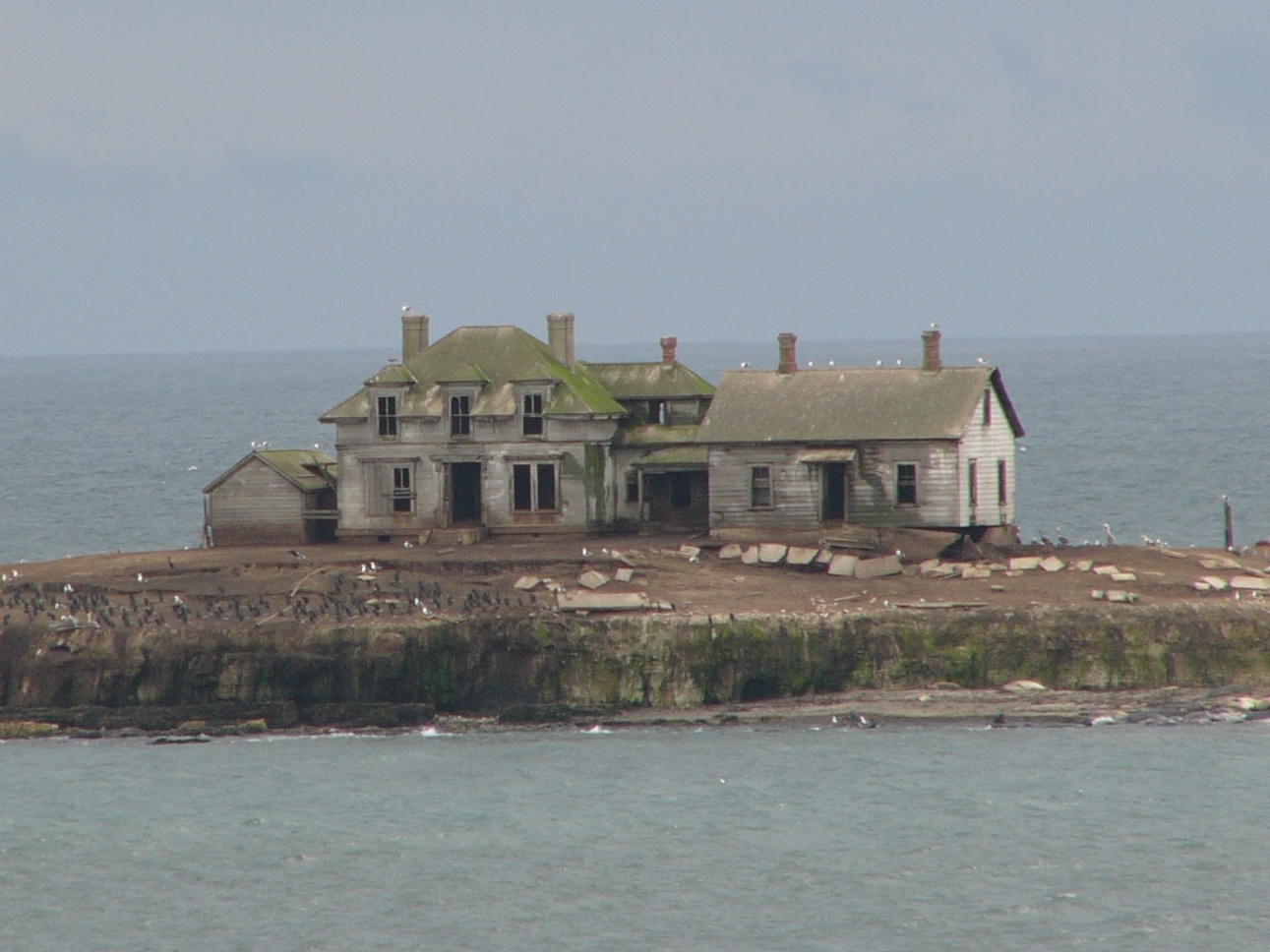
Abandoned buildings on Año Nuevo Island, photographed in 2005.

Año Nuevo Island (Año Nuevo, Spanish for "New Year") is a small island off Año Nuevo Point on the coast of Northern California, between San Francisco and Santa Cruz. The island has an area of 9 acres (3.6 ha). It is an important breeding site for northern elephant seals and the endangered Steller's sea lion, as well as several species of seabirds, including rhinoceros auklets, Brandt's cormorants and western gulls. Due to the number of seals and sea lions, great white sharks are frequently spotted patrolling the waters around the island. It is protected as part of the Año Nuevo State Reserve.

Año Nuevo State Marine Conservation Area and Greyhound Rock State Marine Conservation Area are two adjoining protected marine areas off the coast of Año Nuevo State Park. Like underwater parks, these marine protected areas help conserve ocean wildlife and marine ecosystems. The waters of Año Nuevo State Marine Conservation Area surround Año Nuevo Island.

== Geology ==
As recently as the 18th century, what is today Año Nuevo Island was a peninsula. It became separated from the mainland by a channel that continues to widen. The island is mainly made up of Miocene shale and deposits from ancient dunes, along with a broad intertidal shelf and low, rocky islets, all of which are frequently altered by the erosive pounding of waves, particularly during winter storms.

== Administration ==
Año Nuevo Island is managed by the University of California Natural Reserve System Santa Cruz campus, under an agreement with the California Department of Parks and Recreation. The Año Nuevo Island Reserve, including the island and surrounding waters, comprises 25 of the 4,000 acres (1,600 ha) of the Año Nuevo State Reserve, the rest of which is on the mainland opposite the island.

== Access and facilities ==
Access to Año Nuevo Island is restricted to members of approved research teams; the island is closed to the public. The island has a few abandoned buildings built in the late 19th century. A residential home and foghorn station, all abandoned, are located on the island. The original light tower was deliberately toppled early in the first decade of the 21st century as it began to deteriorate and became a hazard to the resident wildlife. Some of the remaining buildings are used as research facilities.

== Restoration ==
Año Nuevo Island is a haul-out site for thousands of California sea lions. Over the past several decades, they have caused extensive damage to native plants and auklet burrows. In 2010, a conservation non-profit organization, Oikonos, started a restoration project to reduce sea lion trampling, re-grow native plants, and help the auklet populations.

== In literature ==
- New Year Island is a 2013 fiction thriller by Paul Draker, set on modern-day Año Nuevo Island.

== See also ==
- Greyhound Rock State Marine Conservation Area
- List of islands of California
