= Rancho Punta del Año Nuevo =

Mexican land grant in California, USA

Coordinates: 37.180°N 122.350°W

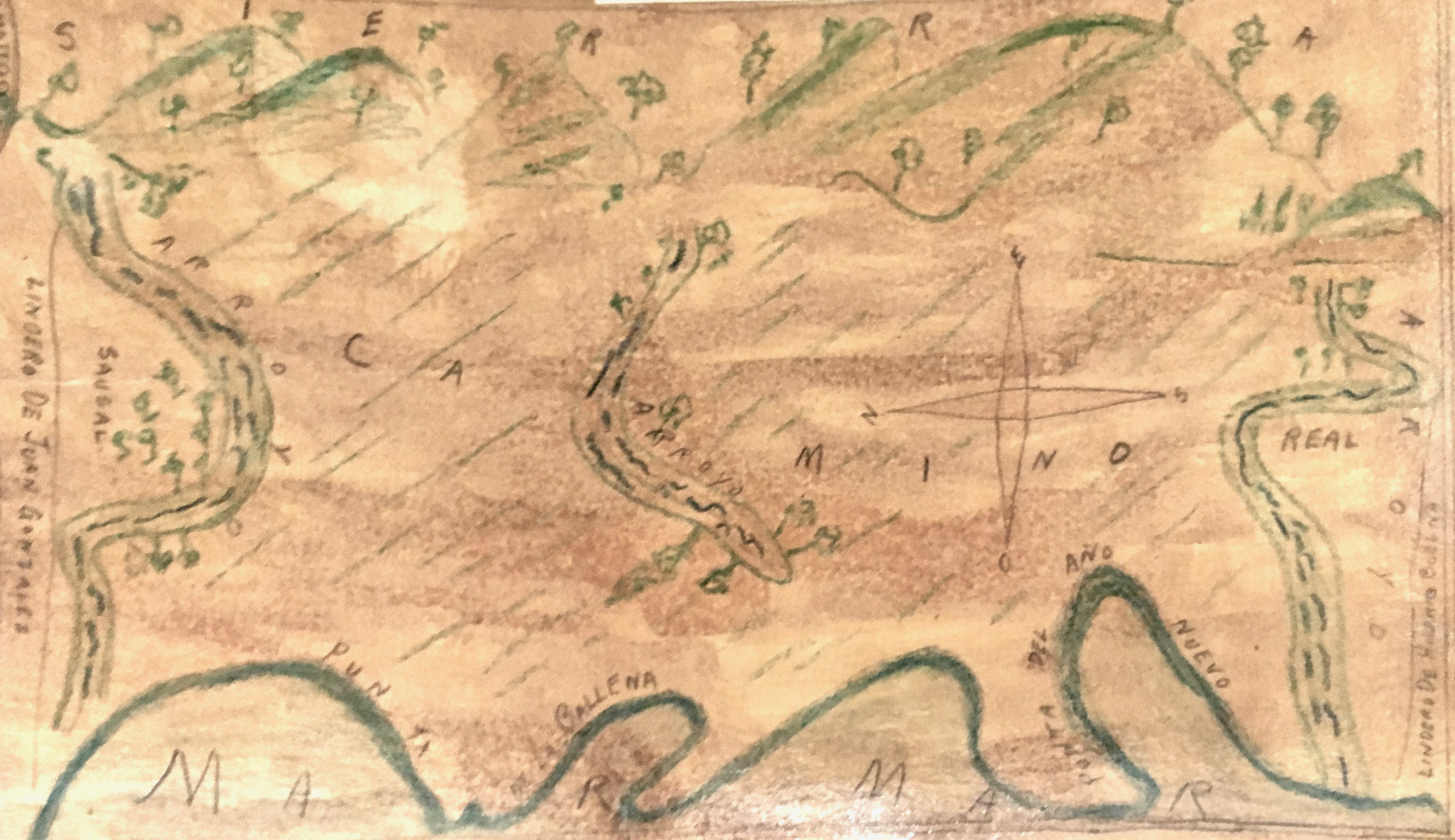
Diseño of land grant

Rancho Punta del Año Nuevo was a 17,753-acre (71.84 km^{2}) Mexican land grant in present day San Mateo County, California given in 1842 by Governor Juan B. Alvarado to Simeon Castro. Following statehood, the land grant was within Santa Cruz County; however, an 1868 boundary adjustment gave the land to San Mateo County. The grant extended along the Pacific coast from Rancho Butano and Arroyo de los Frijoles on the north, past Pigeon Point, Franklin Point to Point Año Nuevo on the south.

== History ==
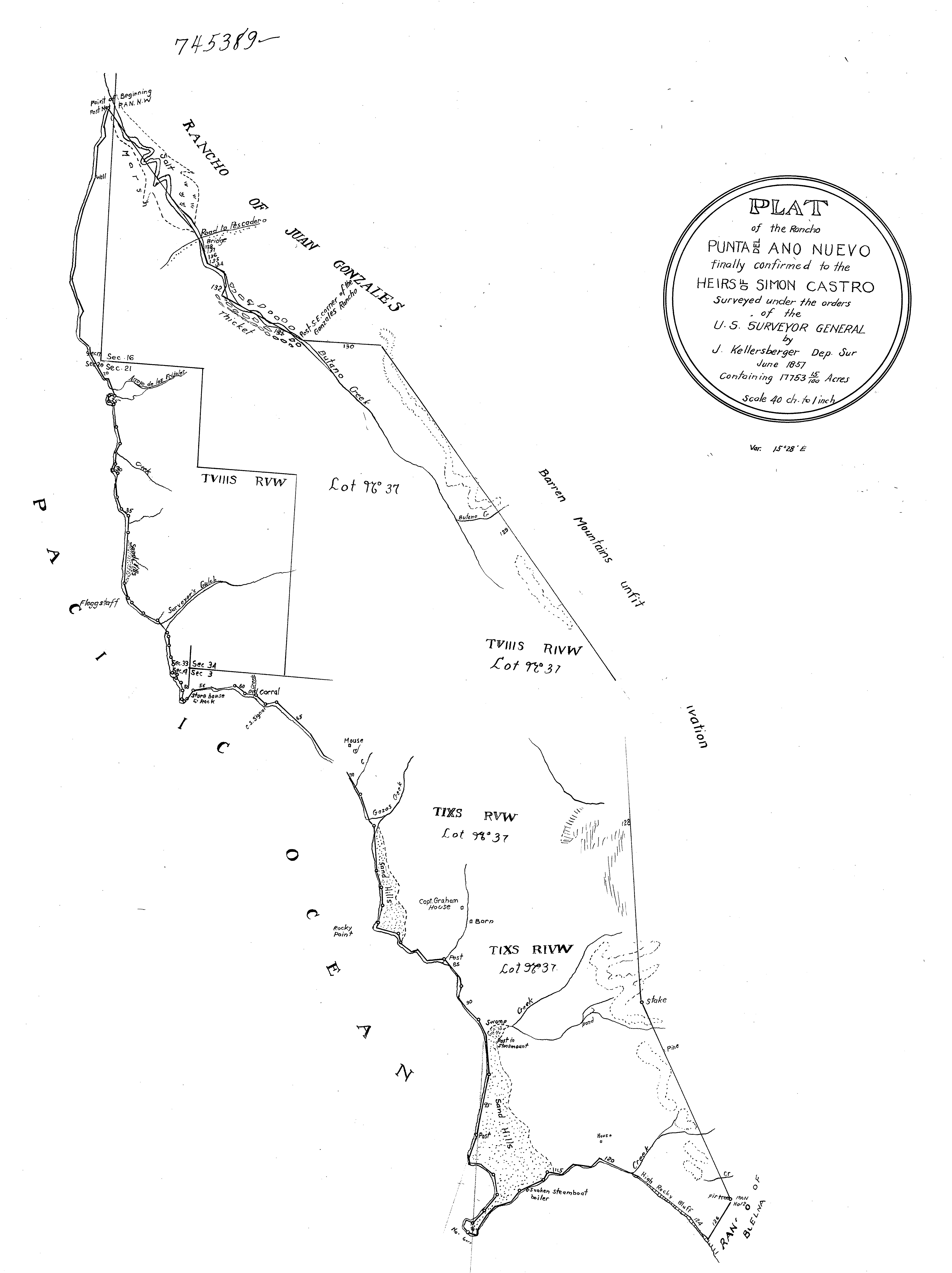
Rancho Punta del Año Nuevo in 1857

The first European land exploration of Alta California, the Spanish Portolà expedition, passed through the area on its way north, recognizing Point Año Nuevo as the one named by Spanish maritime explorer Sebastian Vizcaino on New Year's Day in 1603. Coming north from Waddell Creek, the party passed inland of the point, camping near a creek to the north (Bolton says Gazos Creek; Pacifica Historical Society says Whitehouse Creek) on October 23, 1769. There they found a good-sized native village. Franciscan missionary Juan Crespí, traveling with the expedition, noted in his diary that, "In the middle of the village there was an immense house of a spherical form, large enough to hold all the people of the town, and around it there were some little houses of a pyramidal form, very small, constructed of stakes of pine. Because the large house rose above the others the soldiers called it Village of the Casa Grande"

By 1816 Mission Santa Cruz established a cattle ranch at what they named el Rancho del Punta de Año Nuevo. They built a small adobe building, which was inhabited by mission Indian neophytes who managed up to 3,600 head of cattle. Eventually, Mission Santa Cruz expanded their pastures even further north to reach the Pescadero and Butano Valley grasslands. Under Mexican rule, substantial changes in California society began, including the dismantling of the mission properties and expansion of colonists into California’s former mission landholdings. Settlers petitioned for land grants, and between the years of 1834 and 1836 alone the Mexican Congress released million acres of mission lands to private ownership. Without the authority of the missions, the Indians lost any potential claim to their lands. The Former Mission cattle ranches at Pescadero and Año Nuevo were ultimately divided into three separate Mexican Period land grants deeded to Mexican citizens. These new land divisions included Rancho San Antonio- or Pescadero, Rancho Punta del Año Nuevo, and Rancho Butano.

José Simeon Nepomuncena Castro (1783–1842), the son of Marcario Castro, was born in Santa Barbara. Simeon Castro was a soldier at Monterey in 1809, and Alcalde of Monterey in 1838–39. He married Maria Antonia Pico (1804–1883). He was granted Rancho Bolsa Nueva y Moro Cojo in 1837, and the four square league Rancho Punta del Año Nuevo in 1842. Simeon Castro died in 1842.

With the cession of California to the United States following the Mexican-American War, the 1848 Treaty of Guadalupe Hidalgo provided that the land grants would be honored. As required by the Land Act of 1851, a claim for Rancho Punta del Año Nuevo was filed with the Public Land Commission in 1852, and the grant was patented to Maria Antonia Pico de Castro and heirs of Simeon Castro in 1857.

In 1851 Maria Antonio Pico de Castro sold Rancho Punta del Año Nuevo to Santa Cruz County pioneer Isaac Graham. Graham (or one of his tenants) built a 2-story white house in 1857 which is remembered in the name of Whitehouse Creek.

In 1862 Clark & Coburn of San Francisco purchased the adjacent Rancho Butano and Rancho Punta del Año Nuevo grants. Loren Coburn, born in Vermont, came to California in 1851, and worked first in mining. Coburn bought out his brother-in-law Jeremiah Clark. Coburn was an extremely aggressive land owner, contesting boundaries, and a perpetual litigant in the courts and was widely disliked. Coburn leased much of the land to a dairy enterprise run by the Steele family (Rensselaer, Isaac and Edgar) from Delaware. In 1869 Steele family bought 7,000 acres (28 km^{2}) south of Gazos Creek. Coburn and Clark’s legacy of defending their land slowed the subdivision and development of Rancho Punta del Año Nuevo.

== Historic sites of the Rancho ==
- Pigeon Point Lighthouse
