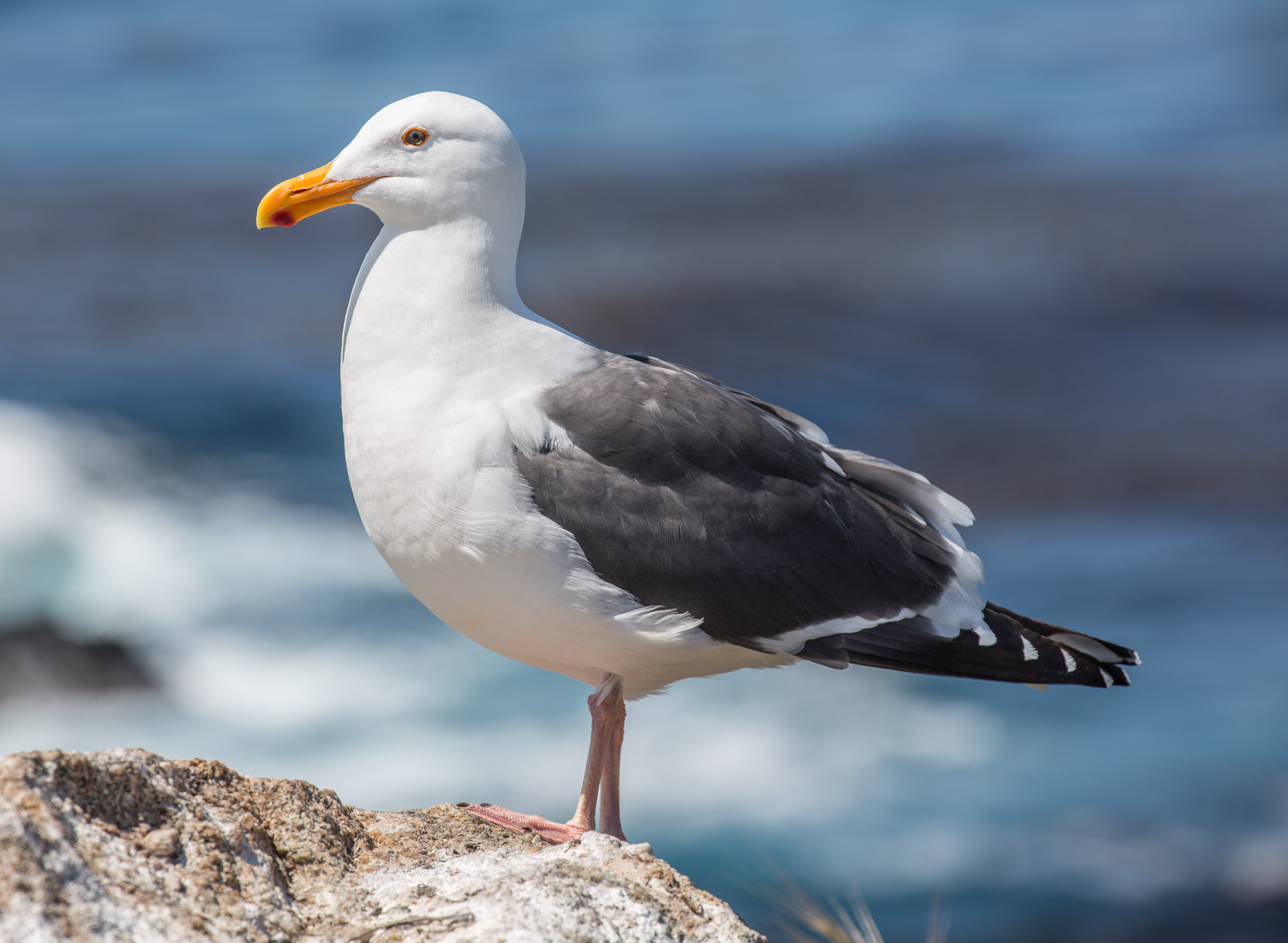
- Adult
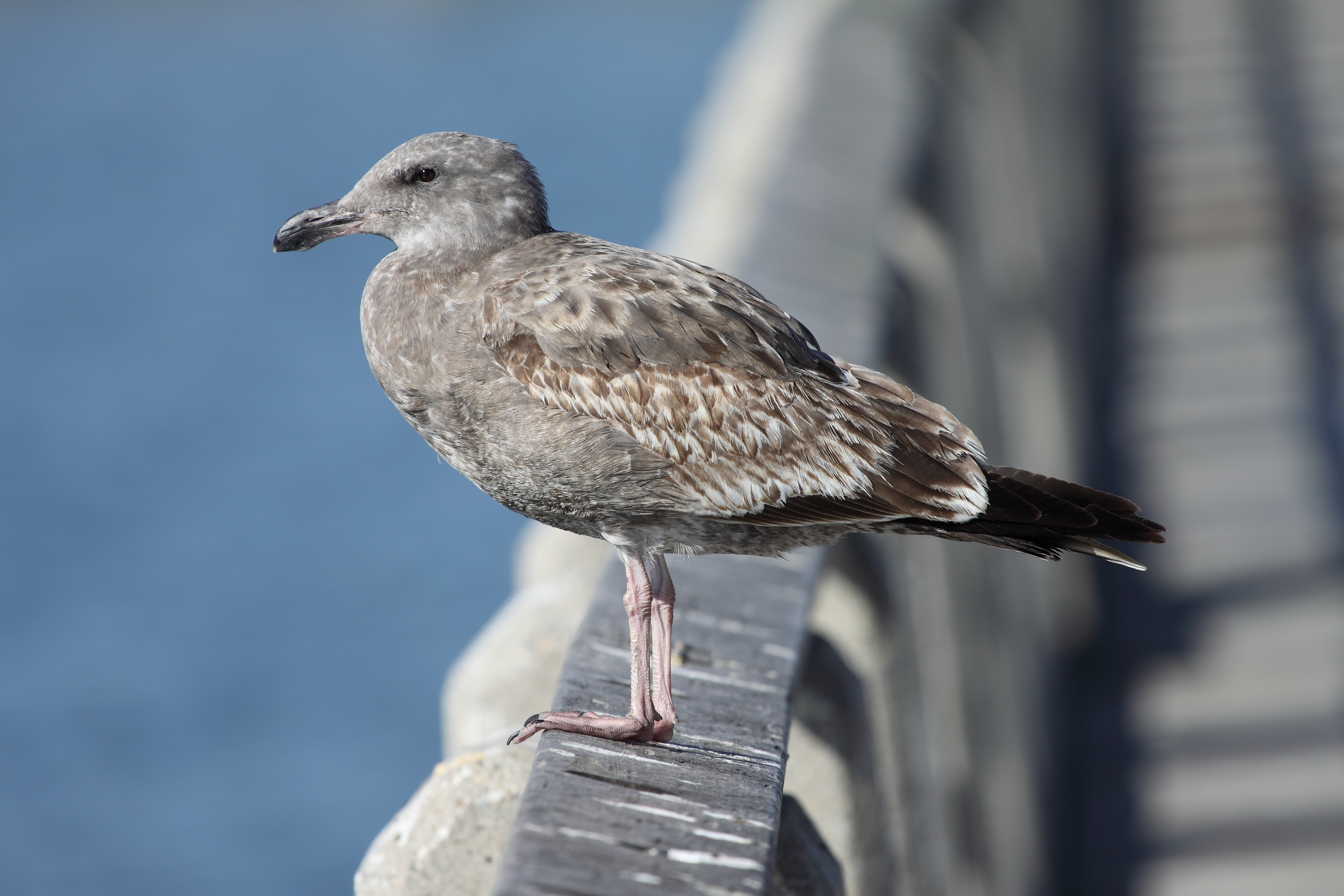
- Juvenile (1st Winter)

Conservation status
- Least Concern (IUCN 3.1)

Scientific classification
- Kingdom: Animalia
- Phylum: Chordata
- Class: Aves
- Order: Charadriiformes
- Family: Laridae
- Genus: Larus
- Species: L. occidentalis

Binomial name
- Larus occidentalis Audubon, 1839
- Distribution Year-round Nonbreeding

= Western gull =

Species of bird

The western gull (Larus occidentalis) is a large white-headed gull that lives on the west coast of North America and the Pacific Ocean. The western gull ranges from British Columbia, Canada, to Baja California, Mexico.

It was previously considered conspecific with the yellow-footed gull (Larus livens) of the Gulf of California.

== Physical description ==
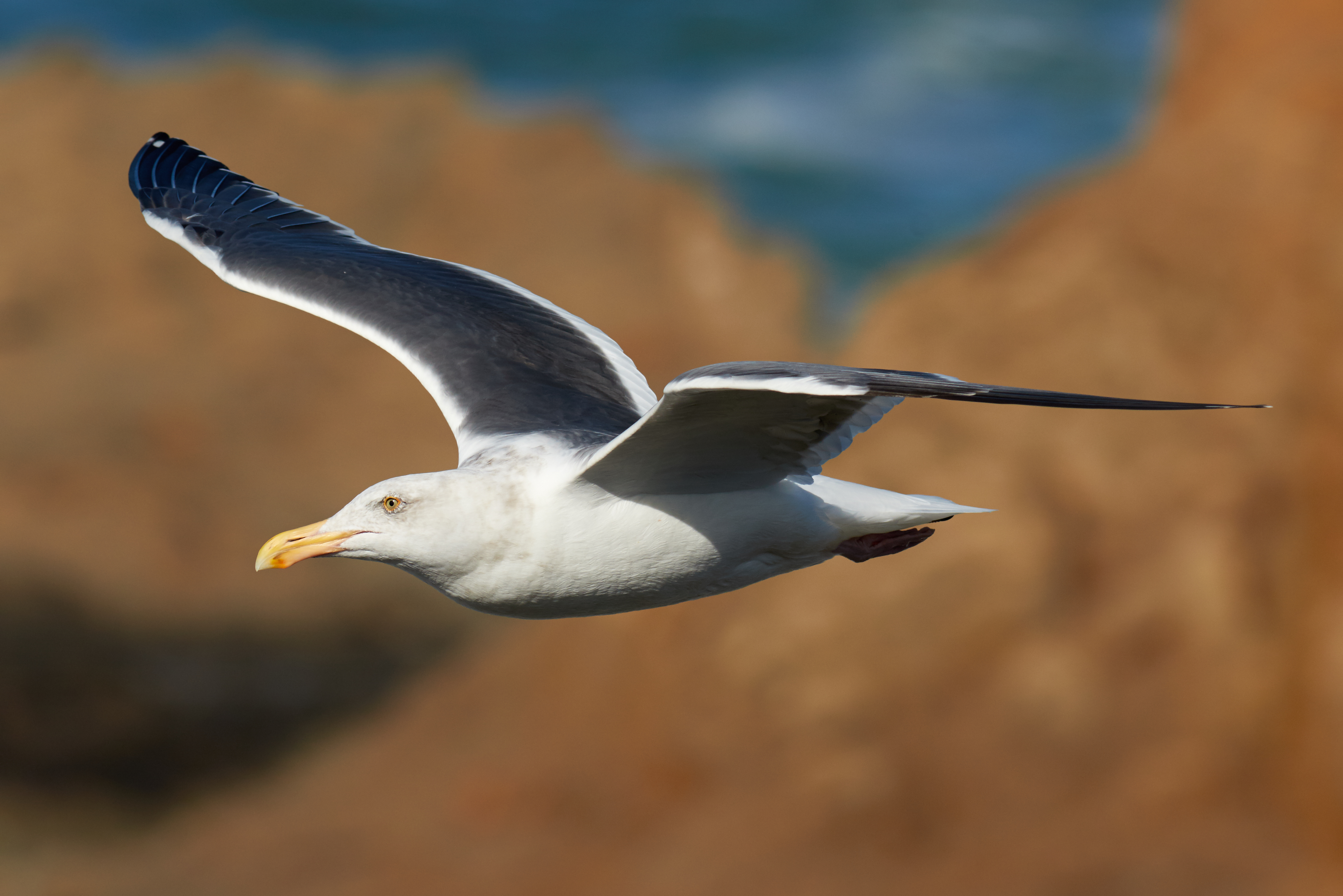
Western Gull in flight over the cliffs of Bodega Head

The western gull is a large gull that can measure 55 to 68 cm (22 to 27 in) in total length, spans 130 to 144 cm (51 to 57 in) across the wings, and weighs 800 to 1,400 g (1.8 to 3.1 lb). The average mass among a survey of 48 gulls of the species was 1,011 g (2.229 lb). Among standard measurements, the wing chord is 38 to 44.8 cm (15.0 to 17.6 in), the bill is 4.7 to 6.2 cm (1.9 to 2.4 in) and the tarsus is 5.8 to 7.5 cm (2.3 to 3.0 in). The western gull has a white head and body, and upperparts or mantle is dark grey. The head generally remains white year-round, developing little to no streaking patterns in northern populations during the nonbreeding phase (basic plumage). It is debatable the extent of head markings can be found in pure Western Gulls as they form a hybrid zone with the glaucous-winged gull (Larus glaucescens) which has a more extensive hood. It has a large and bulbous-tipped yellow bill with a red subterminal spot (this is the small spot near the end of the bill that chicks peck in order to stimulate feeding). The eye colour varies, averaging pale yellow in southern populations and darker in northern populations. It closely resembles the slaty-backed gull (Larus schistisagus) of Asia, but the latter species has paler eyes, a straighter bill, deeper pink legs and eye orbitals, as well as conspicuous white spots ("string of pearls") on the inner primaries when seen in flight not seen in Western Gulls. Western gulls take approximately four years to reach their full plumage, their layer of feathers and the patterns and colors on the feathers. In adult plumage, The largest western gull colony is on the Farallon Islands, located about 26 mi (40 km) west of San Francisco, California; an estimated 30,000 gulls live in the San Francisco Bay area. Western gulls also live in the Oregon Coast.

Two subspecies are recognized, differentiated by the mantle and eye colouration. The northern subspecies L. o. occidentalis is found between Central Washington and Central California, has dark grey upperparts. The southern subspecies L. o. wymani is found between central and southern California has a darker mantle (approaching that of the Great black-backed gull) and has paler eyes on average. wymani has more advanced plumage development than occidentalis, and generally attains adult plumage by the third year.

== Auditory description ==
Western gull calls
Western gull calls, recorded at the Golden Gate National Recreation Area

The call of the Western gull is bright, piercing, and repetitive.

== Distribution and habitat ==
The western gull is a year-round resident in California, Oregon, Baja California, and southern Washington. It is migratory, moving to northern Washington, British Columbia, and Baja California Sur to spend the nonbreeding season.

== Behavior ==
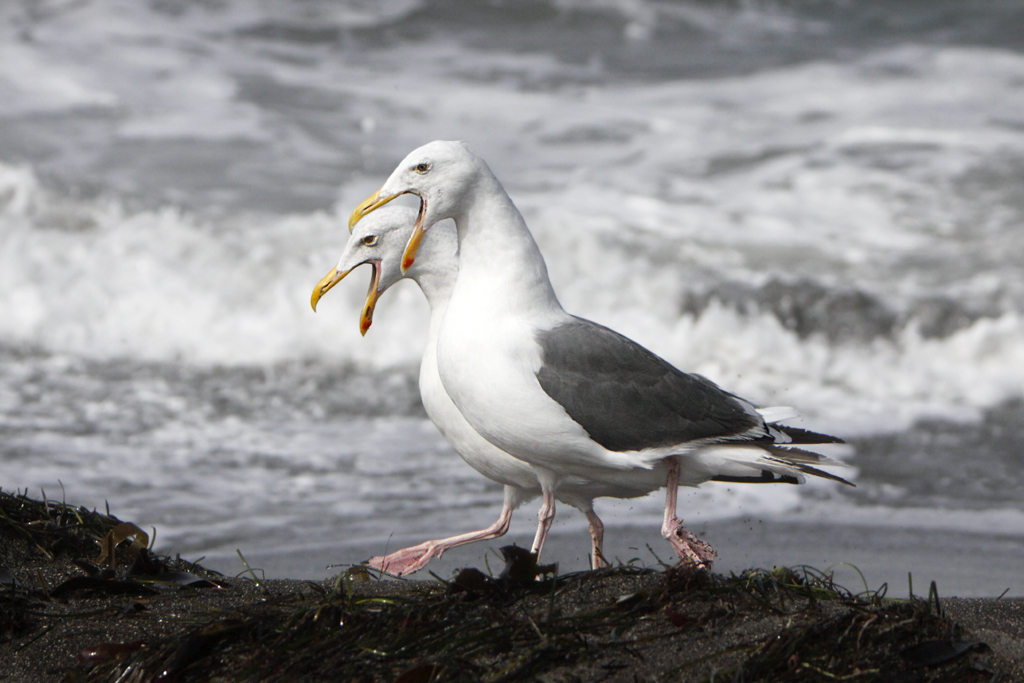
Pair-bonding behaviour

The western gull rarely ventures more than approximately 100 miles inland, almost never very far from the ocean; it is almost an exclusively marine gull. It nests on offshore islands and rocks along the coast, and on islands inside estuaries. A colony also exists on Ano Nuevo Island, then Anacapa Island and Santa Barbara Island in Channel Islands National Park, and Alcatraz Island in San Francisco Bay. In the colonies, long term pairs aggressively defend territories whose borders may shift slightly from year to year, but are maintained for the life of the male.

=== Feeding ===
Western gulls feed in pelagic environments and in intertidal environments. At sea, they take fish and invertebrates like krill, squid and jellyfish. They are unable to dive and feed exclusively on the surface of the water. On land they feed on seal and sea lion carcasses and roadkill, as well as cockles, starfish, limpets and snails in the intertidal zone. They also feed on human food refuse, in human-altered habitats including landfills, and take food given to them, or stolen from people at marinas, beaches and parks. Western gulls are known to be predatory, killing and eating the young of other birds, especially ducklings, and even the adults of some smaller bird species. Western gulls, including one who lived at Oakland's Lake Merritt are known for killing and eating pigeons (rock doves). They will also snatch fish from a cormorant's or pelican's mouth before it is swallowed. The bird has also been observed directly pilfering milk from the elephant seal's teat.

== Reproduction ==
A nest of vegetation is constructed inside the parent's territory and 3 eggs are laid. These eggs are incubated for a month. The chicks, once hatched, remain inside the territory until they have fledged. Chicks straying into the territory of another gull are liable to be killed by that territory's pair. Chick mortality is high, with on average one chick surviving to fledging. On occasion, abandoned chicks will be adopted by other gulls.

=== Hybridization ===
Between Puget Sound in Washington and Northern Oregon, the western gull hybridizes frequently with the glaucous-winged gull, a cross referred to as the Olympic gull. Hybrids between the two species are variable and may features of either parent species, they have paler mantles and wingtips paler than Western gulls but darker than Glaucous-winged gulls. Additionally, the nonbreeding plumage of hybrids typically has darker head markings than pure Western gulls, which have little to no streaking in their nonbreeding plumage.

The prevalence of 'Olympic gull' hybrids is an example of bounded hybrid superiority, where natural selection favours hybrids in areas of intermediate habitat. One study found that females paired with hybrid males have higher breeding success than pairs of the same species. In the central part of the hybrid zone, clutch size was larger among pairs with hybrid males, many of which established breeding grounds in more vegetative cover than pure western gull males, which preferred sand habitat resulting in heavier predation. In the northern section of the hybrid zone, there was no difference in clutch size, but breeding success is higher due to the hybrids being more similar to western gulls in foraging behaviour, feeding more on fish than glaucous-winged gulls. Little evidence of assortative mating was observed, except for weak assortative mating among hybrids in absence of mixed species pairs.

== Western gulls and humans ==
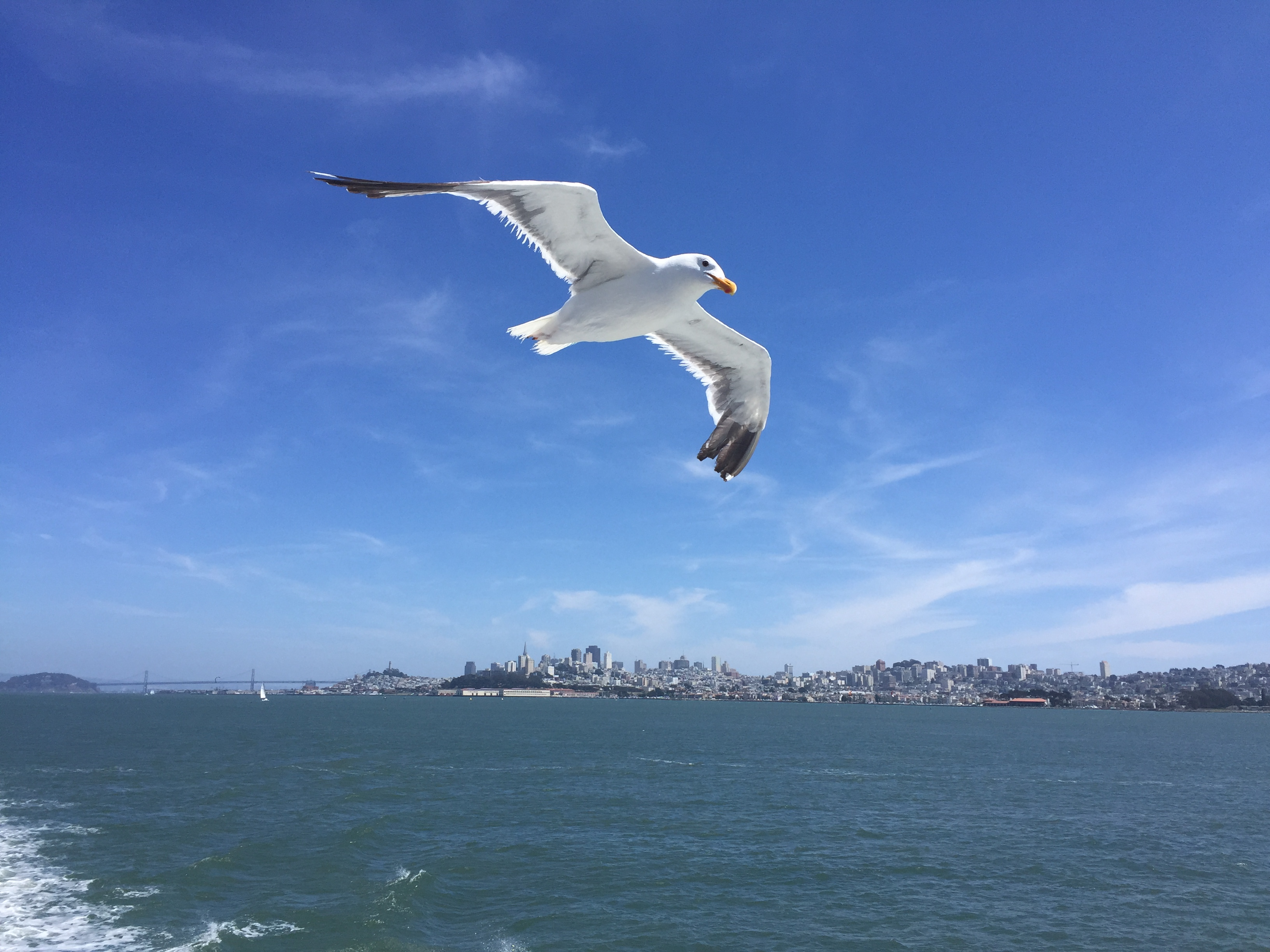
Over San Francisco Bay

The western gull is currently not considered threatened. However, they have, for a gull, a restricted range. Numbers were greatly reduced in the 19th century by the taking of seabird eggs for the growing city of San Francisco. Western gull colonies also suffered from disturbance where they were turned into lighthouse stations, or, in the case of Alcatraz, a prison.

Western gulls are very aggressive when defending their territories and consequently were persecuted by some as a menace. The automation of lighthouses and the closing of Alcatraz Prison allowed the species to reclaim parts of its range. They are currently vulnerable to climatic events like El Niño events and oil spills.

Thousands of western gulls and chicks reside at the Anacapa Island in Channel Islands National Park.

Western gulls have become a serious nuisance to the San Francisco Giants baseball team. Thousands of gulls fly over Oracle Park in San Francisco during late innings of games. They swarm the field, defecate on fans, and after games eat leftovers of stadium food in the seats; how the birds know when games are about to end is unknown. The gulls left while a red-tailed hawk visited the park in late 2011, but returned after the hawk disappeared. Federal law prohibits shooting the birds, and hiring a falconer would cost the Giants $8000 a game.

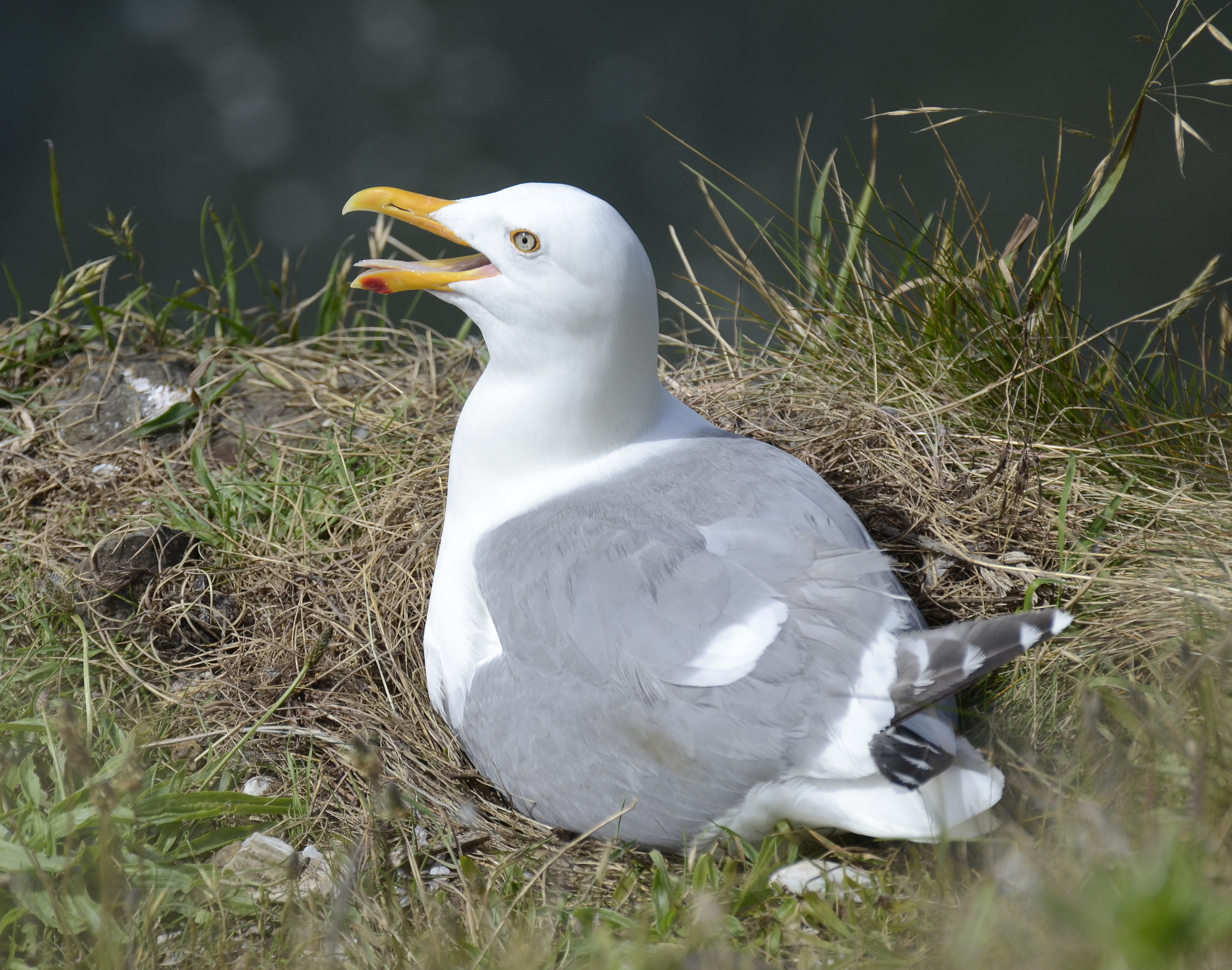
Western gull x Glaucous-winged gull hybrid nesting in Oregon. Note the grey (not black) wingtips and paler mantle compared to a pure Western gull.

== In media ==
The western gull was one of the antagonists in Alfred Hitchcock's famous movie The Birds which was filmed in Bodega Bay, California.

== Gallery ==
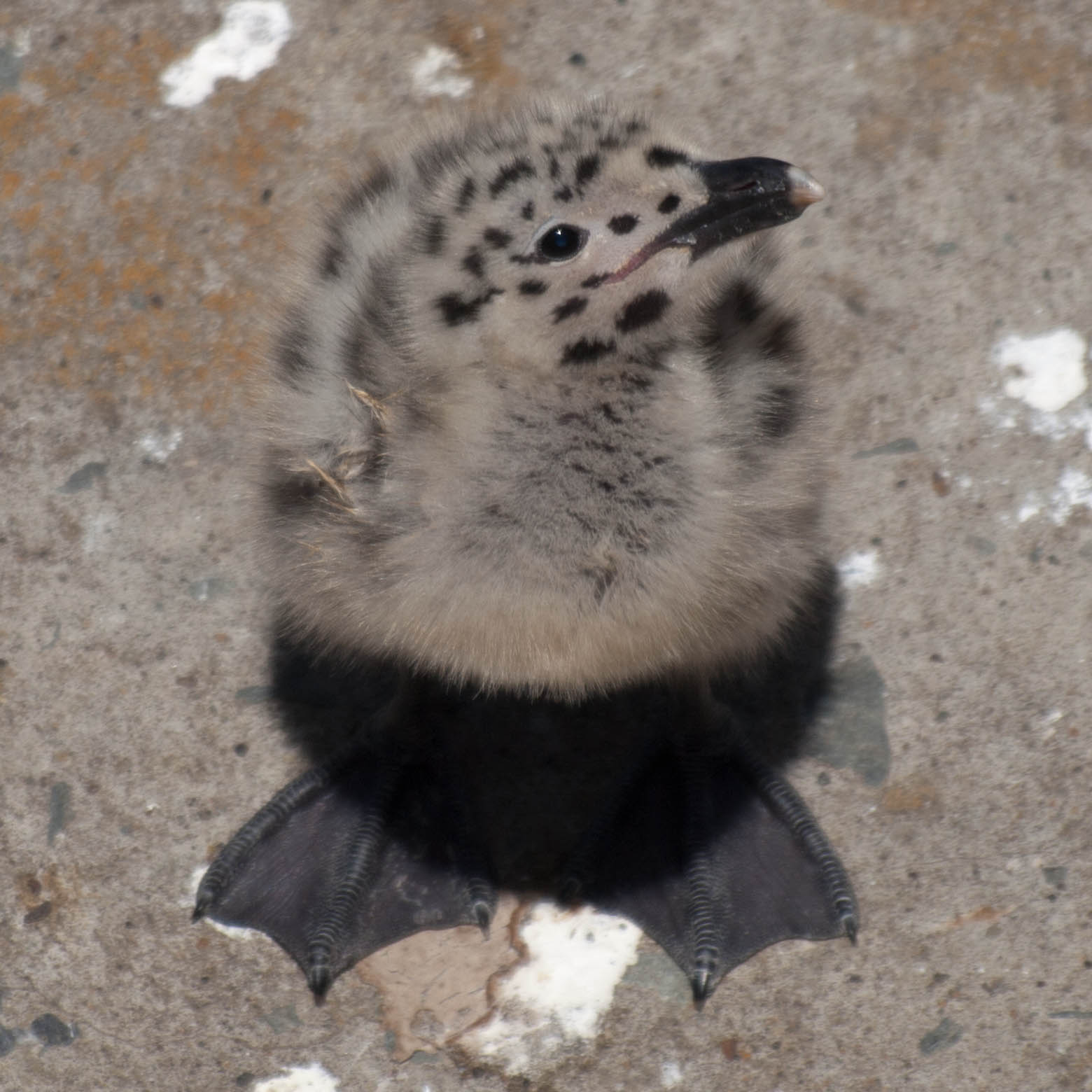
A western gull chick on Alcatraz Island

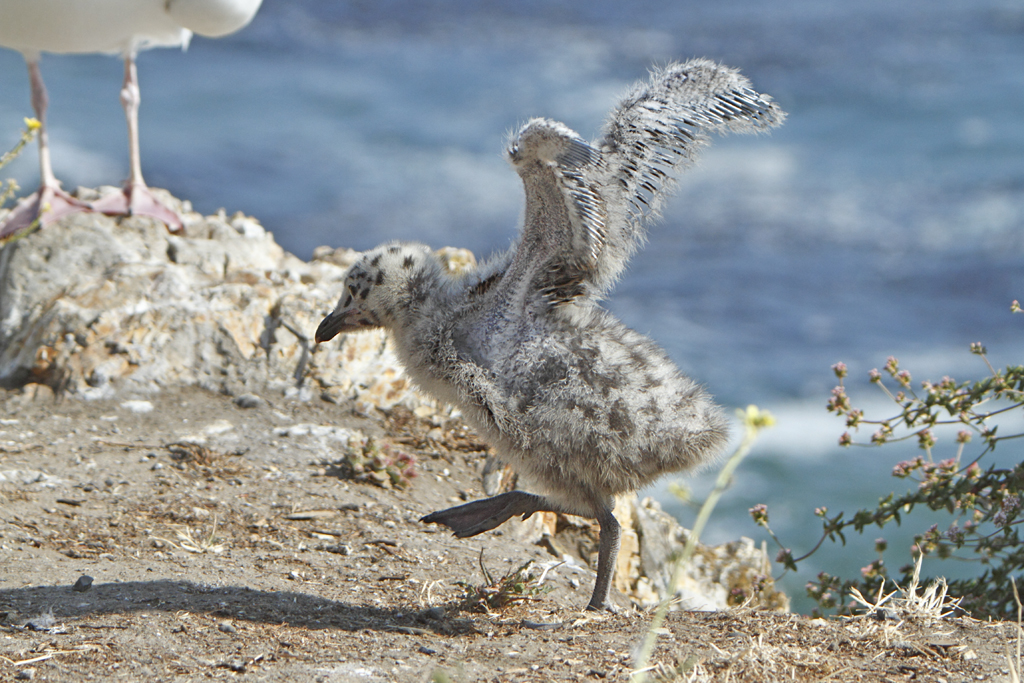
3-week-old chick

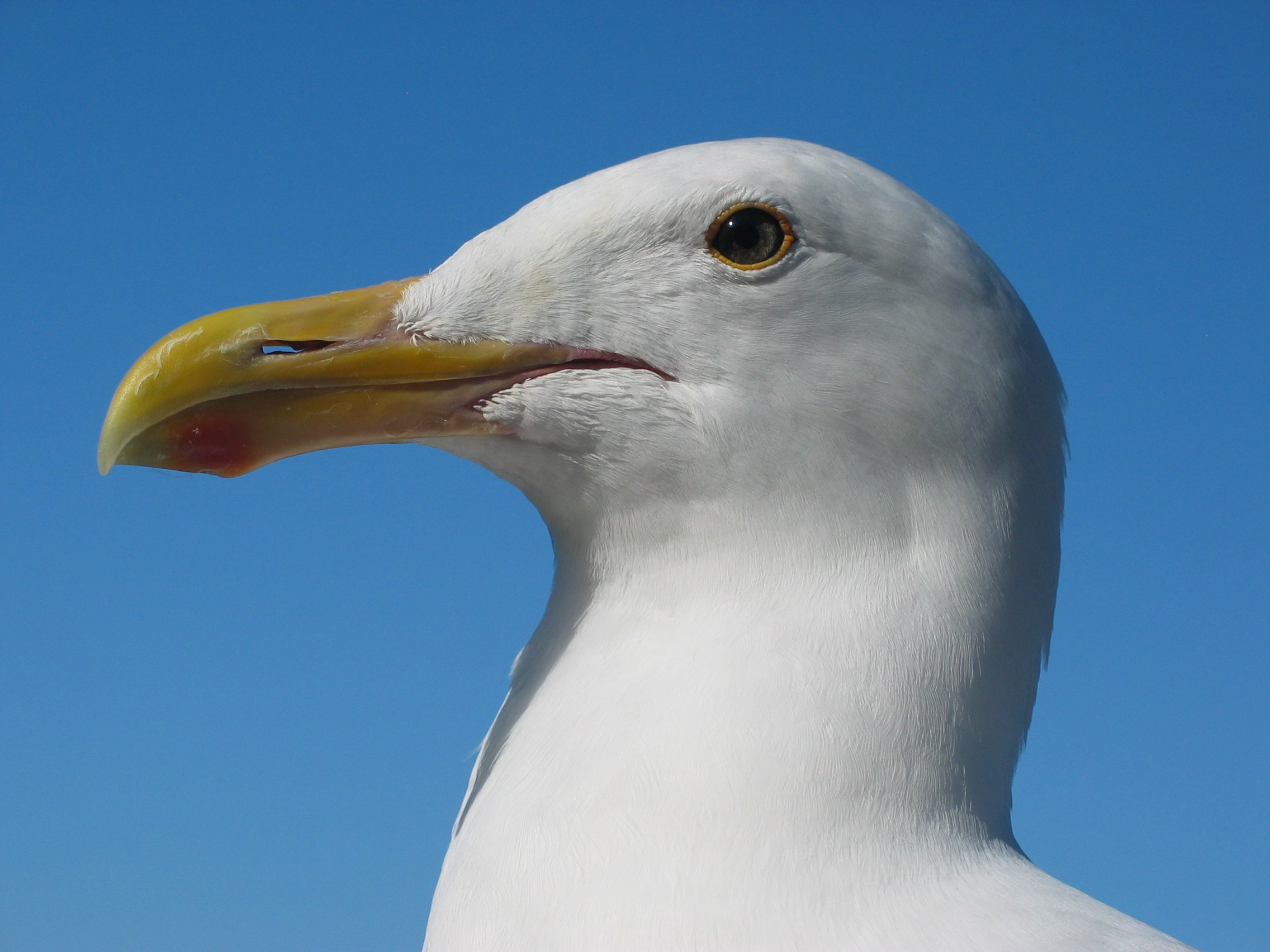
Portrait

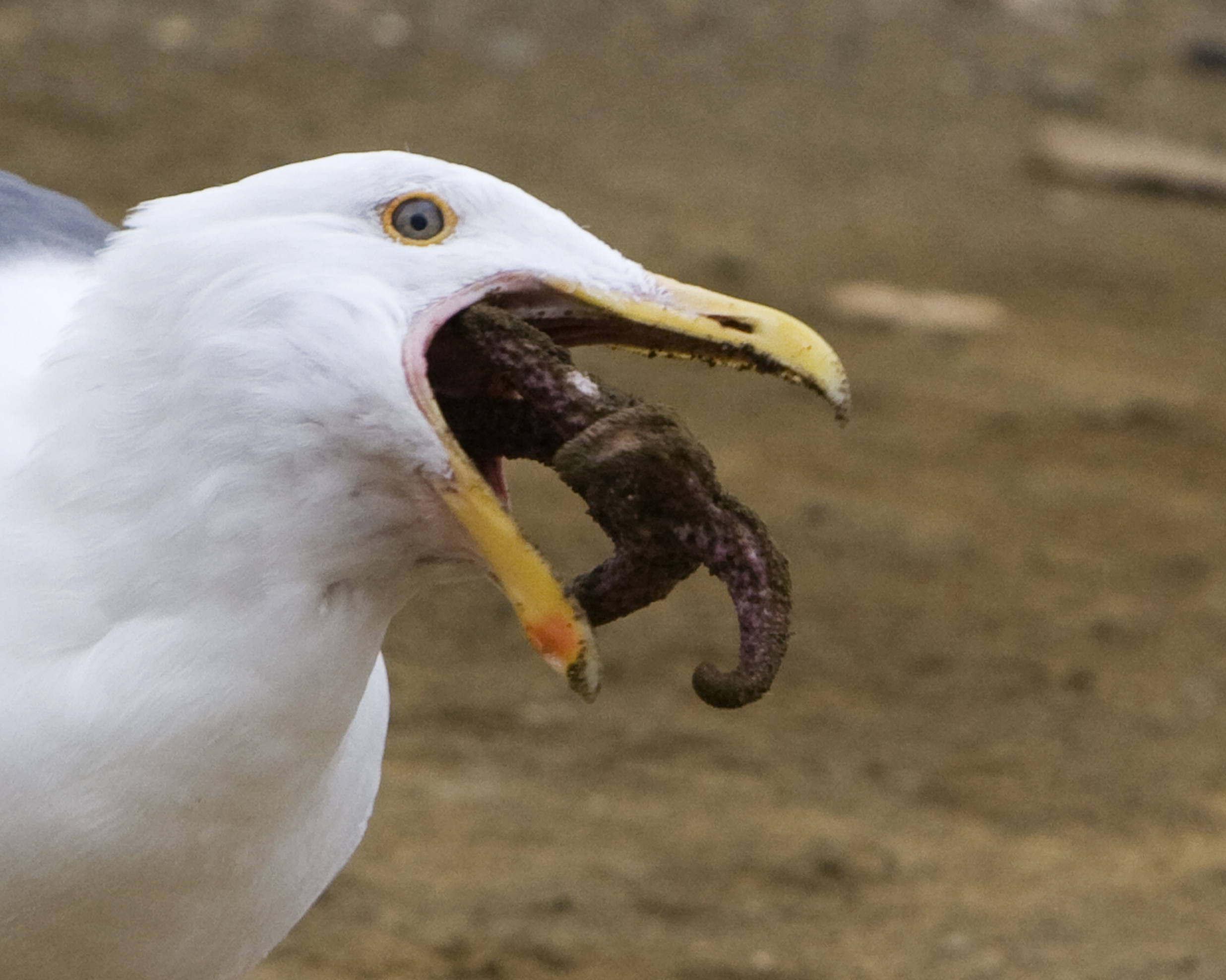
Feeding on a starfish

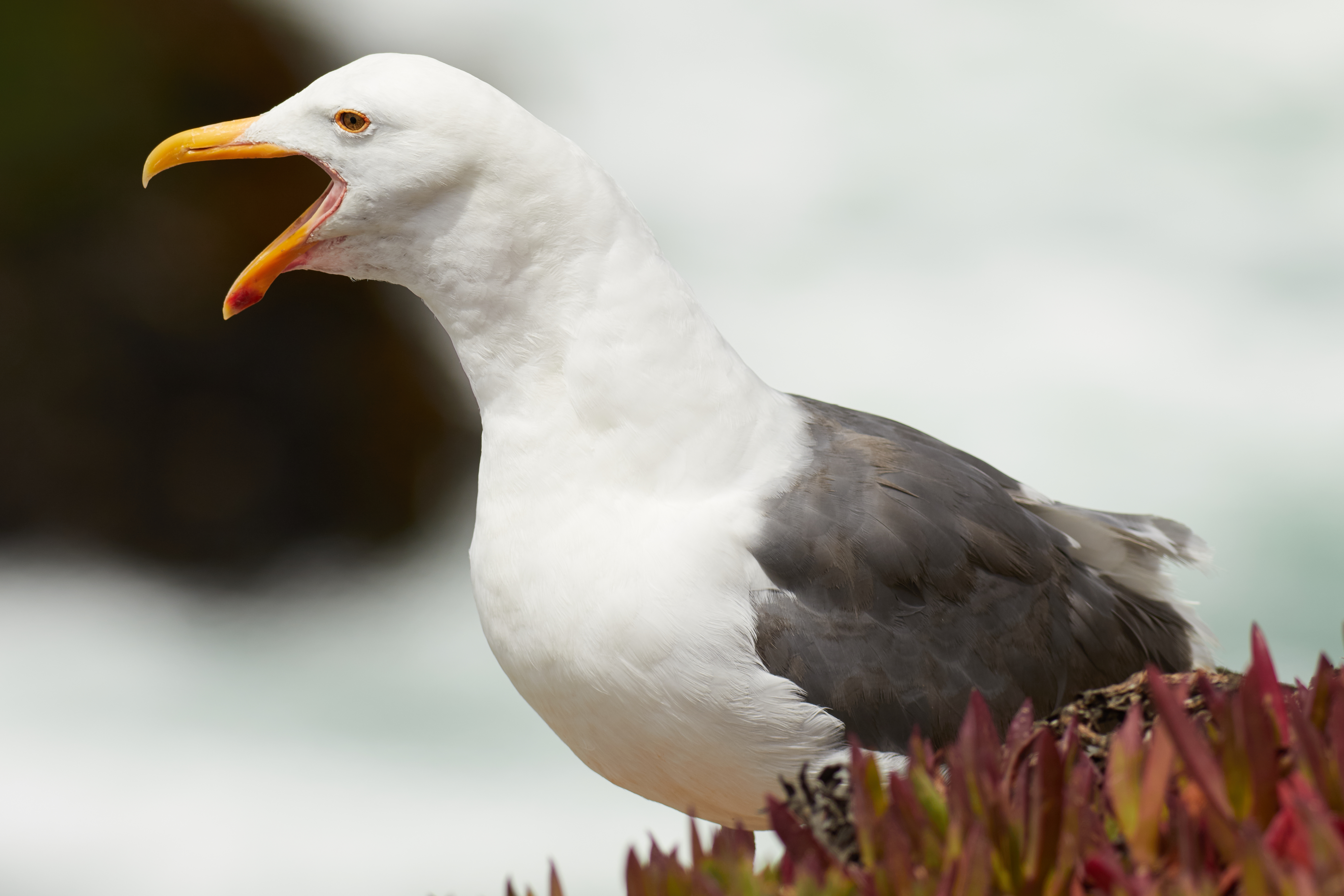
Vocalizing

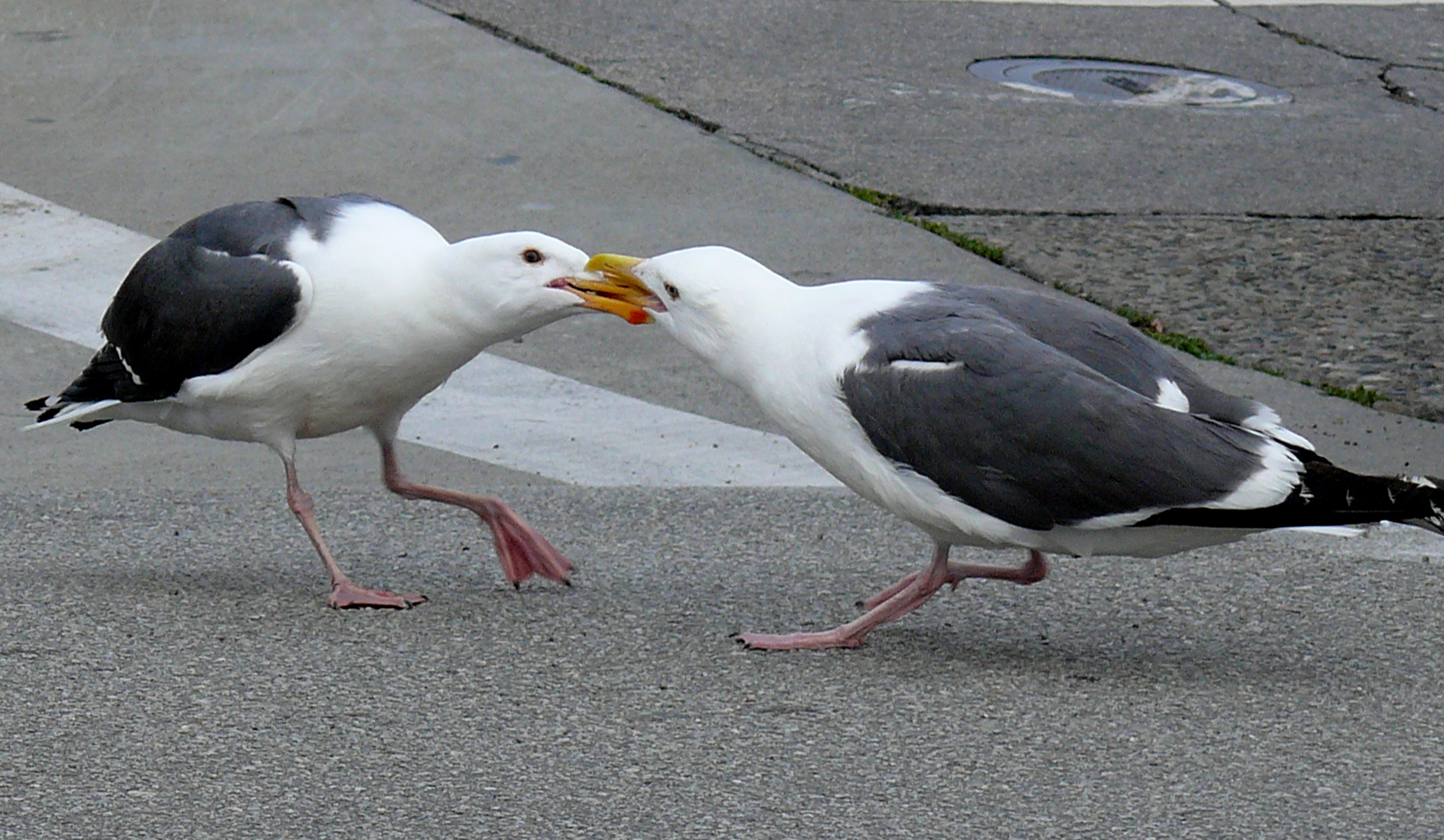
Adults fighting

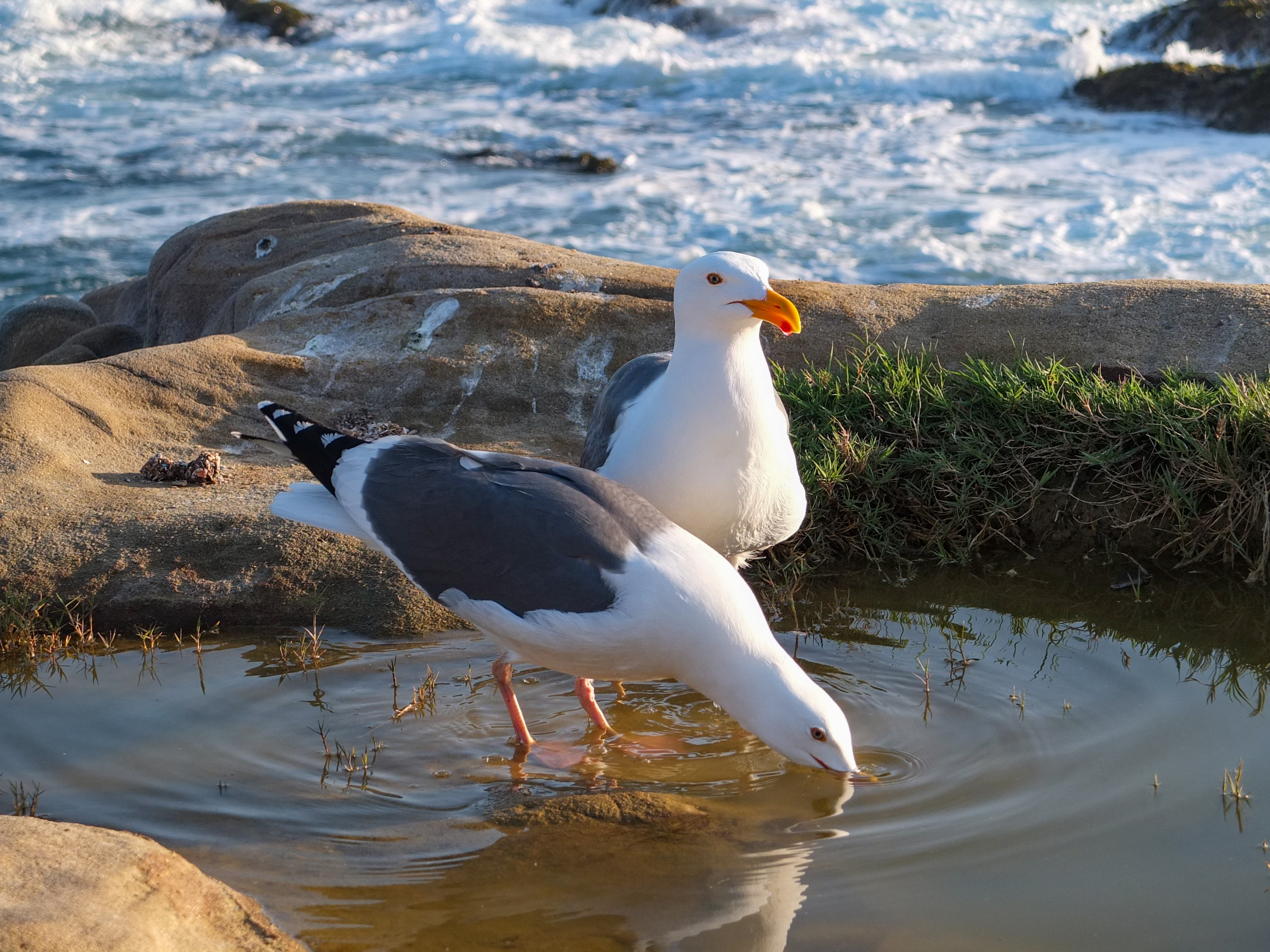
A pair at Point Lobos

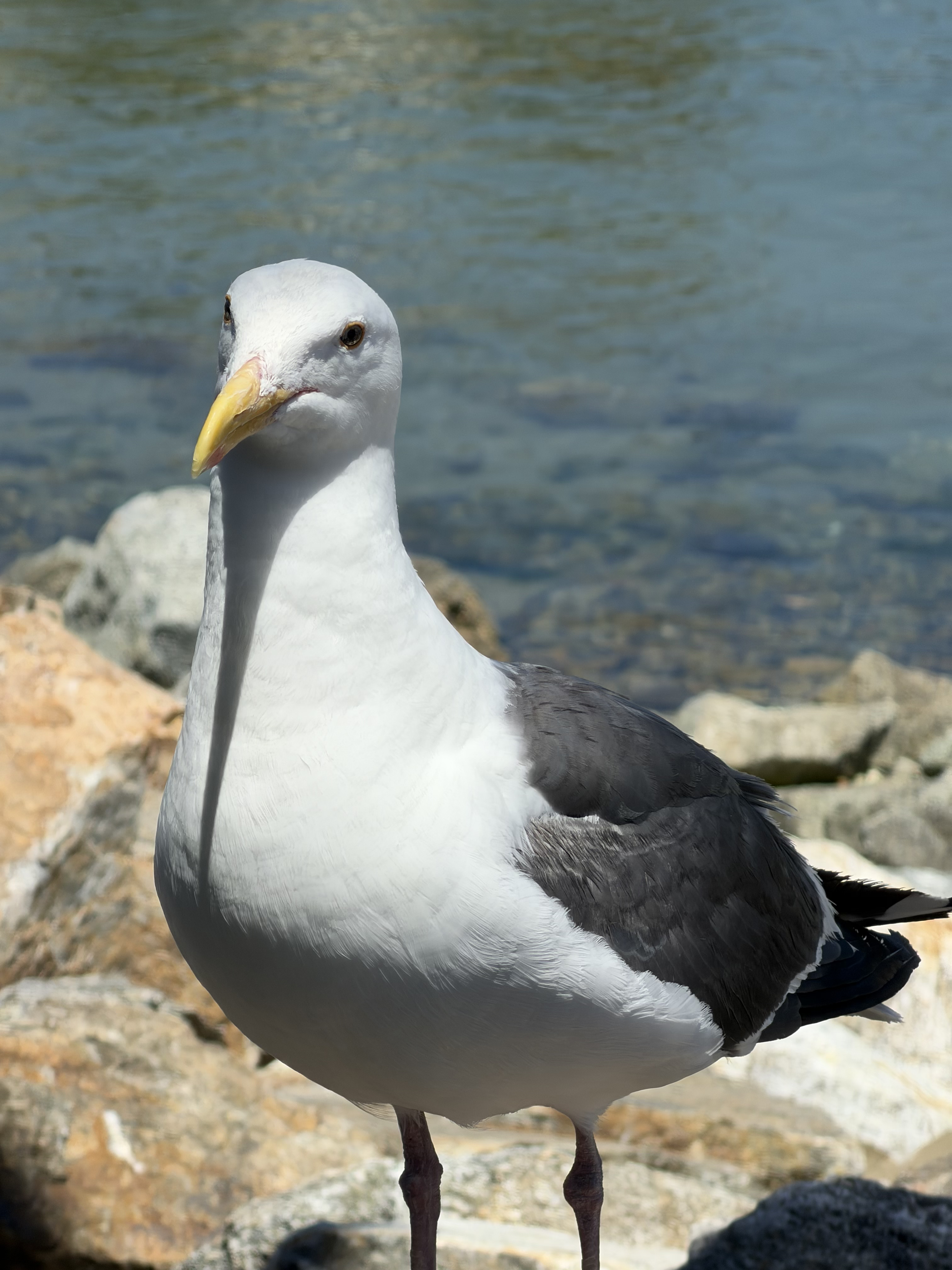
An adult at Fisherman's Wharf
