= Rancho Pescadero (Gonzalez) =

Mexican land grant in California

Coordinates: 37.280°N 122.390°W

Rancho Pescadero (also called Rancho San Antonio) was a 3,282-acre (13.28 km^{2}) Mexican land grant in present-day San Mateo County, California, given in 1833 by Governor José Figueroa to Juan José Gonzales. At the time, the grant was in Santa Cruz County; an 1868 boundary adjustment gave the land to San Mateo County. The name means fishing place. The grant extended along the Pacific coast from Pomponio Creek on the north to Butano Creek and Rancho Butano on the south, and encompassed present day Pescadero.

== History ==
Juan José Gonzales, came to California with his father José Manuel Gonzales, as settlers on the 1775 De Anza Expedition. In 1833, Juan José Gonzales was mayordomo of the Mission Santa Cruz. Under Mexican rule, substantial changes in California society began, including the dismantling of the mission properties and expansion of colonists into California's former mission landholdings. Settlers petitioned for land grants, and between the years of 1834 and 1836 alone the Mexican Congress released million acres of mission lands to private ownership. Without the authority of the missions, the Indians lost any potential claim to their lands. The Former Mission cattle ranches at Pescadero and Año Nuevo were ultimately divided into three separate Mexican Period land grants deeded to Mexican citizens. These new land divisions included Rancho San Antonio- or Pescadero, Rancho Punta del Año Nuevo, and Rancho Butano.

He received a grant for the former Mission Santa Cruz pasture land, when the Mission was secularized. He built an adobe house on the eastern side of the property near Pescadero Creek and a wood-frame house near Butano Creek, where his vaqueros lived. Gonzales was an absentee ranchero who lived with his large family of thirteen children near Mission Santa Cruz, while vaqueros and other laborers tended to the rancho.

A claim for Rancho Pescadero was filed with the Public Land Commission in 1852. Gonzales had originally requested a four square league grant, from Rancho San Gregorio on the north to Rancho Punta del Año Nuevo on the south; yet the grant papers specified the grant as only one league along the coast by three quarters of a league wide. Gonzales unsuccessfully appealed to the US Supreme Court in 1859, and the grant for three quarters of a square league was patented to Juan José Gonzales in 1866.

In 1852, Juan Gonzales deeded a small portion of the Pescadero grant to family members, and sold 800 acres (3 km^{2}) of the valley floor to the Moore family. Alexander Moore (1823–1902) came overland from Missouri to California in 1847, and moved to Pescadero in 1850. In 1860, the Bartlett Weeks Family, natives of Maine who came to California in 1859 purchased 157 acres of what is now downtown Pescadero and became neighbors with Moore who had already built his house on the north side of Pescadero Creek in 1853. Clearly the influx of American and other settlers was transforming the coastal area into a mosaic of subdivided properties.
