= Greyhound Rock State Marine Conservation Area =

Marine protected area in California's central coast

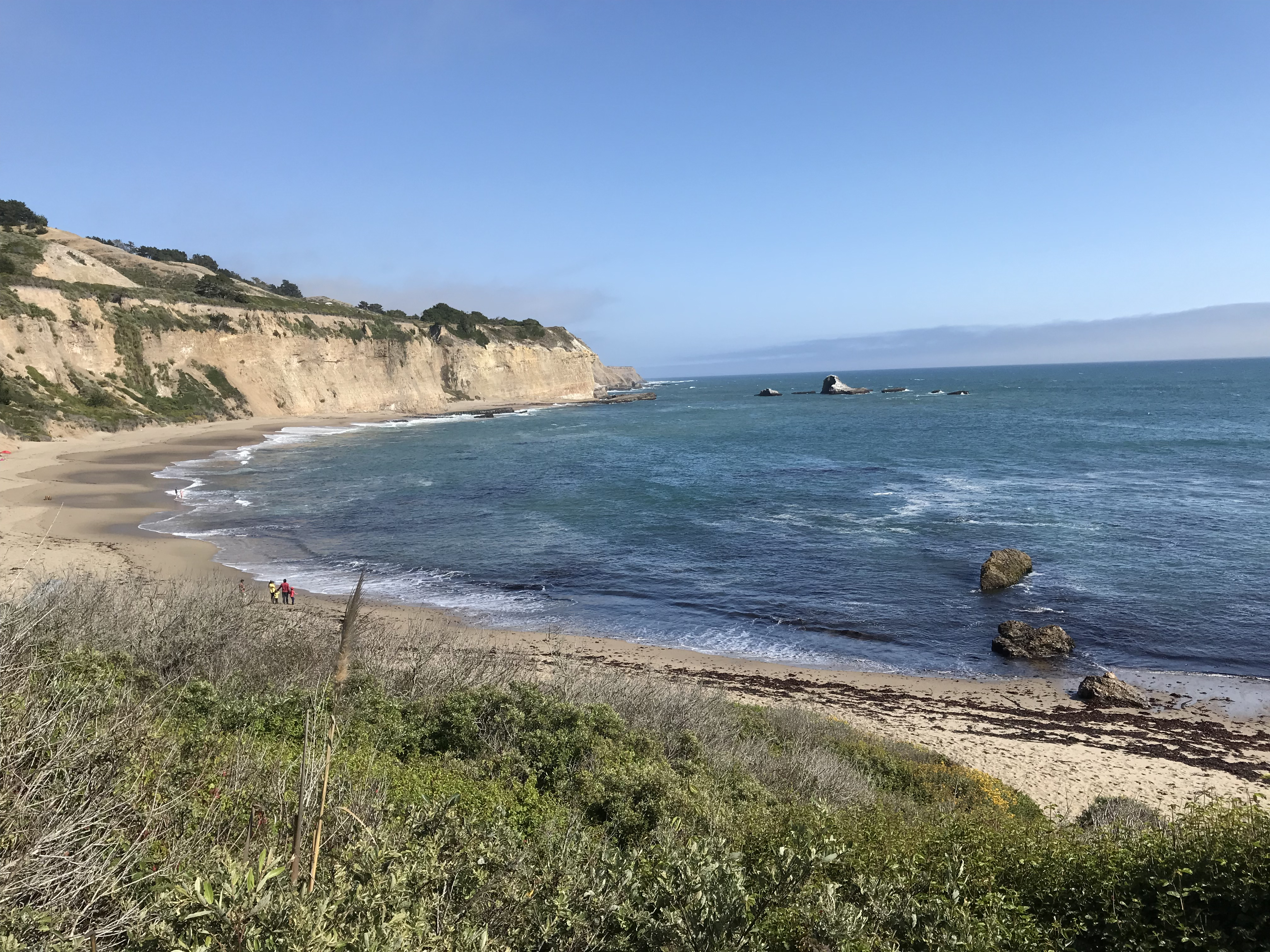
View of Greyhound Rock Beach, part of the Greyhound Rock State Marine Conservation Area

Greyhound Rock State Marine Conservation Area (SMCA) is one of two adjoining marine protected areas off the coast of San Mateo County and Santa Cruz County, on California's central coast. The area is approximately 55 miles (89 km) south of San Francisco. The SMCA is 11.81 square miles (30.6 km^{2}). Within the SMCA fishing and take of all living marine resources is prohibited except the recreational take of giant kelp, squid, salmon, and other finfish, subject to various conditions. Also permitted is the commercial take of giant kelp, salmon, and squid, subject to various conditions.

== History ==
Greyhound Rock State Marine Conservation Area was established in September 2007 by the California Department of Fish & Game. It was one of 29 marine protected areas adopted during the first phase of the Marine Life Protection Act Initiative. The Marine Life Protection Act Initiative (or MLPAI) is a collaborative public process to create a statewide network of marine protected areas along the California coastline.

== Geography and natural features ==
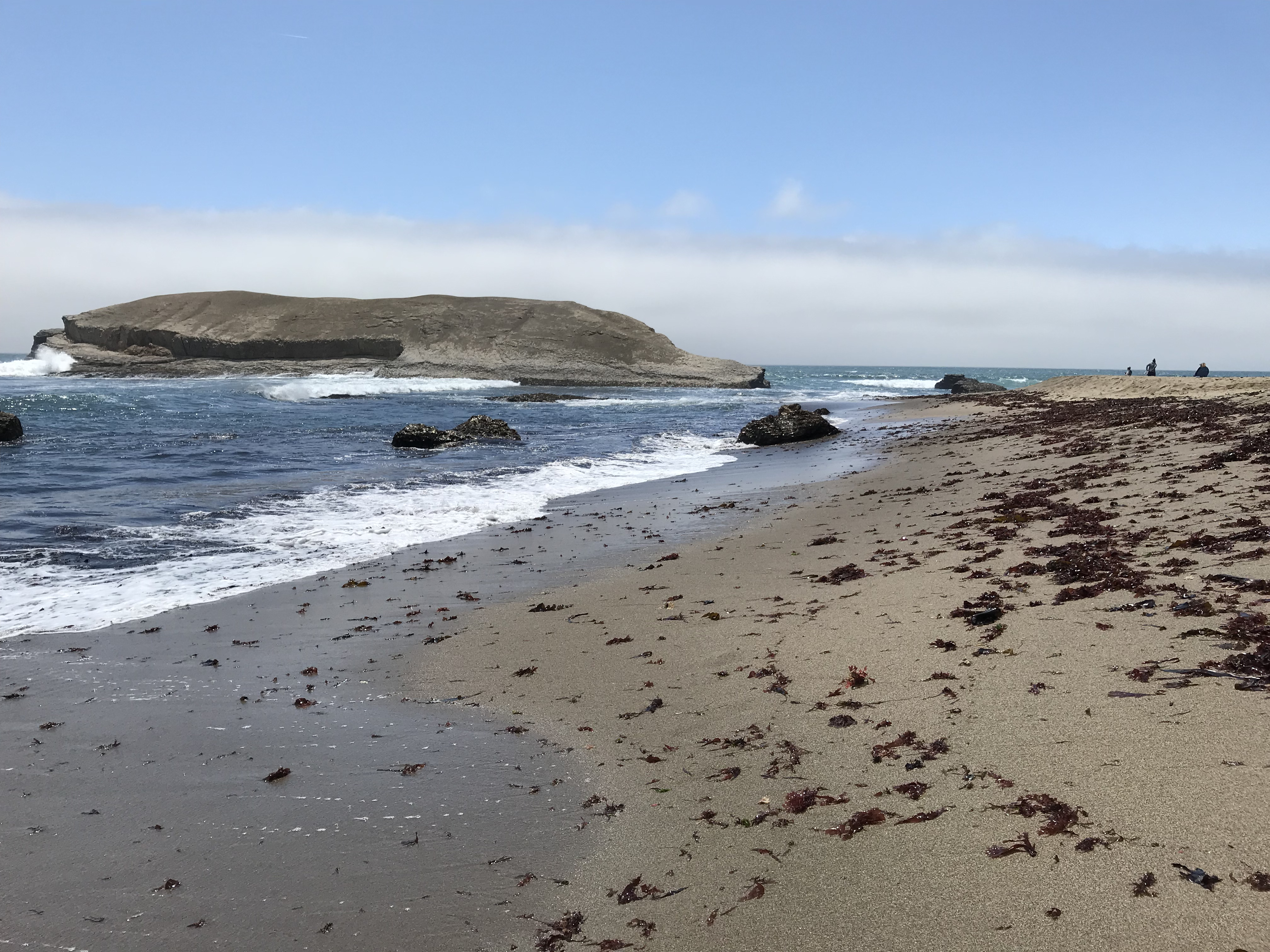
View of Greyhound Rock Beach, part of the SMCA

Greyhound Rock SMCA is adjacent to Ano Nuevo State Park. Año Nuevo State Marine Conservation Area adjoins the site to the north.

This marine protected area is bounded by the mean high tide line, the offshore boundary of 3 nautical miles (5.6 km) and straight lines connecting the following points in the order listed except where noted:

1. 37°04.70′N 122°16.20′W
2. 37°04.70′N 122°21.00′W
3. 37°03.55′N 122°21.00′W thence southward along the offshore boundary of 3 nautical miles (5.6 km) to
4. 37°02.57′N 122°19.10′W and
5. 37°02.57′N 122°14.00′W.

== Habitat and wildlife ==
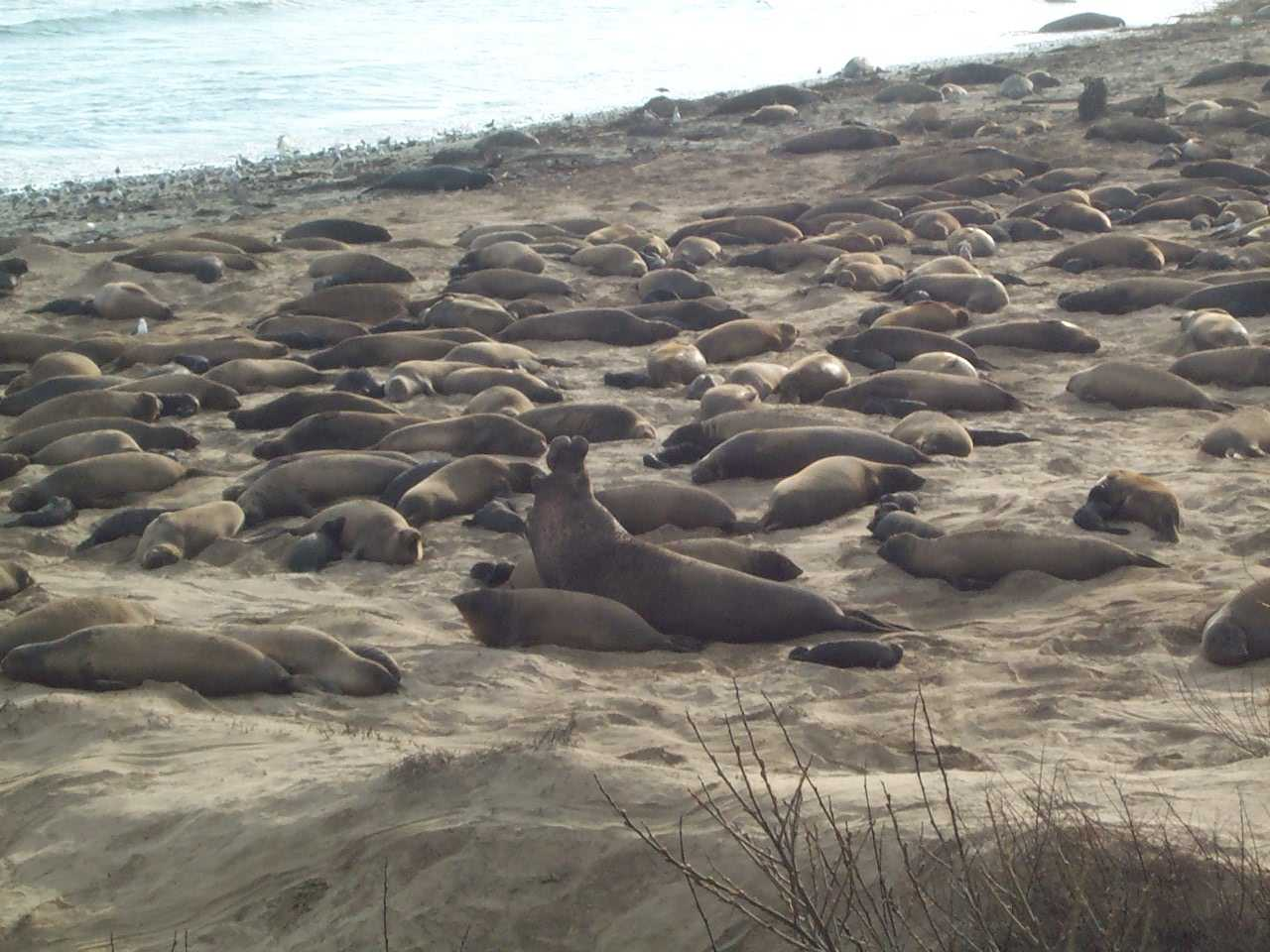
Elephant seals at Año Nuevo during the mating season in early February

Point Año Nuevo is used by thousands of breeding seabirds and marine mammals and supports a world-famous elephant seal haul out and breeding ground. The waters surrounding the point attract a concentration of great white sharks and include documented “hotspots” for depleted canary rockfish. Threatened marbled murrelets rest on shore and forage in the lee of the point.

Greyhound Rock SMCA provides habitat for a variety of marine life, and includes rocky intertidal, sandy beach, estuary, offshore rocks and islands, shale reef, bull kelp and giant kelp forest.

== Recreation and nearby attractions ==
The adjacent Ano Nuevo State Reserve and Ano Nuevo State Park have extensive docent programs (including docent lead tours to the elephant seal colony during the months of December through March in Ano Nuevo State Reserve), outreach and interpretive facilities, parking, and an on-site ranger presence to assist with management and enforcement.

California's marine protected areas encourage recreational and educational uses of the ocean. Activities such as kayaking, diving, snorkeling, and swimming are allowed unless otherwise restricted.

Public coastal access in the Greyhound Rock SMCA includes Greyhound Rock Beach and the northern edge of Scott's Creek Beach.

== Scientific monitoring ==
As specified by the Marine Life Protection Act, select marine protected areas along California's central coast are being monitored by scientists to track their effectiveness and learn more about ocean health. Similar studies in marine protected areas located off of the Santa Barbara Channel Islands have already detected gradual improvements in fish size and number.

Local scientific and educational institutions involved in the monitoring include Stanford University's Hopkins Marine Station, University of California Santa Cruz, Moss Landing Marine Laboratories and Cal Poly San Luis Obispo. Research methods include hook-and-line sampling, intertidal and scuba diver surveys, and the use of Remote Operated Vehicle (ROV) submarines.
