= Año Nuevo State Marine Conservation Area =

Marine protected area off California's central coast

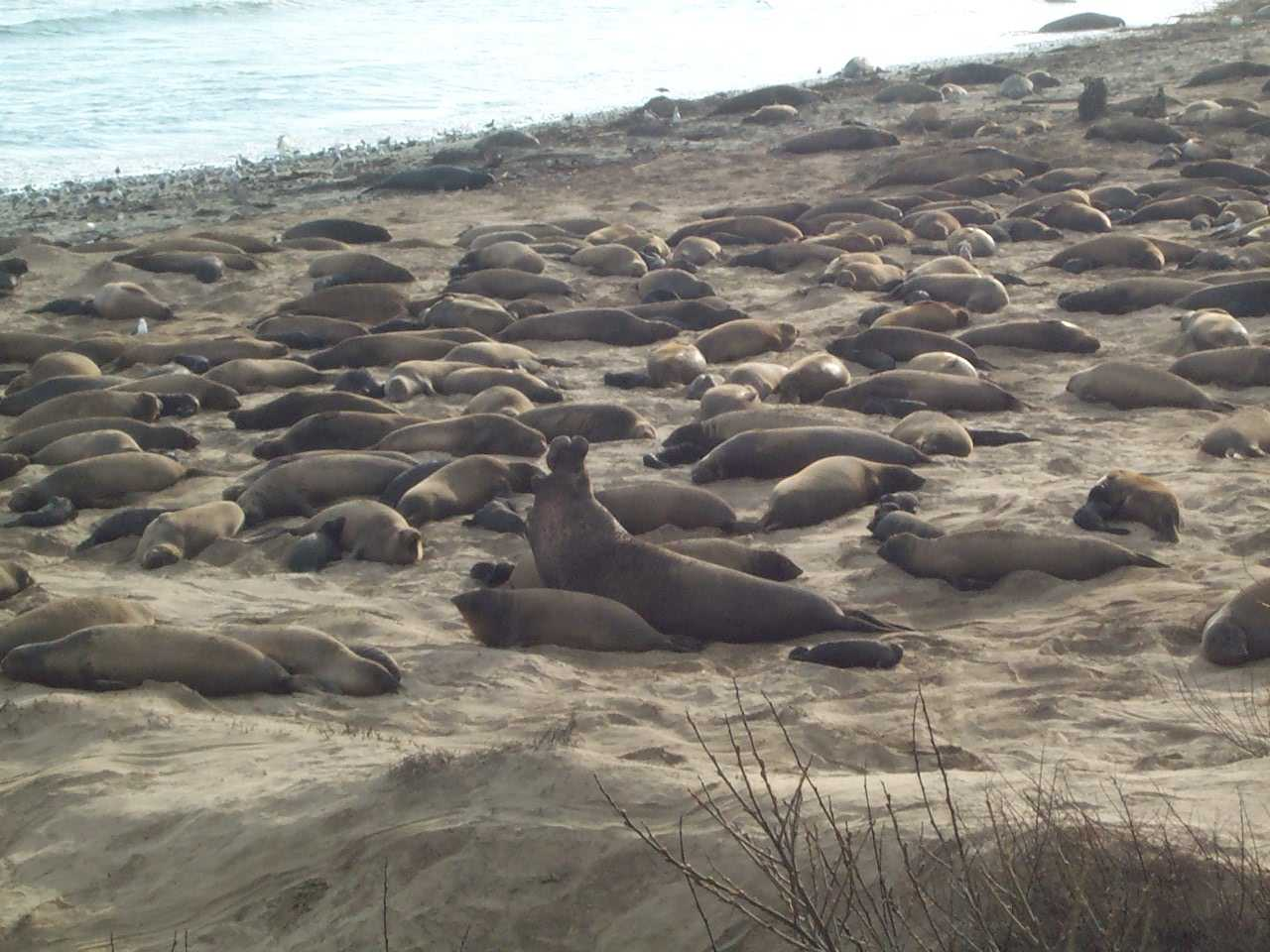
Elephant seals at Año Nuevo during the mating season in early February

Año Nuevo State Marine Conservation Area (SMCA) is one of two adjoining marine protected areas off the coast of San Mateo and Santa Cruz Counties, on California’s central coast. The area is approximately 55 miles (89 km) south of San Francisco. The SMCA has an area of 11.07 square miles (28.7 km^{2}). Except for limited taking of giant kelp, all living marine resources are protected.

== History ==
The Año Nuevo SMCA was established in September 2007 by the California Department of Fish and Game. It was one of 29 marine protected areas adopted during the first phase of the Marine Life Protection Act Initiative. The Marine Life Protection Act Initiative (or MLPAI) is a collaborative public process to create a statewide network of marine protected areas along the California coastline.

The SMCA was designed to protect marine life while keeping nearby favored recreational fishing grounds open to fishing. Important fishing grounds to the north of Point Año Nuevo and from Moss Landing to Davenport remain open to fishing.

== Geography and natural features ==
Año Nuevo SMCA is adjacent to Ano Nuevo State Park, and includes the waters surrounding Point Ano Nuevo and Ano Nuevo Island. Greyhound Rock State Marine Conservation Area adjoins the site to the south.

This marine protected area is bounded by the mean high tide line and a distance of 200 feet (61 m) seaward of mean lower low water between the following two points:

- 37°10.00′N 122°21.80′W and
- 37°08.70′N 122°21.00′W.

The area then continues southward bounded by the mean high tide line and straight lines connecting the following points in the order listed:

- 37°08.70′N 122°21.00′W
- 37°04.70′N 122°21.00′W and
- 37°04.70′N 122°16.20′W.

== Habitat and wildlife ==
Point Año Nuevo is used by thousands of breeding seabirds and marine mammals and supports a world famous elephant seal haul out and breeding ground. The waters surrounding the point attract a concentration of great white sharks and include documented “hotspots” for depleted canary rockfish. Threatened marbled murrelets rest on shore and forage in the lee of the point.

Ano Nuevo SMCA provides habitat for a variety of marine life, and includes rocky intertidal, sandy beach, estuary, offshore rocks and islands, shale reef, bull kelp and giant kelp forest.

== Recreation and nearby attractions ==
The adjacent State Parks have extensive docent programs (including docent lead tours to the elephant seal colony during the months of December through March in Ano Nuevo State Reserve), outreach and interpretive facilities, parking, and an on-site ranger presence to assist with management and enforcement.

California’s marine protected areas encourage recreational and educational uses of the ocean. Activities such as kayaking, diving, snorkeling, and swimming are allowed unless otherwise restricted.

== Scientific monitoring ==
As specified by the Marine Life Protection Act, select marine protected areas along California’s central coast are being monitored by scientists to track their effectiveness and learn more about ocean health. Similar studies in marine protected areas located off of the Santa Barbara Channel Islands have already detected gradual improvements in fish size and number.
