= Año Nuevo State Park =

State park in California, United States

- IUCN category III (natural monument or feature)
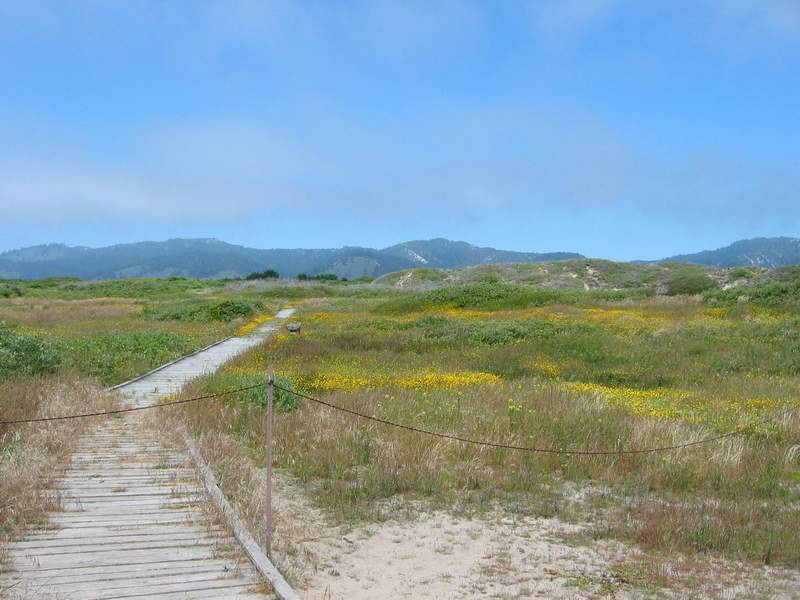
- Año Nuevo State Park
- Interactive map of Año Nuevo State Park
- Location: San Mateo County, California, United States
- Nearest city: Pescadero, California
- Coordinates: 37°7′59″N 122°19′59″W
- Area: 4,209 acres (17.03 km^{2})
- Established: 1985
- Governing body: California Department of Parks and Recreation

U.S. National Natural Landmark
- Designated: 1980

Año Nuevo State Park is a state park of California, United States, encompassing Año Nuevo Island and Año Nuevo Point, which are known for their pinniped rookeries. Located in San Mateo County, the low, rocky, windswept point juts out into the Pacific Ocean about 55 miles (89 km) south of San Francisco and the Golden Gate. Año Nuevo State Natural Reserve, formerly a separate unit of the California state park system, was merged into Año Nuevo State Park in October 2008. The coastal geographic center, or coastal-midpoint of California is located at the northern end of this park at 37°09′58″N 122°21′40″W, as the absolute geographic center of California falls at 37°09′58″N 119°26′58″W.

The reserve contains a diversity of plant communities, including old growth forest, freshwater marsh, red alder riparian forest and knobcone pine forest. Its four perennial streams support steelhead and coho salmon, and its wetlands are habitat to the rare San Francisco garter snake and California red-legged frog. Cultural resources include the remnants of a prehistoric Native American village site and a number of structures from the 19th century Cascade Ranch. In conjunction with adjacent and nearby public lands, the unit permits the protection of important regional ecological corridors.

The point remains undeveloped, much as Sebastián Vizcaíno saw it from his passing ship in 1603.

== History ==
The Quiroste Ohlone people were the first known to inhabit the Año Nuevo area. After Mission Santa Cruz was founded in 1791, the Quiroste population plunged due to the various diseases that the Spanish had brought with them.

The Spanish maritime explorer Sebastian Vizcaino sailed by the point on January 3, 1603. His diarist and chaplain of the expedition, Father Antonio de la Ascensión, named it Punta de Año Nuevo (New Year's Point) for the day on which they sighted it in 1603. They had recently stopped in Monterey and had passed Año Nuevo while heading north.

The first European land exploration of Alta California was the Spanish Portolà expedition of 1760–1770. Guided by Vizcaino's landmarks as it traveled north along the coast in 1769, the explorers recognized Point Año Nuevo. On the return journey to San Diego, the party camped at Año Nuevo Creek on November 19. Franciscan missionary Juan Crespi noted in his diary, "We...halted on a steep rock, in sight of the point which we judged to be Año Nuevo, on the bank of an arroyo which empties into the sea."

After the mid-19th century, developments occurred, including the development of Año Nuevo Island and agriculture in the surrounding region. Once home to a large population of northern elephant seals, hunters greatly reduced the seal population by overhunting the species. Since the mid-20th century, the seal population has had a rebound and multiplied greatly. Northern elephant seals can be seen today on the wildlife reserve.

Save the Redwoods League purchased a 564-acre (228 ha) parcel known as Cascade Creek in 2020 that links Año Nuevo with Big Basin Redwoods State Park.

== Pinniped colonies ==
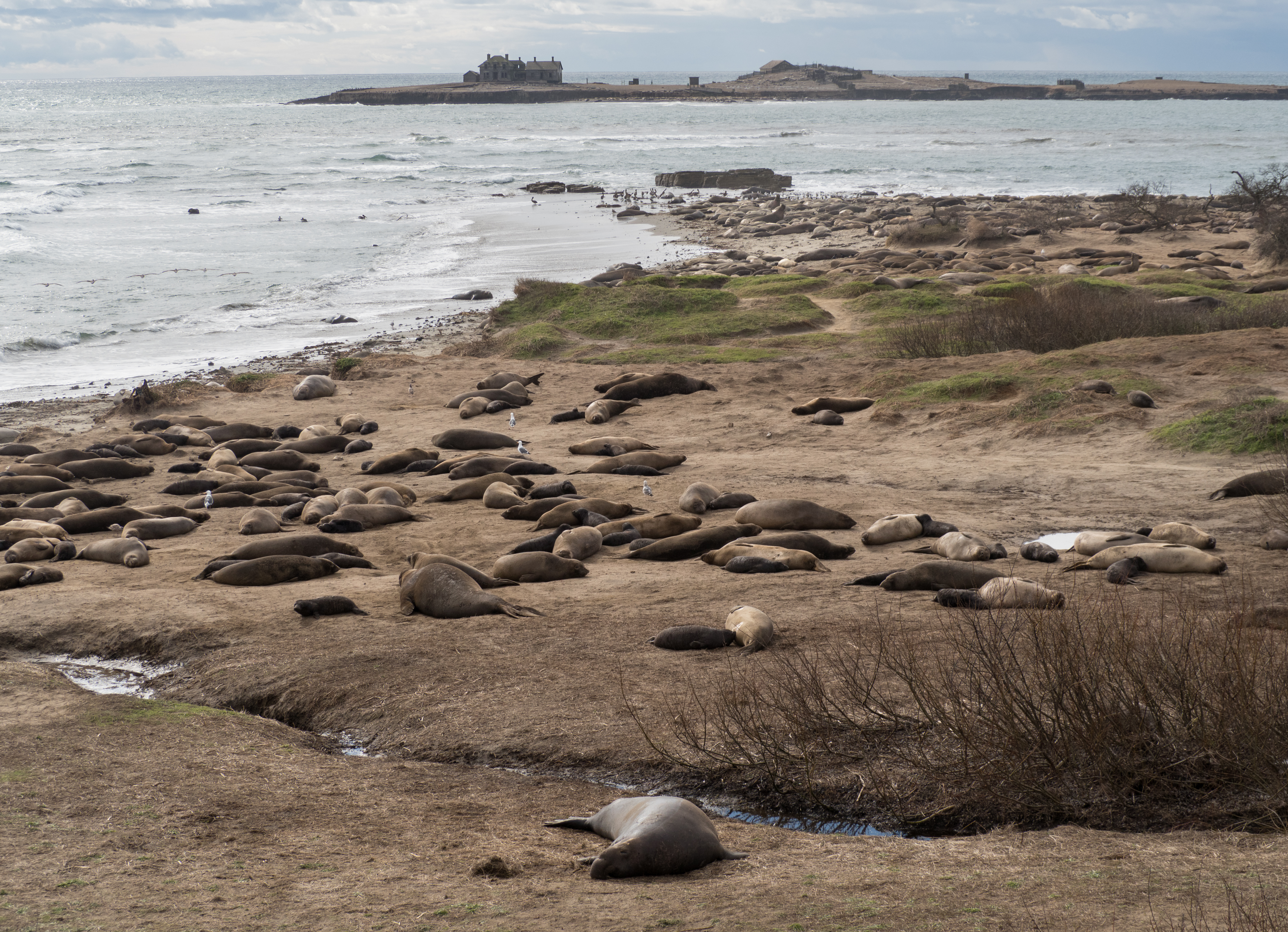
Northern elephant seal rookery on Ano Nuevo Point in February 2019.

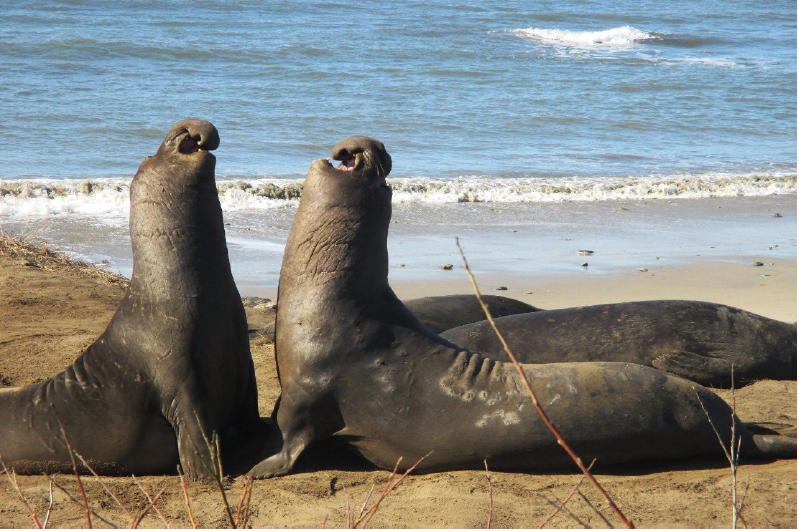
Two male northern elephant seals confront one another at the park.

Northern elephant seals, California sea lions, sea otters, and other marine mammals come ashore to rest, mate, and give birth in the sand dunes or on the beaches and offshore islands. Hundreds of thousands of people come to witness it each year.

Año Nuevo State Park is the site of one of the largest mainland breeding colonies for the northern elephant seal (another is in Piedras Blancas State Marine Reserve and Marine Conservation Area—100 miles (161 km) south near the town of Cambria and the San Simeon approach to Hearst Castle). The seals attract so much interest that early reservations are needed during the winter breeding season. The males battle for mates on the beaches and the females give birth to their pups on the dunes.

From mid-December through late March, daily access to the reserve is available on guided walks only. Most of the adult seals are gone by mid-March, leaving behind the weaned pups who remain through April. The elephant seals return to Año Nuevo's beaches during the spring (females) and summer (males) months to molt, and can be observed during this time through a permit system. Reservations for a guided walk during the breeding season are available by phone.

== Facilities ==
A Visitor Center features natural history exhibits and a bookstore offering educational items such as books, postcards and posters. Restrooms, drinking water and picnic tables are available near the Visitor Center only. Food and beverages are not sold at the reserve, although drinking water is available.

The parking lot is just west of California Route 1 at 37°7′10″N 122°18′25″W.

The former Cascade Ranch unit of the reserve includes steep unmarked hikes in the coastal hills inland of the highway.

== Adjacent attractions ==
Año Nuevo State Marine Conservation Area and Greyhound Rock State Marine Conservation Area are two adjoining marine protected areas off the coast of Año Nuevo State Park. Like underwater parks, these marine protected areas help conserve ocean wildlife and marine ecosystems.

Pigeon Point Light Station State Historic Park, Butano State Park and numerous other parks and beaches are within 5 miles (8 km) of Año Nuevo.

== See also ==
- The Marine Mammal Center
- List of beaches in California
- List of California state parks
