= La Brea Fire =

2009 wildfire in Southern California

- Part of the 2009 California wildfires
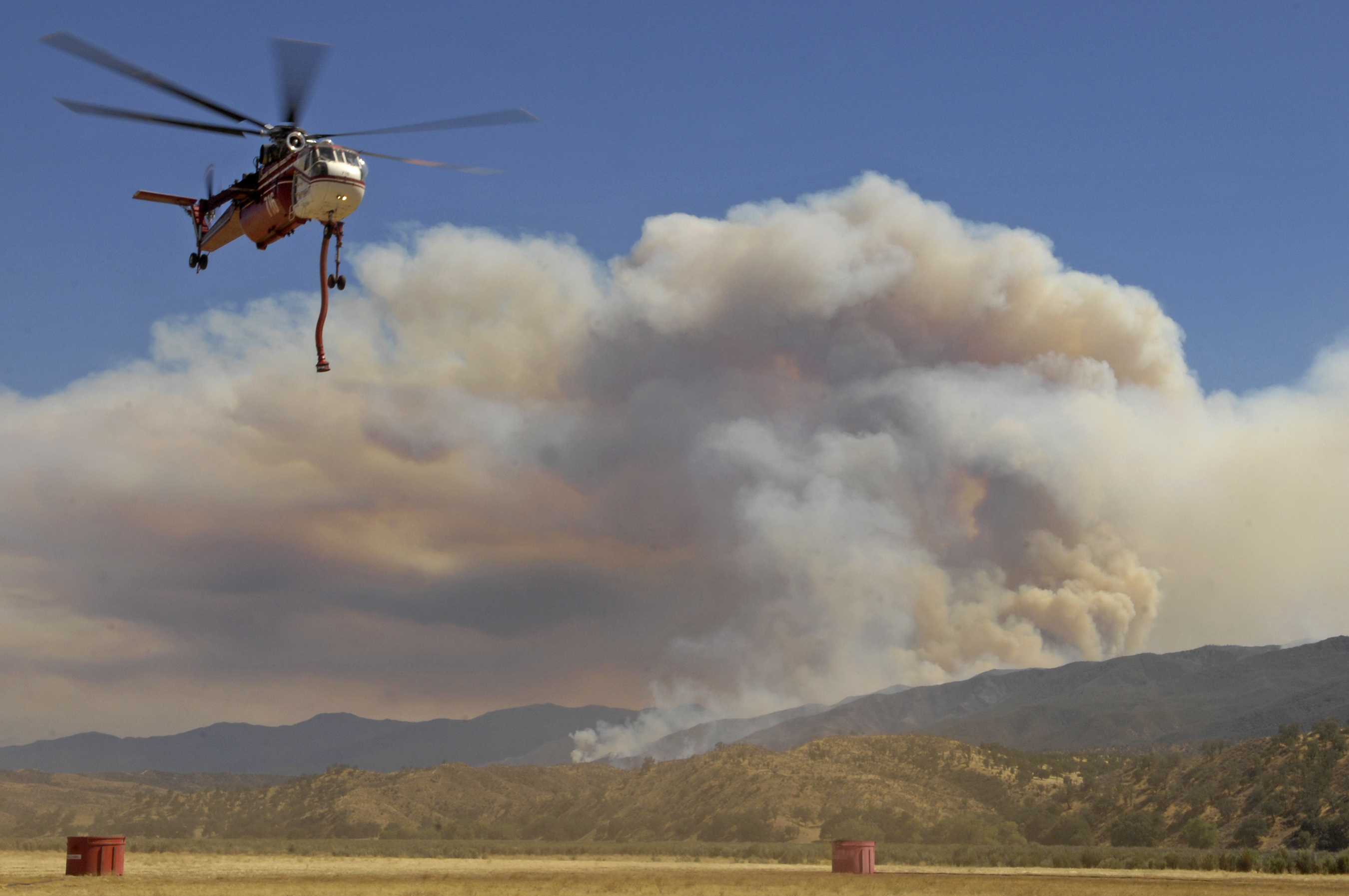
- An Ericcson Skycrane prepares to drop flame retardant on the La Brea Fire
- Date: August 8, 2009 –; August 22, 2009
- Location: Santa Barbara, California
- Coordinates: 34.95°N 119.978°W

Statistics
- Burned area: 89,489 acres (36,215 ha; 140 sq mi; 362 km^{2})

Impacts
- Structures lost: 2
- Cost: $34.9 million; (equivalent to about $49.4 million in 2024)

Ignition
- Cause: Cooking fire at an illegal marijuana growing operation

Map
- Location within southern California

The La Brea Fire was a fast-moving 2009 wildfire which occurred in Southern California in the United States. The fire began near La Brea Creek in Santa Barbara County, in the Los Padres National Forest. The fire started burning on August 8, and just 5 days later on August 13 had grown by 10,000 acres, or 40 km^{2}. When the wildfire was finally contained on August 22, it had burned 89,489 acres (140 sq. mi; 362 km^{2}.) of land. The huge Zaca Fire burned in the same region as the La Brea Fire, and occurred just two years prior in 2007.

== Progression ==
The fire was first reported on Saturday August 8, 2009 at 2:45 pm in the San Rafael Wilderness and grew to a size of 1,300 acres by nightfall. At the start, the fire was located 23 miles east of Santa Maria, and the containment operation was under the command of the leader of the California Interagency Incident Management Team 3, Jeanne Pincha-Tulley. The first step to their strategy to keep the fire contained was to first implement evacuations of people near the fire and to protect private property and homes. This allowed the fire to burn unattended in the San Rafael Wilderness. Once the private property was protected, the fire's growth in the wilderness began to stall, and the containment crew executed a direct attack plan. Helicopters dropped water on the fire, heavy air tankers dropped fire retardant, and hotshot crews operated on the ground. Mechanized equipment was used to cut down enough trees in the area to make places that helicopters could land.

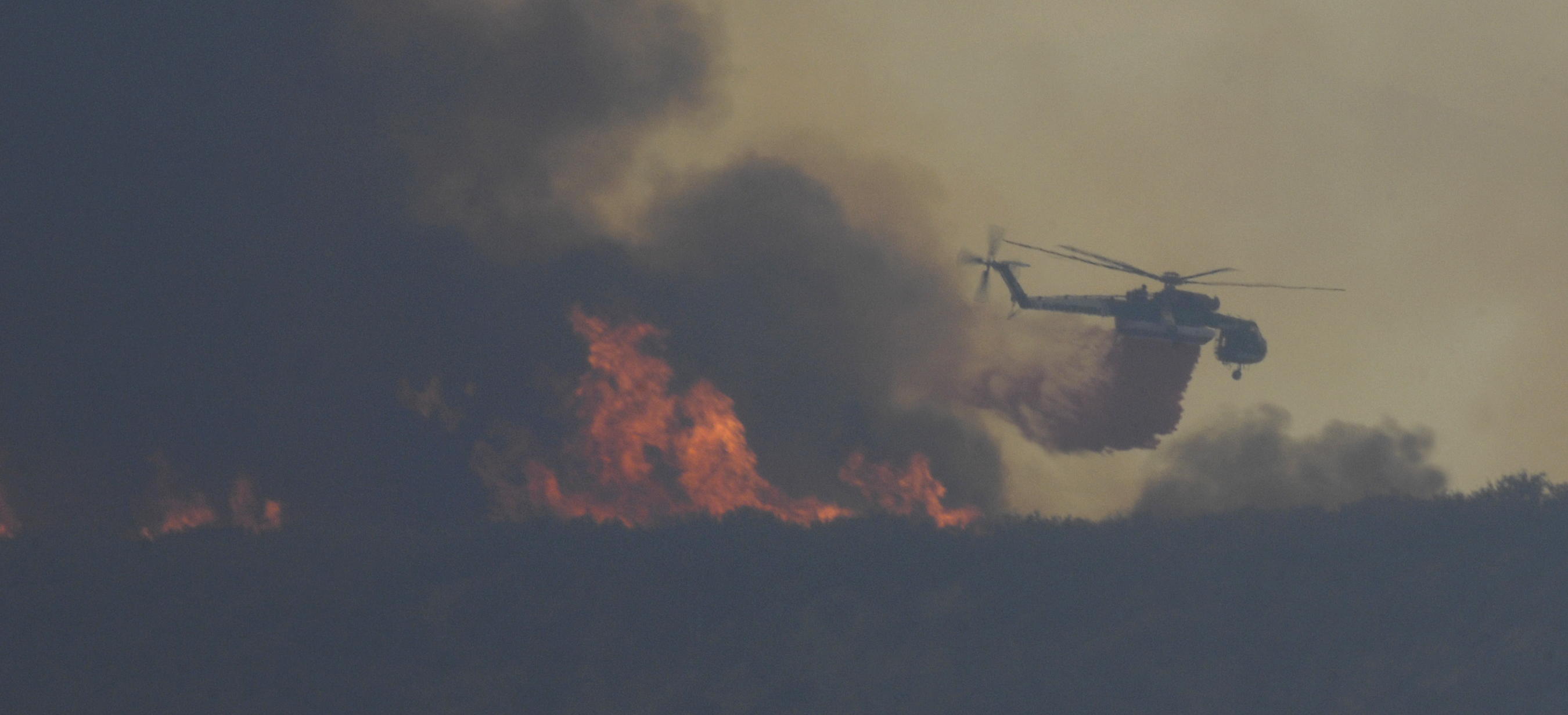
A S-64 Skycrane helicopter drops flame retardant on the fire

After two weeks of managing the fire this way, the fire was declared 100% contained at 6 pm on August 22, and management of the contained fire was passed off from California Interagency Management Team 3 to Central Coast Interagency Incident Management Team 7, headed by Incident Commander Jim Smith. At least 29 engines, 17 crews, 4 bulldozers, 56 water tenders, 5 aerial firefighting helicopters and 878 firefighters were deployed to fight the blaze. The total cost of the firefighting effort amounted to $34.9 million.

== Cause ==
After a week-long investigation on the part of United States Forest Service Special Agents, the Santa Barbara County Sheriff's Narcotics Unit and Fire Investigators announced that the cause of the La Brea Fire was linked to a cooking fire in a marijuana drug operation. The illegal drug operation was believed to be run by a Mexican National Drug Organization. The illegal marijuana garden where the illegal drug operation was conducted was left unburned by the La Brea Fire, and there were signs of it being occupied shortly before the fire started. Officials were able to find and secure this camp area, and believed that the culprits were still in the San Rafael Wilderness attempting to escape on foot. As they feared the criminals were nearby, the police warned local citizens not to approach suspicious looking individuals, but instead report them to law enforcement.

== See also ==
2009 California wildfires

- Jesusita Fire
- Lockeed Fire
- Station Fire
- Guiberson Fire
