= Rancho Agua Puerca y las Trancas =

Mexican land grant in California

Coordinates: 37.070°N 122.240°W

Rancho Agua Puerca y las Trancas was a 4,421-acre (17.89 km^{2}) Mexican land grant in present-day Santa Cruz County, California given in 1843 by Governor Manuel Micheltorena to Ramón Rodríguez and Francisco Alviso. "Agua Puerca" is a combination of "water" and "pork, or pig", and probably refers to the stagnant water in the lagoon formed at the outlet of the stream at Davenport Landing, the original southern boundary. "Las Trancas" means "the bars" (obstacles or difficulties) and may refer to the sand bars which naturally form at many California coastal creek outlets, forming stagnant lagoons just behind the beach.

The grant extended along the Pacific coast from Waddell Creek which formed the north boundary of the grant, south past present-day Swanton to the Arroyo Puerca just north of present-day Davenport. Scott Creek flows north-to-south for almost the entire length of the grant.

== History ==
The one square league grant was first made to Hilario Buelna in 1839, as Rancho del Jarro, but Buelna apparently forfeited his claim by failing to make any improvements. A new grant was made in 1843 made to brothers-in-law Ramón Rodríguez and Francisco Alviso. Ramón Rodríguez (1798–1876), brother of Sebastian Rodríguez of Rancho Bolsa del Pajaro, married Francisco Alviso's sister, Maria Rosa Alviso (1816–1890).

With the cession of California to the United States following the Mexican-American War, the 1848 Treaty of Guadalupe Hidalgo provided that the land grants would be honored. As required by the Land Act of 1851, a claim for Rancho Agua Puerca y las Trancas was filed with the Public Land Commission in 1852, and the grant was patented to Ramón Rodríguez and Francisco Alviso in 1867 (patent No. 206).

In 1846 Felipe Armas (1809–) married Maria Antonia Rodriguez, sister of Ramón Rodríguez. Marriage into this family enabled Felipe Armas to purchase Francisco Alviso's half of Rancho Agua Puerca y las Trancas in 1847.

In 1867, Rancho Agua Puerca y las Trancas was sold to James Archibald. Archibald arranged for a Swiss dairyman, Ambrogio Gianone, to run the dairy. Eventually, Gianone bought the north third of the rancho, which is now known as Gianone Hill. After Archibald died in 1875, his wife sold the remainder of the rancho to Joseph Bloom. The Swanton Pacific Ranch comprises much of the original Rancho Agua Puerca y Las Trancas.
