= Minimum-gauge railway =

Railway with a 15 inch track gauge

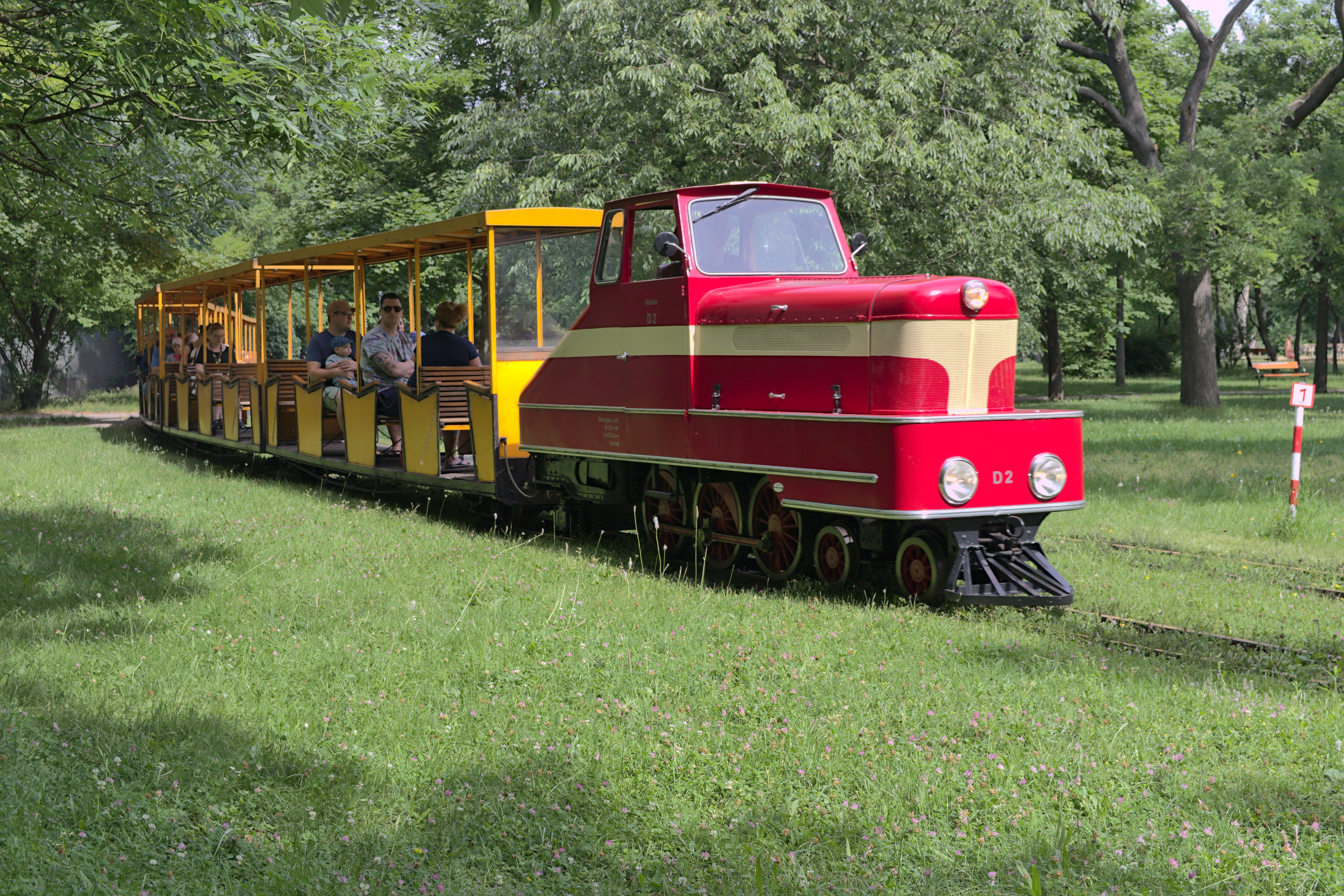
Liliputbahn at Vienna Prater amusement park

Minimum-gauge railways are railways with track gauges smaller than those of narrow-gauge railways, primarily designed for light, industrial, or tourist transportation. The most common gauges for minimum-gauge railways include:

- 15 in (381 mm)
- 400 mm (15 3/4 in)
- 16 in (406 mm)
- 18 in (457 mm)
- 19 in (483 mm)
- 500 mm (19 3/4 in)
- 20 in (508 mm)

These railways have been developed for applications such as estate transport, mining, agriculture, and amusement parks, offering an economical and adaptable solution for restricted environments.

== History ==
The term was originally conceived by Sir Arthur Percival Heywood, who used it in 1874 to describe the principle behind his Duffield Bank Railway, specifically its 15 in (381 mm) gauge, distinguishing it from a narrow-gauge railway. Having previously built a small railway of 9 in (229 mm) gauge, he settled on 15 in (381 mm) as the minimum that he felt was practical.

In general, minimum-gauge railways maximize their loading gauge, where the dimension of the equipment is made as large as possible with respect to the track gauge while still providing enough stability to keep it from tipping over. Standard-gauge railways have vehicles that are approximately twice, and in some cases nearly three times, the track gauge in width, but with minimum-gauge railways this can be as much as four times the width of the track as in some of the sugar cane railways of Australia. Minimum-gauge railways allowed for ease of mobility on battlefields, mines, and other restricted environments.

A number of 18 in (457 mm) gauge railways were built in Britain to serve ammunition depots and other military facilities, particularly during the First World War.

In South Australia the Semaphore to Fort Glanville Conservation Park includes a steam engine service that runs on an 18 in (457 mm) track.

In France, Decauville produced a range of portable track railways running on 400 mm (15 3/4 in) and 500 mm (19 3/4 in) tracks, most commonly in restricted environments such as underground mine railways, parks and farms.

During World War II, it was proposed to expedite the Yunnan–Burma Railway using 400 mm (15 3/4 in) gauge, since such a small gauge can have the tightest of curves in difficult terrain.

== Distinction between ridable miniature and minimum-gauge railway ==
The major distinction between a miniature railway (US: 'riding railroad' or 'grand scale railroad') and a minimum-gauge railway is that miniature lines use models of full-sized prototypes. There are miniature railways that run on gauges as wide as 2 ft (610 mm), for example the Wicksteed Park Railway. There are also rideable miniature railways running on extremely narrow tracks as small as 10 1/4 in (260 mm) gauge, for example the Rudyard Lake Steam Railway. Around the world there are also several rideable miniature railways open to the public using even narrower gauges, such as 7 1/4 in (184 mm) and 7 1/2 in (190.5 mm).

Generally minimum-gauge railways have a working function as estate railways, or industrial railways, or providers of public transport links; although most have a distinct function in relation to tourism, and depend upon tourism for the revenue to support their working function.

== Railways ==
Name	Gauge	Country	Location	Notes
381 mm (15 in)
See Fifteen-inch gauge railway	15 in (381 mm)			
Prater Liliputbahn	15 in (381 mm)	Austria	Prater Park, Vienna, Austria	
Romney, Hythe & Dymchurch Railway	15 in (381 mm)	(United Kingdom) UK	Kent, United kingdom	
The Valley Railway Adventure (Formerly the Evesham Vale Light Railway))	15 in (381 mm)	(United Kingdom) UK	Evesham Country Park, Worcestershire	
Whistlestop Valley (Formerly Kirklees Light Railway)	15 in (381 mm)	(United Kingdom) UK	Kirklees, West Yorkshire	
Bure Valley Railway	15 in (381 mm)	(United Kingdom) UK	Aylsham to Wroxham, Norfolk	
400 mm (15 3/4 in)
Rufisque tramway	400 mm (15 3/4 in)	France		
16 in (406 mm)
Candy Cane Express	16 in (406 mm)	Canada	Santa's Village Family Entertainment Park, Bracebridge, Ontario	Replica diesel locomotive with passenger cars, working as amusement park ride
Alamogordo/Alameda Park Narrow Gauge Railway	16 in (406 mm)	(United States) US	The Toy Train Depot, Alamogordo, New Mexico	
Balboa Park Miniature Railroad	16 in (406 mm)	(United States) US	Balboa Park (San Diego), San Diego, California	
Cedar Rock Railroad	16 in (406 mm)	(United States) US	Leander, Texas	
Chippewa Valley Railroad	16 in (406 mm)	(United States) US	Carson Park (Eau Claire, Wisconsin), Eau Claire, Wisconsin	
Lakeland Amusement Park	16 in (406 mm)	(United States) US	Lakeland, Tennessee	Defunct
Little Florida Railroad	16 in (406 mm)	(United States) US	Central Florida Zoo & Botanical Gardens, Sanford, Florida	Closed
Michigan AuSable Valley Railroad	16 in (406 mm)	(United States) US	Fairview, Michigan	Defunct as of November, 2017
Old Smokey Train	16 in (406 mm)	(United States) US	Knoebels Amusement Resort, Elysburg, Pennsylvania	
Pinconning and Blind River Railroad	16 in (406 mm)	(United States) US	Fairview, Michigan (1953–1973)	
Pioneer Train	16 in (406 mm)	(United States) US	Knoebels Amusement Resort, Elysburg, Pennsylvania	
Salt Mine Express	16 in (406 mm)	(United States) US	Strataca Salt Mine Adventure, Hutchinson, Kansas, 650 feet underground	
Schnepf Farms	16 in (406 mm)	(United States) US	Schnepf Frams, Queen Creek. Arizona	
Smokey Joe Railroad	16 in (406 mm)	(United States) US	Eastern Shore Threshermen & Collectors Association, Federalsburg, Maryland	
Travel Town Railroad	16 in (406 mm)	(United States) US	Travel Town Museum, Los Angeles, California	
Whiskey River Railway	16 in (406 mm)	(United States) US	Little Amerricka, Marshall, Wisconsin	
16 1/2 in (419 mm)
Island Park Railway	16 1/2 in (419 mm)	Canada	Woodstock, New Brunswick	
18 in (457 mm)
National Railway Museum	18 in (457 mm)	Australia	Port Adelaide, South Australia	
Semaphore & Fort Glanville Tourist Railway	18 in (457 mm)	Australia	Semaphore, South Australia	Operated by the National Railway Museum, Port Adelaide
Aotea Railway	18 in (457 mm)	New Zealand	Aotea Lagoon, Porirua	
Bicton Woodland Railway	18 in (457 mm)	(United Kingdom) UK	United Kingdom	
Heath Park Tramway	455 mm (17 15/16 in); 18 in (457 mm)	(United Kingdom) UK	Cardiff	
Royal Arsenal Railway	18 in (457 mm)	(United Kingdom) UK		
Sand Hutton Light Railway	18 in (457 mm)	(United Kingdom) UK		
Steeple Grange Light Railway	18 in (457 mm)	(United Kingdom) UK		
Sundown Adventure Land	18 in (457 mm)	(United Kingdom) UK	Retford, Nottinghamshire	
Terrific Train	18 in (457 mm)	(United Kingdom) UK	New Metroland, Gateshead, Tyne & Wear	
Billy Jones Wildcat Railroad	18 in (457 mm)	(United States) US	Oak Meadows Park and Vasona Park, Los Gatos, California	
Collegeville and Southern Railway	18 in (457 mm)	(United States) US		
Fidalgo City and Anacortes Railway	18 in (457 mm)	(United States) US		
Meadows and Lake Kathleen Railroad	18 in (457 mm)	(United States) US		
Venice Miniature Railway	18 in (457 mm)	(United States) US	Venice Beach, California	1943–1968
18 1/2 in (470 mm)
Griffith Park & Southern Railroad	18 1/2 in (470 mm)	(United States) US	Griffith Park, Los Angeles, California	
19 in (483 mm)
Swanton Pacific Railroad	19 in (483 mm)	(United States) US	Swanton Pacific Ranch, Swanton, California	Defunct since 2020
500 mm (19 3/4 in)
Southern Fuegian Railway	500 mm (19 3/4 in)	Argentina		
Geriatriezentrum am Wienerwald Feldbahn	500 mm (19 3/4 in)	Austria		
Chemin de Fer Touristique du Tarn	500 mm (19 3/4 in)	France		
Jardin d'Acclimatation railway	500 mm (19 3/4 in)	France		
Petit train d'Artouste	500 mm (19 3/4 in)	France		
20 in (508 mm)
Ledesma Mill Railway	20 in (508 mm)	Argentina	Province of Jujuy	Partially 20 in
Stanley Park Miniature Railway	20 in (508 mm)	Canada	Stanley Park, Vancouver, British Columbia	
North Bay Railway	20 in (508 mm)	(United Kingdom) UK	Scarborough, North Yorkshire	
Shipley Glen Tramway	20 in (508 mm)	(United Kingdom) UK		
Woburn Safari Park	20 in (508 mm)	(United Kingdom) UK		
Coronado Railroad	20 in (508 mm)	(United States) US	Chase Creek	
Huff Puff and Whistle Railroad	20 in (508 mm)	(United States) US	Story Land, Glen, New Hampshire	
Krasnoyarsk Child Railway	20 in (508 mm)	Russia	Central Park, Krasnoyarsk	
21 in (533 mm)
Pleasure Beach Express	21 in (533 mm)	(United Kingdom) UK	Blackpool, Lancashire	
1 ft 10 in (559 mm)
Little Puffer Miniature Steam Train	1 ft 10 in (559 mm)	(United States) US	San Francisco Zoo, San Francisco, California	
1 ft 10 3/4 in (578 mm)
Orient Express	1 ft 10 3/4 in (578 mm)	(United States) US	Lakeside Amusement Park, Denver, Colorado	

== Large amusement railways ==
Name	Gauge	Country	Location	Notes
Park Railway Maltanka	600 mm (1 ft 11 5/8 in)	Poland	Poznań	Śródka Roundabout - New Zoo, 2.4 miles (3.9 km), 4 stops
Narrow Gauge Railway Museum in Wenecja	600 mm (1 ft 11 5/8 in)	Poland	Wenecja	Wenecja - Biskupin, ~8 miles (13 km), 5 stops
Assiniboine Park R.R.	2 ft (610 mm)	Canada	Winnipeg, Manitoba	
Centreville Train	2 ft (610 mm)	Canada	Centreville Amusement Park, Toronto, Canada	One replica steam locomotive with tender, five passenger cars
Greater Vancouver Zoo Railway	2 ft (610 mm)	Canada	Greater Vancouver Zoo, Aldergrove, British Columbia	Has two stations, stops only at one station
Riverview Park Railway	2 ft (610 mm)	Canada	Riverview Park & Zoo, Peterborough, Ontario	
Wildlife Express	2 ft (610 mm)	Canada	BC Wildlife Park, Kamloops, British Columbia	
Park Railway	2 ft (610 mm)	(United Kingdom) UK	Alton Towers Park	Defunct 1953–1996
Wicksteed Park Railway	2 ft (610 mm)	(United Kingdom) UK	Wicksteed Park, Kettering, Northamptonshire	
Bayou Le Zoo Choo Choo	2 ft (610 mm)	(United States) US	Alexandria Zoological Park, Alexandria, Louisiana	
Casey Jr. Circus Train	2 ft (610 mm)	(United States) US	Disneyland, Anaheim, California	
Century Flyer	2 ft (610 mm)	(United States) US	Conway Human Development Center, Conway, Arkansas	
C.P. Huntington No. 3	2 ft (610 mm)	(United States) US	Pullen Park, Raleigh, North Carolina	
Emerson Zooline Railroad	2 ft (610 mm)	(United States) US	Saint Louis Zoo, St. Louis, Missouri	
Forest Park Miniature Railroad	2 ft (610 mm)	(United States) US	Fort Worth, Texas	
Gatorland Express	2 ft (610 mm)	(United States) US	Gatorland, Orlando, Florida	
Grand Sierra Railroad	2 ft (610 mm)	(United States) US	Knott's Berry Farm, Buena Park, California	
Hermann Park Railroad	2 ft (610 mm)	(United States) US	Hermann Park, Houston, Texas	Two miles (3.2 km) of track, three stops
Kennedy Express	2 ft (610 mm)	(United States) US	Kennedy Park (Hayward, California), Hayward, California	
Oregon Pacific Railroad	2 ft (610 mm)	(United States) US	Oaks Amusement Park, Portland, Oregon	
San Antonio Zoo Eagle	2 ft (610 mm)	(United States) US	Brackenridge Park, San Antonio, Texas	
Tauber Family Railroad	2 ft (610 mm)	(United States) US	Detroit Zoo, Royal Oak, Michigan	Donated by The Detroit News about 1931 and also supported by Chrysler Motors, zoo patrons and fares
Turtle Back Junction	2 ft (610 mm)	(United States) US	Turtle Back Zoo, West Orange, New Jersey	Two C.P. Huntington Trains
Van Saun Park Railroad	2 ft (610 mm)	(United States) US	Paramus, New Jersey	Three Allan Herschell S-24 2 ft (610 mm) narrow-gauge Iron Horse trains
Zoo Train	2 ft (610 mm)	(United States) US	Santa Barbara Zoo, Santa Barbara, California	
Zoofari Express	2 ft (610 mm)	(United States) US	Museum of Life and Science, Durham, North Carolina	
BuJu Line	2 ft 6 in (762 mm)	(United States) US	Burke Junction, Cameron Park, California	
Fort Wilderness Railroad	2 ft 6 in (762 mm)	(United States) US	Walt Disney World, Bay Lake, Florida	Defunct
Mine Train Through Nature's Wonderland	2 ft 6 in (762 mm)	(United States) US	Disneyland, Anaheim, California	Defunct
Omaha Zoo Railroad	2 ft 6 in (762 mm)	(United States) US	Henry Doorly Zoo and Aquarium, Omaha, Nebraska	
Viewliner Train of Tomorrow	2 ft 6 in (762 mm)	(United States) US	Disneyland, Anaheim, California	Defunct
Washington Park & Zoo Railway	2 ft 6 in (762 mm)	(United States) US	Washington Park (Portland, Oregon), Portland, Oregon	
Disneyland Railroad (Paris)	3 ft (914 mm)	France	Disneyland Park (Paris), Paris	
Disneyland Railroad	3 ft (914 mm)	(United States) US	Disneyland, Anaheim, California	The two original locomotives are 5:8-scale models of a full-size standard gauge locomotive.

== See also ==
- Children's railway
- Decauville
- Feldbahn
- Heritage railway
- Industrial railway
- Light railway
- List of British heritage and private railways
- List of British private narrow-gauge railways
- List of track gauges
- Narrow gauge railway
- Rail transport in Walt Disney Parks and Resorts
- Rail transport modelling scales
- Ridable miniature railway
- Trench railway
- Museum visitor attractions

== Bibliography ==
- Broggie, Michael (2014). Walt Disney's Railroad Story: The Small-Scale Fascination That Led to a Full-Scale Kingdom (4th ed.). The Donning Company Publishers. ISBN 978-1-57864-914-3.
- Clayton, H. (1968). The Duffield Bank and Eaton Railways. Oakwood Press. ISBN 0-85361-034-7.
- Heywood, Arthur Percival (1974) [1898]. Minimum Gauge Railways (3rd ed.). Turntable Publications. ISBN 0-902844-26-1.
- Household, Humphrey (1989). Narrow Gauge Railways: England and the Fifteen Inch. Sutton Publishing. ISBN 0862995752.
- Mosley, David; van Zeller, Peter (1986). Fifteen Inch Gauge Railways. Newton Abbot: David & Charles. ISBN 0-7153-8694-8.
- Smithers, Mark (1995). Sir Arthur Heywood and the Fifteen Inch Gauge Railway. Plateway Press. ISBN 1-871980-22-4.
