= 2009 California wildfires =

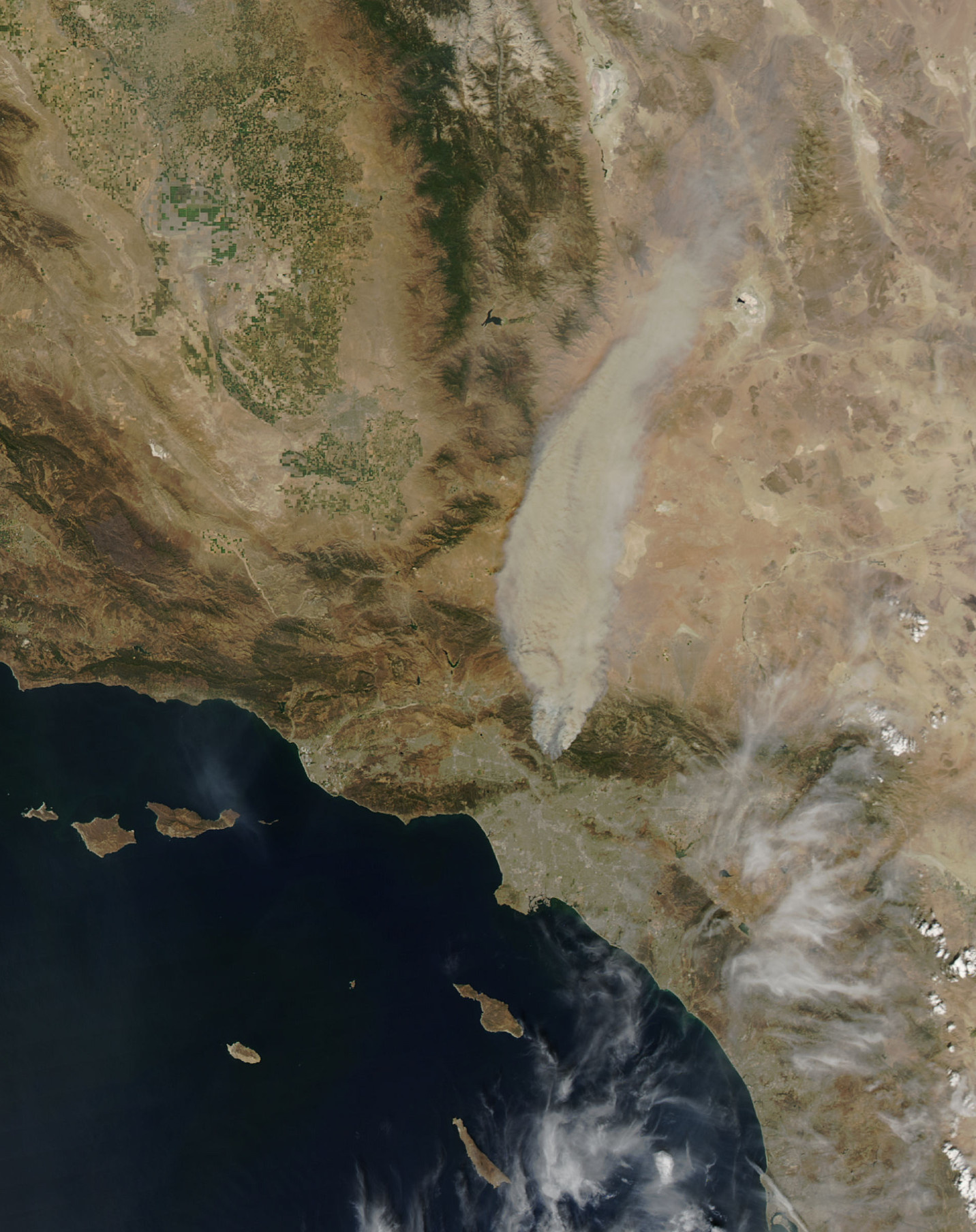
- Detail from a MODIS satellite image of the Station Fire, on August 29, 2009.

Statistics
- Total fires: 9,159
- Total area: 422,147 acres (1,708.37 km^{2})

Impacts
- Deaths: 4 firefighters
- Injuries: At least 134
- Cost: >$307.4 million (2009 USD)

9,158 wildfires were active in the US state of California during 2009. The fires burned more than 422,147 acres (660 mi^{2}; 1,708 km^{2}) of land from early February through late November, due to Red Flag conditions, destroying hundreds of structures, injuring 134 people, and killing four. The wildfires also caused at least US$134.48 million in damage. Although the fires burned many different regions of California in August, the month was especially notable for several very large fires which burned in Southern California, despite being outside of the normal fire season for that region.

The Station Fire, north of Los Angeles, was the largest and deadliest of these wildfires. It began in late August, and resulted in the devastation of 160,577 acres (251 mi^{2}; 650 km^{2}) of land as well as the death of two firefighters. Another large fire was the La Brea Fire, which burned nearly 90,000 acres (141 mi^{2}; 364 km^{2}) in Santa Barbara County earlier in the month. A state of emergency was also declared for the 7,800-acre (12 mi^{2}; 32 km^{2}) Lockheed Fire in Santa Cruz County, to the north.

== Background ==
The timing of "fire season" in California is variable, depending on the amount of prior winter and spring precipitation, the frequency and severity of weather such as heat waves and wind events, and moisture content in vegetation. Northern California typically sees wildfire activity between late spring and early fall, peaking in the summer with hotter and drier conditions. Occasional cold frontal passages can bring wind and lightning. The timing of fire season in Southern California is similar, peaking between late spring and fall. The severity and duration of peak activity in either part of the state is modulated in part by weather events: downslope/offshore wind events can lead to critical fire weather, while onshore flow and Pacific weather systems can bring conditions that hamper wildfire growth.

== List of wildfires ==
Below is a list of all fires that exceeded 1,000 acres (4.0 km^{2}) during the 2009 fire season. The list is taken from CAL FIRE's list of large fires.

Name	County	Acres	Km^{2}	Start date	Contained Date (Note: Containment means that fire crews have established and secured control lines around the fire's perimeter. These lines are artificial barriers, like trenches or cleared vegetation, designed to stop the fire's spread, or natural barriers like rivers. Containment reflects progress in managing the fire but does not necessarily mean the fire is starved of fuel, under control, or put out.)	Notes
Jesusita	Santa Barbara	8,733	35.3	May 5, 2009	May 20, 2009	160 structures destroyed
Grouse	Mariposa	3,047	12.3	May 30, 2009	July 13, 2009	
Harden	Tuolumne	1,661	6.7	June 8, 2009	July 11, 2009	
Explosive	San Joaquin	2,163	8.8	June 19, 2009	June 19, 2009	
Lion Complex	Tulare	3,988	16.1	June 30, 2009	August 21, 2009	
Backbone	Trinity	6,324	25.6	July 1, 2009	July 24, 2009	1 fatality
Yankee	San Diego	2,200	8.9	July 11, 2009	July 14, 2009	
Fork	Inyo	3,268	13.2	July 18, 2009	July 27, 2009	
Tennant	Siskiyou	3,225	13.1	July 19, 2009	July 27, 2009	
Knight	Tuolumne	6,130	24.8	July 26, 2009	August 11, 2009	
Wildcat	Tuolumne	1,100	4.5	July 29, 2009	August 31, 2009	
Hat Creek Complex	Shasta	11,269	45.6	August 1, 2009	August 12, 2009	
W-4	Lassen	1,500	6.1	August 1, 2009	August 7, 2009	
Dodge Complex	Lassen	1,600	6.5	August 1, 2009	August 3, 2009	
Brown	Shasta	1,000	4.0	August 2, 2009	August 12, 2009	
Fairfield	Shasta	1,664	6.7	August 2, 2009	August 21, 2009	
Chalk (Shu Complex)	Shasta	6,895	27.9	August 3, 2009	August 16, 2009	
Goose (Shu Complex)	Shasta	3,918	15.9	August 3, 2009	August 17, 2009	
Cassel (Shu Complex)	Shasta	6,319	25.6	August 3, 2009	August 14, 2009	
La Brea	Santa Barbara	89,489	362.1	August 8, 2009	August 23, 2009	2 structures destroyed
Lockheed	Santa Cruz	7,817	31.6	August 12, 2009	August 23, 2009	13 structures destroyed
Coffin	Trinity	1,300	5.3	August 12, 2009	August 15, 2009	
Corral	San Joaquin	12,200	49.4	August 13, 2009	August 16, 2009	
Yuba	Yuba	3,891	15.7	August 14, 2009	August 24, 2009	
Red Rock	Siskiyou	1,364	5.5	August 21, 2009	September 4, 2009	
Morris	Los Angeles	2,168	8.8	August 25, 2009	September 3, 2009	
Bryson	Monterey	3,383	13.7	August 25, 2009	August 29, 2009	
Station	Los Angeles	160,577	649.8	August 26, 2009	October 16, 2009	209 structures destroyed; 2 firefighter fatalities
Big Meadows	Mariposa	7,425	30.0	August 26, 2009	September 10, 2009	
Gloria	Monterey	6,437	26.0	August 27, 2009	September 1, 2009	
Cottonwood	Riverside	2,409	9.7	August 27, 2009	August 31, 2009	
Pacheco	Santa Clara	1,600	6.5	August 29, 2009	August 30, 2009	
Oak Glen III	San Bernardino	1,159	4.7	August 30, 2009	September 8, 2009	
Oasis	Lake	1,500	6.1	September 7, 2009	September 12, 2009	
Guiberson	Ventura	17,500	70.8	September 22, 2009	October 1, 2009	
Six	Yolo	1,235	5.0	October 1, 2009	October 1, 2009	
Sheep	San Bernardino	7,128	28.8	October 3, 2009	October 10, 2009	
Mill Creek #4	Humboldt	2,750	11.1	October 7, 2009	October 17, 2009	

== Weather conditions ==
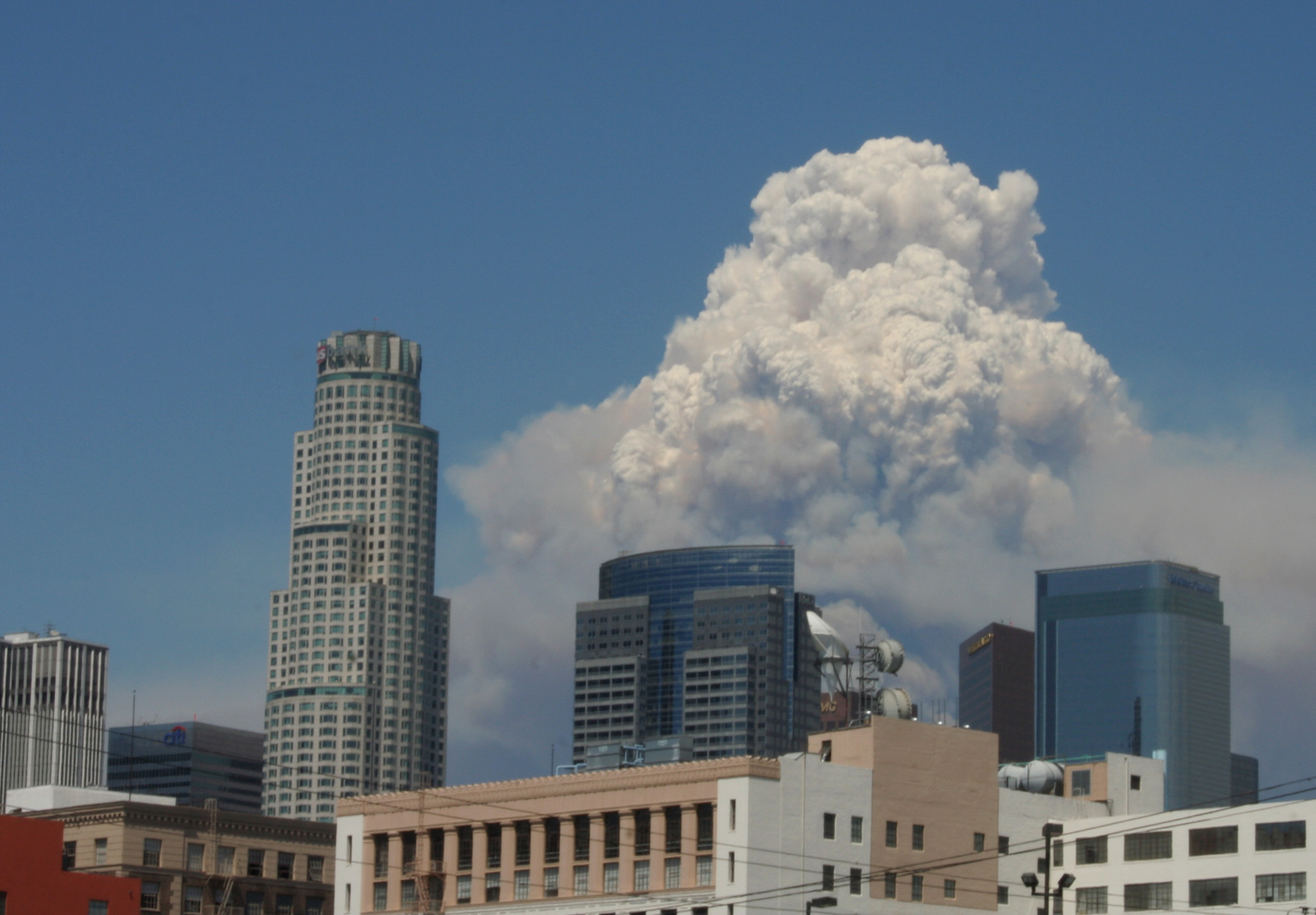
Pyrocumulus cloud from the Station Fire towers over the skyline of downtown Los Angeles, California.

Invasive, non-native vegetation dies and re-sprouts year after year creating an unnatural buildup of dead plant material. While periodic fires are natural, and many native plants depend upon fire to reproduce; the intensity and frequency of these fires is altered by the presence of non-natives.

In Southern California, the normal wildfire season begins in October, with the arrival of the infamous Santa Ana winds, and it is unusual to see fires spread so rapidly during other times of year. However, temperatures throughout the southern part of the state exceeded 100 °F (38 °C) for much of late August. The combination of high temperatures, low humidity and a large quantity of tinder-dry fuel, some of which had not burnt for decades, allowed some of the normal fires to quickly explode out of control despite the lack of winds to spread the flames. These conditions, along with extreme terrain in many undeveloped areas that slowed access to burn areas, made firefighting difficult.

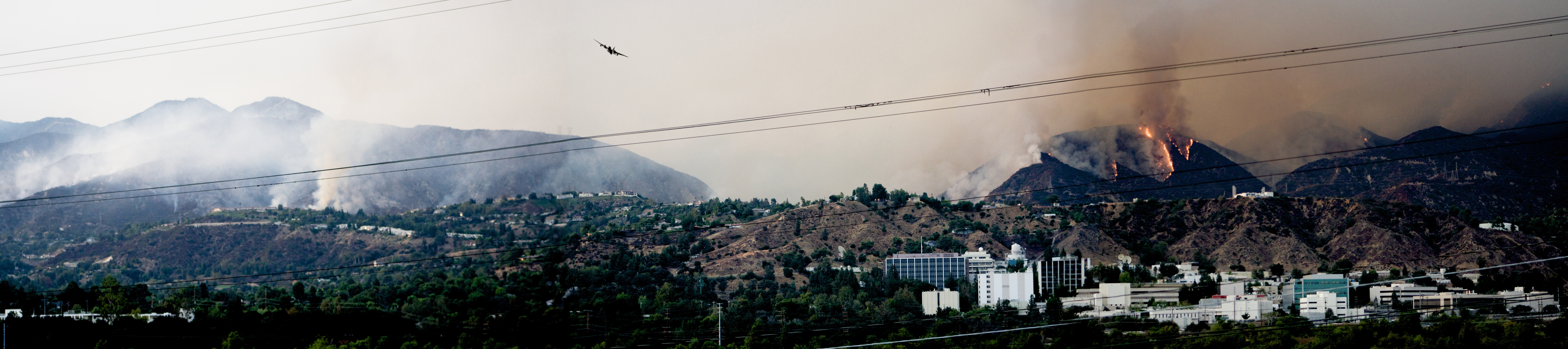
2009 California Wildfires at NASA/JPL showing the tinder-dry fuel being quickly consumed and aerial firefighting efforts to stop the blaze.

== Notable fires ==
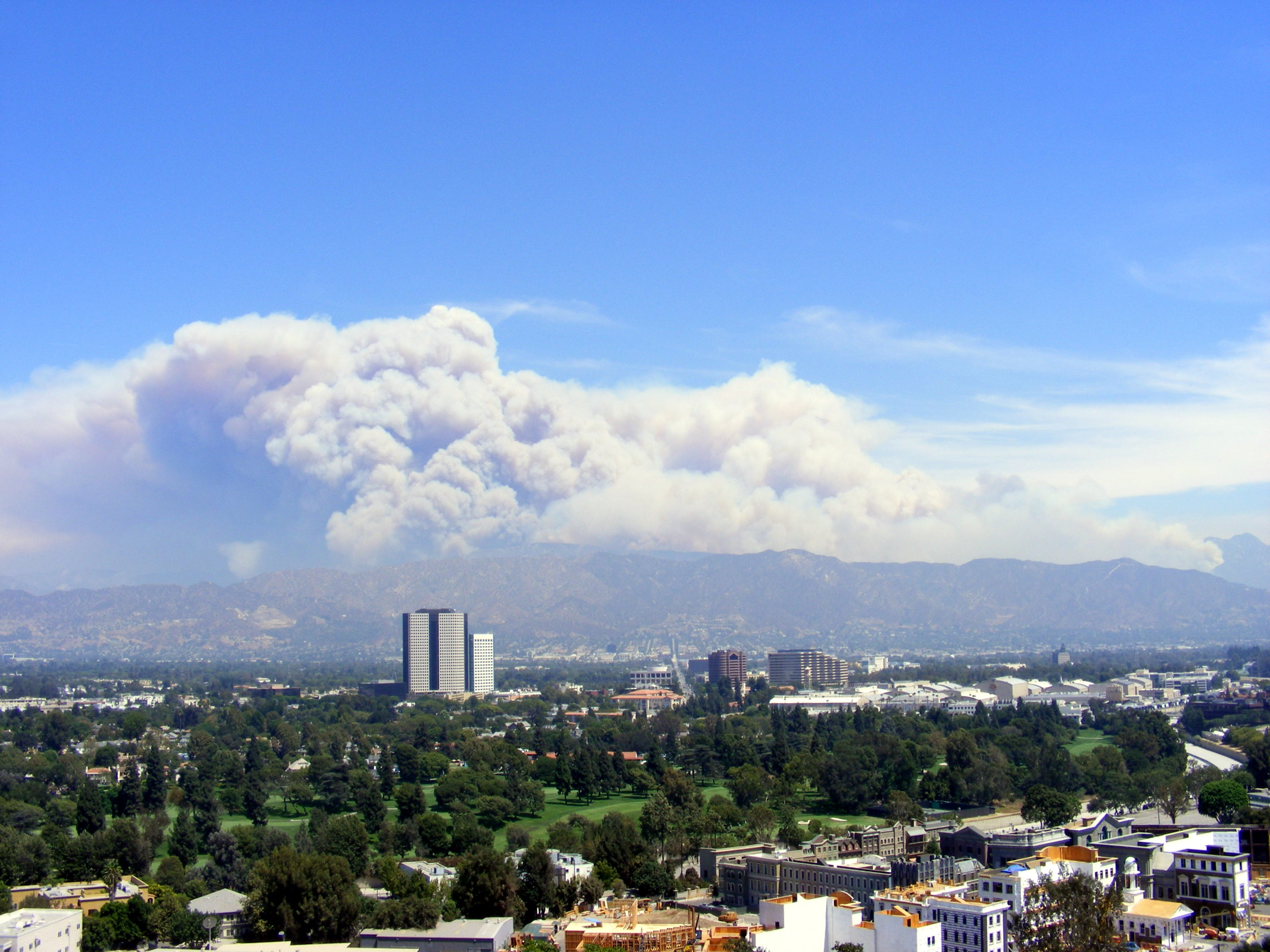
Picture of Los Angeles fires in August 2009. Photo was taken from Universal Studios Hollywood.

Dozens of fires burned throughout California in August 2009. Some of the most notable are listed here.

=== Northern California ===
==== Alameda County ====
- The Corral Fire began on August 13 along Corral Hollow Road, outside the Carnegie State Vehicular Recreation Area, near Tracy in Alameda County. It burned 12,500 acres (20 mi^{2}; 51 km^{2}) of dry grass before being fully contained on August 16.

==== Mariposa County ====
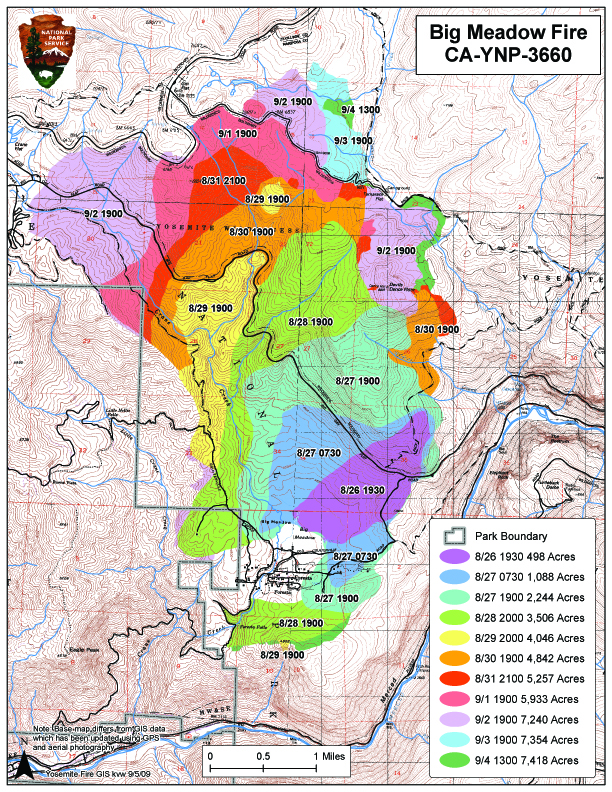
Progression of the Big Meadow Fire between August 26 and September 5, 2009. Map courtesy of the United States Forest Service.

- The Big Meadow Fire began on August 26 in Big Meadow, two miles (3 km) east of El Portal, just inside Yosemite National Park. As of September 4, this fire has burned 7,425 acres (12 mi^{2}; 30 km^{2}) in the Mariposa County section of Yosemite, resulting in the closure of several trails, campgrounds and the portion of State Highway 120 known as Tioga Road. The community of Foresta was evacuated but residents were allowed to return on September 4. The Big Meadow Fire is 96% contained as of September 6, with full containment expected by September 10. This blaze was the result of a prescribed burn gone out of control, leading some to question the judgment of Park authorities.

==== Placer County ====
- The Mammoth Fire started on July 16 and burned 643 acres (3 km^{2}) in the American River Canyon and Mammoth Bar Recreation Area east of Auburn before it was contained on July 18. The fire closed the Foresthill Bridge, the highest bridge in California, for 2 days. It took 358 firefighters, 24 engines, and a helicopter to put out. The cause was undetermined as of July 18, 2009.
- The Foresthill Fire started on August 27 and burned 30 acres (120,000 m^{2}) along the American River Canyon near the Foresthill Bridge before it was contained on August 28. This fire is close to the location of the Mammoth Fire. The fire took over 100 firefighters, 10 engines, 3 airtankers (planes), and 2 helicopters to extinguish. The cause was undetermined as of August 28, 2009.
- The 49 Fire was a small but very destructive fire that began on August 30 and was fully contained by CalFire on September 1. Although it burned only 343 acres (0.5 mi^{2}; 1.4 km^{2}), it destroyed 63 homes and 3 commercial structures in the unincorporated area of North Auburn in Placer County. The fire extensively damaged 3 more homes and 6 more businesses. The fire began along the east side of Highway 49, which led to the name 49 Fire. The fire quickly spread north and east. The fire spread so quickly that some residents barely escaped their burning homes. Auburn Municipal Airport was closed during the fire, which burned right up to the runway. The fire's cause is arson. The arsonist lit a second fire just east of the original fire 20 minutes after the first fire. This added to the destruction and fire spread. This was the second fire to burn the area in 5 years.

==== Santa Cruz/Monterey/San Benito Counties ====
- The Lockheed Fire began on August 12 near the Lockheed Martin Space Systems campus in Santa Cruz County. A total of 7,817 acres (12 mi^{2}; 32 km^{2}) burned and thirteen structures were destroyed, including four seasonal cabins but no primary residences. No cause has been identified. The communities of Swanton and Bonny Doon were evacuated and a state of emergency was declared by Lieutenant Governor John Garamendi on August 14. State fire crews achieved 100% containment on August 23, at a cost of US$26.6 million. Many hillsides burned by the Lockheed Fire had not burned since 1948 due to active fire suppression in the area. Some plant species endemic to the area, including the endangered Santa Cruz manzanita, propagate only after fire, potentially allowing these rare species to proliferate for the first time in decades.
- The Bryson Fire started from a mobile home fire on Bryson-Hesperia Road in the Monterey County town of Lockwood. It burned 3,383 acres (5 mi^{2}; 14 km^{2}) and five structures, including three homes, between August 26 and August 28.
- The Gloria Fire began on August 27 along Camphora Gloria Road near the town of Soledad. It burned 6,437 acres (10 mi^{2}; 26 km^{2}) in Monterey and San Benito counties, destroying a house and another structure before CalFire contained it on August 31 at a cost of US$4 million. The fire was set off by fireworks used to scare away birds outside of a winery and a criminal investigation is underway to determine who is responsible.
- The Loma Fire (October 25–27), 669 acres (1.045 mi^{2}; 2.71 km^{2}) (initially reported as 600 acres) began near Loma Prieta Way in Santa Clara County and spread to the Santa Cruz County area of Maymens Flat – Highland Road, Eureka Canyon and Ormsby. One residence destroyed with 160 structures threatened and evacuations in place for north Ormsby Cutoff until October 26. 1,742 firefighters with 4 injuries reported; cost $2.7 million. High winds contributed to the spread in the Summit area of the Santa Cruz Mountains in an area which had 6 inches (150 mm) of rain on October 13.

==== Yuba County ====
- The Yuba Fire was started after a red-tailed hawk flew into a power line on August 14, and burned 3,891 acres (6 mi^{2}; 16 km^{2}) before being contained on August 21 at a cost of US$12.1 million. Two residences in Yuba County burned and power lines transporting electricity from a hydroelectric facility were threatened.

=== Southern California ===
==== Los Angeles County ====
- The Morris Fire (August 25 – September 3, 2,168 acres (3 mi^{2}; 9 km^{2})) began near Morris Dam in the Angeles National Forest. This fire is thought to have been caused by arson.
- The Station Fire (August 26 – October 16, 160,577 acres (251 mi^{2}; 650 km^{2}), 209 structures destroyed, including 89 homes) started in the Angeles National Forest near the U.S. Forest Service ranger station on the Angeles Crest Highway (State Highway 2). Two firefighters, Captain Tedmund Hall and Firefighter Specialist Arnie Quinones were killed on August 30 while attempting to escape the flames when their fire truck plunged off a cliff.

==== San Bernardino County ====
- The Sheep Fire (October 3–10, 7,128 acres (11.1 mi^{2}; 28.8 km^{2})) started near Sheep Canyon Road near Lytle Creek east of Mount Baldy and west of the Cajon Pass in the San Gabriel Mountains. Mandatory evacuations were in place for all Wrightwood residents October 4–6; the fireline held at 0.3-mile (480 m) from Wrightwood homes. Five structures had been destroyed in the Lone Pine and Swarthout Canyon areas including one residence. Eight firefighters have been injured but no fatalities have been reported. Below-freezing temperatures in the mountain areas helped fire crews in containment on October 6. Suppression costs as of 9 October 2009: $7,977,000.

==== Santa Barbara County ====
- The Jesusita Fire was a wildfire that began at approximately 1:45 PM on May 5, 2009, in the hills of Santa Barbara, California. The fire burned 8,733 acres (35.34 km^{2}), destroyed 80 homes and damaged 15 more before being 100% contained.
- The La Brea Fire began near La Brea Creek in Santa Barbara County, inside of Los Padres National Forest. The fire burned 89,489 acres (140 mi^{2}; 362 km^{2}) of chaparral between August 8 and August 22, but only destroyed two structures—a cabin and an unused ranger station.

==== Ventura County ====
- The Guiberson Fire in Ventura County has burnt an estimated 8,500 acres (34 km^{2}), destroying two outbuildings and injuring two firefighters. Governor Schwarzenegger declared a state of emergency. The fire, which started between Fillmore and Moorpark, has caused the evacuation of almost 600 homes in Meridian Hills and Bardsdale; about 1,000 structures were threatened, in addition to oil pipelines in the area. On September 27, the Guiberson Fire was 100% contained, after burning approximately 17,500 acres (71 km^{2}). The cause of the fire is still unknown.
