= Fred Swanton =

American politician

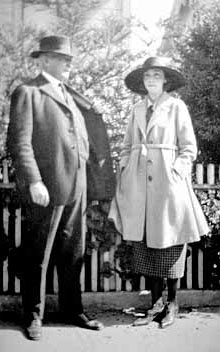
- With ZaSu Pitts in 1919
- Born: April 11, 1862; Brooklyn, New York, U.S.
- Died: September 3, 1940 (aged 78); Santa Cruz, California, U.S.
- Occupation(s): Businessman, politician
- Known for: Santa Cruz Boardwalk

Fred Wilder Swanton (1862–1940) was an American entrepreneur and real estate developer who served as mayor of Santa Cruz, California from 1927 until 1933. He promoted the expansion of Santa Cruz as a beach resort city. The seaside resort he established in 1904 remains today as the Santa Cruz Beach Boardwalk.

== Life ==
Fred Swanton was born April 11, 1862, in Brooklyn, New York. His father was Albion Paris Swanton (1826–1911) who traveled to California in 1864, and was then followed by his wife Emily (Parshley) Swanton with Fred in 1866. After living briefly in Pescadero, California, they settled in Santa Cruz, California, in 1867. Swanton attended public schools and then graduated from Heald Business College in 1881.

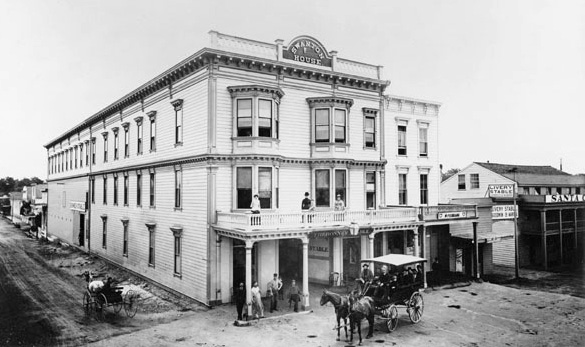
Swanton House Hotel in 1886

He worked as a bookkeeper at various lumber companies in California until 1883, when he and his mother traveled east to visit relatives. He returned with the patent license for the telephone, which he sold through most of California. On December 25, 1884, he married Stanley Hall in Santa Cruz. He operated a hotel called the Swanton House with his father and ran Knight's Opera House theater. The hotel was the tallest building in the city when it was built. It burned down on May 30, 1887, and he started a livery business called Bonner Stables, and then a store called the Palace of Pharmacy, and briefly owned a billboard business. In October 1889 he sold those businesses, and with Dr. H. H. Clark started the first electric company in the area. He developed the Santa Cruz Electric Railway which ran cars from the beach to Santa Cruz and the Santa Cruz-Capitola Railroad to the new resort of Capitola, California, to the south. In 1900 he invested in the Klondike Gold Rush, but by then the profits had been made. He also dabbled in oil fields and a chromite mine.

In 1896, Swanton led a group of investors who built California's third hydroelectric power plant, on Big Creek in Santa Cruz County. Direct-current electricity was sent to Santa Cruz, where Swanton's company created the city's first electrical power distribution system. The system powered the Santa Cruz Electric Railway, among other businesses and residences. The community on the lower reaches of Big Creek was later renamed Swanton in his honor. A memorial plaque was placed there in 2010 to recount the history.

== "Coney Island of the west" ==
Since 1865 the first of several bath houses operated on the Santa Cruz beach, and in 1868 a small boardwalk was built. Swanton envisioned developing the area into a resort similar to Atlantic City, New Jersey, or Coney Island near his native Brooklyn. In October 1903 he held a meeting at the courthouse and predicted shares in his enterprise would return up to 25%. On October 29, 1903, the Santa Cruz Beach, Cottage, and Tent City Corporation was formed, and over US$100,000 was raised. Swanson was Director-General (although personally invested only $250). He traveled throughout the state selling shares, eventually raising $1.5million. Existing bath houses were purchased with stock shares, and a tent city was constructed on land leased from the Southern Pacific Railroad. In April 1904 the city granted an exclusive franchise for the beach to the company. Although some residents protested because the city had paid for many improvements such as extending roads, mayor David C. Clark (supported by Swanton in his election campaign) broke a tie in the city council to award the contract.

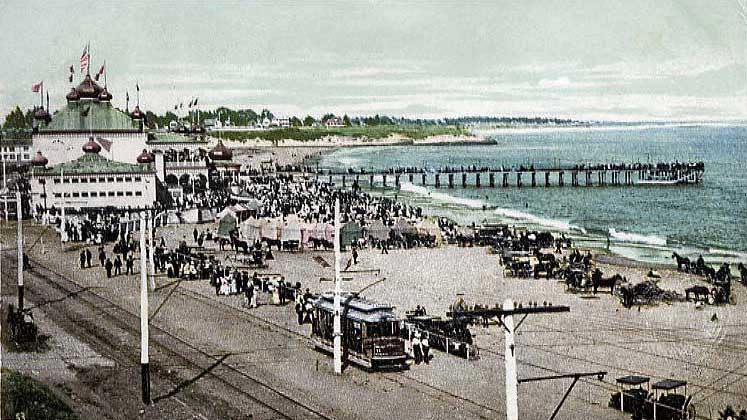
The 1904 Neptune Casino with horses and an electric trolley

In the summer of 1904 the Neptune Casino (named after one of the original bath houses) was built, designed by architect Edward L. Van Cleeck. The Casino had a style similar to the Royal Pavilion in Brighton, England (the New Brighton State Beach lies a few miles to the south). The two story building with 245 feet (75 m) of beach front, was painted bright colors, and included dining rooms, a ballroom, and theater. A third floor rotunda was used as an observatory with views of the ocean. A "pleasure pier" 400 feet (120 m) long built over intake pipes for the baths (called the Plunge) was lit by electric lights. An opening ceremony was held June 11, 1904.

After a profitable first year, the pier was extended in 1905, and Swanton planned further expansion. The Neptune Casino survived the April 1906 San Francisco earthquake, but burned down on June 22, 1906 from a kitchen fire. A large tent was erected and the Republican Party of California held their convention there in the summer. Swanton sold his electric company and trolley business to free up capital, and again raised more money to rebuild. Architect William Henry Weeks was hired to design an even larger complex which opened by June 15, 1907.

In 1908, the first "thrill ride" opened, a miniature railway designed by LaMarcus Adna Thompson. In 1911, a carousel commissioned from Charles I. D. Looff was installed with an 1894 band organ from Andreas Ruth & Sohn. Swanton developed the Casa Del Rey Hotel across the street from the Casino in 1911. By 1912, a business downturn caused by the Panic of 1910–1911 wiped out the original stockholders. For the third time Swanton convinced investors to raise funds for the enterprise. By 1915 the Santa Cruz Seaside Company took over with Swanton again becoming an investor.

== Show business and politics ==
Swanton tried to convince Hollywood movie producers to film in Santa Cruz. The silent film A Romance of the Redwoods was filmed in the area by Cecil B. DeMille. Edward Ferguson and W.D. Dalton (under the name "Fer Dal") and Theodore Wharton established studios briefly, but interest waned during World War I.

In 1914 Swanton acted as agent of actress ZaSu Pitts, and staged a benefit performance at the Opera House to finance the start of her film career. He became so well known the city was sometimes called Swanticruz or Swanta Cruz. He became president of the Combined Amusement Company to build exhibits for the amusement park called the Zone at the 1915 Panama–Pacific International Exposition in San Francisco. In 1924 he obtained the Miss America franchise for the state and started the Miss California beauty pageant, which was held in Santa Cruz until 1985. The first "Miss Santa Cruz", Fay Lanphier won the first two contests and became Miss America in 1925. Swanton was elected mayor of Santa Cruz on July 4, 1927, and was reelected for two more terms until 1933, when Roy Hammond took the office.

Prohibition reduced profits, and the Neptune Casino had its name changed to "Cocoanut Grove". Business declined and his plans for real estate development fell through during the Great Depression.

== Death ==
Swanton died in Santa Cruz on September 3, 1940. He was described as a cross between P. T. Barnum and California Senator Samuel M. Shortridge, or the "P. T. Barnum of Santa Cruz".

== Legacy ==
The resort is still owned by the private Santa Cruz Seaside Company. The amusement park is known as the Santa Cruz Beach Boardwalk, which is a California Historical Landmark. and National Historic Landmark.

The community of Swanton and Swanton Road, 14 miles (23 km) to the north of Santa Cruz were named after him, site of the Swanton Pacific Ranch where his hydro-electric power generators were built. The site of his failed subdivision (at his namesake Swanton Boulevard, 36°57′8″N 122°3′15″W) is now Natural Bridges State Beach, originally called Swanton Beach State Park.

== See also ==
- Santa Cruz Looff Carousel and Roller Coaster
- Giant Dipper
