= Auburn Municipal Airport (California) =

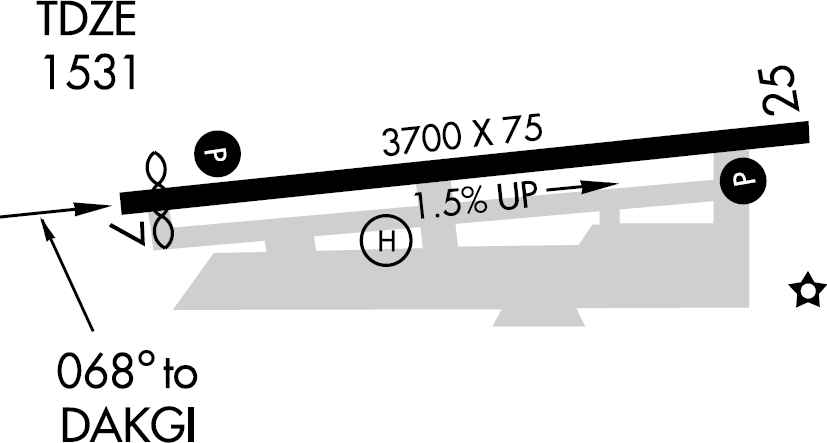
- FAA Airport aiagram
- IATA: AUN; ICAO: KAUN; FAA LID: AUN

Summary
- Airport type: Public
- Owner/Operator: City of Auburn
- Serves: Auburn, California
- Location: 3 mi (5 km) north of downtown
- Elevation AMSL: 1,536 ft (468 m)
- Coordinates: 38°57′17″N 121°04′54″W
- Website: Auburn Municipal Airport...
- Interactive map of Auburn Municipal Airport

Runways
Direction	Length		Surface
Direction	ft	m	Surface
7/25	3,700	1,128	Asphalt

Statistics (2009)
- Hangars: 81
- Permanent tie-downs: 112
- Transient tie-downs: 18
- Auburn Municipal Airport,

Auburn Municipal Airport (IATA: AUN, ICAO: KAUN, FAA LID: AUN) is a public airport located three miles (5 km) north of Auburn, serving Placer County, California, United States. It is mostly used for general aviation.

The City of Auburn owns and operates the airport. The federal government built the airport in 1934 and used it to support mail service until 1946. In 1947, local residents worked to transfer the airport to the city from the federal government and private land owners.

Services include air ambulance, aviation fuel, flight instruction, private charters & rentals, repairs & maintenance, a restaurant, and scenic tours. Private businesses provide these services. Law enforcement aviation operations based out of the airport include the Placer County Sheriff's Office and the Valley Division Air Operations of the California Highway Patrol.

On 30 August 2009, a wildfire named the 49 Fire started southwest of the airport and spread north and east. The fire forced officials to close the airport for a few days. The fire burned 343 acres (1.39 km^{2}), including the airport's western portion (right up to the runway).

== Facilities ==
Auburn Municipal Airport covers 285 acres (115 ha) and has one runway:

- Runway 7/25: 3,700 x 75 ft (1,128 x 23 m) plus 240 ft (73 m) overruns at each end, surface: asphalt

The city owns 285 acres (115 ha) around the airport. The airport occupies 205 acres (83 ha). An industrial park fills the remaining 80 acres (32 ha).

- TGH Aviation
  - The Gyro House, d.b.a. TGH Aviation, is a Part 145 instrument repair station with a fixed-base operator (FBO) at the Auburn Municipal Airport. Services available include instrument & avionics overhauls, exchanges and sales, instrument & avionics installation, and pitot static certifications.
- TGH Aviation Airport Shop is a retail and online store. It offers a large assortment of aviation supplies including: charting supplies, aircraft maintenance supplies, headsets, oxygen systems, avionics/GPS, aircraft memorabilia, children's aviation novelties and apparel.
- FBO: Mach 5 Aviation, Inc. provides aircraft maintenance, aircraft rental and flight training. Veteran owned and FAA part 141 certified Flight School. Flight Instruction includes Private, Sport, Instrument, Commercial, Multi-Engine, Flight Instructor and Airline Transport Pilot (in conjunction with William Jessup University). Advanced training includes Upset Recovery, Spin, Tail-wheel, basic aerobatics. Web site: https://www.mach5aviation.com/
- FBO: Sunshine Flyers Flight School is a flight training center and aircraft rental. Flight instruction includes advanced training, mountain flying, spin training, tailwheel instruction, sport pilot, private, instrument, commercial, and CFI.
