= Swanton Pacific Ranch =

Ranch in California, United States

Coordinates: 37.0428°N 122.2223°W

Swanton Pacific Ranch is a 3,200-acre (1,300 ha) ranch in Santa Cruz County, California, outside the town of Davenport. The ranch is owned and operated by California Polytechnic State University (Cal Poly) for educational and research in sustainable agriculture. The ranch encompasses rangeland, livestock, and forestry operations for the College of Agriculture, Food and Environmental Sciences, comprises a significant part of the community of Swanton, and includes the lower Scott Creek watershed.

== History ==
Barn, Built in 1880

The Central California region was occupied by the Ohlone Indian Tribe. The tribe resided near Waddell Creek (which runs from east to west) until sometime in the mid 19th century. In November 1843, the land was granted to Ramon Rodriguez and Francisco Alviso by the Mexican Governor of California Manuel Micheltorena. The land grant, named Rancho Agua Puerca y las Trancas, meaning "Hog Water and the Bars", was confirmed by president Andrew Johnson on March 1, 1867. The same year it was sold to James Archibald. To manage the dairy farm he hired Ambrogio Gianone, a Swiss immigrant who constructed the cheese house in 1867 and the barn in 1880 which are still standing. Eventually, Gianone bought a third of the ranch land on the northern end now known as Gianone Hill. After Archibald died in 1875 his wife sold the remainder of the land to Joseph Bloom who continued to use the land for water and farming.

The future mayor of Santa Cruz, Fred Swanton, decided that the land could be used to generate renewable energy. In the last decade of the 1800s he built a powerhouse with two dams on Big Creek and Mill Creek, and generated hydro-electric power for the Central Coast Counties Gas and Electric which became part of PG&E. However, after a forest fire broke out the flume was destroyed and the powerhouse was abandoned. To assist with logging on the land the Ocean Shore Railroad was constructed. It ran along the coast from San Francisco to Santa Cruz. The railroad hauled logs out of Swanton to the San Vincente Lumber Company sawmill in Santa Cruz. The redwood from this logging was used to rebuild San Francisco after the 1906 earthquake. In 1922 the railroad was shut down due to a demand for higher wages from its employees.

In the 1920s residents realized artichokes and Brussels sprouts grew well in the coastal area. A dam was installed on Scott's Creek and water was transported to the upper terraces for irrigation. What is now rangeland has remnants of reservoirs from this time period. The Poletti and Morelli families became the owners in 1938. The ranch was divided into three phases: a Grade B Dairy, a beef cattle operation and an assortment of row crops. Later John and Bob Musitelli took over beef and cattle and developed a cow-calf operation. As the Muistelli's expanded their operation the Grade B dairy left.

By 1978 Albert B. Smith, president of Orchard Supply Hardware, acquired Swanton Pacific Ranch. He first learned about the area in a Boy Scout camp there. When the camp closed, Smith bought the land and then over time bought the rest of Swanton Pacific Ranch. In 1993, he donated the ranch to Cal Poly saying:

Swanton is an uncrowded, beautiful place. My goal in putting this acreage together is to preserve it as such and to share it now and in the future with people who will appreciate it and profit from the experience. Thanks for listening!" - Albert B. Smith

== Geography ==
Swanton Pacific Ranch sits in the coastal mountains north of Santa Cruz. The 3,200-acre (1,300 ha) spread include 2,100 acres (850 ha) of forest extending from steep mountain slopes down to grassy meadows. Scott Creek runs through Swanton Ranch. "The landscape is different here than on campus," notes natural resource management Professor Brian Dietterick, a certified hydrologist and the ranch's director. "First are coastal forested mountains- steep mountains that support perennially flowing streams. The streams serve as habitat for sensitive aquatic species and fish like Coho salmon and Steelhead trout." Swanton Pacific is a unique place to teach resource management. "It's similar to a Northern California Forest," he states. Swanton Pacific is a living forest laboratory unlike any other at Cal Poly's 1,300-acre (530 ha) campus core or the 4,600 acres (1,900 ha) of university ranches just west of the campus. Swanton Ranch overlooks the Pacific Ocean. It lies fifteen miles (24 km) north of Santa Cruz. The elevation ranges from sea level to around 1,200 feet (370 m) on the highest ridge north of Little Creek. There are four ecological regions on the land: cropland, forest, rangeland and riparian land. Riparian lands are adjacent to water sources. There are riparian corridors along Scotts Creek, Mill Creek, Little Creek, Archibald Creek, Queseria Creek, and some smaller unnamed drainages. The riparian corridors provide a habitat for both the endangered Central California Coast evolutionary significant unit of coho salmon and the threatened Central California Coast distinct population segment of steelhead.

Almost half of Swanton Pacific Ranch, 1,355 acres (548 ha), is covered with mixed forest. Over 63% of the forest contains Redwood trees. (Todd, 1988). The majority of the remaining land is grassland with about 330 acres (130 ha) of brush. The major riparian corridor goes straight through the center of the ranch along Scotts Creek. It widens to 120 feet (37 m) at the estuary which flows into the ocean. The rest of the riparian corridors are only a few feet wide due to steep slopes. There are 102 acres (41 ha) of cultivated land. Vegetables dominate the crops grown at Swanton. There is also some oat hay grown on the ranch.

== Ranch facilities ==
Staub House

The facilities on Swanton Ranch are used for ranch management and student housing. The Ranch administrative offices are housed in the Green House, which has a kitchen/dining room area for interns studying and staying on the Ranch. The Red House contains two meeting rooms that open into one large room. The Red House has five bedrooms for student interns, two bathrooms and a kitchen. The Al Smith House is located on the east side of Swanton Road, just north of the Cal Fire station. This house was built by Al Smith for his frequent visits. It has two bedrooms, two baths and a magnificent stone fireplace. The living room overlooks the ocean. There is a separate training facility here which can be used as a meeting room. A water monitoring lab is also located in the Al Smith House. The barn at Swanton Ranch was built in 1874. It is enclosed with wood siding that was milled from the Ranch's own timber. It has a corrugated iron roof. Much of the structure was originally constructed with pegs rather than nails. Cal Poly SLO has taken over the restoration of the barn and has used the original construction concepts whenever feasible when remodeling it. The Bunk House is another place for interns to stay while studying at the Ranch. It currently can accommodate ten students. It has seven bedrooms and four bathrooms. The Staub House has a living area upstairs for resident graduate students, and a kitchen which serves the yurts on the lower level. It is named for one of the previous settlers on the Ranch. The Yurts, located in front of the Staub House provide accommodations for forty people on field trips to Swanton Ranch. The yurts were installed in 1999. There is also a building called the Cheese House on Swanton Ranch. The Cheese House is listed in the County Register of Historic Buildings.

=== Swanton Pacific Railroad ===
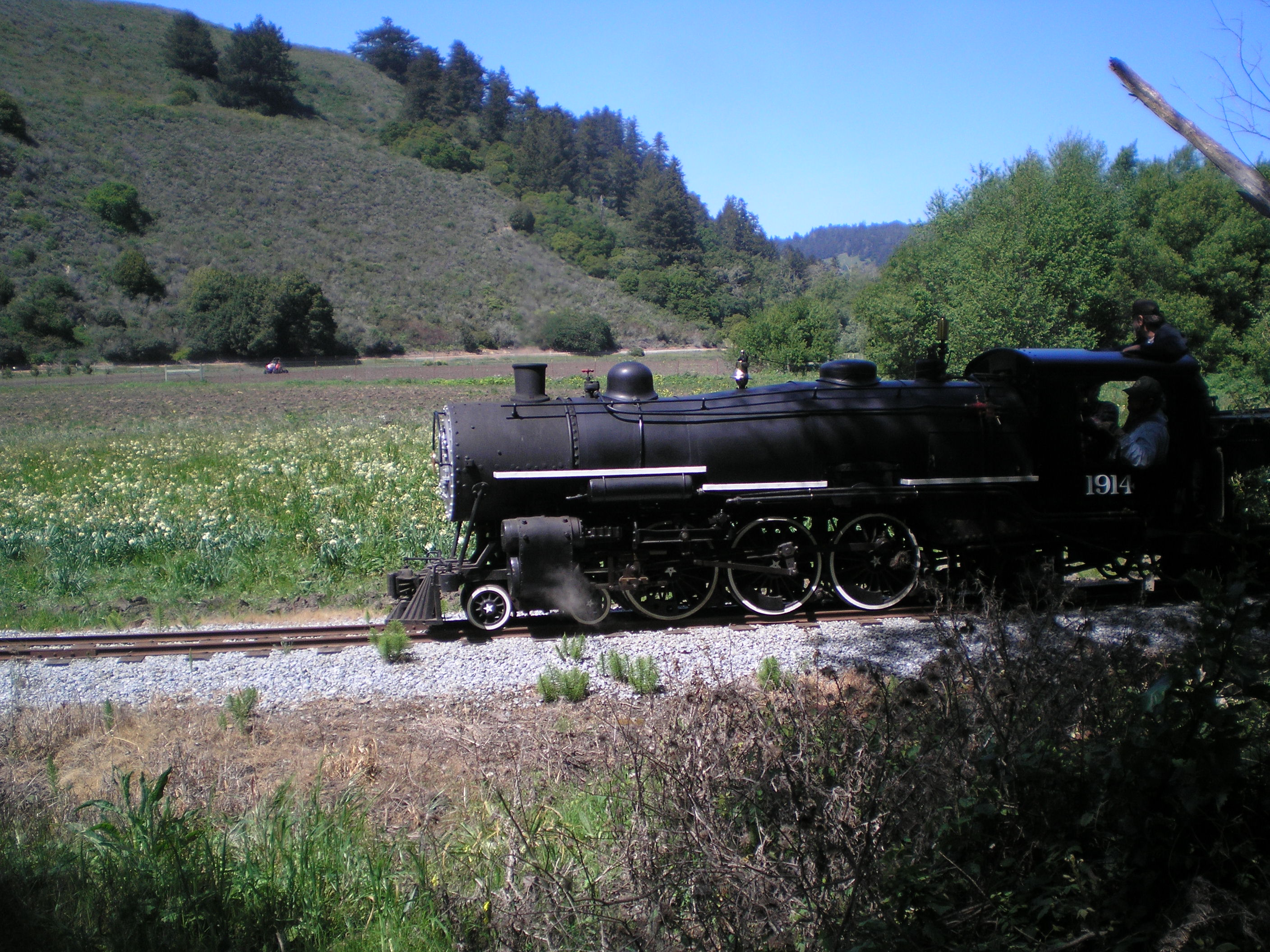
Railroad system at Swanton Pacific Ranch

The 19 in (483 mm) gauge Swanton Pacific Railroad was constructed in the 1980s by Albert Smith. This miniature railway is scaled to 1/3 standard size with four miniature steam locomotives built by Louis MacDermot for the Overfair Railway. The Overfair was originally part of the Panama–Pacific International Exposition of 1915 which was an official celebration of the completion of the Panama Canal. However, after the exposition, the Overfair Railway did not have much success. The locomotives were stored on MacDermot's estate and would not run again until the 1980s. Al Smith had previously worked for the Southern Pacific Railroad and decided to purchase the locomotives from an auction because of his love of railroads. In 1979 he began laying the rails along Scotts Creek with the help of volunteers. The railroad was maintained and run by the Swanton Pacific Railroad Society. It attracted many visitors, especially railfans, who volunteered to support its operation.

In 2020 the site was damaged by the CZU Lightning Complex fires. The wildfire scorched tracks, historic buildings and three of the original engines. On December 2, 2022, Cal Poly University, announced "the railroad does not fit within the strategic intent of the [land]", explaining its decision to abandon the efforts to rebuild the railroad. The railroad will be permanently closed, its equipment donated, and the land will be refocused towards "educational pursuits".

== Land uses ==
Land Use Map

Swanton Pacific Ranch is a self-sustaining non-profit organization and educational institution that provides hands-on learning about sustainable resource management. The Ranch is run like a commercial ranching operation, with crops, grazing and forestry programs covering 80% of operating expenses. The remaining 20% comes from an endowment through Al Smith, a Cal Poly SLO Alumni that gave the Ranch to Cal Poly SLO. Swanton Pacific Ranch serves the people of California as part of the California Polytechnic State University. The Ranch provides educational opportunities for K-12th grade, college age and above. Agricultural programs provide education while incorporating sensitivity for environmental concerns. Ranch management falls into three divisions; forestry, rangeland and cropland.

=== Forestry ===
==== Management philosophy ====
Cal Poly SLO provides students with a quality education program in Forest Management. The university is committed to presenting a full scope of all timber management procedures to their students. Management activities range from prime commercial Redwood/Douglas fir forests to restoring poor quality damaged stands and improving the genetic base of native Monterey pine trees. Cal Poly SLO students are provided the complex experience of maintaining an uneven aged forest. Valencia Creek and Swanton Pacific are very unusual properties. They each have different harvest rotations and timber harvest plans. These properties provide Cal Poly SLO students with an excellent "learn by doing" opportunity that encompasses the full spectrum of forest management. Cal Poly SLO's forest project goals are twofold; to provide a quality educational program and to ensure healthy forests. The forest management practices are guided by The Forest Stewardship Council's principles and criteria for certified forests. To accomplish the goals of the program, Cal Poly SLO provides the most up to date and innovative management practices available to minimize environmental damage during the harvest. Concern is giving to wildlife habitat but also to making sure the timber stands remain healthy in the future. Redwood also re-sprouts after harvesting. No replanting is required. Some understocked areas are planted with Redwood to increase the Redwood component. Careful monitoring and thinning of the existing clumps is undertaken. The Redwood harvest in the early 1900s included burning which probably helped the regrowth become stronger. Douglas fir does not re-sprout and so must be planted where desired.

=== Management sites ===
==== Little Creek ====
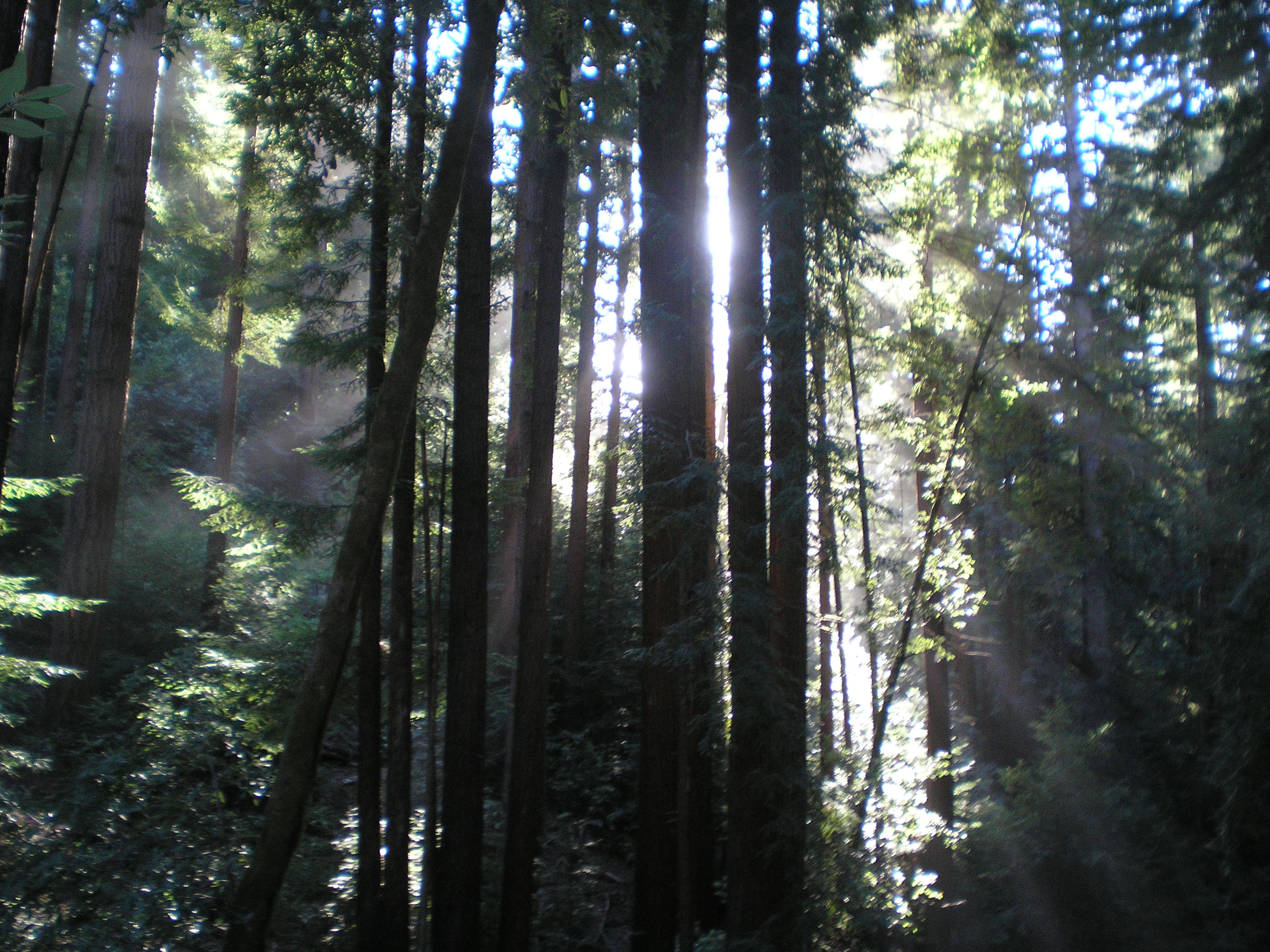
Redwoods-Little Creek

There are approximately 316 acres (128 ha) in the Little Creek Forest Management area. The first cutting was done between 1907 and 1911 by clear cut and burn railroad logging. Forty acres of the second growth Redwood were harvested in the 1960s. There was very little timber left to manage. With the exception of the 40 acres (16 ha) of second growth Redwood that was cut, the logging in Little Creek Forest generated an even-aged stand approximately 80 years old of Douglas fir and Redwood trees. The under story trees consist of mostly Tanoak with a few Madrones mixed in. Piper, Kelly and Anderson in 1989 conducted a continuous forest inventory survey. They established an inventory of 26,163 bd ft/acre (152.56 m^{3}/ha) for Redwood and 17,318 bd ft/acre (100.98 m^{3}/ha) for Douglas fir. They did this using 1/5 acre (0.081 ha) CFI plots. The plots were reestablished in 1997 by Larry Bonner. This inventory indicated 28,612 bd ft/acre (166.84 m^{3}/ha) for Redwood and 8,923 bd ft/acre (52.03 m^{3}/ha) for Douglas fir. Currently the distribution is approximately 76% Redwood and 24% Douglas fir (Bonner 1998). The preferred management of this unit would be an uneven aged stand with a mix of 70% Redwood and 30% Douglas fir. Presently Cal Poly SLO students are converting this unit to an uneven-aged stand. This meets the Santa Cruz timber regulations for selective harvesting. The forestry program has completed two timber harvest plans for the Little Creek Unit that complied with State and Local Timber Regulations. The first harvest was completed in 1990-91 and harvested 1,500,000 bd ft (3,500 m^{3}) for a gross return of $200,000. The second was undertaken in 1993-95 and grossed $542,803 for the same amount of timber. The difference in the return was due to the increase in timber prices over the years. Presently, 259 of the remaining 315 acres (127 ha) have been harvested over the last fifteen years. One more area will be harvested over the next two years. Cutting cycles are planned for ten to fifteen year periods with an evaluation done after five years. Little Creek Forest inventory plots were established with permanent markers on a 500-by-500-foot (152.4 m × 152.4 m) grid. The stands are divided by forest inventory, topography and access. A total of eight stands currently exist in the North and South Fork units. Each stand will have an ongoing evaluation data sheet developed to measure environmental factors such as effects on the trees due to disease, mass land movements and fire. A schedule of work will also be developed for each stand. A non-industrial timber harvest plan has been completed also been approved.

==== Scott's Creek ====
The Scott's Creek Forest unit is very steep and difficult to manage. There are a few areas, some grasslands that could be suitable for small experimental plantations. A mixture of both natural and planted stands of Monterey pines and a variety of hardwood trees including riparian forest make up this unit. Scott's Creek boasts the world's largest nutmeg tree. Cal Poly is considering building a hauling road across Scott's Creek to provide permanent access for the railroad and vehicles. Santa Cruz County recently changed some of their zoning regulations which have blocked the THP submitted for this unit. A zoning change request for the parcels involved was submitted to Santa Cruz County in 2001. Following a baseline and grid system report done in November 1999, a Continuous Forestry Inventory (CFI) was completed by Steve Auten in January 2000. This Scott's Creek CFI study was based on the Little Creek CFI Bonner method. The study estimated a mixture of 54.9 acres (22.2 ha) of Monterey pine, and 207.1 acres (83.8 ha) of redwood/Douglas fir mix. It was based on a sampling of 9.2 acres (3.7 ha) of the 262 acres (106 ha) using the volume equation method. The confidence for these results was less than 95% because the stand is so variable. Brush is heavy throughout most of the stand which impacts seedling growth. The study suggested the high grade logging in 1955 has negatively affected growth in this unit. It has also determined that 90% of the Monterey pines are infected with pitch canker. This study also determined the Monterey pine seedlings experience a lower infection rate than those over one inch in diameter. Because the stands are so variable the study warned against blanket treatments but instead recommended the first harvest be for cleaning rather than revenue. It also suggested a controlled burn on the upper slopes to remove competing brush.

==== Valencia Creek ====
Valencia Creek Forest was purchased by Albert Smith in 1993 at the same time he purchased Swanton Ranch. It lies close to the town of Aptos along Soquel Creek. The Valencia stand consists mostly of redwoods with some scattered Douglas fir stands. There are some hardwoods like Tan oak, Madrone and Shreve oak in the mix. The whole site was clear cut at the turn of the twentieth century. There were two subsequent harvests in the 1960s and 1970s. These harvests led to a gap in the 1–6-inch (2.5–15.2 cm) size trees. The stand is approximately one hundred years old with a few old growth trees still standing. The Valencia Creek Forest presents interesting opportunities for study and evaluation in the areas of uneven-aged forest management of coastal Redwood forests. See the Valencia Creek NTMP.

==== Satellite units ====
The satellite units represent seven smaller and less marketable stands of mostly Douglas fir with some Monterey pines mixed in. There are also small pockets of redwood in the more protected and wetter sites. An estimated 15,340,000 board feet (36,200 m^{3}) are contained in the satellite and Scotts Creek stands. Only approximately 3,000,000 board feet (7,100 m^{3}) were considered harvestable in the Big Creek Lumber report (1991). Only 1,000,000 to 1,500,000 board feet (2,400 to 3,500 m^{3}) of the 3,000,000 board feet (7,100 m^{3}) will be harvestable in the next twenty years. The harvestable trees are widely scattered. Education is the primary value of the satellite units. There is much remedial work to be done such as sanitation/salvage, timber stand improvement, site preparation and planting operations. Environmental reasons will keep the roads used in earlier harvesting of these units to not be used again.

=== Erosion Control ===
Erosion control is addressed in the THP for each management unit. In general uneven-aged management helps ensure ground cover, which minimizes erosion. Road maintenance is done to decrease erosion. Between October and April ATV's and a Polaris are used for access and forestry work. During this time period no vehicles are permitted to use the roads. Each spring and early fall the roads are maintained. The ranch currently maintains road crossings and culverts by using GIS technology.

=== Streams ===
The Forest Practice Rules dictate the permitted distance or buffer from the watershed which logging activities can occur. This distance is different based on stream class and slope. All the watersheds located on Swanton Pacific Ranch provide habitat for Coho Salmon (or are tributaries of streams that provide habitat). For these watersheds the WLPZ (Water Lake Protection Zone) permits a 75-to-200-foot (23 to 61 m) buffer where no harvesting activities can take place. There also must be 80% shade covering left after harvesting.

=== Pests and disease ===
The hardwood and conifers at Swanton Pacific Ranch have not yet been affected by sudden oak death (SOD). Monitoring for (SOD) must occur to ensure the safety of the trees. If introduced to the ranch, removal of the affected trees and non-contamination is the recommended management treatment. The Redwood suffers from diseases such as heterobasidium annosum and damping off. The Douglas fir, however, is susceptible to defoliator insects such as the western spruce budworm and the Douglas-fir tussock moth. Young trees, thin barked trees and older trees are more susceptible to the fir engraver beetle. Other diseases that will affect Douglas fir include root and butt rot, black stain fungus, red ring rot, red-brown but rot, needle cast and red ring rot. The proper management includes monitoring, removing dead and diseased trees, and maintaining a healthy stand. Pitch canker is the most serious threat to the Monterey pine at the Ranch. Between 80% and 90% of the Pines may be killed by pitch canker. Monterey pine is affected by two endemic pests and diseases; western gall rusts and engraver beetles. By removing infected limbs and good slash disposal the problems have been kept under control. Other potential diseases include shoestring root rot and redband needle blight. Possible insect infestation could include borers, moths, caterpillars, beetles (red turpentine) and aphids.

=== Roads ===
The roads at Swanton Pacific Ranch are well maintained and fit for logging operations. Water bars along with rolling dips have been installed to decrease the amount of erosion during harvesting operations. The road up Little Creek has also been rocked which provides support and reduces run-off and erosion during storm events.

== Livestock ==
Livestock raising is run by the Animal Science Department at Cal Poly SLO. The department raises all natural grain-fed and grass fed beef in the meadowlands at the ranch, selling it twice a year on campus. The 500 plus head of cattle is monitored and moved from pasture to pasture based on the condition of the grasses they eat. The natural beef project fits the "sustainable agriculture" character of Swanton Pacific Ranch.

== Cropland ==

Cropland area is approximately 115 acres (47 ha), all of it CCOF Certified organic production of vegetables and oat hay. The philosophy at Swanton is to provide a diversity of crops and marketing opportunities for students in a "learn by doing" environment. They have a long-term goal of breaking even or better on their returns. Diversity of products and farming organically are both seen as sound business practices. Five fields have been leased to Jacobs Farm / Del Cabo which grows perennial culinary herbs. Apple picking has also become a popular event at Swanton Ranch. The organic u-pick orchard has twelve varieties of apples. The 2-acre (0.81 ha) orchard yields five short tons (4.46 long tons; 4.54 t) of apples every year.

== Research conducted ==
Dr. Dietterick, Brian

Long-term Evaluation of Suspended Sediment Exiting a Coastal Mountain Stream Following Selection Timber Harvesting Activities.

Full Report

Current Santa Cruz County and State of California forest practice rules regarding timber harvesting have not been tested to see if these practices adequately protect local watersheds from possible resultant adverse sediment-related impacts. This project will evaluate the effects of selection timber harvesting in the Little Creek watershed using a paired watershed and upstream/downstream study design. Event-based samples will be collected using automated water quality samplers and analyzed in a lab on-site. Five years of data will be analyzed before the next harvesting activity planned for 2004, allowing for a broad range of baseline conditions.

Long-Term Water Quality, Geomorphic, and Habitat Evaluation of a California Coastal Mountain Stream Following Selection Timber Harvesting Activities

Full Report

This project is essentially an augmentation of an existing ARI project (00–3–011) which uses a paired watershed design to study the effects of timber harvesting practices on water quality. This new proposal enhances the project by monitoring additional water quality parameters, and geomorphic and habitat parameters. Sophisticated interaction between instream sensors and automated water quality samplers will maximize sampling efficiency and statistical validity of the results. Remote data access capabilities will enable monitoring of real-time weather and sampling data to efficiently dispatch field personnel for sample pickup and troubleshoot hydrologic instrumentation.

LIDAR Geomorphic Evaluation of Watershed and Channel Characteristics in the Little Creek Watershed, Swanton Pacific Ranch

Full Report

Recent developments using LIDAR (LIght Detection And Ranging) technology has permitted high-resolution, three-dimensional mapping and the ability to evaluate landscape features, such as channel and watershed characteristics. The ability of high-resolution laser altimetry to accurately identify and evaluate watershed and channel characteristics will be investigated. Comparisons will be made between field-mapped inner gorge areas, streamside landslides, and channel characteristics with the same landscape features generated with digital terrain models derived from the laser altimetry. The results of this study are expected to determine whether LIDAR technology can provide an accurate and cost-effective alternative to delineating watershed and channel characteristics that contribute to cumulative watershed effects analysis required under California Forest Practice Rules. A model will be developed to identify areas susceptible to streamside landslides to help predict potential sediment sources for the cumulative effects analysis and to possibly warrant additional WLPZ (watercourse and lake protection zone) considerations.

Dr. Piirto, Doug

Silviculture Management Strategies for Pitch Canker Infected Ano Nuevo Stands of Monterey Pine

Full Report

Pitch Canker (Fusarium subglutinans) has become a major cause of growth loss, mortality, and associated economic impacts in California Monterey pine forests. There remains a strong need for science-based forest management guidelines of the Monterey pine forest in California given the high public interest and concern over the spread of pitch canker and the decline of the Monterey pine forest. An opportunity exists to develop long-term Monterey pine forest management studies for pitch canker infected native stands at California Polytechnic State University's forest property in Santa Cruz County.

Funding was provided by the California Department of Forestry and Fire Protection to: 1) initiate long-term forest management studies in the native Monterey pine forests at Swanton Pacific; and 2) develop guidelines for regeneration and management of Monterey pine forests in California in the presence of pitch canker. The research work is being done in collaboration with a number of institutions, organizations, research scientists, and graduate student.

An initial ARI grant was awarded to cover the first three of six proposed objectives: 1) install a Continuous Forest Inventory System for the Scotts Creek Study Area; 2) collect seed from Monterey pine pitch canker resistant trees; 3) plant this resistant seed in greenhouse nurseries; $0 outplant these resistant seedlings as part of the group selection experimental design; 5) evaluate the effectiveness of broadcast seeding; and 6) develop a model to visually characterize the influence of pitch canker on Monterey pine stands.

Dr. Mark, Walter

Sudden Oak Death Distribution, Detection, Ecological Impact, Control, and Spread Modeling

Full Report

In recent years, an alarming disease was found killing oaks in Marin County and has now spread to 10 surrounding counties. The cause of this disease was identified only last year to be a fungal pathogen Phytophthera ramorum. The disease this pathogen causes is called Sudden Oak Death (SOD).

Since 1995, SOD has been confirmed from southern Mendocino County to Big Sur, and is particularly severe in Marin, Santa Cruz, and Monterey Counties. Dying trees have been observed in urban and rural forests and woodlands. The main species of affected overstory plants are coast live oak, California black, and tanoak. The disease has also spread to Shreve's oak, California laurel, California buckeye, bigleaf maple, toyon, huckleberry, honeysuckle, rhododendrons, and arrowroot. Concern now exists that the pathogen may spread throughout California oak forests, be transported to the forests of other western states and even to the eastern United States. In fact SOD was discovered in Southern Oregon through aerial survey work in 2001. With the discovery of the pathogen on rhododendrons, there exists a much greater risk of human transport of the disease via ornamental plants. The actual current geographic range of SOD Phytophthera is unknown.

Project Objectives include

1) Statewide Survey of Extent of SOD-this will result in a comprehensive analysis and reporting of the extent of SOD in the State.

2) Predicting SOD Spread using GIS and Remote Sensing: A GIS model will be developed that will be verified by continued monitoring of the spread of SOD. At the end of the project a predictive spread model will be available. Landscape effects will also be modeled to show the impact of SOD on landscapes.

3) Ecological Consequences of SOD progression in oak woodlands: This data will become incorporated into the GIS model and will show the impact of SOD on oak ecosystems.

4) Testing of Existing Phytophthora Control Compounds: Efficacy testing will determine if a compound has the potential to be utilized to control SOD.

Development of Pitch Canker Resistant Stock of Monterey Pine, Ano Nuevo Stand

Major Objective (s): 1.) to install a Continuous Forest Inventory and associated baseline for the Scotts Creek area; 2.) collect seed from pitch canker resistant trees; 3.) plant this resistant seed in greenhouse nurseries; 4.) outplant resistant tree seedlings as part of a CDF funded group selection experimental design; 5.) develop a growth model for that will enable us to visually characterize the influence of pitch canker on stands.

(CSIRO-FFP Client Report No. 1581)

Establishment Report for the IMPACT P. radiata Pitch Canker Resistance Trial

Phase 2 of the IMPACT Project has begun. Agreements were put in place before the beginning of July 2004 by which time additional seedlots had been sent to the USDA Forest Service, Institute of Forest Genetics (IFG). Seedlots from among those tested in Phase 1 (greenhouse) were selected and the additional seedlots representing reciprocal cross pairs were sent from CRSIO. Seedlots were germinated at IFG and shipped to the California Polytechnic State University planting site near Ano Nuevo where they were planted on 12 February 2005.

== Educational opportunities ==
Students collecting streamflow data

A variety of educational programs are available at Swanton Pacific Ranch, including residential programs for Cal Poly SLO students in the areas of forest management, resource management, watershed management, livestock management, crop specialist, horticultural specialist and integrated ranch management. There are opportunities for senior projects in all agriculture and natural resource areas. The Ranch provides the opportunity for student field trips and short training courses serving students, faculty, staff and others. Another component of the educational program is FNR 475 (Sustainable Forestry and Environmental Practices). This is a field based course offered for credit during the summer quarter. Interns working and living at the ranch have as part of their responsibilities a community service component. Each intern selects the type of community service they would like to be involved in, and the ranch assists them by providing this service time. Interns have been involved in beach clean up, trail maintenance and educational programs in local schools. There is also an opportunity for graduate level projects in Forestry and Agriculture. Each year Cal Poly SLO holds Al Smith Day at Swanton Pacific Ranch. The events include a barbecue, roping demonstrations and train rides. The Cal Poly SLO logging team also performs axe throwing and cross cutting. Many of the local schools participate in this fun educational day.
