= Scott Creek (Santa Cruz County) =

Scott Creek Scotts Creek, Arroyo de Jairo, Arroyo de Jarro

Location
- Country: United States
- State: California
- Region: Santa Cruz County
- City: Swanton

Physical characteristics
- Source: Big Basin Redwoods State Park
  - location: Santa Cruz Mountains
  - coordinates: 37°09′05″N 122°11′57″W
  - elevation: 1,736 ft (529 m)
- Mouth: Pacific Ocean
  - coordinates: 37°02′31″N 122°13′37″W
  - elevation: 13 ft (4.0 m)

Basin features
- Tributaries
  - left: Mill Creek (Santa Cruz County), Big Creek (Santa Cruz County), Little Creek (Santa Cruz County), Winter Creek, Archibald Creek

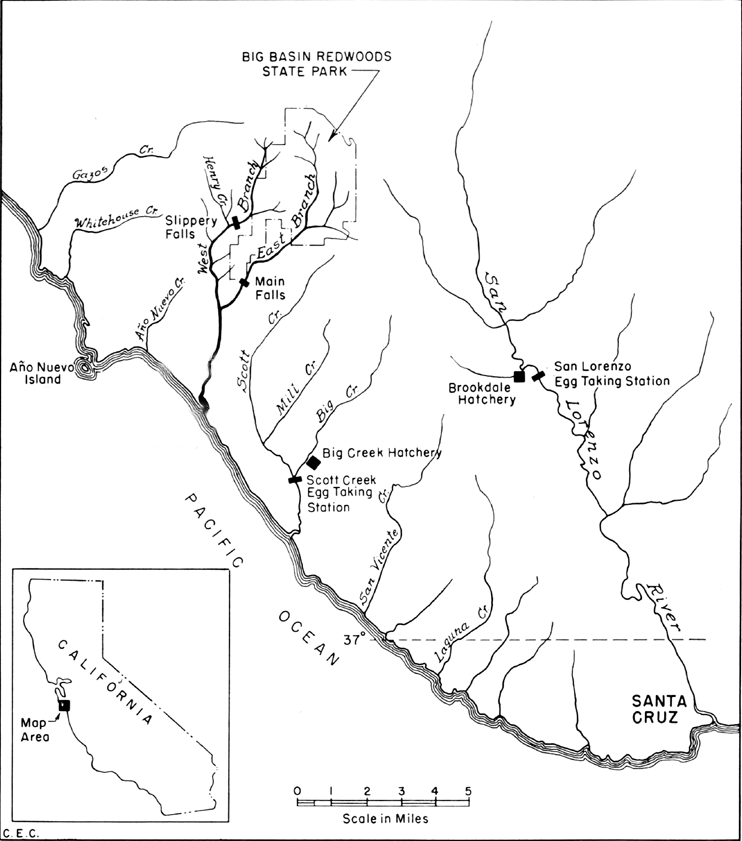
1954 Map of Waddell Creek, Scott Creek and San Lorenzo River

Scott Creek, also called Scotts Creek, is a 12.2-mile-long (19.6 km) stream and surfspot in Santa Cruz County, California. It is a few miles north of Davenport and a few miles south of Waddell Creek.

== History ==
The first European land exploration of Alta California, the Spanish Portolà expedition, traveled along the coast on its way north, and again on the return. The party camped on the hill above the confluence of Scott Creek and Molino Creek - in sight of the beach - on October 19, 1769. On the return journey to San Diego, the party camped at the same location on November 20. Franciscan missionary Juan Crespi noted in his diary, "At the foot of the hill run two very copious streams, one to the right and the other to the left."

Scott Creek is named for Hiram Scott, who in 1852 bought part of the Rancho Agua Puerca y las Trancas. Scott, for whom Scotts Valley is also named, bought Rancho San Agustin (now Scotts Valley) in the same year.

== Watershed ==
Scott Creek is a small coastal California watershed draining approximately 75 square miles (190 km^{2}). It empties into the Pacific Ocean 80 kilometres (50 mi) south of San Francisco. Large waterfalls form impassable barriers on each of the main tributaries.

== Ecology ==
Anadromous steelhead trout (Oncorhynchus mykiss) and coho salmon (Oncorhynchus kisutch) can access approximately 14.3 miles (23.0 km) of stream between the estuary and natural upstream barriers of the main stem and the three main tributaries, Little, Big, and Mill creeks. In 1995 a review of coho south of San Francisco Bay found coho restricted to only one remnant population in Waddell Creek, one small naturalized (hatchery-influenced) population in Scott Creek and a small hatchery-maintained, non-native run in the San Lorenzo River, all in Santa Cruz County. Historically, coho were found in approximately 50 coastal drainages in San Mateo and Santa Cruz counties, but by the 1960s spawning runs were limited to 11 stream systems. The 1995 combined average annual spawning population of native and naturalized coho salmon in Waddell and Scott Creeks was estimated at only 50-60 adults, comprising only 1.5% of the estimated abundance of coho salmon south of San Francisco Bay in the early 1960s. Coho have returned as a result of stocking efforts at the Kingfisher Flat Hatchery on Scott Creek's Big Creek tributary.

Fishes of Scott Creek include steelhead, coho salmon, threespine stickleback (Gasterosteus aculeatus), prickly sculpin (Cottus asper), Coastrange sculpin (Cottus aleuticus), and tidewater goby (Eucyclogobius newberryi). Juvenile starry flounder (Platichthys stellatus) and Pacific staghorn sculpin (Leptocottus armatus) are infrequently observed in the estuary.

The steelhead and coho salmon hatchery on Big Creek is operated by The Monterey Bay Salmon and Trout Project (MBSTP). The hatchery uses spawning wild steelhead trout to obtain eggs and milt so that the genetics of the hatchery fish are wild. The hatchery site was historically known as Kingfisher Flats.

The lower Scott Creek watershed flows through the 3,200 acres (1,300 hectares) Swanton Pacific Ranch, managed by California Polytechnic State University.

== Recreation ==
On big north swells that occur during the winter, a large bowly right is enjoyed by many surfers. The spot has similarities to Swami's surfspot in San Diego County. The beach is also frequented by nudists.
