= Lockheed Fire =

2009 wildfire in California

- Part of the 2009 California wildfires
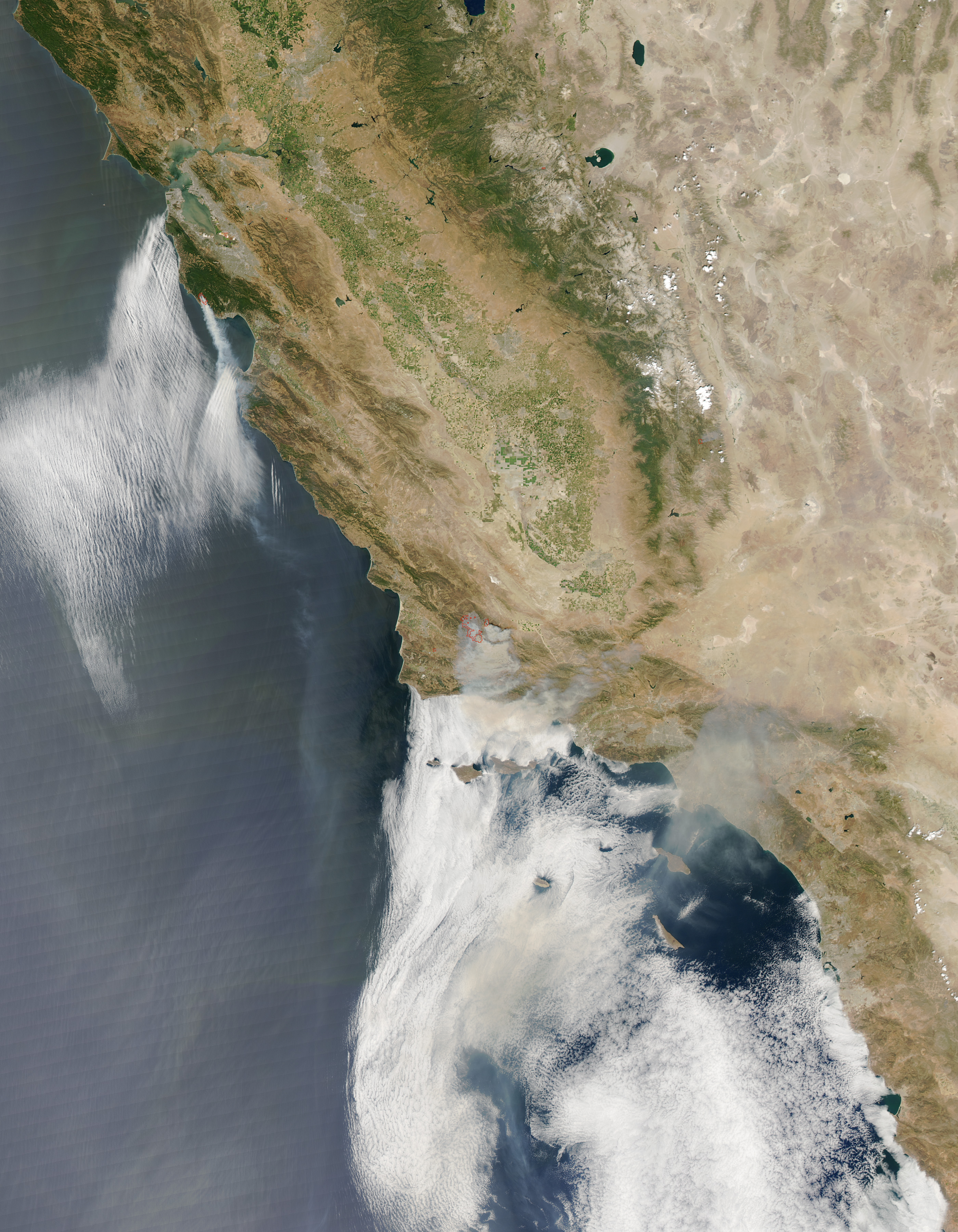
- Smoke rises from multiple fires as seen on 15 August 2009.
- Date: August 12, 2009 –; August 23, 2009
- Location: Bonny Doon Ecological Reserve, Santa Cruz, California

Statistics
- Burned area: 7,817 acres (3,163 ha)

Impacts
- Injuries: 10
- Structures lost: 13
- Cost: $26.6 million

The Lockheed Fire was a wildfire in the Santa Cruz Mountains in the Swanton and Bonny Doon areas of Santa Cruz County, California. The fire was started on August 12, 2009 at 7:16 PM PDT.

A Red Cross shelter was established at Vintage Faith Church in Santa Cruz for families who were evacuated from the area. An animal evacuation center was also established at the Santa Cruz County Fairgrounds.

Many resources were demanded for this fire. The steep terrain and lack of road access in the area made it difficult to fight the blaze.

The cause of the fire was determined to be an out of control or unattended camp fire.
