= Guiberson Fire =

2009 wildfire in Southern California

- Part of the 2009 California wildfires
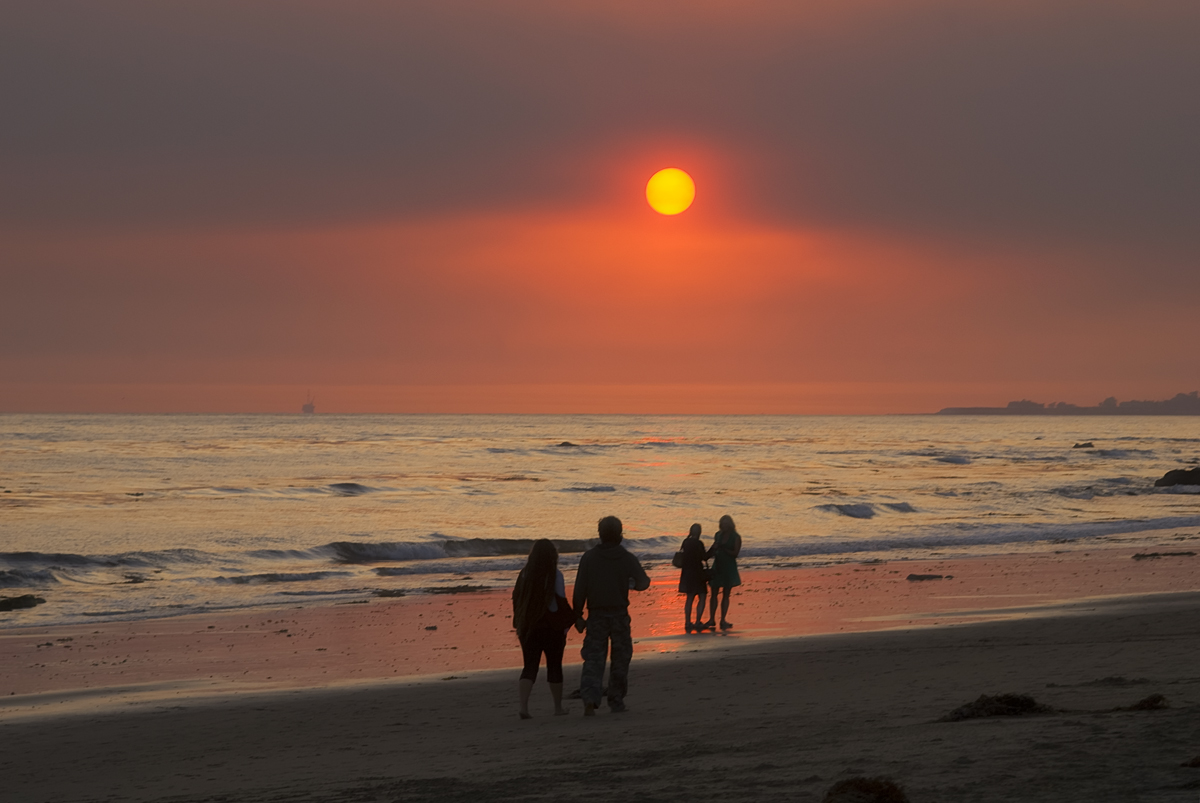
- Smoke from the Guiberson Fire tints the sunset viewed from Santa Barbara
- Date: September 22, 2009 –; September 27, 2009
- Location: Guiberson Canyon, Santa Susana Mountains, Ventura County, California

Statistics
- Burned area: 17,500 acres (71 km^{2})

Impacts
- Structures destroyed: 1

The Guiberson Fire was a wildfire that burned from September 22 until September 27, 2009 in Guiberson Canyon of the western Santa Susana Mountains, between Fillmore and Moorpark in Ventura County, California.

== The fire ==
The Guiberson Fire, which started between Fillmore and Moorpark, caused the evacuation of almost 600 homes in Meridian Hills and Bardsdale with about 1,000 structures threatened, in addition to oil pipelines in the area. The cause of the fire is still unknown.

The fire destroyed an estimated 17,500 acres (71 km^{2}), destroying an outbuilding and injuring 10 firefighters. On day two of the fire Governor Schwarzenegger declared a state of emergency.

== See also ==
- 2009 California wildfires
