= Swanton Pacific Railroad =

Coordinates: 37°03′47″N 122°13′38″W

The Swanton Pacific Railroad Society operated an historic one-third scale, 19 in (483 mm) gauge, railroad at Swanton Pacific Ranch in Davenport, California, 15 miles (24 km) north of Santa Cruz, California. The one-mile (1.6 km)-long railroad lies along the Ocean Shore Railroad right-of-way that was to run from San Francisco to Santa Cruz. The scenic trip, through a valley in the coastal mountains, crosses Scott Creek on the Ed Carnegie Bridge, passes a Christmas tree farm, and ends at a wye where passengers observe railroad operations that turn the locomotive.

Swanton Pacific Railroad (SPRR) equipment and facilities included:

- Four steam locomotives and one original passenger car from the 1915 Panama–Pacific International Exposition's Overfair Railway in San Francisco.
- Reconstructed cars made of Overfair Railway parts and equipment from the 1975 Calistoga Railroad
- GE U25B Diesel locomotive 1:3 replica and cars built in 1963 by the Keystone Light Railway Products Company in Pennsylvania
- Roundhouse, turntable, car barn, machine shop, and workshop
- Four full-size cabooses, one of which was founder Al Smith's office at Orchard Supply Hardware
- California Polytechnic State University (Cal Poly) projects include a railroad crane, a car for passengers with disabilities, and a train station.

Swanton Pacific's (SP) "Lazy Espee" brand also acknowledges the Southern Pacific Railroad, one of Al Smith's former employers.

== Albert B. Smith, SPR founder ==
In 1979, railroad enthusiast Albert B. "Al" Smith began collecting the steam locomotives and equipment from the 1915 Panama–Pacific International Exposition Overfair Railway. With the help of many volunteers, he built the Swanton Pacific Railroad on his ranch. He donated the Overfair locomotive that is on permanent display in the lobby of the California State Railroad Museum in Sacramento. Smith was also associated with Roaring Camp & Big Trees Narrow Gauge Railroad in Felton, and the Billy Jones Wildcat Railroad in Los Gatos, and both railroads have locomotives named for him.

Smith earned degrees in Crop Science and Agriculture Education from Cal Poly, San Luis Obispo. Following a long teaching career at Campbell High School (California), he succeeded his father as president of Orchard Supply Hardware. He also held leadership roles in Boy Scouts, Rotary Club, and the Town Council of Los Gatos, California.

His interests in railroading, education, and community service culminated in his 1993 legacy gift of the railroad and 3,200-acre (1,300-hectare) Swanton Pacific Ranch to Cal Poly. This gift preserves his desire to provide people with an opportunity to experience and learn from the past, prepare for the future, and participate in Cal Poly's principle of "Learn by Doing".

== 2020 fires ==
In 2020 the site was damaged by the CZU Lightning Complex fires. The wildfire scorched tracks, historic buildings and three of the original engines.

On December 2, 2022, the landowner, Cal Poly University, announced "the railroad does not fit within the strategic intent of the [land]", explaining its decision to abandon the efforts to rebuild the railroad. The railroad will be permanently closed, its equipment donated, and the land will be refocused towards "educational pursuits".
