= San Mateo Creek =

San Mateo Creek can refer to two creeks in California:

- San Mateo Creek (San Francisco Bay Area)
- San Mateo Creek (Southern California)
