= Filoli =

Historic house in California, United States

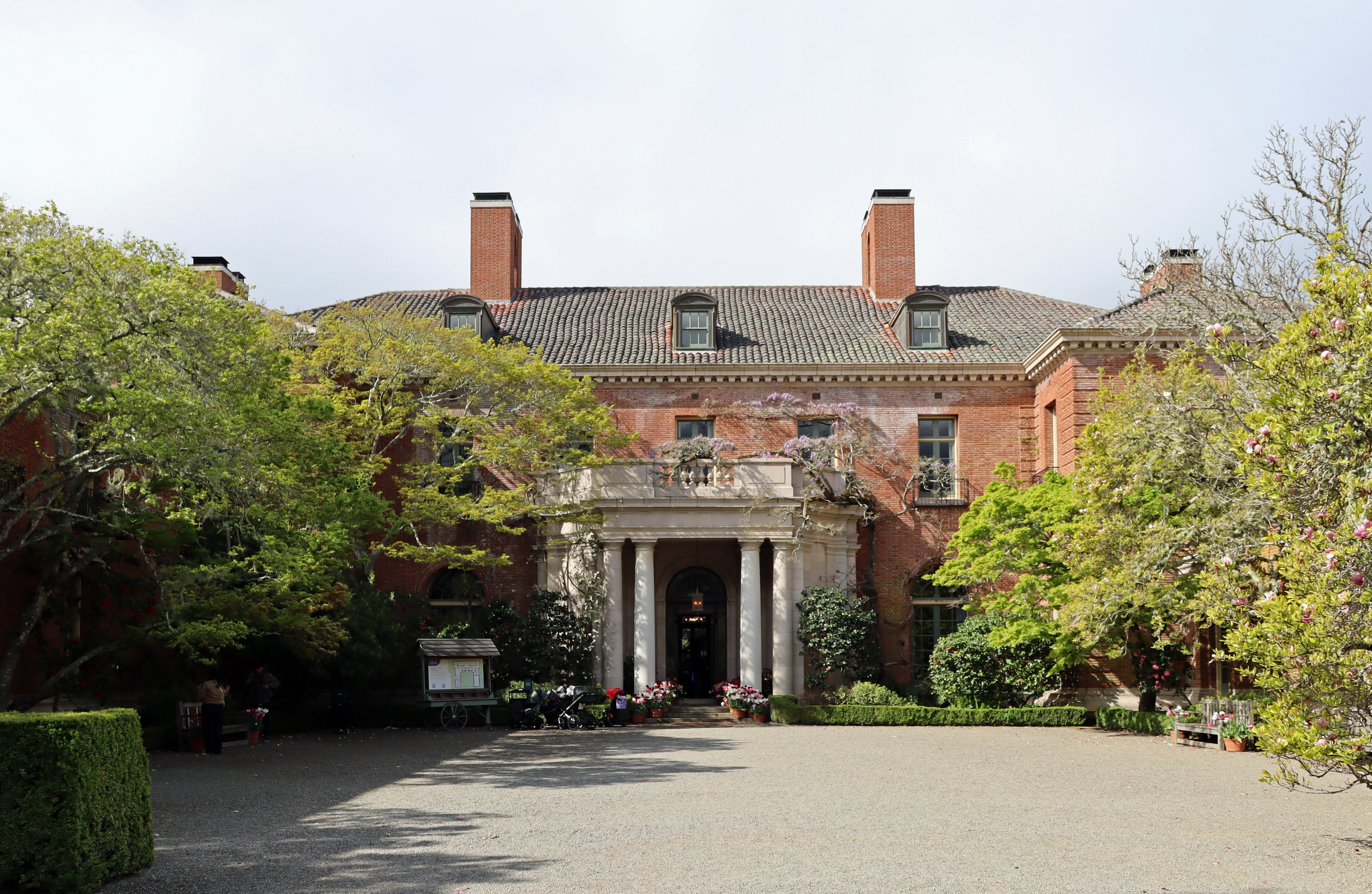
- Exterior of Filoli, used as the Carrington Mansion on the television series Dynasty

- Location within California Location within the United States
- 37.4704°N 122.310703°W
- Location: 86 Cañada Road, Woodside, California

History
- Built: 1915
- Built for: William Bowers Bourn II

Site notes
- Architect: Willis Polk
- Architectural style: Georgian Revival
- Governing body: National Trust for Historic Preservation
- Website: filoli.org

U.S. National Register of Historic Places
- Official name: Bourn-Roth Estate
- Designated: August 28, 1975
- Reference no.: 75000479

California Historical Landmark
- Designated: February 8, 1977
- Reference no.: 907

Filoli, also known as the Bourn-Roth Estate, is a country house set in 16 acres (6.5 ha) of formal gardens surrounded by a 654-acre (265 ha) estate, located in Woodside, California, about 25 miles (40 km) south of San Francisco, at the southern end of Crystal Springs Reservoir, on the eastern slope of the Santa Cruz Mountains. Now owned by the private, nonprofit National Trust for Historic Preservation, Filoli is open to the public. The site is both a California Historical Landmark and listed on the National Register of Historic Places.

== History ==
=== Bourn family ===
Filoli was built between 1915 and 1917 for William Bowers Bourn II, owner of one of California's richest gold mines and president of Spring Valley Water Company, which supplied San Francisco's water, and his wife, Agnes Moody Bourn. They wanted a country estate nearer to their home in San Francisco. The principal designer, San Francisco architect Willis Polk, used a free Georgian style that incorporated the tiled roofs characteristic of California. Polk had previously designed Bourn's houses in Grass Valley and on Webster Street in San Francisco. Polk's friend, artist and designer Bruce Porter, was commissioned to collaborate with the Bourns in planning the gardens, which were laid out between 1917 and 1922. The horticulturist who designed the plantings and fixed the original color schemes was Isabella Worn; she supervised the garden's maintenance for 35 years.

Filoli served as one of the Bourns' residences from 1917 to 1936. The name of the estate is an acronym formed by combining the first two letters from the key words of William Bourn's credo: "Fight for a just cause; Love your fellow man; Live a good life."

Bourn's Spring Valley Water Company owned Crystal Springs Reservoir and the surrounding area. Bourn called the Crystal Springs Reservoirs "Spring Valley Lakes" for his company. The original Spring Valley was between Mason and Taylor Streets, and Washington and Broadway Streets in San Francisco, where the water company started. When the company went south for more water, the Spring Valley name was carried south too.

Bourn also owned Muckross House in Ireland and is reputed to have used Muckross as a model for Filoli.

=== Roth family and National Trust for Historic Preservation ===
Following the deaths of William and Agnes Bourn in 1936, the estate was sold the following year to Mr. William P. Roth and Mrs. Lurline Matson Roth, heiress to the Matson Navigation Company. The Roth family built Filoli's botanic collections of camellias, rhododendrons and azaleas, notably in the Woodland Garden, and added the serene swimming pool and the screened-in teahouse. In 1975, Mrs. Roth donated the estate in its entirety to the National Trust for Historic Preservation, with an endowment that helps support annual operating expenses.

In 2023, Filoli hosted the first meeting on U.S. soil in several years between U.S. President Joe Biden and General Secretary of the Chinese Communist Party Xi Jinping on the sidelines of the 2023 APEC summit in San Francisco. The two world leaders met at Filoli on November 15, 2023, during Xi's visit to California. Although Filoli had been popular for many years with Asian tourists visiting the San Francisco Bay Area (due to its gardens and its prominent appearance in the opening credits of the television series Dynasty), the extensive press coverage of the Xi-Biden meeting led to a surge of interest among both Chinese and Chinese American tourists.

== Management ==
The estate operates as Filoli Center, a private, non-profit organization with its own Board of Governors, staff, and volunteers. As of 2022, Filoli was drawing about 400,000 visitors per year. In 2024, Filoli saw almost 490,000 visitors, and drew $22.3 million in revenue.

== House ==
The house is 54,256 square feet (5,040.5 m^{2}) in size, and has a total of 56 rooms. This includes a ballroom, a reception room, a dining room, cozier family rooms, and servants quarters. While the home was empty when it reached the National Trust, much of the original furniture and art has been donated, to help recreate the original appearance of the home. This is an ongoing effort; in 2022 the gentleman's lounge was restructured to include new period-typical additions to the room and add a re-creation of the original wallpaper.

== Library ==
Filoli houses two libraries with resources related to the families and the estate: the Friends Library Collection and the Sterling Library Collection. The Friends Library is a circulation library that holds 1,500 books, 125 videos, lectures, or oral histories, and several copies of movies filmed on the estate. The Sterling Library is a research library with 1,800 books and 40 journals. Both libraries are only open to Filoli members or to researchers.

== Gardens ==
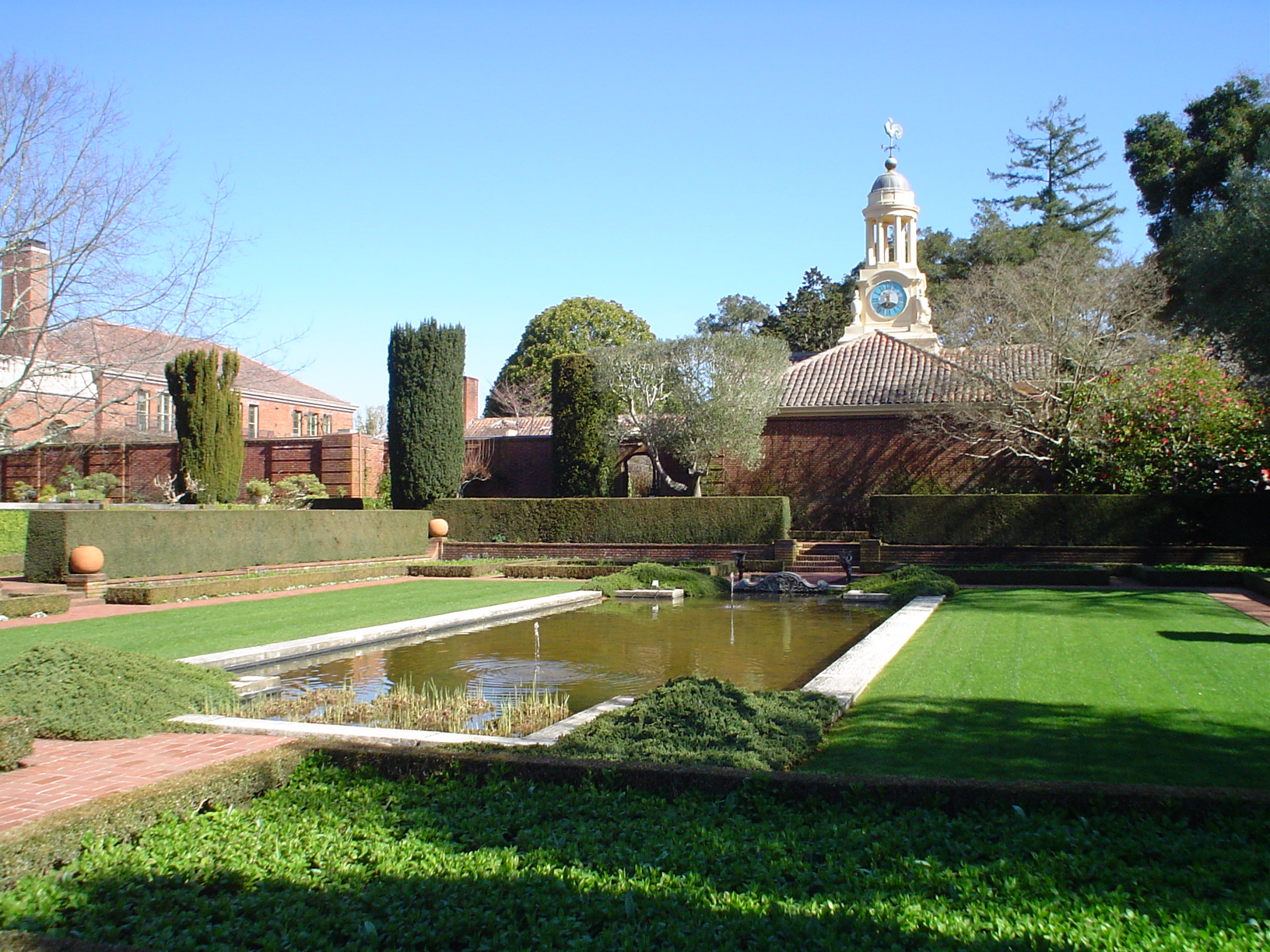
Reflecting pool and former carriage house.

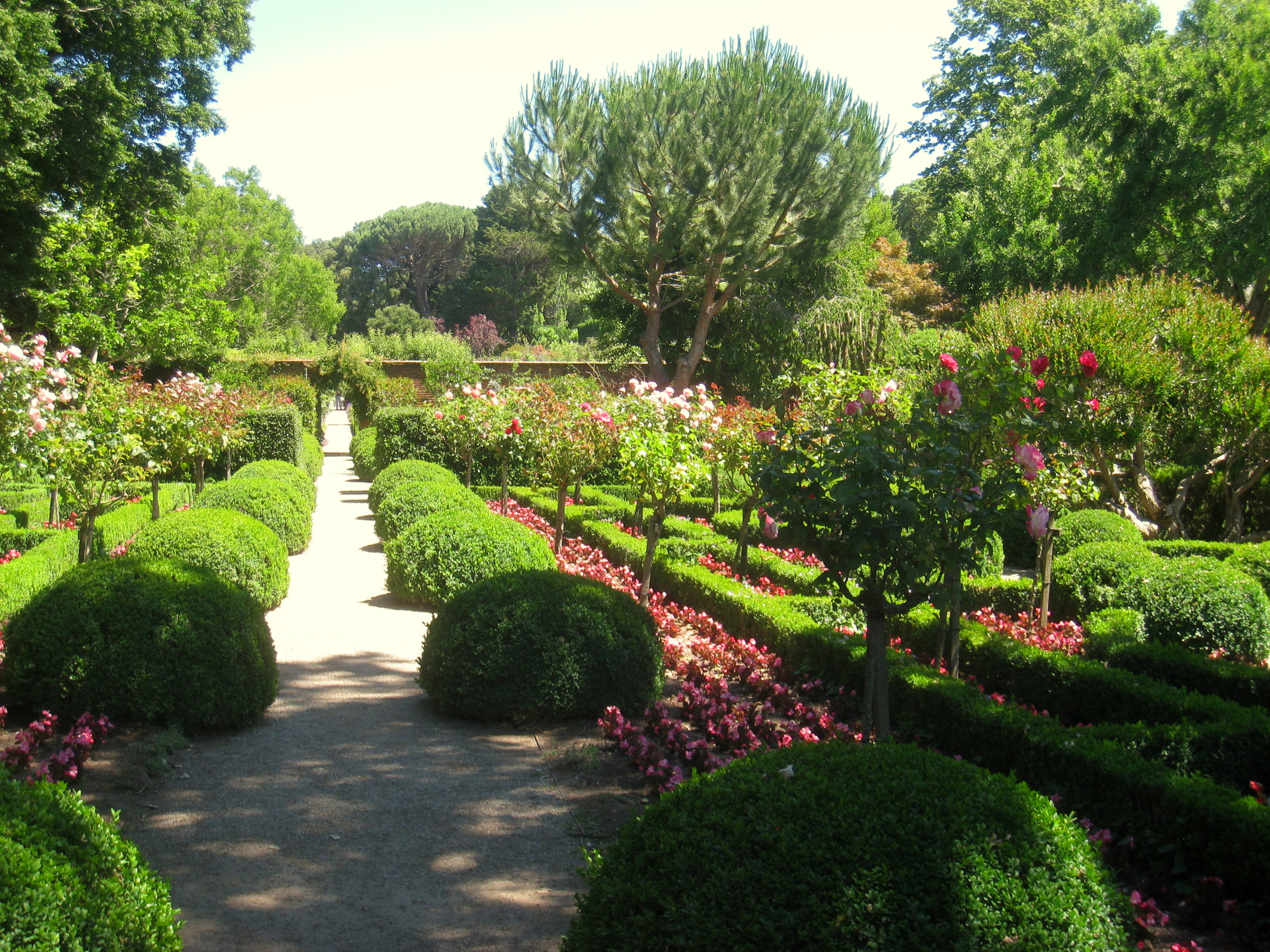
The Chartres Garden

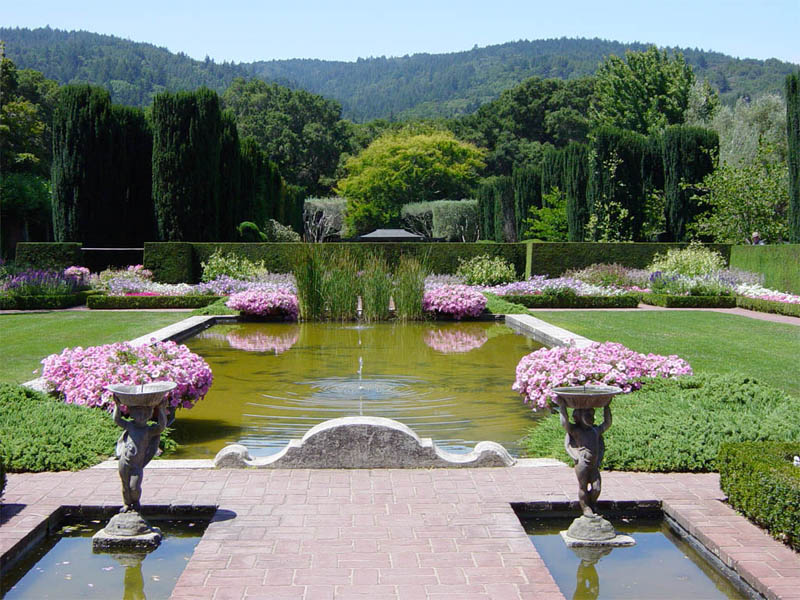
The Sunken Garden

The 16 acres (6.5 ha) of gardens are structured as a series of formally enclosed spaces framed by brick walls and clipped hedges, which open one from another, providing long axial views, in which profuse naturalized plantings of hardy and annual plants contrast with lawns, brick and gravel paths, formal reflecting pools, framed in walls and clipped hedging in box, holly, laurel, and yew (illustration, right) and punctuated by massive terracotta pots and many narrowly columnar Irish yews, originally grown on the estate from cuttings. Filoli is an outstanding example of the Anglo-American gardening style reintroducing Italian formality, that was pioneered at the end of the nineteenth century by Edwin Lutyens and Gertrude Jekyll in British gardens and exemplified in the U.S. by designs of Charles A. Platt and Beatrix Farrand.

The gardens extend southeast of the house running up an easy slope. The sunken garden is the first of four main rooms; the rectangular pool at its center that houses hardy and tropical water lilies is flanked by twin panels of lawn and two olive trees, within the hedge of clipped Japanese yew. The walled garden consists of a series of enclosures, including the stained glass window design outlined in clipped box.

After it was acquired by the National Trust for Historic Preservation in 1975, Filoli has been open for public tours. Attractions include self-guided tours, guided tours, and nature hikes.

The formal gardens include several areas, including the Wedding Place, named for Berenice Roth's wedding location in 1941. Lurline and Berenice both had their wedding receptions at Filoli, but Berenice's wedding is the only one that has ever taken place at Filoli when it was a private home. The largest gardens are working gardens for the production of cut flowers for the mansion and for the growing of some vegetables.

=== Orchard ===
Filoli Gentlemen's Orchard was started by Bourn family in the early 20th century, however the Roth family did not maintain the orchard and by the 1970s it was in poor condition. In 1997, the California Rare Fruit Growers began donating rare plants to restore the orchard. Many of the current 650+ trees in the orchard are lost varieties of fruit and include: 275 varieties of apple trees, 59 pear varieties, 42 peach varieties, 6 medlar, and many more.

== Ecology and conservation ==
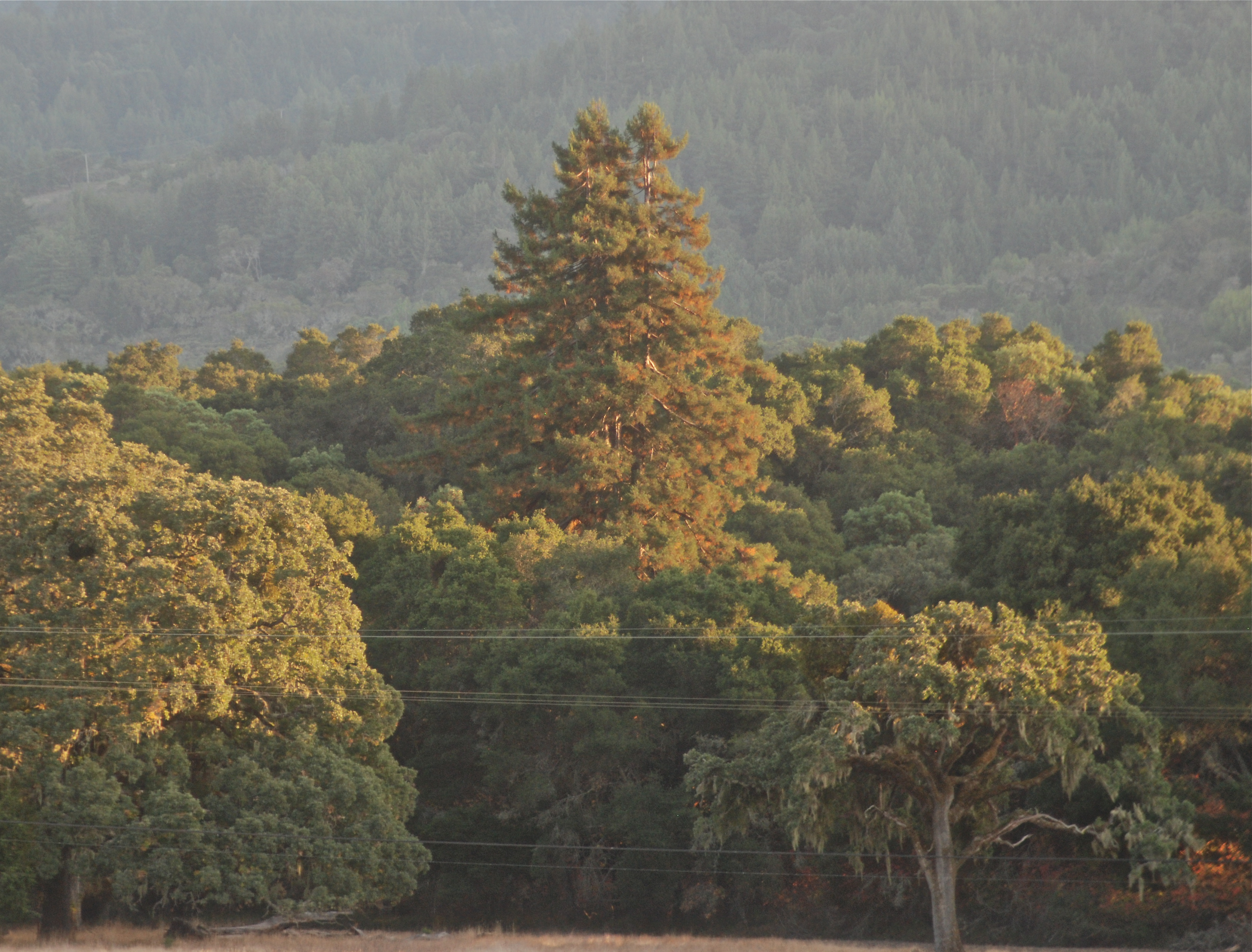
Coast redwoods (Sequoia sempervirens) on Laguna Creek tower over the oaks (just below Filoli's lower parking lot on main entrance road).

Laguna Creek, locally known as "Orchard Creek", flows northwest from its origin on the western slope of Edgewood County Park to Upper Crystal Springs Reservoir where its waters eventually join San Mateo Creek, and descend to San Francisco Bay. In November 1769, Laguna Creek was the route of the Portolà expedition as they descended from their discovery of San Francisco Bay on Sweeney Ridge down San Andreas Creek to Laguna Creek and then southeast down the San Francisquito Creek watershed to El Palo Alto. After crossing to the west side of Cañada Road, Laguna Creek is joined on the left (heading downstream) by the South Fork Laguna Creek, then after crossing under the main entrance road to Filoli it is joined by locally named Fault Creek, then Spring Creek (possibly named by Bourn for his Spring Valley Water Company), then on the right by an unnamed creek, then by waters from the Hetch Hetchy Aqueduct and Pulgas Water Temple just before entering Upper Crystal Springs Reservoir. Historically, the San Mateo Creek watershed hosted runs of anadromous salmonids, including coho salmon (Oncorhynchus kisutch) and steelhead trout (coastal rainbow trout) (Oncorhynchus mykiss irideus) coming up from the Bay. In 1877, Laguna Grande, a natural lake on Laguna Creek, was dammed with an earthen causeway (now crossed by Highway 92) blocking further salmonid migration up into Laguna Creek and its tributaries on Filoli. Stream resident rainbow trout (Oncorhynchus mykiss), continue to run up the creeks of Filoli from the reservoir to spawn.

San Mateo County historian Frank Stanger cited sizeable groves of redwoods (Sequoia sempervirens) in the Laguna Creek watershed. In the area around Filoli he described two historic lumber mills. The historic "Smith Mill" on Fault Creek was destroyed by fire in 1854. Pinckney's mill in "the largest gulch", which would be Spring Creek, was built in 1855 and later purchased by S. L. Mastic. Although information on these mills is limited, they support the idea that "the area was thoroughly logged". A large redwood tree remains on Laguna Creek just below the lower Filoli parking lot and on the main entrance road.

=== Lamchin Interpretive Center and Trails ===
There are two nature trails behind the formal gardens at Filoli, the California Trail and the Spring Creek Trail.

==== California Trail (former Estate Trail) ====
In 2017, Filoli added The Estate Trail, a one mile loop which gives visitors the opportunity to walk through the outer nature preserve of Filoli. In 2024 it was renamed The California Trail. This trail passes through the horse pasture, a field of native plants, the former horse barn, and a bridge over Fault Creek and the San Andreas Fault, which cuts through the property. This trail leads to a former barn that was turned into the Sally MacBride Nature Center, but was renamed the Lamchin Interpretive Center in collaboration with the Ramaytush Ohlone.

==== Spring Creek Trail ====
Behind the Lamchin Interpretive Center the new Spring Creek Trail opened in June 2024. This half-mile trail climbs 125 feet and includes a new bridge over Spring Creek, leading to a man-made flume and pond where Bourn stored water for his gardens.

== Film location ==
Filoli has served as the set for many Hollywood films. Most famously, it is the mansion seen from the air in the opening credits of the television series Dynasty. The mansion's plush interiors were also featured in the first episodes of the series but were subsequently replicated on sound stages at the Fox Studios, Century City. The entire mansion served as the setting for the 2006 CBS Television special Dynasty Reunion: Catfights & Caviar in which cast members reunited to discuss their memories of the series. It was the first time many of the cast members had been to the actual estate.

The estate is featured as a central location in the Warren Beatty film Heaven Can Wait.

Filoli was featured in Bob Vila's A&E Network production Guide to Historic Homes of America as well as in a November 1996 segment of A&E's America's Castles: Garden Estates, the latter being shown continuously at the visitor center.

The house also served as the Stanhope residence in the 1997 film George of the Jungle, and was featured in The Game in the same year.

The house was used in the 2005 film adaptation of the musical Rent, for the engagement party scene for Idina Menzel and Tracie Thoms character's Maureen Johnson and Joanne Jefferson, notably their immediate breakup song Take Me Or Leave Me.

== Gallery ==
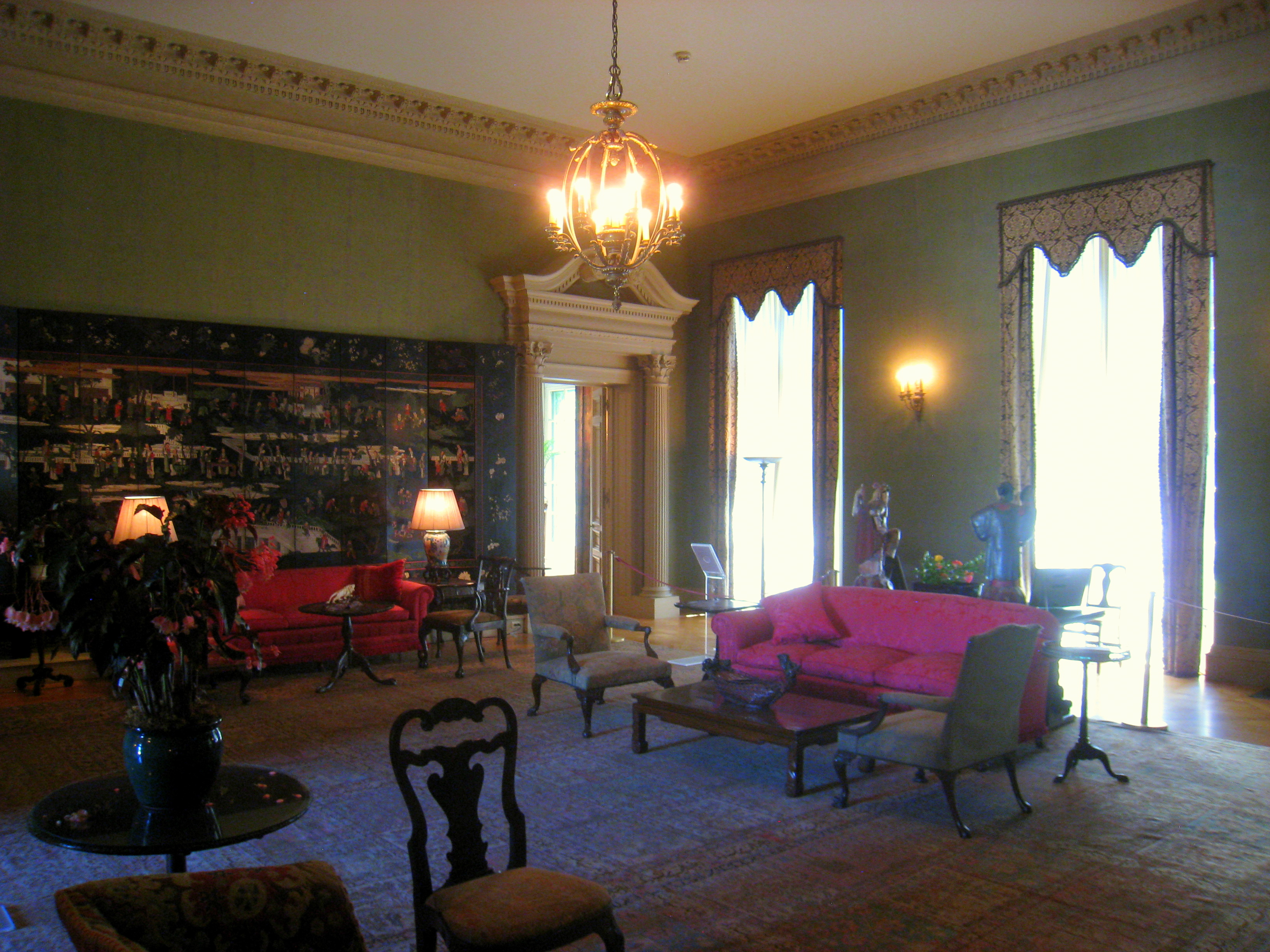
Reception Room

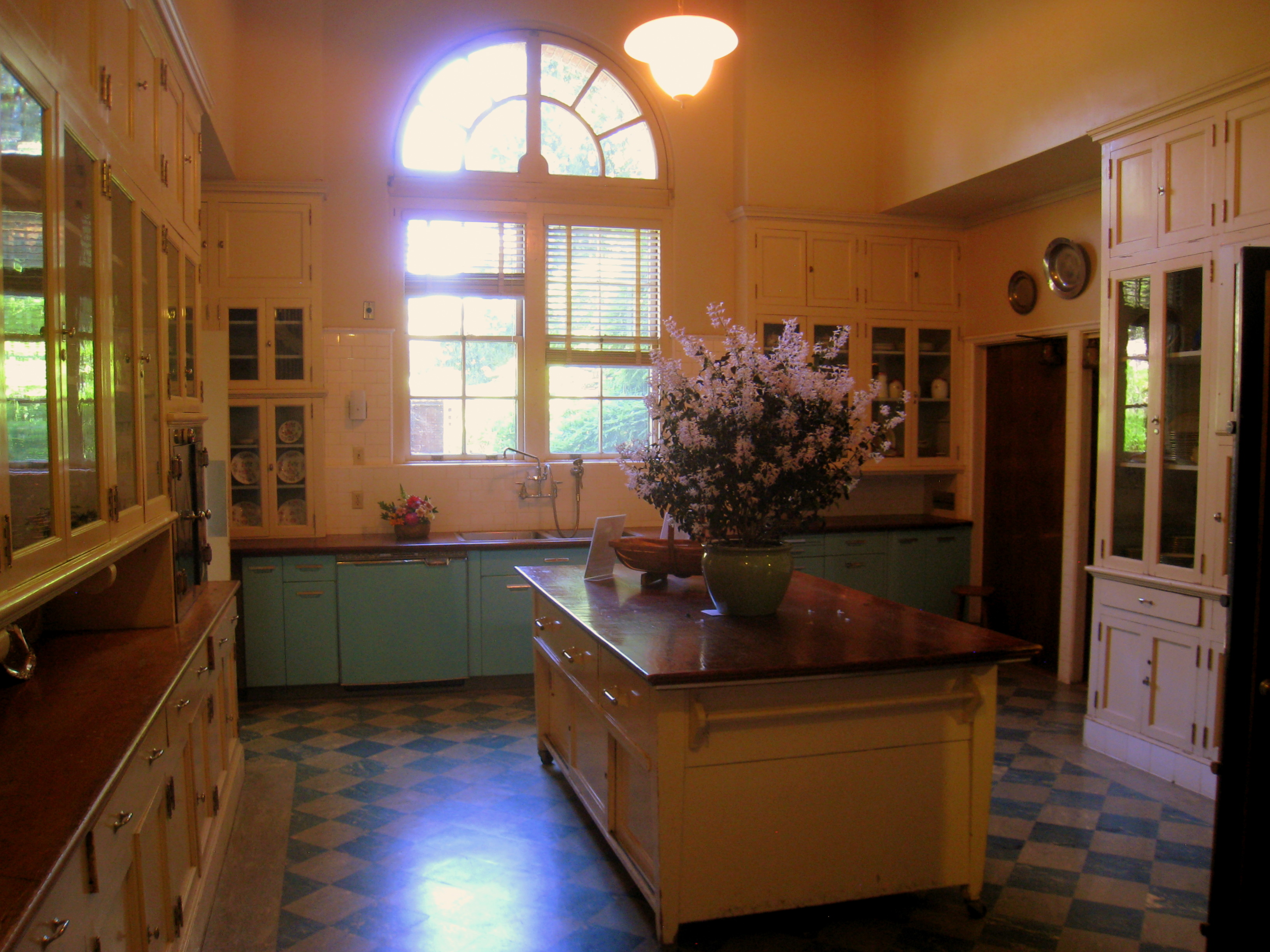
Kitchen

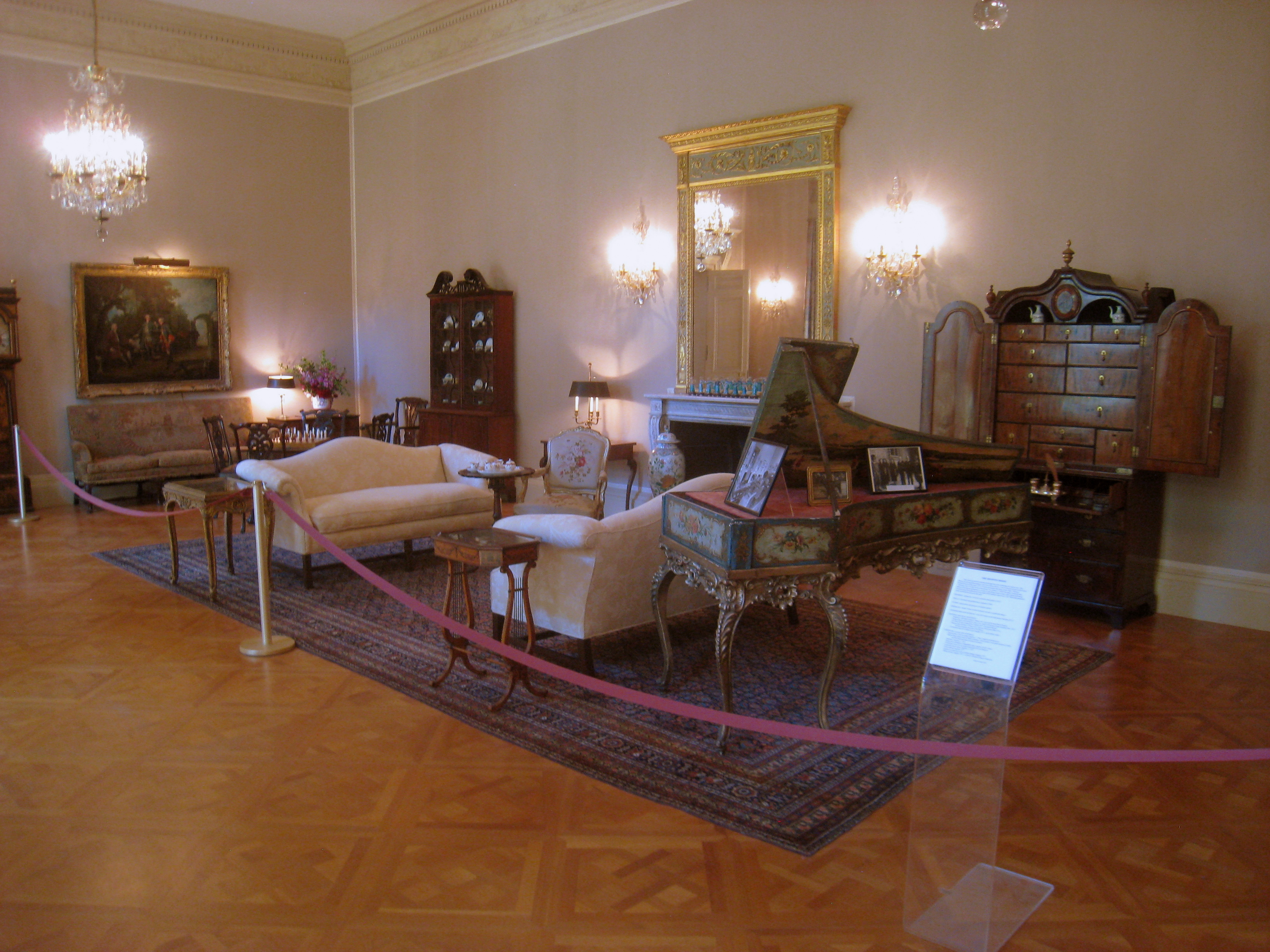
Drawing Room

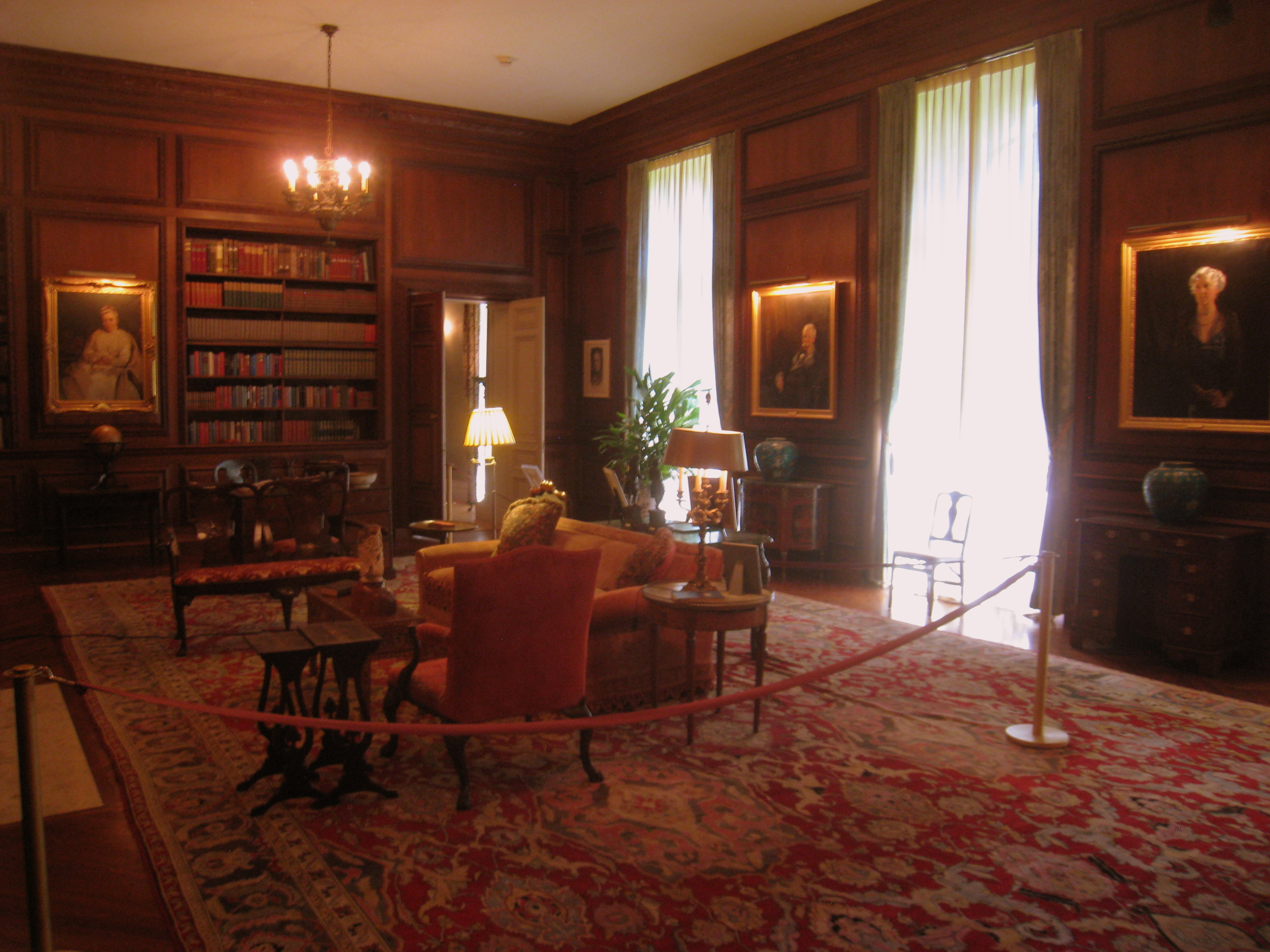
Library

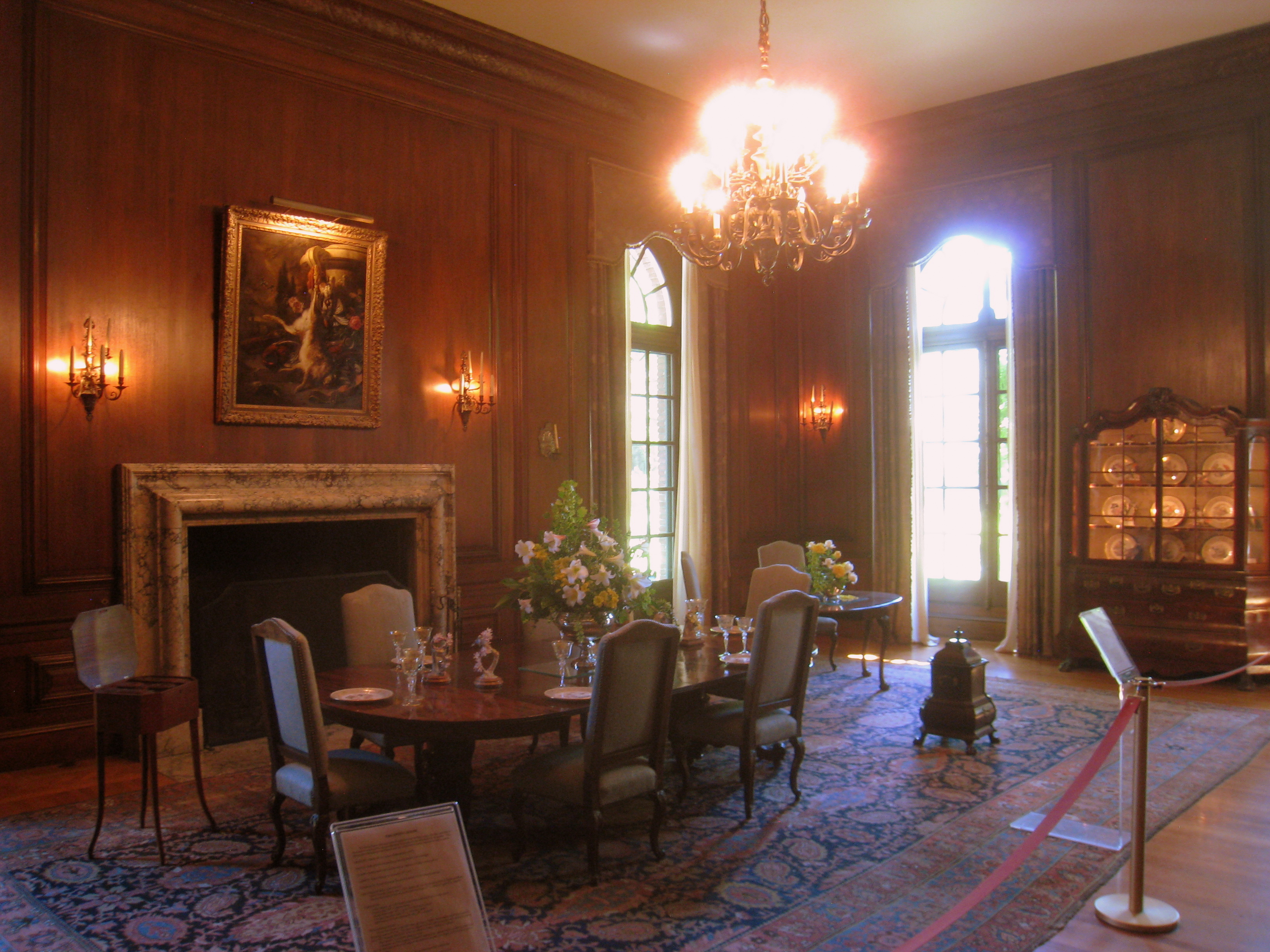
Dining Room

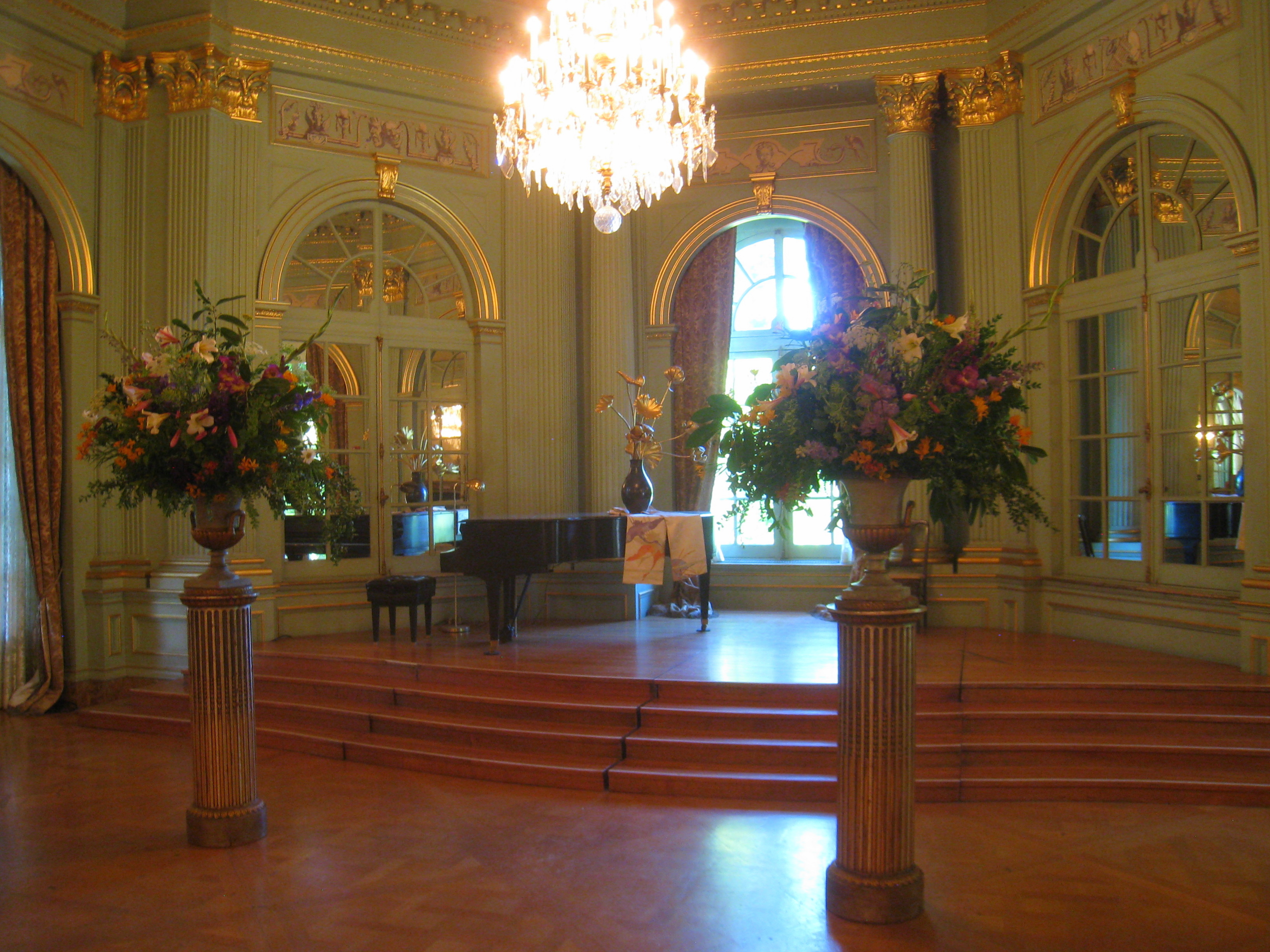
Ballroom

== See also ==
- National Trust for Historic Preservation – historic sites
- List of botanical gardens in the United States
