= Laguna Creek (San Mateo County) =

Laguna Creek Lake Creek Cañada Raimundo Creek
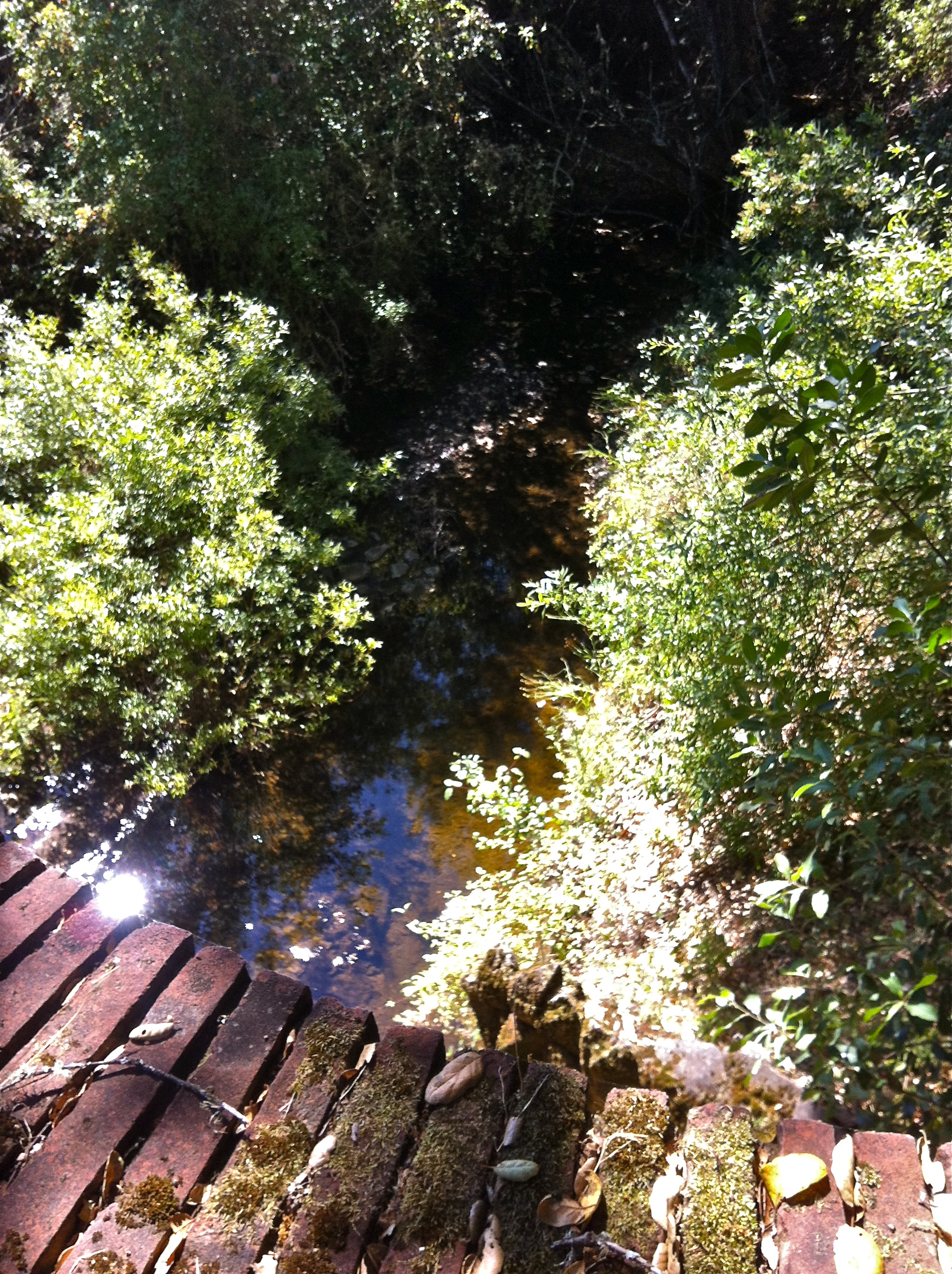
- Laguna Creek has perennial pools as shown here looking upstream from South Bridge at Filoli, mid-August 2012.

Location
- Country: United States
- State: California
- Region: San Francisco Peninsula
- County: San Mateo County

Physical characteristics
- Source
  - location: Edgewood County Park
  - coordinates: 37°27′48″N 122°17′10″W
  - elevation: 630 ft (190 m)
- Mouth: Confluence with Upper Crystal Springs Reservoir (but historically with San Mateo Creek)
  - coordinates: 37°28′57″N 122°19′19″W
  - elevation: 285 ft (87 m)

Basin features
- Tributaries
  - left: South Fork Laguna Creek, West Fork Laguna Creek, Fault Creek, Spring Creek, Adobe Gulch
  - right: Hetch Hetchy Aqueduct

Laguna Creek is a perennial stream that flows northwesterly for 2.6 miles (4.2 km) along the San Andreas Fault from Woodside in San Mateo County, California and, after crossing the Phleger Estate and Filoli, enters Upper Crystal Springs Reservoir, where it is a historic tributary to San Mateo Creek. San Mateo Creek then carries its waters over Crystal Springs Dam northeast to San Francisco Bay.

== History ==
After discovering San Francisco Bay from Sweeney Ridge on November 4, 1769, the Portolà expedition descended on what Portolà called the Cañada de San Francisco, now known as San Andreas Creek, to its confluence with San Mateo Creek. Just downstream from here was Laguna Creek's confluence with San Mateo Creek. Crossing San Mateo Creek just above its canyon, Portola's party proceeded south along Laguna Creek and camped on a lake which Portolà called Laguna Grande (Spanish for 'Great Lake'), now covered by Upper Crystal Springs Reservoir. The campsite is marked by California Historical Marker No. 94, "Portola Expedition Camp", located at Crystal Springs Dam, on Skyline Boulevard, 0.1 mi (0.16 km) south of Crystal Springs Road. Then Portola continued south and descended from the foothills along San Francisquito Creek to established his base camp at El Palo Alto, in modern-day Palo Alto, California. The Laguna Creek and Laguna Grande place names are shown on the 1856 plat maps/diseños of Rancho de las Pulgas and Rancho Cañada de Raymundo and Easton's 1868 map of San Mateo County.

Raimundo, a native of Baja California, was sent out by the padres of Mission Santa Clara to capture runaway Mission Indians in 1797. On August 4, 1840, he was granted the Rancho Cañada de Raymundo and on the 1856 Rancho Pulgas and 1868 Easton maps, the valley of Laguna Creek was referred to as the Cañada de Raymundo and Laguna Grande became alternatively known as Lake Raymundo. Laguna Creek was also alternatively known as Cañada Raimundo Creek.

The two Crystal Springs lakes and San Andreas Lake used to be known as Spring Valley Lakes for the Spring Valley Water Company which owned them. The Spring Valley Water Company named the lakes, the Spring Valley Lakes, after the company. The original Spring Valley was between Mason and Taylor Streets, and Washington and Broadway Streets in San Francisco, where the water company started. When the company went south for more water, the Spring Valley name was carried south too. Laguna Grande was submerged when the Spring Valley Water Company built an earthen dam in 1877 (this was the first Crystal Springs Dam), forming Upper Crystal Springs Reservoir. The old earthen dam became a causeway between Upper and Lower Crystal Springs Reservoirs when the latter was formed by Herman Schussler's concrete Crystal Springs Dam, which dammed up San Mateo Creek to form the lower reservoir in 1888. The causeway is now crossed by Highway 92.

Filoli, the estate of Spring Valley Water Company tycoon William Bourn, is now an historic site. The staff there currently refers to Laguna Creek as "Orchard Creek", and its tributaries on the historic estate as Fault Creek and Spring Creek.

== Watershed ==
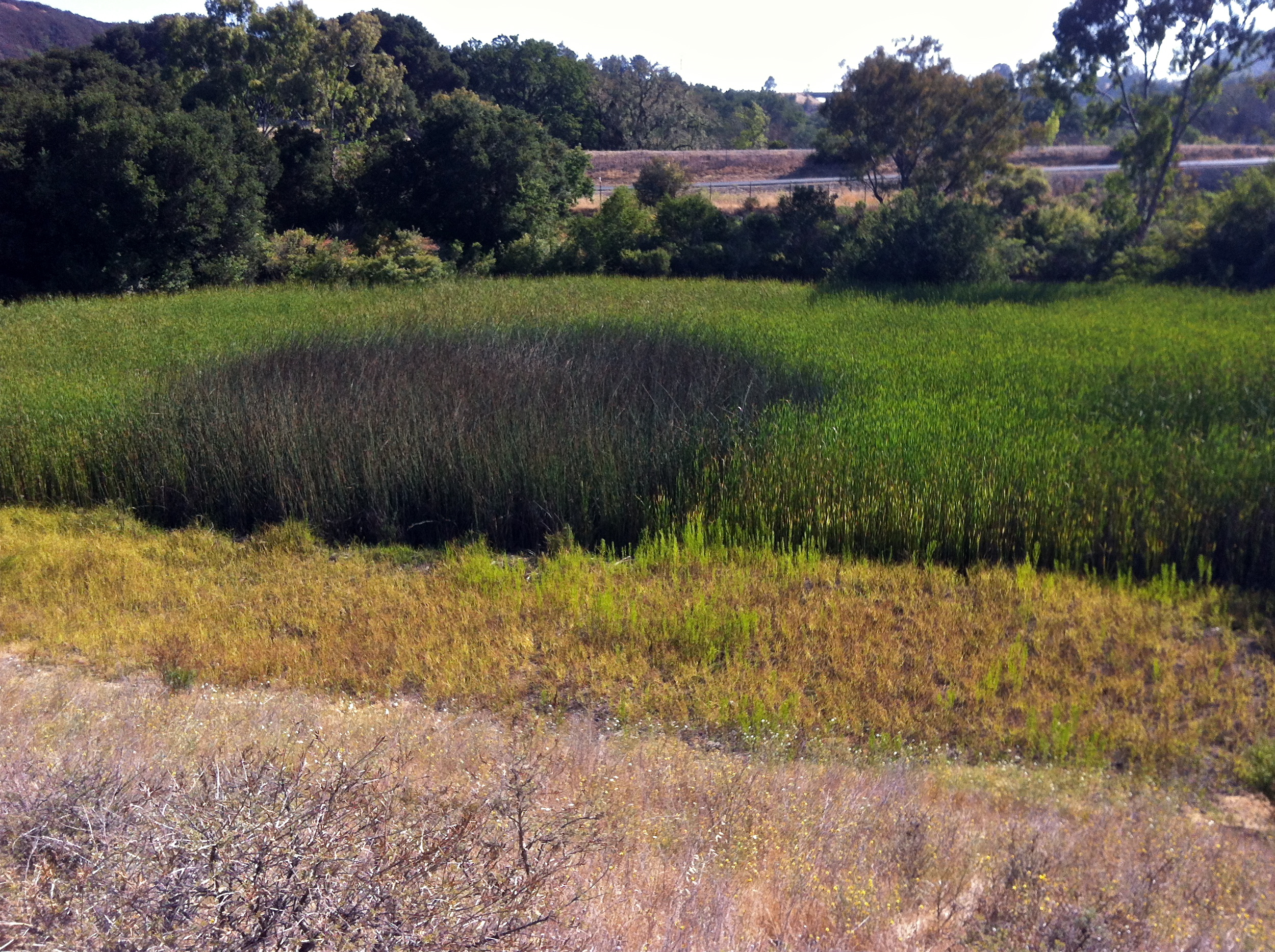
Just above and below Canada Road, at Edgewood Road, two small reservoirs were built on Laguna Creek, apparently to store water for fighting wildfires. View is north by northeast, with Cañada Road in background.

The official source of the Laguna Creek mainstem is in Edgewood County Park on the Serpentine Trail, along which it gently descends westerly until being forced into a culvert near the Interstate-280 underpass for the Edgewood Trail. It emerges on the west side of I-280 and continues west until it crosses Edgewood Road just north of Cañada Road. It is confined in a small reservoir northeast of Cañada Road, then passes beneath into another small reservoir west of Cañada Road, after which it joins the south fork of Laguna Creek. The south fork of Laguna Creek originates near the Sunset (Sunset Way) Trailhead, and descends in a small canyon along the Clarkia Trail until it reaches an earthen berm protecting the PG&E substation. After two right angle turns around the substation it passes into a culvert under I-280, emerging southwest of the I-280 overpass over Cañada Road. From here the south fork flows northwest along the west side of Cañada Road, passing Homestead Pond, then after crossing Phleger and Old Cañada Roads, it is joined by West Fork Laguna Creek (a short creek that flows down along Old Cañada Road). After that the south fork joins the Laguna Creek mainstem northwest of the intersection of Edgewood Road and Cañada Road. From here Laguna Creek is joined on the left (heading downstream) on the Filoli property by locally named Fault Creek, then Spring Creek, then on the right by the Hetch Hetchy Aqueduct and Pulgas Water Temple just before entering Upper Crystal Springs Reservoir.

Laguna Creek used to be 1.8 miles (2.9 km) longer, or 4.4 miles (7.1 km) long in total, before its confluence with San Mateo Creek was submerged by the Lower Crystal Springs Reservoir in 1888. Adobe Gulch is the northernmost of several tributaries (and the only one named by the USGS) that descend the eastern flank of the Santa Cruz Mountains to Upper Crystal Springs Reservoir (and historically, Laguna Creek).

== Ecology ==
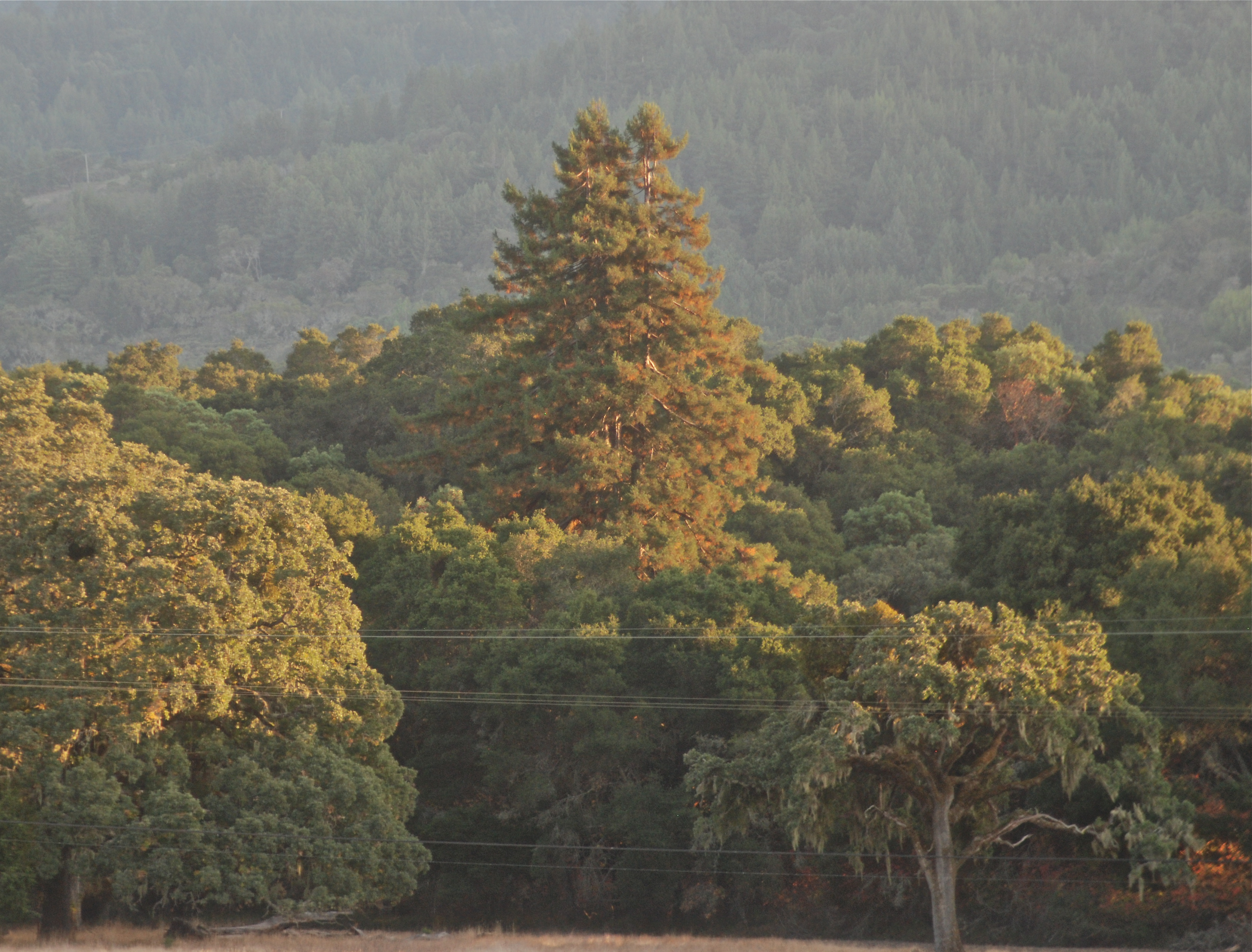
Coast redwoods (Sequoia sempervirens) on Laguna Creek tower over the oaks (just below Filoli's lower parking lot on main entrance road).

San Mateo County historian Frank Stanger cited sizeable groves of redwoods (Sequoia sempervirens) in the Laguna Creek watershed. In the area around Filoli he described two historic lumber mills. The historic "Smith Mill" on Fault Creek was destroyed by fire in 1854. Pinckney's mill in "the largest gulch", which would be Spring Creek, was built in 1855 and later purchased by S. L. Mastic. Although information on these mills is limited, they support the idea that "the area was thoroughly logged". A large redwood tree remains on Laguna Creek between the lower Filoli parking lot and main entrance gate.

Fog drip may play a key role in the precipitation in the upper watershed. On Cahill Ridge (just west of San Mateo Creek and east of Pilarcitos Creek, at an altitude of 1,000 feet, Oberlander measured fog drip beneath tanoak (Lithocarpus densiflorus), coast redwood and three Douglas fir trees, the latter 125 feet tall. He found that the trees most exposed produced the most precipitation and in five weeks of measurement (July 20 – August 28, 1951) fog drip below the tanoak produced 59 inches of precipitation, more than the total annual precipitation on nearby grasslands and chaparral. The Douglas fir produced 7–17 inches (180–430 mm) of fog drip and appeared to provide unique conditions supporting the orchids giant helleborine (Epipactis gigantea) and phantom orchid (Cephalanthera austiniae), since these plants were found exclusively in these moist ridge tops.

Both the Laguna Creek mainstem and south fork Laguna Creek originate northeast of I-280 in the Edgewood County Park and Nature Preserve, where the Friends of Edgewood Natural Preserve work to preserve the unique serpentine native grasslands, habitat which is critical to the threatened Bay checkerspot butterfly (Euphydryas editha bayensis).

Along the Crystal Springs Trail, just southwest of Cañada Road and its I-280 overpass, is the Homestead Pond. This 12 acre pond and marsh is host to Western pond turtles (Actinemys marmorata) and is adjacent to the south fork of Laguna Creek. The pond is the site of a restoration effort by the San Francisco Public Utilities Commission which will include removal of non-native eucalyptus trees and planting of native oaks and grasses.

Although Laguna Creek generally runs dry in summer, on October 17, 2012, two-year-old rainbow trout (Oncorhynchus mykiss) were observed in cold, spring-fed perennial pools along the Filoli property. This finding is notable considering that it was the very end of the dry season in a low rainfall year [63% of normal (182 mm of normal 492 mm in San Francisco)].

== See also ==
- List of watercourses in the San Francisco Bay Area
- Filoli
- San Mateo Creek
