= Isabella Worn =

American horticulturist and landscape designer

Isabella Worn (1869 – November 9, 1950) was an American horticulturist and garden designer best known for working on projects in northern and central California, including the gardens at the Filoli estate and Hearst Castle.

== Family ==
Isabella Austin Worn, known as Bella, was the third of five children of George Austin Worn, a horticulturist, and Annie (Ross) Worn. Her grandfather James Ross was a California immigrant who made a fortune in the Gold Rush years and used it to buy a large Mexican land grant, Rancho Punta de Quentin, where Isabella was born. The Marin County town of Ross, founded on this land grant, was named after James Ross. Between the landholdings, investments, and a lumber business, the family was affluent until much of the fortune was lost through speculation in Comstock Silver Mine shares.

== Career ==
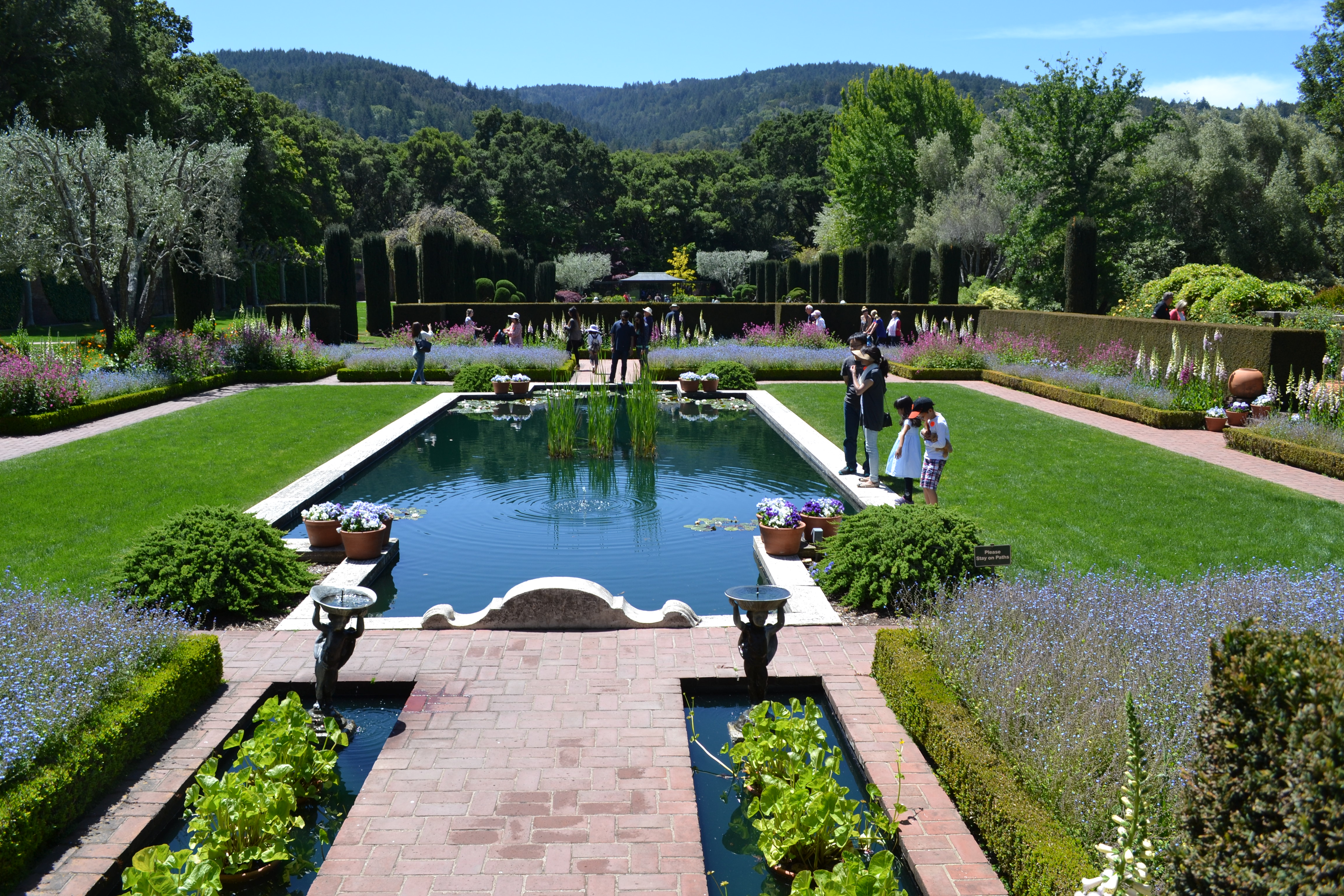
The Sunken Garden at Filoli

In 1888, Isabella and her sisters started a floral design business in downtown San Francisco, billing themselves as "The Misses Worn" and creating arrangements for banquets, balls, weddings, and other society events. They became known for a looser, less formal style of flower arrangements than what was then the standard. Isabella Worn remained active in this kind of design work throughout her career.

Although this was an era before women could get formal training in landscape design, Isabella Worn branched out into this area as well. One of her most important garden commissions came from William Bowers Bourn II, who in 1915 began developing a large estate called Filoli on the San Francisco peninsula (now open to the public). Worn was brought in to supervise the plantings in consultation with the primary landscape designer, Bruce Porter, who had established a series of formal gardens inspired by Italian Renaissance models. Worn not only advised on the initial plantings, she later designed the swimming pool area, a pavilion, and various other alterations under subsequent owners. She ultimately worked on Filoli on and off for 35 years.

In 1921, Worn began to work on the gardens at Hearst Castle, William Randolph Hearst’s estate on California's Central Coast. She was brought in by architect Julia Morgan to work on developing the garden plantings. Although valued for her excellent sense of color, she did not stay on this project long, resigning after falling out with Hearst.

Other plantings Worn designed included the Italianate garden at the Russell Crocker estate in Hillsborough, later to become the Hillsborough Country Club (1910); the Tobin Clark estate in San Mateo (1931); and an indoor-outdoor garden at the 1939-40 Golden Gate International Exposition on Treasure Island in San Francisco Bay. One of her last commissions — on which she collaborated with John William Gregg — was the plantings around Stern Hall, a new women's dormitory at the University of California, Berkeley (1941).

After her death, a memorial fund was established to name a grove of redwood trees in her honor at Prairie Creek Redwoods State Park in northern California.
