= Crystal Springs Reservoir =

Northern California Lakes atop the San Andreas Fault

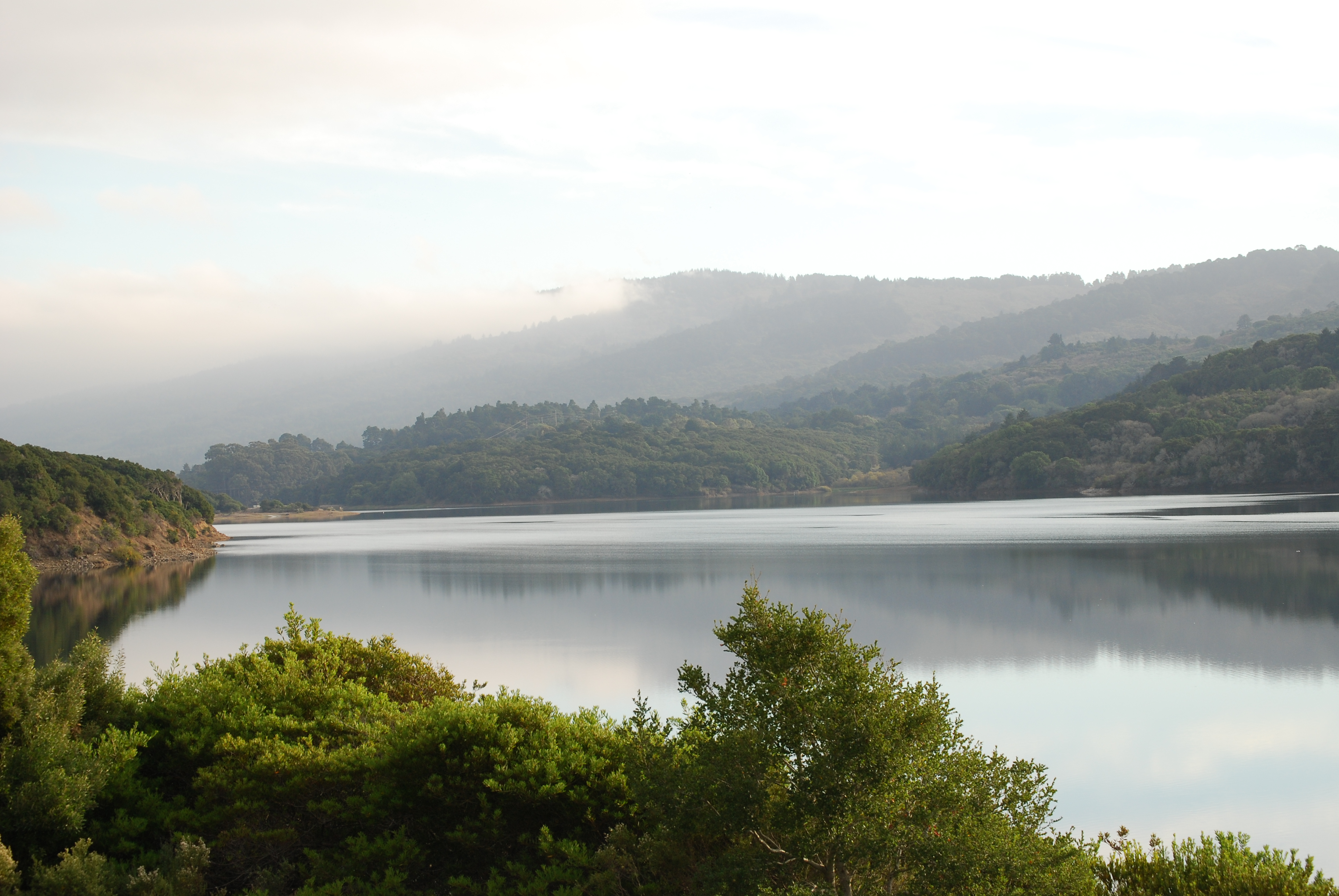
- Lower Crystal Springs Reservoir as viewed from the Sawyer Camp Trail

- Location within California Location within the United States
- Location: Santa Cruz Mountains; San Mateo County, California
- Coordinates: Lower reservoir 37.5280°N 122.3650°W; Upper reservoir 37.4993°N 122.3389°W
- Type: Reservoir
- Primary inflows: San Mateo Creek, San Andreas Creek, Adobe Gulch, Laguna Creek, Hetch Hetchy Aqueduct
- Primary outflows: San Mateo Creek
- Catchment area: 29.4 sq mi (76 km^{2})
- Basin countries: United States
- Managing agency: San Francisco Public Utilities Commission
- Surface area: 1,323 acres (535 ha)
- Water volume: 57,910 acre⋅ft (71,430,000 m^{3})
- Surface elevation: 85 m (279 ft)
- References: U.S. Geological Survey Geographic Names Information System: Crystal Springs Reservoir

Crystal Springs Reservoir is a pair of artificial lakes located in the northern Santa Cruz Mountains of San Mateo County, California operated by the San Francisco Public Utilities Commission for water supply to the San Francisco peninsula. The reservoirs are located in the rift valley created by the San Andreas Fault just to the west of the cities of San Mateo and Hillsborough, and I-280. The lakes are part of the San Mateo Creek watershed. Crystal Springs Regional Trail runs along the reservoir.

== History ==
The original name of the southern or Upper Crystal Springs Reservoir was Laguna Grande, a natural lake that disappeared with the creation of the reservoir, which has a California Historical Marker ("NO. 94 Ohlone-Portolá Heritage Trail, Laguna Grande). The Portolà Expedition of 1769 camped here on November 5th. From the journal of Fray Juan Crespí, "We stopped close to a lake where there are countless ducks, geese, and so forth, in the same hollow at a half past one in the afternoon; and we have made three leagues in four hours and a half. Here in this hollow tracks have been encountered of large livestock, which some said were made by bears; others, by buffalo (elk). Also a great many deer have been seen together, while the scouts aver that when they explore here, they saw whole bands of deer, and counted so many as fifty deer together in one. As we were upon the point of setting out from the spot, three very well-behaved heathens came over from the villages here, seeking us out laden with a good share of black pies and a sort of cherries that they made a present of, and they followed us along well pleased, giving us to understand we should go to their village [and] they will give us food. (A great many madroños, small and large, have been met with during these two days' march, laden with fruits the size of so many beads off our rosaries.)" The Expedition found the native people to be most gracious, offering food and guidance. The Lamchins were a large group, probably about 350 people. Their lands in the south-central part of the Peninsula included the present cities of Redwood City and Woodside, as well as the Phleger Estate portion of the Golden Gate National Recreation Area. Their known villages, Cachanigtac, Guloisnistac, Oromstac, and Supichom, cannot be precisely located.

Today Laguna Grande is covered by the Upper Crystal Springs Lake located 2 mi (3.2 km) south of Crystal Springs Dam on Cañada Road. The Laguna Grande place name is also shown on the 1840s diseño del Rancho Cañada de Raymundo and an 1856 plat of the Rancho de las Pulgas.

The two Crystal Springs lakes and San Andreas Lake used to be known as Spring Valley Lakes for the Spring Valley Water Company which owned them. The Spring Valley Water Company named the lakes, the Spring Valley Lakes, after the company. The original Spring Valley was between Mason and Taylor Streets, and Washington and Broadway Streets in San Francisco, where the water company started. When the company went south for more water, the Spring Valley name was carried south too.

=== Crystal Springs village ===
Lower Crystal Springs Reservoir now covers the town of Crystal Springs which grew up around a little resort town of the same name, founded in the mid-19th century and located just northwest of the present-day dam. The Crystal Springs Hotel tract was constructed around the 1860s on leased land, located 4 mi (6.4 km) from the San Mateo train depot and along a stagecoach stop, and around this hotel a small town developed including a dairy and farms. The land leased for the hotel was owned by Spring Valley Water Company. In 1875, the town of Crystal Springs lost its population and business and by 1887, the location of the town was underwater because of the dam construction. There is speculation if any of the town structures were left prior to the dam completion, however according to a 1922 publication by the Spring Valley Water Company, "In the end, the entire 35 sq mi (91 km^{2}) of catchment area were swept clean of all human habitation."

== Description ==
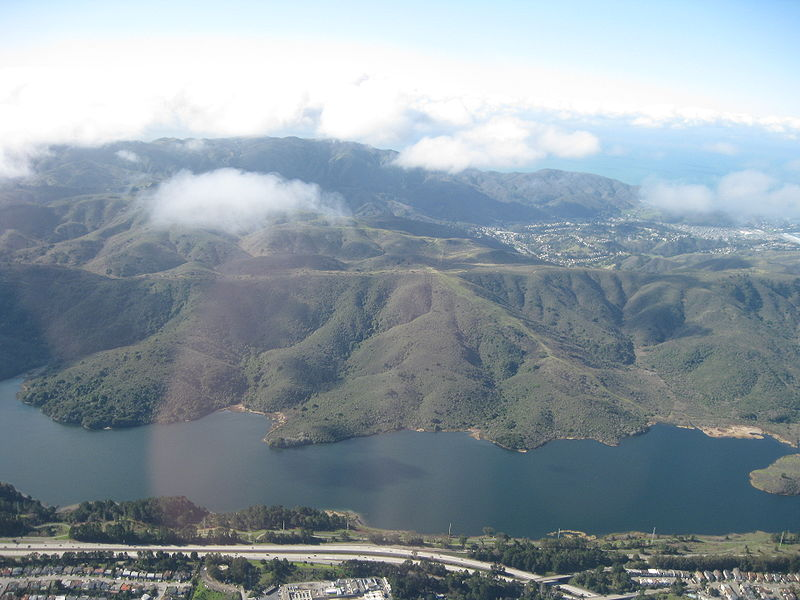
Lower reservoir looking west to Montara Mountain and Pacifica

The entire reservoir consists of two different reservoir lakes.

The southern lake, Upper Crystal Springs Reservoir, was created when the Spring Valley Water Company built an earthen dam (this was the first Crystal Springs Dam) on Laguna Creek (or Lake Creek), in 1877. The old earthen dam became a causeway between Upper and Lower Crystal Springs Reservoirs when the latter was formed by Herman Schussler's 150 ft (46 m) tall concrete Crystal Springs Dam, which dammed up San Mateo Creek to form the lower (northern) reservoir in 1888. The causeway is now crossed by Highway 92. Laguna Creek flows north through the Filoli estate and has tributaries that descend from the western slope of Edgewood County Park and the eastern slope of the Santa Cruz Mountains. In addition to Laguna Creek, Upper Crystal Springs Reservoir is fed by Adobe Gulch which descends from Cahill Ridge south of and parallel to Highway 92 into a wetland marsh then joins the reservoir at Adobe Point.

The northern reservoir, Lower Crystal Springs Reservoir, is fed by San Mateo Creek and San Andreas Creek at its north end. It also receives water from Upper Crystal Springs Reservoir via tunnels beneath Highway 92. Below Crystal Springs Dam, lower San Mateo Creek receives limited flows from Lower Crystal Springs Reservoir and descends to the Bay.

In 1924, culverts were built through Upper Crystal Springs Dam to hydraulically link Upper and Lower Crystal Springs Reservoirs.

Part of the water in the reservoirs comes from local precipitation and the rest is piped in from the Hetch Hetchy Reservoir in Yosemite National Park, as well as the Pilarcitos Creek watershed and Alameda Creek watershed. The entire reservoir was built and owned by a private company, the Spring Valley Water Company, and was eventually deeded under the ownership and protection of the city of San Francisco and the San Francisco Public Utilities Commission (SFPUC). Most of the reservoir is still kept closed by SFPUC to protect both water quality and the natural environment. This local protection has ensured the survival of important species in the area, and a set of trails in Crystal Springs Park allows visitors to view the reservoir and the local wildlife.

Protected animals include the giant rainbow trout and bass which live in the reservoir.

== Flora and fauna ==
A considerable biodiversity of flora and fauna exist in the vicinity of the reservoir, which is located within the California Floristic Province. Among these species are a number of rare and endangered species including Acanthomintha duttonii or San Mateo thornmint, Hesperolinon congestum (Marin Dwarf Flax) and Eriophyllum latilobum or San Mateo Woolly Sunflower.

A pair of bald eagles (Haliaeetus leucocephalus) built a nest in a coast Douglas fir (Pseudotsuga menziesii var. menziesii) in March 2012. This was the first reported bald eagle nest in San Mateo County since 1915. Although initially unsuccessful, they have returned to their nest in the northwest corner of the lower reservoir. In 2013, they successfully mated and the fledgling flew north after leaving the nest.

== See also ==
- Hetch Hetchy Aqueduct
- List of dams and reservoirs in California
- List of lakes in California
- List of lakes in the San Francisco Bay Area
- Filoli - a historic estate on the reservoir
- Crystal Springs Dam
