= Adobe Gulch =

Valley in California, United States

- Location within California
- Length: 1.2 miles (1.9 km)

Geography
- Coordinates: 37°29′53″N 122°20′51″W
- Interactive map of Adobe Gulch

Adobe Gulch is a valley in San Mateo County, California, United States, about 1.2 miles (1.9 km) long, located on the west side of Upper Crystal Springs Reservoir. It has an elevation of 97 meters, or 318 feet. It is located at 37-29'53 N and 122-20'51 W. Adobe Gulch is the northernmost of several tributaries (and the only one named by the USGS) that descend the eastern flank of the Santa Cruz Mountains to Upper Crystal Springs Reservoir (and historically, Laguna Creek).
