= Timeline of the Portolá expedition =

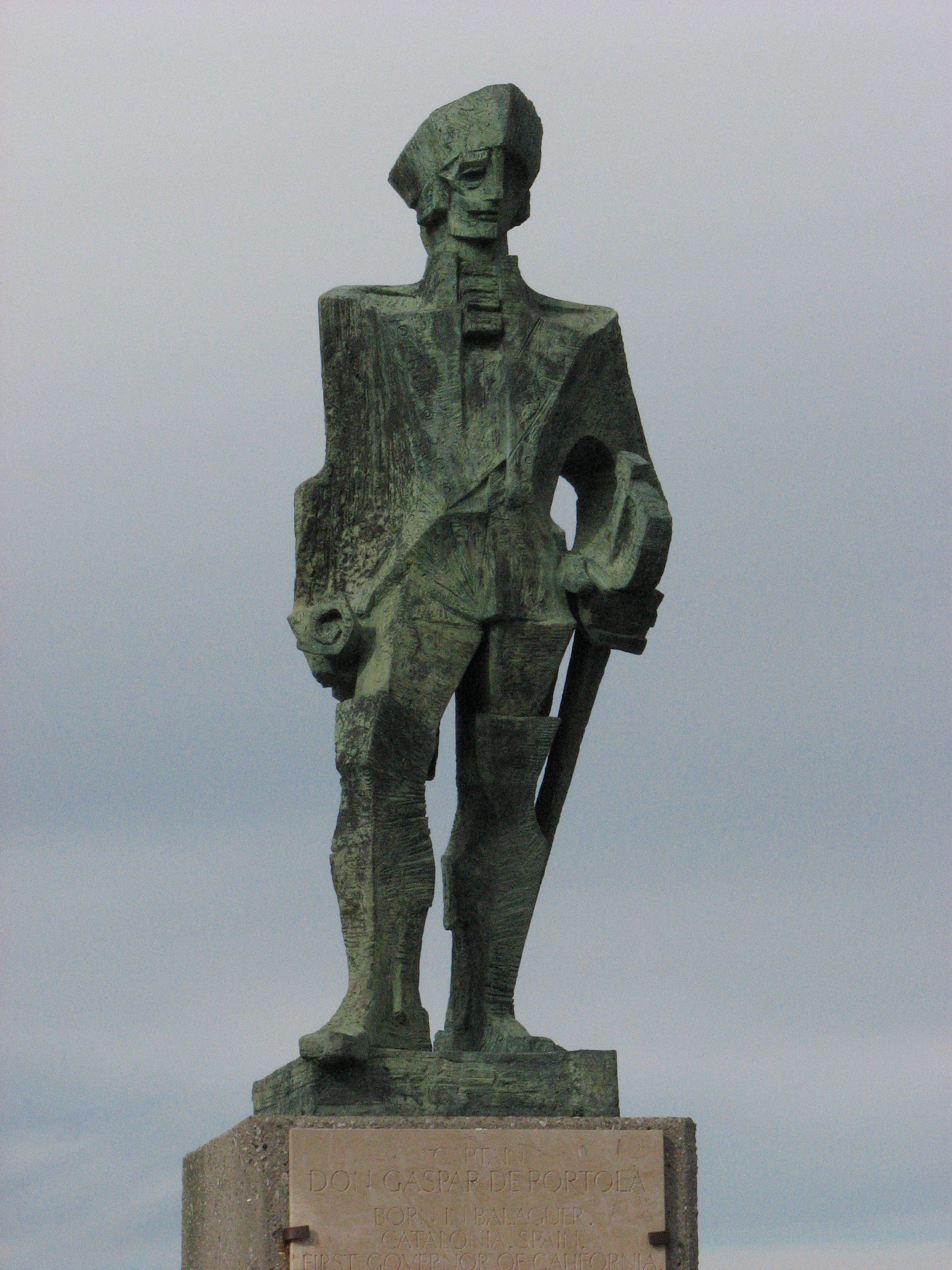
Statue of Gaspar de Portolá in Pacifica, California, near the expedition's November 1 camp

This timeline of the Portolá expedition tracks the progress during 1769 and 1770 of the first European exploration-by-land of north-western coastal areas in what became Las Californias, a province of Spanish colonial New Spain. Later, the region was administratively-split into Baja (lower, see Baja California peninsula) and Alta (upper, see Alta California). The first section of the march was on the Baja California peninsula, and the northern section of the expedition's trail was in today's US state of California.

Missionary Juan Crespi kept a diary describing the group's daily progress and detailed descriptions of their locations, allowing modern researchers to reconstruct their journey. Portions of other diaries by Gaspar de Portolá, engineer Miguel Costansó, missionary Junípero Serra, army officer Jose de Canizares, and Sergeant José Ortega also survived. When analyzed as a whole, they provide detailed daily information on the route traveled and camping locations, as well as descriptions of the country and its native inhabitants.

== Background ==
The Portolá expedition was the brainchild of José de Gálvez, visitador (inspector general, a personal representative of the king) in New Spain. On his recommendation, King Charles III of Spain authorized Gálvez to explore Alta California and establish the first permanent Spanish presence there. Gálvez was supported in the planning of an expedition by Carlos Francisco de Croix (Viceroy of New Spain), and Father Junípero Serra (head of the Franciscan mission to the Californias).

Gálvez and Serra met in November, 1768, to plan the expedition. The goals set were to establish two Presidios and nearby missions – at San Diego and Monterrey (one "r" has since been dropped). These places had been described and given names 166 years before by the maritime explorations of Sebastián Vizcaíno. In addition, the name San Carlos Borromeo was chosen for the mission at Monterrey.

Gálvez placed Gaspar de Portolá, recently appointed governor of Las Californias, in overall command of the expedition. Second in command was Captain Fernando Rivera y Moncada, commander of the Presidio at Loreto. Serra headed the Franciscan missionary contingent. Three ships were also assigned: two to follow the land march up the coast and keep the expedition supplied from the naval depot at La Paz (on the Baja peninsula), and another ship to connect La Paz with the mainland at San Blas.

Elements of the land expedition gathered north of Loreto in March, 1769, and marched north-west to San Diego; then from San Diego to the San Francisco Peninsula and back. Rivera led the first group, consisting mainly of soldiers, scouts and engineers to prepare the road and deal with hostile natives. Portolá and Serra followed in a second group with the civilians, livestock and baggage. Serra stayed with the new mission in San Diego while Portolá and Rivera took a smaller group north.

Led by Rivera's scouts, the road followed established native paths as much as possible (the southern and central California coastal areas were found to have the densest native population of any region north of central Mexico), and blazing new trails where necessary. The two main requirements for a camping place were an adequate supply of drinkable fresh water and forage for the livestock. For that reason, most of the campsites were near creeks, ponds or springs. All three of the main land expedition diaries give daily distances traveled in leagues. As used at that time, one Spanish league equaled about 2.6 miles. A typical day's march covered 2–4 leagues, with frequent rest days.

The following year (1770), Portolá returned north as far as Monterrey to establish the second Presidio there and to establish a new provincial seat. Serra came north by sea to make the Mission San Carlos Borromeo del rio Carmelo (moved a few miles south from its original Monterrey location) his headquarters. Portolá's successor as governor, Pedro Fages, found an easier inland route later in 1770 from Monterrey to San Francisco Bay, and further explored the eastern side of the bay in 1772 (accompanied again by padre Juan Crespí, who again kept a diary).

The 1776 expedition of Juan Bautista de Anza used the official Portolá expedition report (drawn from the diaries) to follow mostly in the footsteps of Portolá from Mission San Gabriel to Monterrey, taking the Fages route from Monterrey to San Francisco Bay. Much of today's Juan Bautista de Anza National Historic Trail in coastal California was previously the Portolá trail. Sixteen of the twenty-one Spanish Missions of California were established along the Portolá route.

== About the diaries ==
The Crespí diary is the most complete of the three land expedition accounts, because Crespí was the only diarist present during the entire expedition. It includes nearly all of the information found in the other two, plus many extra details about the country and the native peoples. Herbert Bolton translated Crespi's diary to English and annotated it with modern references. Bolton added information about the modern campsite locations, as shown below. Bolton also included maps with his "best guess" of the expedition's march routes, superimposed on modern California maps.

In 2001, a new edition of the Crespí diary was published, with side-by-side Spanish and English text – both of Crespí's original field notes, and also his expanded rewrite for the later official version.

Vicente Vila, captain of the San Carlos — one of three ships supporting the expedition — also kept a diary that has survived, but he only sailed as far as San Diego, and never joined the expedition on land. Free online translations of both Vila's and Costansó's diaries are available. Fages also wrote, in 1775, an after-the fact account of the 1769–70 expedition.

The official report of the expedition is also available online. Written later by Carlos Francisco de Croix, marqués de Croix, the brief document drew on the diaries kept by the expedition participants.

== January to June in Baja California ==
January–June 1769
- Jan 9 – From La Paz on the east side of the Baja peninsula, the San Carlos and San Antonio departed, heading south. Passengers included Lieutenant Pedro Fages with his 25 soldiers and Miguel Costanzó.
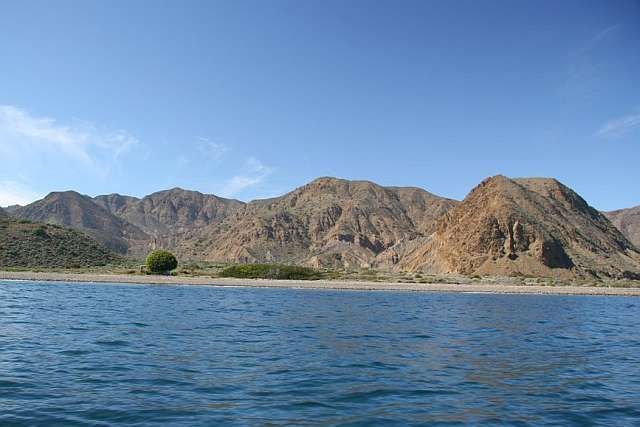
  Cedros Island, off the west coast of Baja California
  Governor Portolá and the others in the land arm of the expedition departed from Loreto, Baja California (capital of Las Californias), about the same time the ships left La Paz (Loreto is about 150 miles north of La Paz). The rough-to-non-existent trail was over 400 miles from Loreto north to Velicatá, and land travel can't have been much faster than the 5–10 miles/day the diarists noted later on. The plan was for marchers and ships to reach San Diego at the same time but, as we'll see, the ships made much better time.
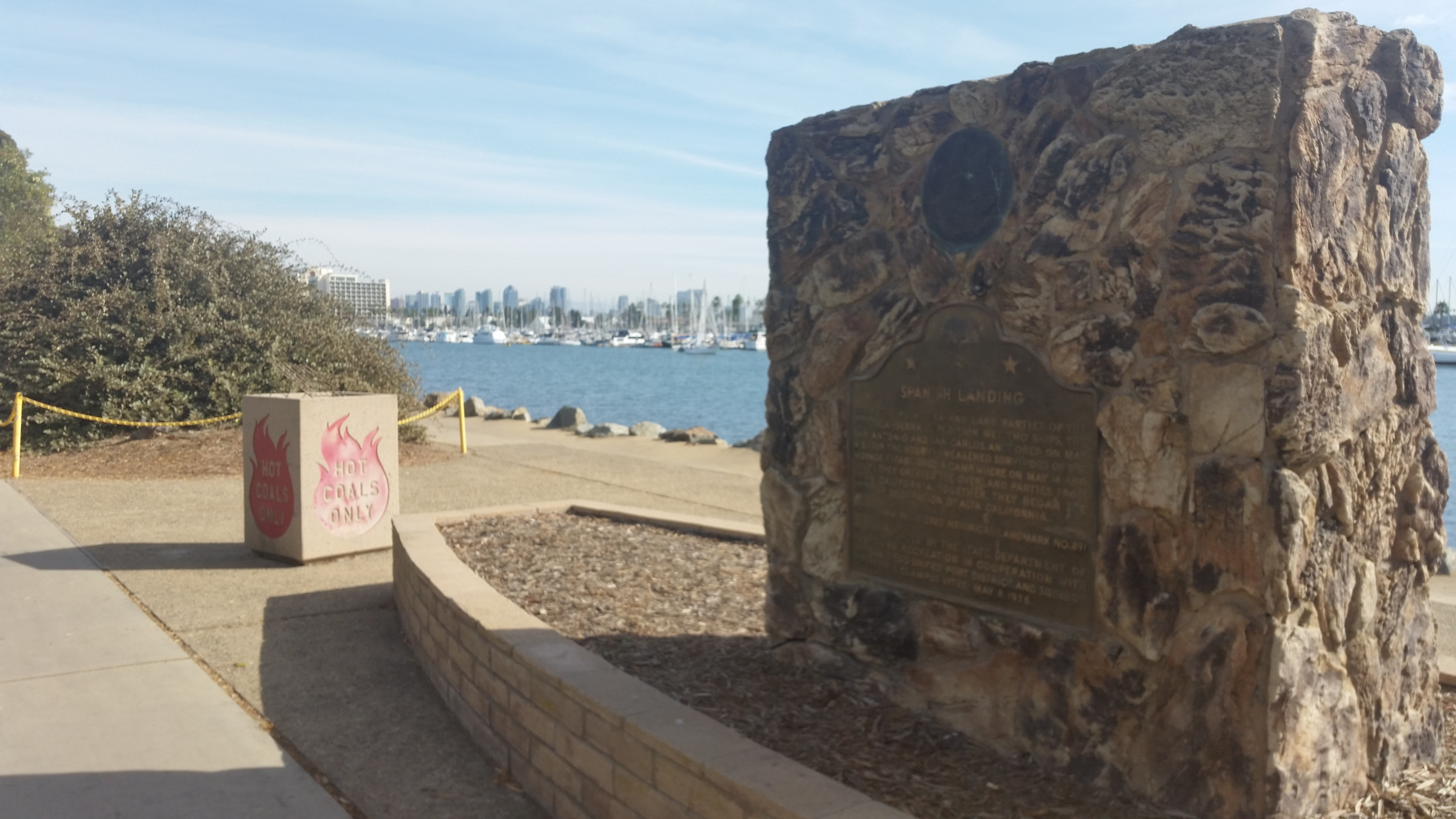
  Portolá-Serra expedition approximate meeting point
- Jan 16 – The San Carlos rounds Cabo San Lucas and turns north.
- Feb 14 – The San Carlos sights the island of Guadalupe, about 160 miles off the west coast of Baja California.
- Mar 6 – Needing water and firewood, the San Carlos had turned east-southeast toward the mainland and on this day sighted Cedros Island. The island was named by maritime explorer Sebastián Vizcaíno in 1602 and bears the same name today.
- Mar 8–20 – The San Carlos anchored off the east side of Cedros Island. Lieutenant Pedro Fages led the shore party that made many trips in the ship's launch to fill casks with water and gather firewood. Fully re-supplied, San Carlos put out to sea again on the 20th. Lack of wind made progress slow, however, and it wasn't until April 3 that the lookouts again sighted Guadalupe Island.
- Mar 22 – Crespí arrived at Velicatá from Loreto. His daily diary began at departure two days later.
- Mar 24 – From Velicatá, the first land group departed, led by Captain Rivera and including Franciscan priest and diarist Juan Crespí. The second group, led by Gaspar de Portolá and including the leader of the Franciscan missionaries, Junípero Serra, soon followed. After leaving Velicatá, about 220 miles (in a straight line) south of San Diego, there were no more Spanish outposts.
- Apr 11 – The San Antonio arrived in San Diego. The men are ill and set up a camp near the beach.
- Apr 29 – The San Carlos arrived in San Diego, after at first sailing too far north.
- May 2 – The Rivera group reached the Bahía de Todos Santos, on the Pacific (west) coast of the Baja peninsula. The bay had previously been charted and named by earlier Spanish maritime explorers, and the explorers were looking for it. From this point on to San Diego, the expedition stayed close to the west coast.
- May 14 – The Rivera group arrived in San Diego. Combined with the few healthy men from the San Carlos and the San Antonio, they built a new camp in the area that became the Presidio of San Diego.
- Jun 28 – Sergeant José Francisco Ortega, traveling ahead of the Portolá/Serra group with one soldier, arrived at San Diego. A party was sent back with him to assist the main group.

== Month by month in Alta California ==
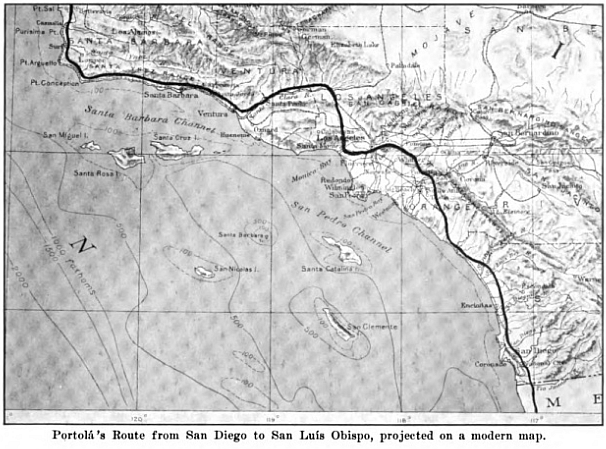

July 1769
- 1 – The Portolá/Serra group arrived in San Diego. Junípero Serra consecrated Mission San Diego de Alcalá on July 16.
- 9 – The San Carlos departed for return to San Blas, crewed by the remaining healthy sailors from both ships. Captain Vila's diary continued for the return voyage.
- 14 – Portolá departed from San Diego with a single group of 74, aiming to reach Monterey. The group included Rivera, Fages, Ortega and Costansó. Among the missionaries, Crespí and Gómez went with Portolá, while Serra stayed in San Diego with Vizcaíno and Parrón. Serra intended to wait for the San Jose and travel by sea to Monterey, but the ship never arrived and was presumed either lost at sea or returned to port. The expedition camped just north of Mission Bay.
- 15 – To today's San Dieguito Creek, near Del Mar
- 16 – To today's San Marcos Creek above Batiquitos Lagoon, near La Costa resort south of Carlsbad
- 17 – To today's Buena Vista Creek, on the north side of Carlsbad
- 18–19 – To San Luis Rey River, where Mission San Luis Rey was later established, near today's Oceanside. The main party stays an extra day while Sergeant Ortega explores ahead with the scouts. The ruggedness of the coastal mountains beyond this point necessitated a more inland route.
- 20 – A short march north up the river valley and then a bit west to the Santa Margarita River, which was given its name by Crespí. The "pool of water" the explorers found is now Lake O'Neill, a recreational area inside Camp Pendleton, about 8 miles in from the coast.
- 21 – To Las Pulgas Creek, still within Camp Pendleton.
- 22 – To Christianitos Canyon, which reaches the Pacific at the southern edge of today's city of San Clemente
- 23 – North up Christianitos Canyon, over the hills and down to San Juan Creek (named later for the mission). They followed the creek west to the future location of Mission San Juan Capistrano. The state highway that now follows San Juan Creek in this area is named Ortega Highway after the leader of Portolá's scouts. On this day, the travelers crossed from today's San Diego County into Orange County.
- 24 – To Aliso Creek. The neighborhood where the creek exits the hills is now called Portola Hills.
- 25 – A rest day at Aliso Creek.
- 26 – Short march northwest along the edge of the foothills, to a spring at the northern edge of today's Irvine, California. From a hill above, the party first sees the broad coastal plain of northwestern Orange County.
- 27 – To Santiago Creek, so named by Crespí.
- 28 – To the Santa Ana River, one of the major rivers of southern California. The soldiers of the expedition gave the river the name Santa Ana. A strong earthquake is felt that afternoon; aftershocks are recorded over the next few days.
- 29 – North-northwest to the hills north of modern Fullerton, or possibly a little further north into La Habra.
- 30 – Leaving Orange County and entering Los Angeles County, the expedition heads north over the pass (la habra) through the Puente Hills. Today's North Harbor Boulevard follows the Portolá route over the pass. The march continued northwest to the San Gabriel River, where the party built "a bridge of poles" to cross the miry riverbed. This bridge (La Puente in Crespi's diary) is remembered in the name of today's nearby city of La Puente.
- 31 – West-northwest to the western end of San Gabriel Valley, near the modern city of Alhambra.
August 1769
- See Fray Juan Crespí diary (Bolton), pp. 146–179
- 1 – A rest day.
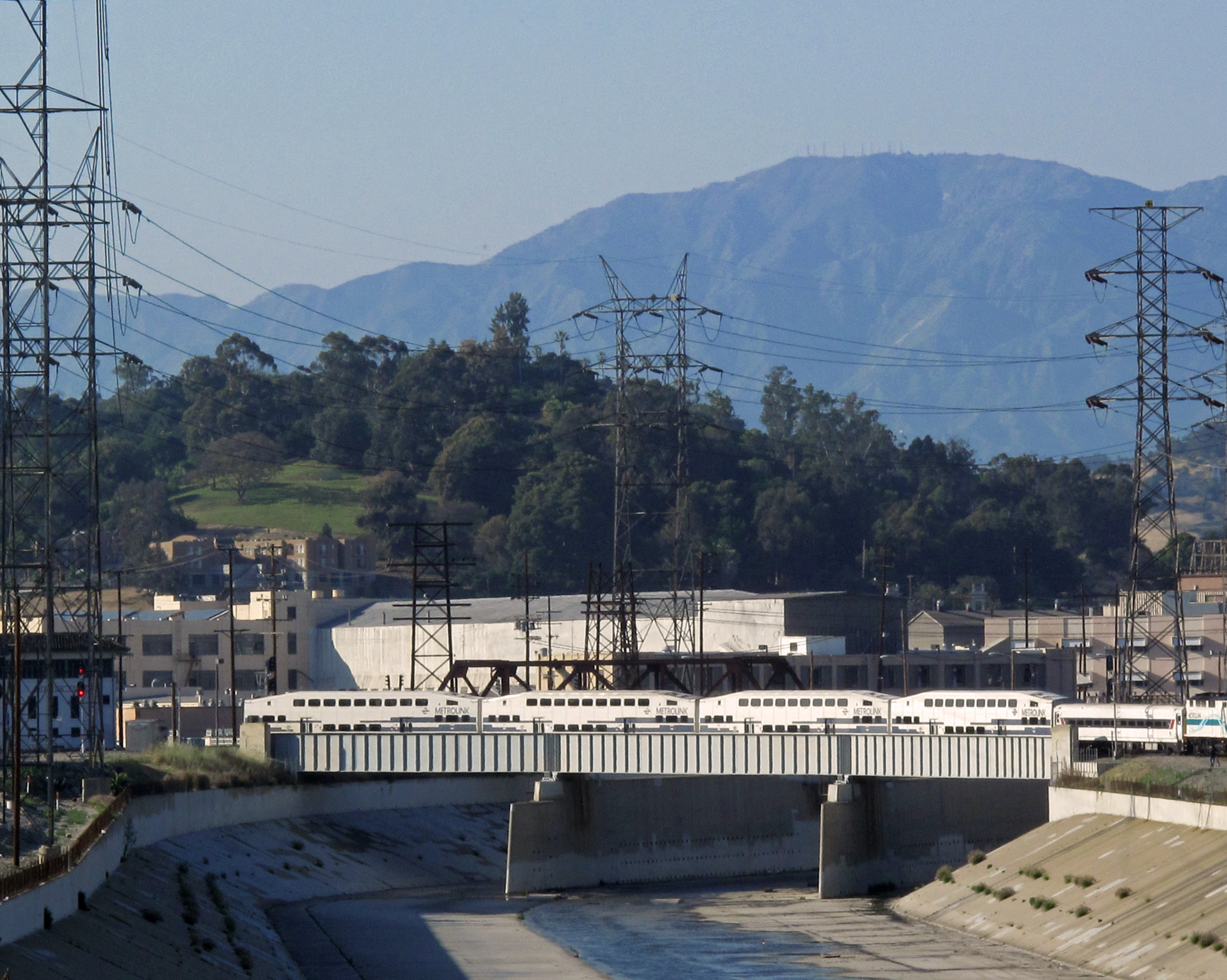
  Los Angeles River today, looking north in the area where Portolá crossed. The green hill in the mid-distance is Elysian Park, where California Historical Landmark#655 ("Portolá Trail Campsite") has been placed while the actual campsite is located on the other side of the river.
- 2 – West out of San Gabriel Valley, through the hills to the river Crespí named El Río de Nuestra Señora La Reina de Los Ángeles de Porciúncula. Crespí also noted the dry riverbed (Arroyo Seco) entering just above the spot where they crossed.
- 3 – Fording the river, the expedition continued west along the line of today's Wilshire Boulevard, passing the La Brea Tar Pits and camping near the headwaters of Ballona Creek (now drained).
- 4 – West to a camp not far from the coast at today's Pacific Palisades. Bolton's footnote speculates that the location was "northwest of Soldiers' Home". There's a historical marker about half a mile south of the Home, at a location claimed to be the campsite.
- 5 – The scouts determined that the coastal cliffs made passage impossible, so the expedition turned around and headed back inland. Following today's Sepulveda Boulevard through the pass to the northwest, the travelers came out into the San Fernando Valley above today's Encino, a neighborhood of Los Angeles. Crespí noted the many oaks (encinos) that gave the place its name. The Los Encinos State Historic Park is a likely campground location.
- 6 – The expedition found a large village of friendly natives in this place, and stayed for a rest day.
- 7 – North across the San Fernando Valley to camp near where Mission San Fernando Rey de España would be established in 1797.
- 8 – Northwest out of San Fernando Valley, up the steep pass now used by Interstate Highway 5, to a camp on the Santa Clara River (so named by Crespí) near today's Six Flags Magic Mountain amusement park.
- 9 – Another rest day near another native village.
- 10 – Following the Santa Clara River west-southwest back down toward the coast, the next camp was near today's Rancho Camulos. On this day, the expedition crossed today's county line from Los Angeles County to Ventura County, California.
- 11 – Continuing along the river to the vicinity of today's Fillmore. (Note: Bolton's footnotes on Crespí's entries for August 11–13 are misplaced by one day. In the online edition, there is no footnote for the August 11 entry, while the August 12 footnote identifies the campsite as near Fillmore. Yet Crespí's distance notes make it clear that the Fillmore camp was August 11.)
- 12 – Another march along the river of about three leagues, to the vicinity of present-day Santa Paula.
- 13 – Three leagues farther, to today's Saticoy (Bolton's footnote says Santa Paula) where the valley opens up into the vast Oxnard Plain to the south.
- 14 – The expedition reaches the coast once again, turning northwest and camping near the mouth of the Ventura River, just past a large native village, later the location of Mission San Buenaventura and modern Ventura.
- 15 – Northwest along the coast to Pitas Point, now a popular surfing spot called "Whistles". The name came from Crespí's story of the pipes or whistles (los pitos) played by the local natives.
- 16 – Northwest again to Rincon, another surf spot, in today's Santa Barbara County, California.
- 17 – A shorter march northwest to Carpinteria. The soldiers gave the place the name (meaning "carpenter shop") after watching the natives build a fishing boat.
- 18 – To present-day Santa Barbara. The channel between the mainland and the string of offshore islands had been named Santa Bárbara by Sebastián Vizcaíno in 1602. Camp was at a spring-fed lake (laguna) that no longer exists. Its existence is remembered only in the naming of Laguna Street. Nearby is Ortega Street, named for Sgt. Ortega who later became first comandante of the Presidio of Santa Barbara.
- 19 – A short move ("no more than half a league" – Crespí) to Mission Creek, about a mile from the later site of Mission Santa Barbara.
- 20 – West to a large estuary with five prosperous native villages around it. Today the estuary is mostly drained and filled, and is the site of the Santa Barbara Municipal Airport and the city of Goleta.
- 21 – West to a pair of large native settlements occupying the two sides of a steep arroyo, near the beach. The place later became known as Dos Pueblos.
- 22 – Rest day at Dos Pueblos.
- 23 – West along the coast to one of the small creeks flowing south to the coast out of the Santa Ynez Mountains. This area was later part of Rancho Nuestra Señora del Refugio, granted to former sergeant Ortega.
- 24 – West to a place the soldiers named La Gaviota, because they killed a seagull there. Still called Gaviota.
- 25 – Continuing west along the coast, a route followed today by Hollister Ranch Road.
- 26 – West to Cojo Creek, just before Point Conception. The soldiers named the native village at this place Rancheria del Cojo (Village of the lame man) because the chief was lame in one leg. It was also near this place that the expedition, consulting their guidebooks, identified Point Conception.
- 27 – Northwest to today's Jalama Creek. The expedition's names, Cojo and Espada, were later given to Mexican ranchos in this area.
- 28 – Northwest to another creek near Point Arguello. This area is now within Vandenberg Air Force Base.
- 29 – North past Point Arguello, still in Vandenberg.
- 30 – North to the mouth of the Santa Ynez River, west of today's city of Lompoc where Mission La Purisima was later founded.
- 31 – North to San Antonio Creek, just north of the Vandenberg airfield.
September 1769
- See Fray Juan Crespí diary (Bolton), pages 180–202
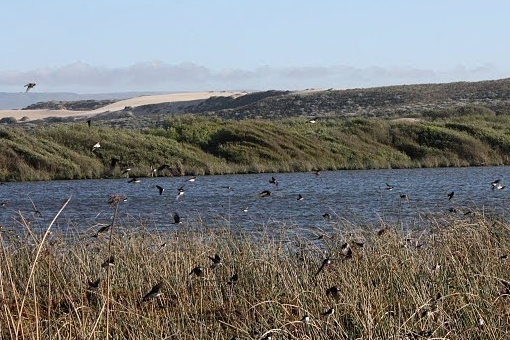
  Oso Flaco Lake today, with sand dunes beyond
- 1 – North, staying inland of the extensive sand dunes along the coast, to today's town of Guadalupe. When the expedition saw the area, it was covered by a large lake.
- 2 – North, entering today's San Luis Obispo County, California, to a small lake. Some of the soldiers called the place Oso Flaco because they killed a "skinny bear" nearby. The place is relatively unchanged, unlike most of the Portolá route, and is still called Oso Flaco Lake. It's a state park within the Guadalupe-Nipomo Dunes.
- 3 – A rest day at Oso Flaco, while the scouts go ahead to find the best way through the mountains that are again pinching off the coastal plain.
- 4 – To avoid the sand dunes that extend well inland to the north of Oso Flaco, the party first went west to the beach, then north until they passed today's Arroyo Grande Creek. Turning inland to go around a large estuary (today a much smaller Pismo Lake between the towns of Pismo Beach and Grover Beach), the expedition moves through today's town of Arroyo Grande. Rounding the estuary, they turned northeast and headed into the mountains, up the arroyo now called Price Canyon, camping along the creek.
- 5 – West-northwest through the hills to San Luis Canyon, where camp was made along the creek. This is the canyon where today's Highway 101, after leaving the coast, descends from the pass into the present-day San Luis Obispo area, coming within a few miles of the later site of Mission San Luis Obispo.
- 6 – Another rest day, while the scouts once again look ahead.
- 7 – To a valley west of San Luis Obispo that the soldiers named Los Osos because they saw many bears. The valley, creek and town still have the name Los Osos today.
- 8 – West to a hill just east of today's Morro Bay. Crespí noted the large free-standing coastal rock formation, a shape the Spaniards of that time called a morro. Bay, town, creek and rock have all kept the name.
- 9 – Northwest around Morro Bay to one of the small creeks near modern Cayucos.
- 10 – The expedition left the coast again, following the creek north from where they had camped, then over hills and down to west-flowing Santa Rosa Creek, above modern Cambria.
- 11 – Starting out following the creek west back to the coast, they follow the coastal plain (and modern California State Route 1) northwest to Little Pico Creek near modern San Simeon.
- 12 – Continuing northwest past the point now home to a lighthouse, called Piedras Blancas, to a creek now called Arroyo de la Laguna.
- 13 – Continuing northwest past the point now home to a lighthouse, called Piedras Blancas, to Carpoforo Creek just south of Rocky Point. On the north side of the creek, the Santa Lucia Mountains (so named by Vizcaíno) rise abruptly from the sea to form the rugged Big Sur coastline.
- 14–15 – Seeing that it would be difficult to continue along the coast, the party stopped here while the scouts went out to find a way through the mountains.
- 16–20 – The scouts having prepared a trail, the party set out to the east-northeast up Carpoforo Creek. They spent the next several days struggling through rugged mountain back country that is still wild today, part of Los Padres National Forest. The journey also crosses into modern Monterey County, California.
- 21–23 – Emerging from the mountains, the party camped on the river later named Nacimiento, inside modern U.S Army Reserve Fort Hunter Liggett. The main party rested here, near a native village, while the scouts again went ahead.
- 24 – North-northeast over a range of low hills to the San Antonio River, near modern Jolon. Crespí noted that the river valley was "not unworthy of a good settlement" and, about 5 miles upstream (northwest) from this campsite, Junipero Serra founded Mission San Antonio de Padua in 1771, third of the eventual 21 missions. The river presumably took its name from the mission.
- 25 – Due north across the river valley and up Jolon Valley into the next range of hills, where they found a small pool of water.
- 26 – Over the crest and down into another arroyo, which they followed northeast out into the Salinas Valley, camping at Salinas River near today's King City.
- 27 – Following the river downstream (northwest), the party crossed to the other side and camped near today's Metz.
- 28 – Again following the river, the camp was between today's Soledad and Gonzales.
- 29 – On the Salinas River near today's Chualar.
- 30 – To a point on the river just south of modern Salinas. From this camp the scouts range ahead and reach Monterey Bay, but failed to recognize it as the port described by Vizcaíno. The expedition leaders feared they had missed the great port they sought, because of the long inland detour.
October 1769
- See Fray Juan Crespí diary (Bolton), pages 203–228
- 1 –
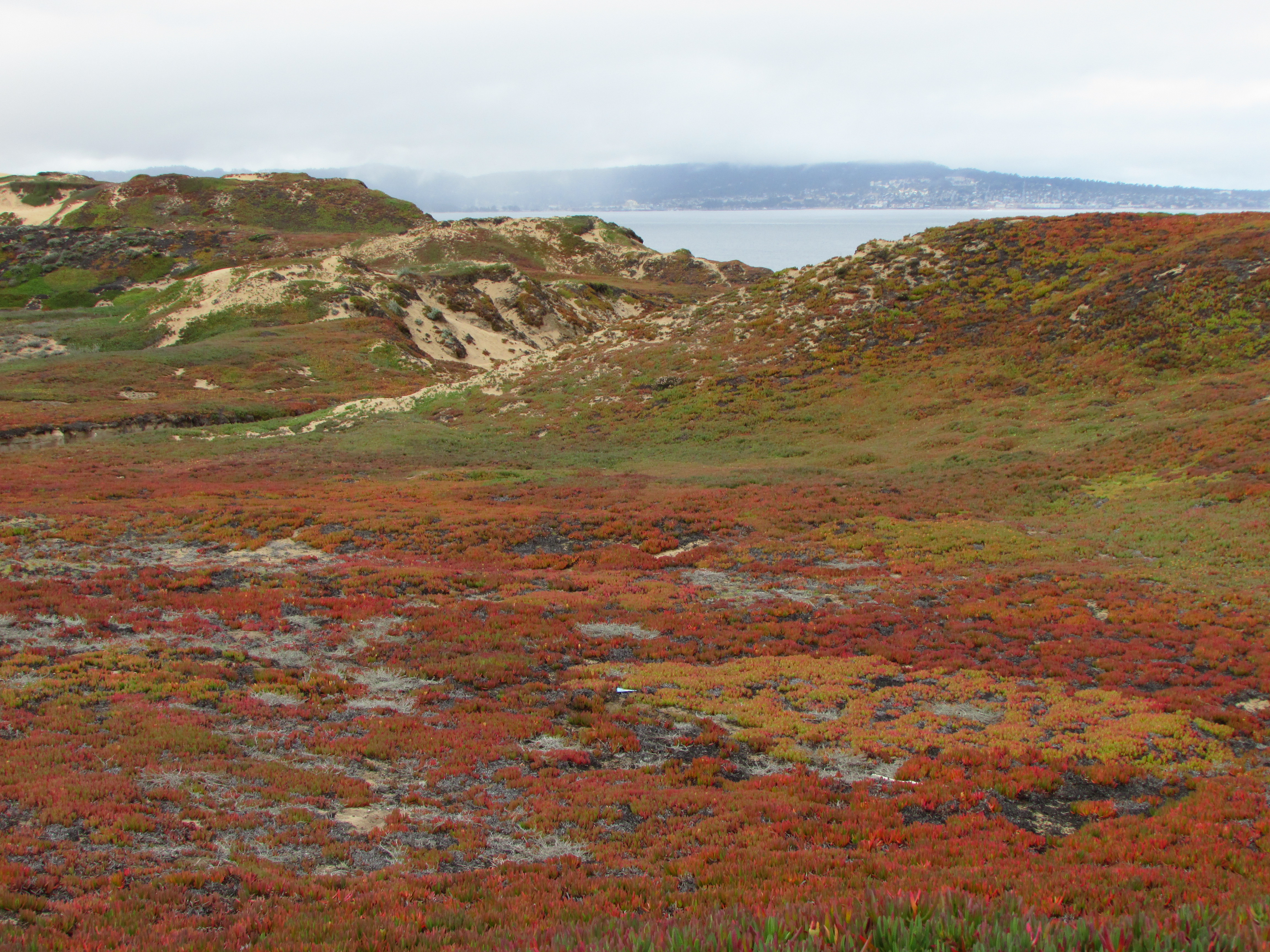
  View from the coastal sand dunes of Fort Ord, looking southwest toward Monterey
  The camp was moved a couple of miles closer to the bay, still on the river near present-day Blanco, about 4 miles from the bay. From the camp, Portolá, Constanzó, Crespí and five soldiers climbed a hill to get a view of the Monterey Bay for the first time. Exactly which hill is unclear, but it was within Fort Ord, a former U.S. army base that closed in 1994. The back country where the explorers climbed the hill was used for infantry training, so the low sandy hills are still mostly bare and accessible by hiking trails. From the hill, they could see Point Pinos, which defines the southern end of Monterey Bay and was one of the coastal landmarks they were looking for. It was decided to explore in that direction (the point no longer has many pines; it is occupied by a lighthouse and golf course at the western end of the city of Pacific Grove).
- 2–3 – The main camp remained in place while Captain Rivera took 8 soldiers to explore the Monterey Peninsula and farther south, seeing mouth of the Carmel River at today's Carmel River State Beach. They returned on the 3rd, still failing to recognize either Monterey harbor or the Carmel River as the places named and described by Vizcaíno.
- 4 – Portolá calls a meeting of the officers (including the two priests) and asks for a vote on whether to continue north or return to San Diego. All agree to continue.
- 5–6 – Sergeant Ortega departs with the scouts to mark the trail. They go as far as the Pajaro River, which they mistake for the Carmel River, and conclude that Vizcaíno's great port must not be much further on.
- 7 – The entire party sets out to the north, making camp in the vicinity of modern Castroville.
- 8–9 – Continuing north, staying inland of Elkhorn Slough, the expedition came to a deserted native village near the river seen by the scouts, a large stuffed bird is found, so the soldiers named the place Río del Pájaro, the name it retains today. Today, the river is the southern border of Santa Cruz County. Just across the river is the city of Watsonville. Because many of the men were ill, the party stayed an extra day. From this point on through Santa Cruz county, all of the native villages were found deserted.
- 10–14 – Staying a few miles inland because of the numerous estuaries and wetlands near the coast, the expedition crosses the Pajaro Valley and makes camp at one of the lakes north of Watsonville, possibly the one now called Pinto Lake. On this march, the expedition first saw the tree they called palo colorado, which translates as "redwood". Once again, the main party rested for several days at this camp while the scouts went ahead.
- 15 – Turning to the northwest to match the curve of the bay, the party crossed Corralitos Creek and headed toward a pass through the hills. The campsite was at a small lake, possibly the one known today as Corralitos Lagoon.
- 16 – Northwest, trending more and more toward west as the expedition nears the north end of Monterey Bay, along the route of today's Freedom Boulevard and back to Highway 1 near the coast, Bolton speculated that the camp this day was at Soquel Creek.
- 17 – Now heading due west, the party reaches a large river, crosses and makes camp on the west side. Crespí names the river San Lorenzo – still its name today. The campsite was in what is now downtown Santa Cruz, California.
- 18 – Starting out west-northwest along the coast, the party finds a creek after "500 steps", which Crespí names Santa Cruz. The creek gave its name to Mission Santa Cruz in 1791, and still later to the county and city. Oddly, though, the creek is no longer called Santa Cruz. Camp for the night was at what is now called Majors Creek (Coja Creek at the time of Bolton's book), near the coast. This creek forms part of the western border of Wilder Ranch State Park.
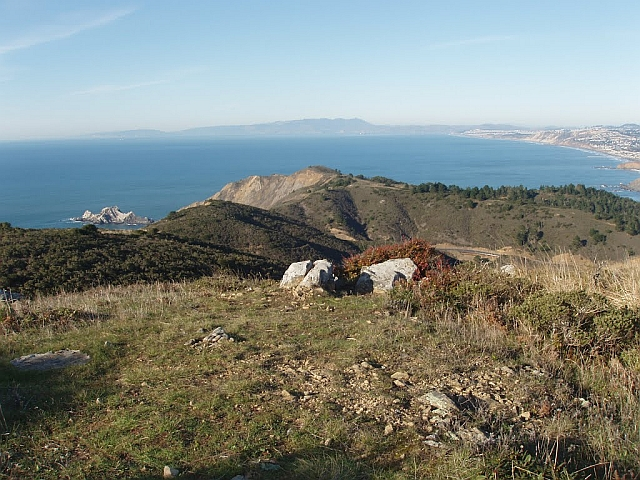
  View north from San Pedro Mtn., Point Reyes in distance at far left, Pacifica to the right
- 19 – Following the coast as it curves more to the northwest, the next camp was at today's Scott Creek, a popular wind-surfing beach near the community of Swanton.
- 20–22 – Northwest to Waddell Creek, now part of Big Basin Redwoods State Park. The explorers recognized Vizcaíno's Point Año Nuevo just ahead, but also some high cliffs blocking the way. The main party halts while the scouts go ahead.
- 23 – Passing the cliffs on the beach, the party crossed into today's San Mateo County. Traversing the level terrace that forms Point Ano Nuevo, Bolton speculated that they camped at today's Gazos Creek.
- 24–26 – Heading now due north, mostly over level coastal terraces, a long march brought the explorers to the creek at present-day San Gregorio, California. Rest and recovery for the next two days.
- 27 – North to present-day Purisima Creek, not far south of Half Moon Bay
- 28–29 – North to one of the small creeks between Half Moon Bay and Pillar Point Harbor. Because of heavy rain and illness, the party rested the next day.
- 30 – Resuming the march north, the expedition camped at or near San Vicente Creek, in present-day Moss Beach, California.
- 31 – Blocked from easy progress near the beach by Montara Mountain and Pedro Mountain just to the north, the party climbs up and over. This spot has long been known as Devil's Slide, where the coast highway was in constant danger of sliding away into the Pacific Ocean. From the ridge, they recognized the "Bay of San Francisco" described in the "itinerary of the pilot Cabrera Bueno" (their guidebook). It is the large curve of coastline between the projecting end of the mountains below where they stood and Point Reyes far to the northwest. Offshore, they saw the Farallon Islands for the first time, also landmarks they were looking for. The sight convinced some, but not all of them that they had definitely passed the port of Monterey. Descending the ridge, they camped at San Pedro Creek, at the south end of today's city of Pacifica.
November 1769
- See Fray Juan Crespí diary (Bolton), pages 229–243
- 1 – The expedition establishes a base at San Pedro Creek, while Ortega and the scouts depart on a 3-day mission to explore the area. None of the expedition diarists went with Ortega, and the diaries don't describe the exact route followed by the scouts, so it's not clear when the Ortega group first saw San Francisco Bay and where they were at that moment.
- 2 – Another group asks for and receives permission to go out hunting from the San Pedro Creek base. Constansó wrote (and Crespí's diary uses almost exactly the same words):
  Several of the soldiers requested permission to go hunting, as many deer had been seen. Some of them went quite a long way from the camp and reached the top of the hills so that they did not return until after nightfall. They said that to the north of the bay they had seen an immense arm of the sea or estuary, which extended inland as far as they could see, to the southeast...
  The hunters in this unnamed group were thus the first to report back to expedition leaders the sighting of San Francisco Bay. Ortega's scouts, however, because they left camp a day earlier, were probably the first to see the bay.
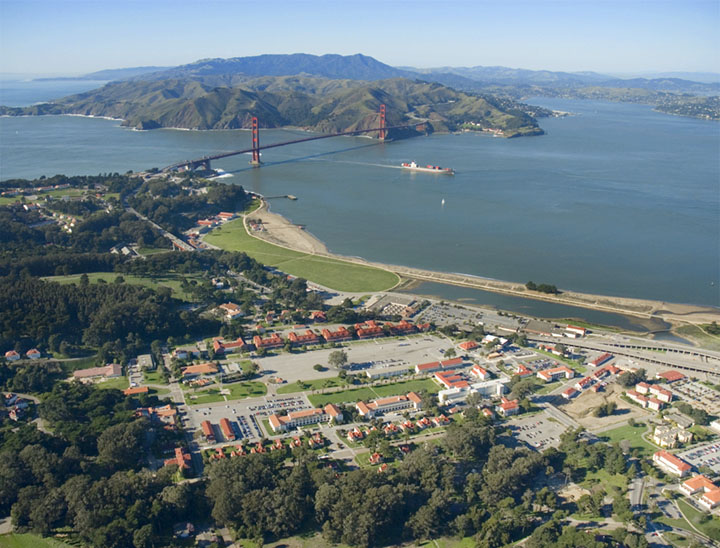
  Can't get there from here – the Golden Gate didn't have a bridge in 1769.
  The hunters also saw and reported that further progress to the north was blocked by the wide bay entrance channel (later named the Golden Gate by John C. Fremont. As Crespí wrote:
  We conjectured also from these reports that the explorers could not have crossed to the opposite shore which was seen to the north, and consequently, would not succeed in exploring the point which we judge to be that of Los Reyes, for it would be impossible in the three days that they were to be gone to make the detour that they would unavoidably have to make to round the estuary, whose extent the hunters represented as being very great.
  Crespí also quotes a revealing passage from the expedition's guidebook, in which Cabrera Bueno described what he called the "Bahia de San Francisco":
  Through the opening in the center enters an estuary of salt water without any breaking of the waves at all, and by going in one will find friendly Indians and can easily take on water and wood.
  Crespí thought that this passage described the entrance to the huge "estuary" the scouts had just found. If Crespí's interpretation was correct, then the discovery of San Francisco Bay happened many years earlier (Cabrera Bueno's Navegación Espéculativa y Práctica was published in 1734).
- 3 – The scouts returned after dark, with news they had "learned or inferred" from some natives – that two days' march farther on there was a harbor with a ship in it. This information turned out to be false, but it inspired the expedition leaders to push ahead for a few more days.
- 4 – The entire party climbed Sweeney Ridge, where there's a spot now marked as the San Francisco Bay Discovery Site. Portolá, Constansó and Crespí all saw the great bay to the east. To the north, however, the Golden Gate cannot be seen from the ridge – blocked from view by the intervening San Bruno Mountain. Descending the inland side of the ridge toward the southeast, camp was made in the valley of San Andreas Creek, near today's San Andreas Lake, or possibly another parallel valley to the west (Bolton).
- 5 – Continuing southeast in the same valley (formed by the San Andreas Fault), camp was made near today's Crystal Springs Dam.
- 6 – Continuing in the same direction to today's San Francisquito Creek, just past the Stanford Linear Accelerator.
- 7–9 – Portolá decided to halt the main party and send the scouts out again, in an attempt to find the aforementioned harbor and ship. They were given four days.
- 10 – The scouts returned with discouraging news – they had found no harbor or ship, and now doubted that they had correctly understood what the natives were trying to tell them. They had rounded the southern end of the bay and traveled up the east side far enough to see San Pablo Bay (actually the northern arm of San Francisco Bay) – which may have been as far north as modern Richmond.
- 11 – Portolá convened another officers' council, which unanimously agreed that 1) they must have passed Monterey, 2) it was time to turn around and retrace their steps back to San Diego, and 3) no one would be left behind hoping a supply ship will arrive. The campsite that night was a few miles back to the north into the San Andreas rift valley. (Note: on p. 236 of the Crespí diary translation, Bolton includes in a footnote a lengthy translation of the Manila galleon pilot José Cabrera Bueno's description of Monterey Bay, as he saw it from shipboard while sailing south).
- 12 – To San Andreas Creek (same camp as Nov. 4)
- 13 – To San Pedro Creek (same camp as Nov. 1–3)
- 14–15 – To San Vicente Creek (same camp as Oct. 30)
- 16 – To Half Moon Bay (same camp as Oct. 29)
- 17 – To Tunitas Creek
- 18 – To Pescadero Creek
- 19 – To Año Nuevo Creek
- 20 – To Scott Creek (same camp as Oct. 19)
- 21 – To Coja (Majors) Creek (same camp as Oct. 18)
- 22 – To Soquel Creek (same camp as Oct. 16)
- 23 – To a lake near Watsonville (same camp as Oct. 10–14)
- 24–25 – To a lake "one league" south of the Pajaro River
- 26 – To Blanco (same camp as Oct. 1–6)
- 27 – To one of the small lakes now in the city of Monterey, possibly the one called Lake El Estero. On Portolá's return to the area later in 1770, the Presidio of Monterey was established nearby.
- 28 – South across the Monterey Peninsula to Carmel Bay, across the Carmel River to camp north of Point Lobos
- 29 – Dec. 6 – The main party stayed at this camp, while Captain Rivera went south with a scouting party.
December 1769
- See Fray Juan Crespí diary (Bolton), pages 244–262
- 4 – Rivera's party returns, having explored the Santa Lucia Mountains and rugged coastline to the south, an area now called Big Sur. Rivera concluded that travel along that stretch of coast would be too difficult, just as it was when approached from the south on September 13.
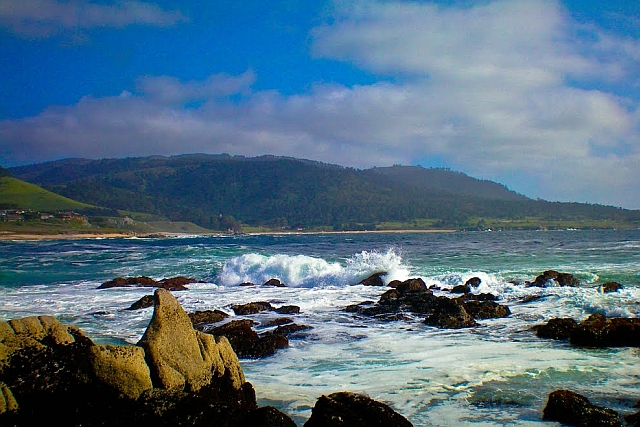
  Looking south from Carmel River mouth toward the northern edge of the Santa Lucia Mountains
- 5–6 – While waiting for two of the native neophytes who got separated from Rivera's group, various courses of action are discussed. The expedition leaders still didn't believe they had found Vizcaíno's port of Monterey. Crespí wrote:
  ...below Monterey, which is the goal of our long journey, we recognize some marks, such as Sierra de Santa Lucia...and the Point of Pines. But no harbor at all is found...
- 7 – The officers' council meets again, and the decision is made to return to San Diego without waiting any longer for the missing men or for a supply ship (which never came).
- 8–9 – Stormy weather delayed the departure.
- 10 – Portolá ordered that a large wooden cross be planted where it could be seen by passing ships, and a letter describing the expedition's travels was buried at its foot. Crespí quoted part of the letter as saying: "The cross was planted on a hill on the edge of the beach of the little bay which lies to the south of the Point of Pines". Today, the nearest beaches to the south of the point are along 17-Mile Drive. The letter went on to say that another cross had been set up on Monterey Bay, "where the sand dunes and a lagoon are". The expedition camped for the night near that spot in Monterey (same camp as Nov. 27).
- 11 – The expedition camped at Blanco (same camp as Oct. 1–6 and Nov. 26).
- 12–15 – Southeast on the Salinas River (same camps as Sep. 26–29)
- 16–26 – Leaving the Salinas Valley near today's King City, the expedition retraces its trail through the Santa Lucia Mountains and down the coast to the San Luis Obispo area. The main mission road abandoned this part of Portolá's trail after 1774, when Juan Bautista de Anza established a new route from Mission San Luis Obispo to Mission San Antonio de Padua over the Cuesta grade.
- 27–31 – Instead of turning south to follow San Luis canyon as before, the party continued southeast toward the modern community Edna before turning south into Price Canyon. From that point they followed the earlier trail, returning to Guadalupe on Dec. 31 (same camp as Sep. 1)
January 1770
- See Fray Juan Crespí diary (Bolton), pp. 263–273
- 1–11 – Still following the earlier trail near the coast, the expedition returned to the Ventura River on Jan. 11.
- 12–13 – From Ventura, the earlier trail led up the Santa Clara River and well away from the coast. This time, however, a native guide showed the explorers a shortcut over today's Conejo Grade and through Conejo Valley – the route now followed by U.S. Route 101. They camped near native villages both nights.
- 14 – Still following the native guides, the expedition heads east but the pack train is unable to negotiate the rugged pass east of today's Agoura. Returning to the village, another guide took them by a gentler route northeast through today's Simi Valley.
- 15 – Heading east out of Simi Valley via Santa Susana Pass, the expedition returns to its earlier trail at the place Crespí now calls (in his diary) "Los Robles" (same camp as Aug. 7).
- 16 – Rather than leave the San Fernando Valley south through Sepulveda Pass, as before, the expedition headed southeast and through today's Cahuenga Pass, camping near the southern end.
- 17 – Fording the "Porciúncula" (Los Angeles) River, the expedition re-entered the San Gabriel Valley and camped at the July 30 campground on the San Gabriel River.
- 18 – On this day, the expedition again departed from its earlier route. Instead of going southeast from "La Puente", then south over the Puente
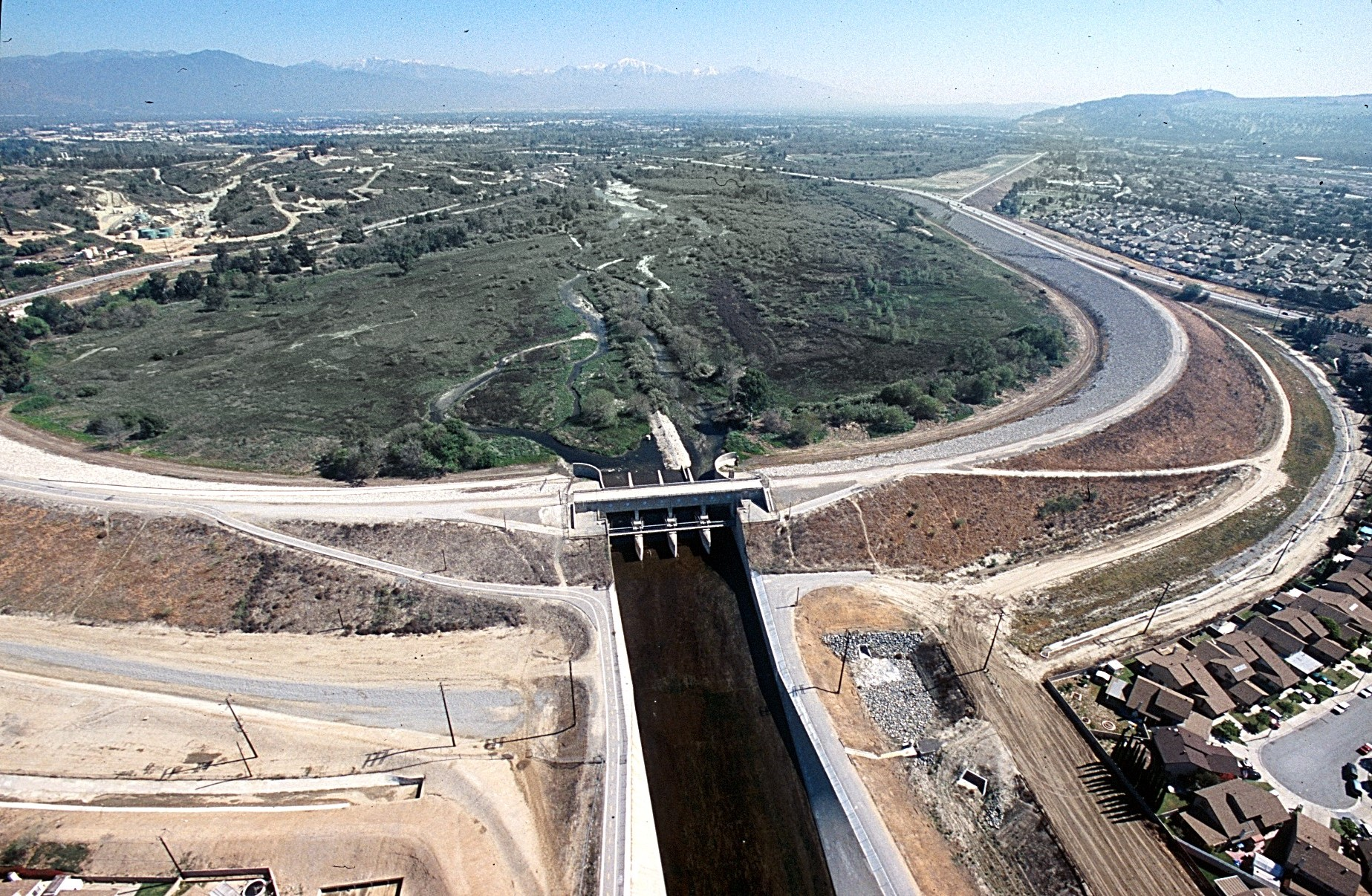
  The view north through the Rio Hondo spillway of today's Whittier Narrows Dam, near the San Gabriel River
  Hills at La Habra, the travelers continued southwest along the San Gabriel River through the gap now called Whittier Narrows. Passing the Puente Hills on their left, they then turned to the southeast and picked up the earlier trail en route to the Santa Ana River (July 28 camp).
- 19 – To the July 26 campground (Irvine)
- 20 – To the July 23 campground (San Juan Creek)
- 21 – To San Onofre Creek (one creek south of the July 22 camp)
- 22 – To San Luis Rey (July 18–19 campground)
- 23 – To San Dieguito River (July 15 campground)
- 24 – The expedition returned to San Diego. Crespí wrote of the expedition's fears, on that last day's march, about what would be left of those who stayed behind in San Diego. Most had been seriously ill with scurvy or other maladies, and there had been trouble with the local natives. But Father Serra, although ill, was recovering along with most of the others. The mission and presidio at San Diego survived and grew in the following years. Portolá, Rivera, Fages and Crespí all returned to Monterey that same year, while Serra went by sea on the San Antonio (which had returned from San Blas with supplies) and met them there. Apparently, however, no one kept a diary on that second journey to Monterey Bay, following the now-familiar trail.
