= Sawyer Camp Trail =

Trail in San Mateo County, California

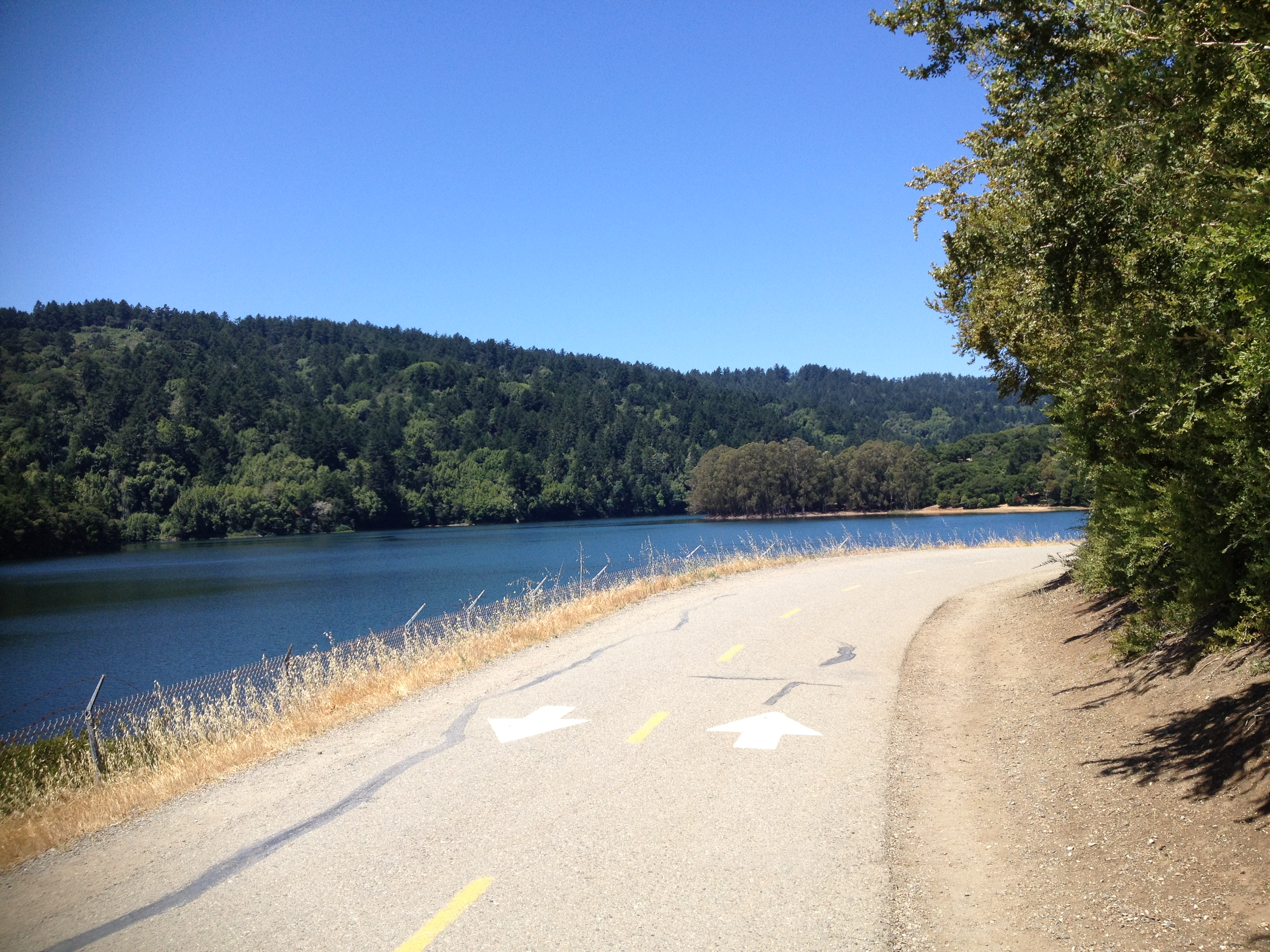
- Length: 6 mi (9.7 km)
- Location: San Mateo County, California
- Established: 1978
- Trailheads: N: 37.58884°N 122.413130°W, off Hillcrest Blvd near I-280; S: 37.530965°N 122.364658°W, off Crystal Springs Rd
- Use: Hiking
- Sights: Jepson Laurel

Sawyer Camp Trail is a popular 6-mile (9.7 km) trail located in the San Andreas Fault rift valley in San Mateo County, California near Hillsborough and the San Mateo Highlands. Officially, it is a segment of the longer Crystal Springs Regional Trail. Approximately 300,000 people use the trail every year. It provides excellent views of San Francisco Peninsula's Crystal Springs Watershed. The trail is managed by San Mateo County and surfaced in asphalt across its entire span. There is considerable biodiversity along the trail due to the variation in habitat and the presence of serpentine soils. In particular, the plant communities of Northern coastal scrub, grassland and California oak woodland are present.

== Path ==
Crystal Springs Regional Trail map (Nov 2018)

Starting from the south, the trail begins in a parking lot located just north of the Crystal Springs Dam. The southern end of the trail is located on the east side of Lower Crystal Springs Reservoir, near the intersection of Crystal Springs Road and State Route 35, and it generally heads north parallel to the long axis (i.e. north-south) of the reservoir.

The section of the trail north of reservoir passes by dense groves of trees before heading east on the San Andreas Dam. The last segment of the trail briefly parallels the eastern shore of the San Andreas Lake before the path heads northeast and ascends the Bay Hills. The path finally terminates on Hillcrest Boulevard right next to Interstate 280 in western Millbrae. Typically, more parking is available at the northern trailhead.

== History ==
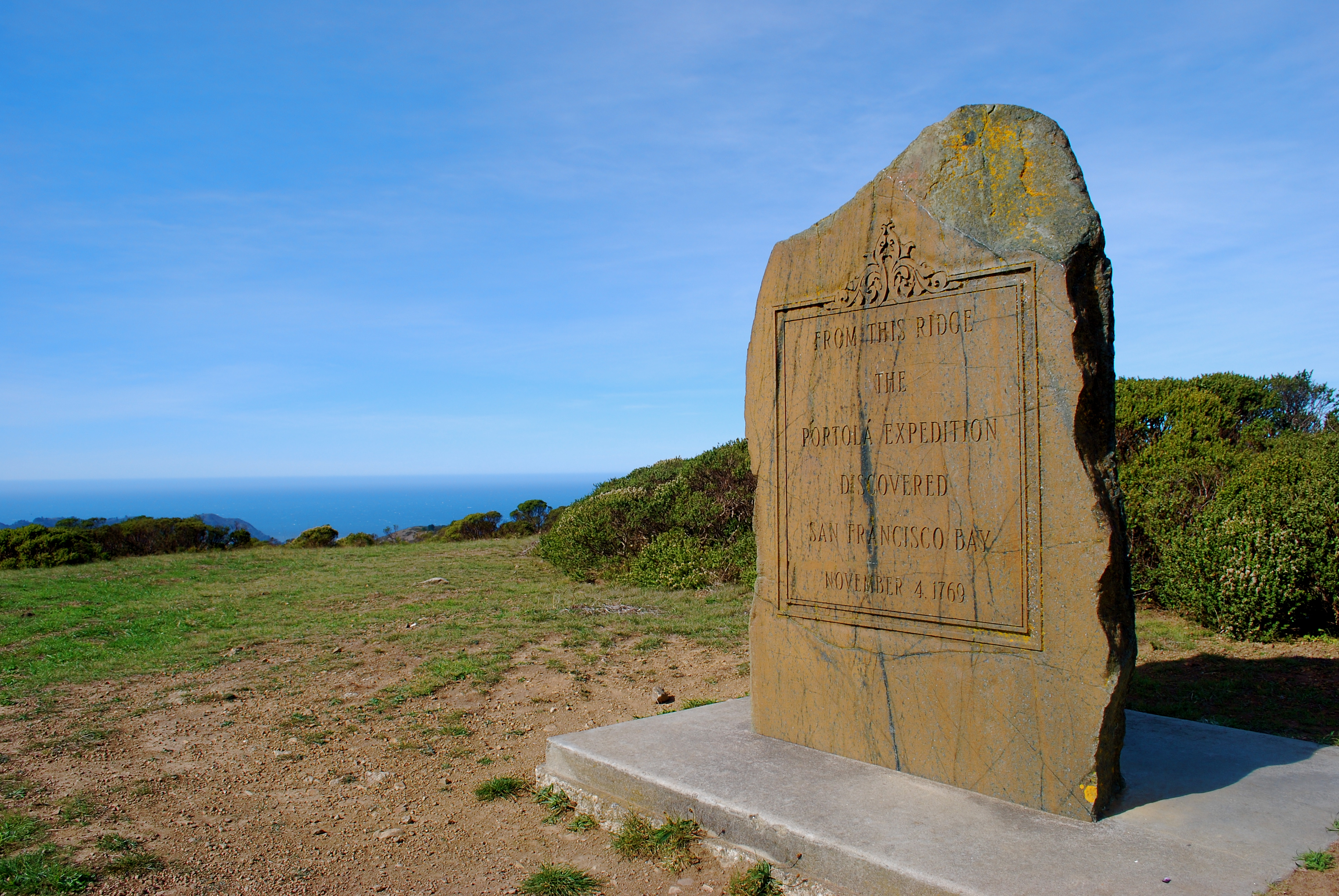
Marker for Portola discovery site at Sweeney Ridge

On November 4, 1769, Gaspar de Portola and his men camped north of here, after descending from Sweeney Ridge, where they were reputed to be the first white men to view the San Francisco Bay. Portola's camp is now beneath the waters of San Andreas Lake; a sign at the northern trail entrance on Hillcrest Boulevard points to it.

In November 1774, Captain Fernando Rivera, a principal officer of Portola's, and the first to lead a group to purposely explore the Peninsula, camped near one of the Shalshone villages. It was probably in the meadow near the large laurel tree now named the Jepson Laurel. His chaplain and diarist, Father Francisco Palou, named the area San Andreas, honoring that saint's feast day. The entire valley was later granted to Domingo Feliz as part of a 4,448-acre (1,800 ha) rancho.

=== Leander Sawyer ===
Leander Sawyer became active in this area soon after he purchased the land in 1853. He probably lived in a small adobe built near a natural spring in the hill, just southwest of the Jepson Laurel. Sawyer also kept an inn nearby to dispense food to picnickers, and to serve as a lodging place for horsemen traveling through the area. By 1859, Sawyer had built the house, a barn, and a fence; he raised horses and trained them for the circus. During the 1850s and 60s, Sawyer also grazed cattle in the area to keep down the brush and make a better area for incoming wagons; the area gradually became known as Sawyer Camp. No trace of Sawyer Camp remains today; a grove of eucalyptus trees marks the area where it once stood, although a nearby structure, the Sawyer Camp Cottage, was constructed in 1895 and rebuilt in 1932, to house a caretaker for the Crystal Springs Reservoir.

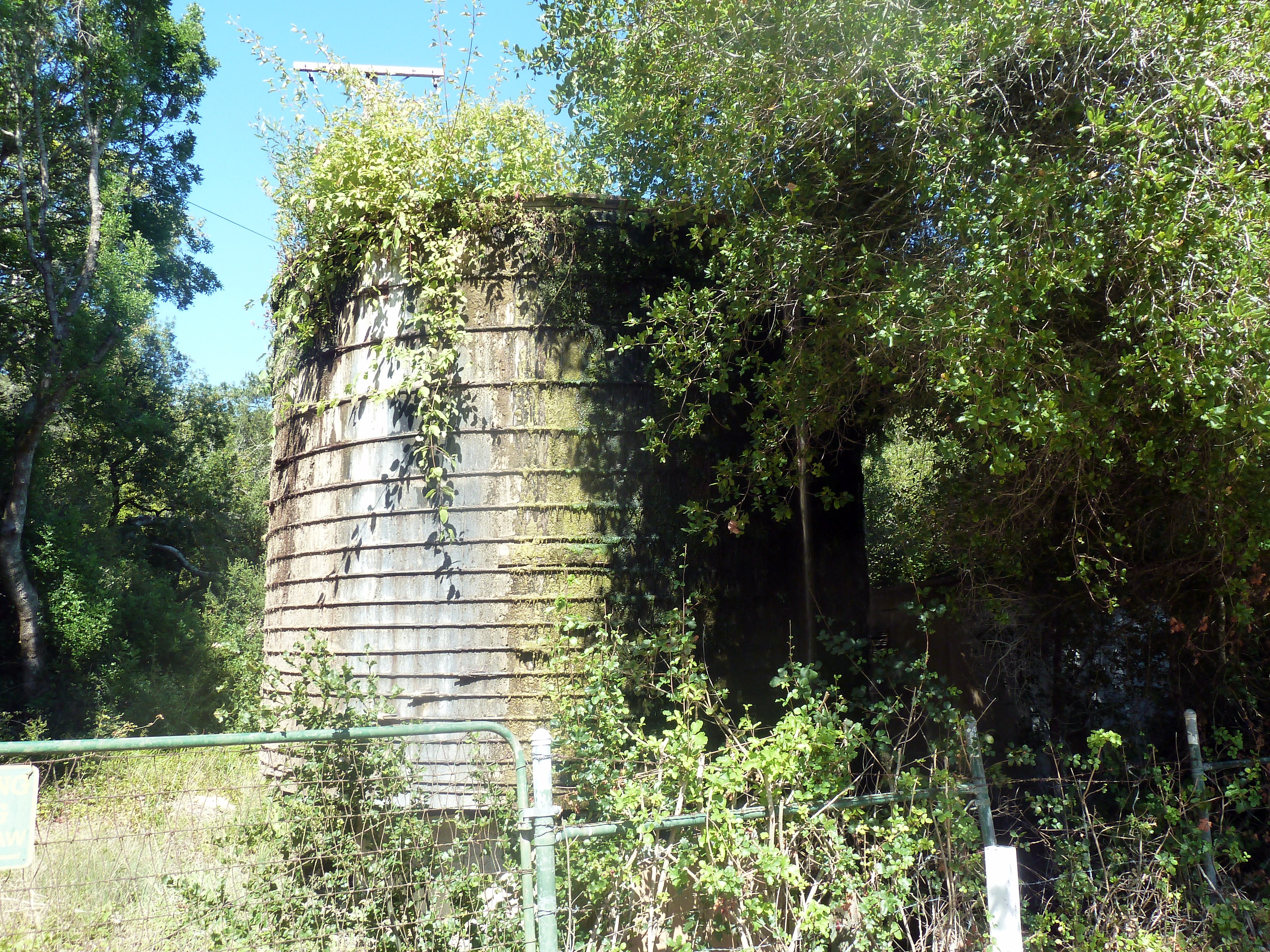
Water tower along Sawyer Camp Trail

The road along San Andreas Creek was named San Andreas Valley Road. San Andreas Valley Road, or just Valley Road, was once the main highway between San Francisco and Half Moon Bay. Wagons pulled by teams of horses hauled wood over the road. Later, the trail was used by the stagecoach from Millbrae, which connected with the San Mateo Stageline to Half Moon Bay (then known as Spanish Town). Sawyer briefly ran his own competing stagecoach line between San Mateo and Half Moon Bay.

The Spring Valley Water Company purchased 2,200 acres (890 ha) named the "Sawyer Tract" by 1876. After the construction of Crystal Springs Dam, which formed the Lower Crystal Springs Reservoir, the inn and much of the old road was flooded by 1888. A narrow, winding gravel access road was built along the present-day route of Sawyer Camp Trail. When the city of San Francisco took over the watershed lands, Sawyer Camp Trail was then a county road. The Water Department fenced it for the protection of San Francisco's drinking water. The mostly gravel road was open for vehicular traffic from dawn to dusk, until 1978.

In 1978, the San Mateo County Board of Supervisors designated the road a non-vehicular recreation trail, and paved it for bicycles with funds provided by the State Department of Parks and Recreation. It also served many hikers, joggers, and equestrians, and is one of the most popular facilities operated by the San Mateo County Parks Department. More than 300,000 people visit Sawyer Camp Trail per year.

=== The Jepson Laurel ===
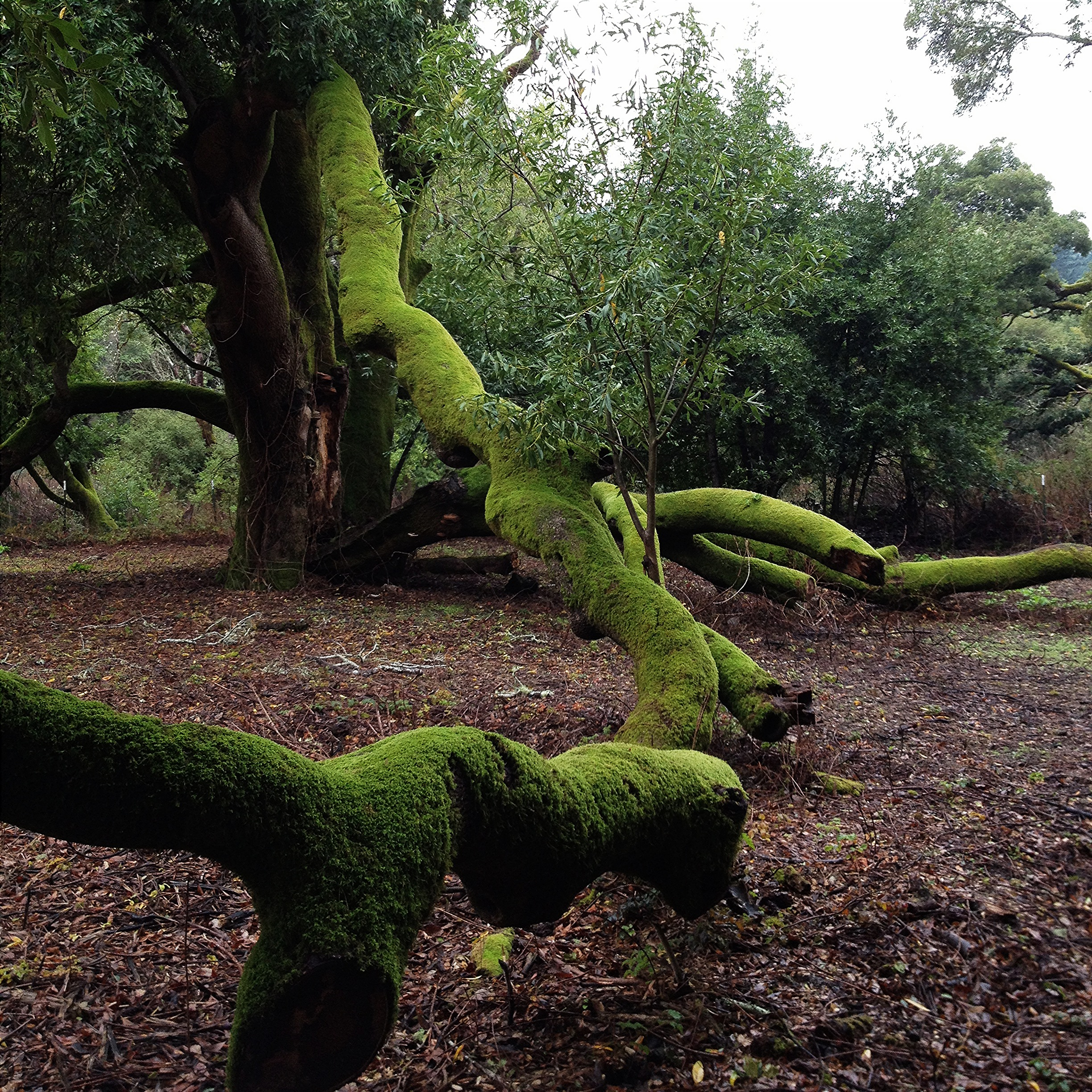
Jepson Laurel along Sawyer Camp Trail (2013)

It is one of the most famous landmarks along Sawyer Camp Trail, and it has been established to be over 600 years old. It is now the largest Laurel in California.

On April 15, 1923, this tree was named in honor of Willis Linn Jepson, one of California's most noted botanists. At that time, it measured 22 ft 4 in (6.81 m) in circumference and 55 feet (17 m) tall; there was only one larger Laurel known in the State. It grew along the Russian River near Cloverdale, but was cut down "because it shaded too much hayfield."

This vulnerable tree was finally fenced to protect it from soil compacting, which could conceivably weaken its roots. The San Francisco Water Department, on whose property it is located, assumed the tree's preservation and protection.

In 1981, San Mateo County Parks, on permit from the Water Department, opened the area near the tree and constructed a picnic area. California Laurel (Umbellularia californica), also known as Bay Tree, Pepperwood, and Oregon Myrtle, has a wood which is heavy, hard, fine grained, and exceptionally strong.

== Recreation ==
Some of the most popular recreational activities on the trail include walking, jogging, and cycling. Dogs are not allowed. Much of the trail is marked with a center stripe to minimize conflict with those traveling in opposite directions and distances from the ends of the trail are indicated on posts every 1/2 mile (800 m).

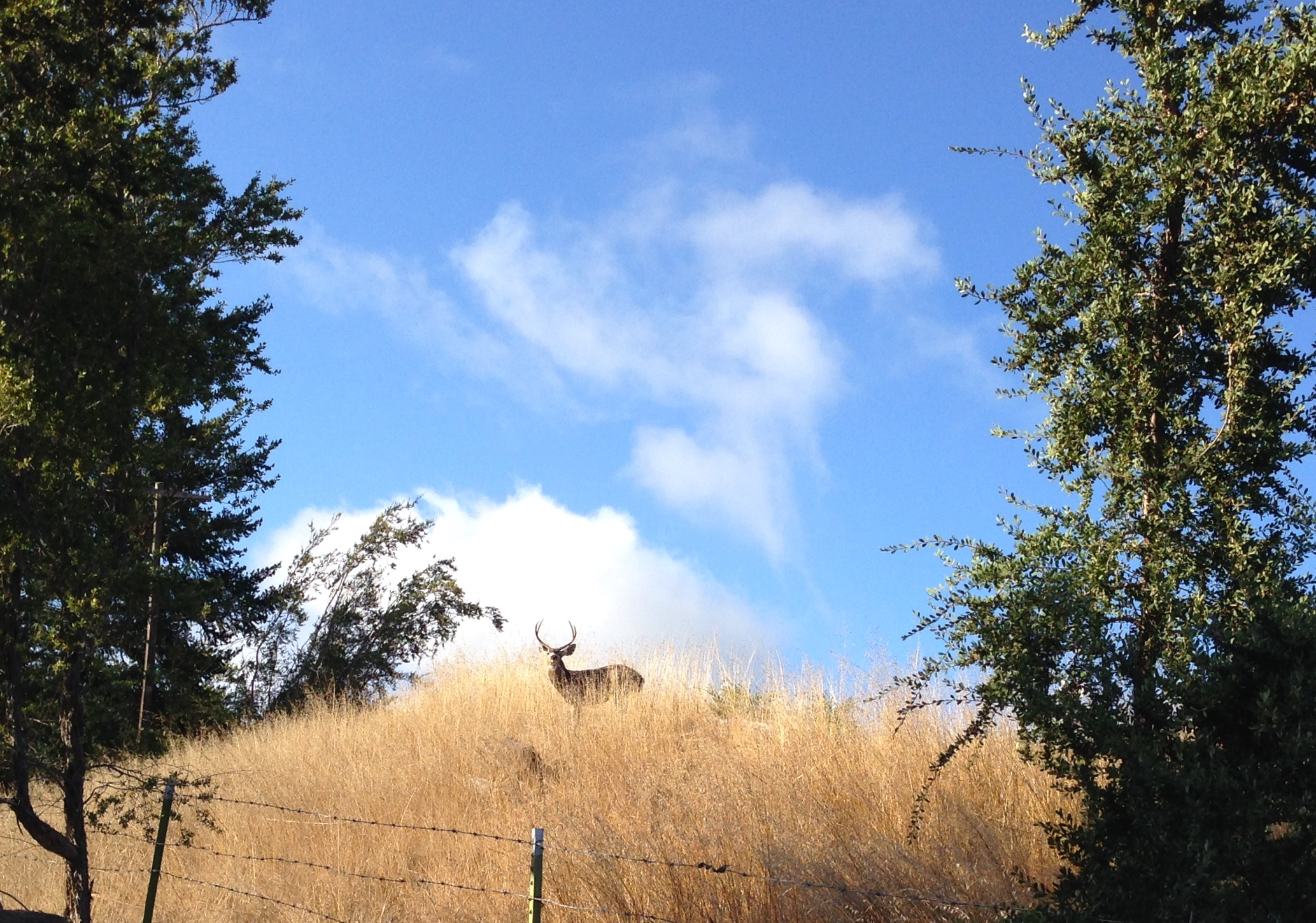
Deer at Sawyer Camp Trail

== Nature ==
Virtually all of the trail runs alongside the scenic Crystal Springs Reservoir. It is common to see ducks, deer, and rabbits.
