= Crystal Springs Regional Trail =

County park in California, United States

Coordinates: 37.53525°N 122.37053°W

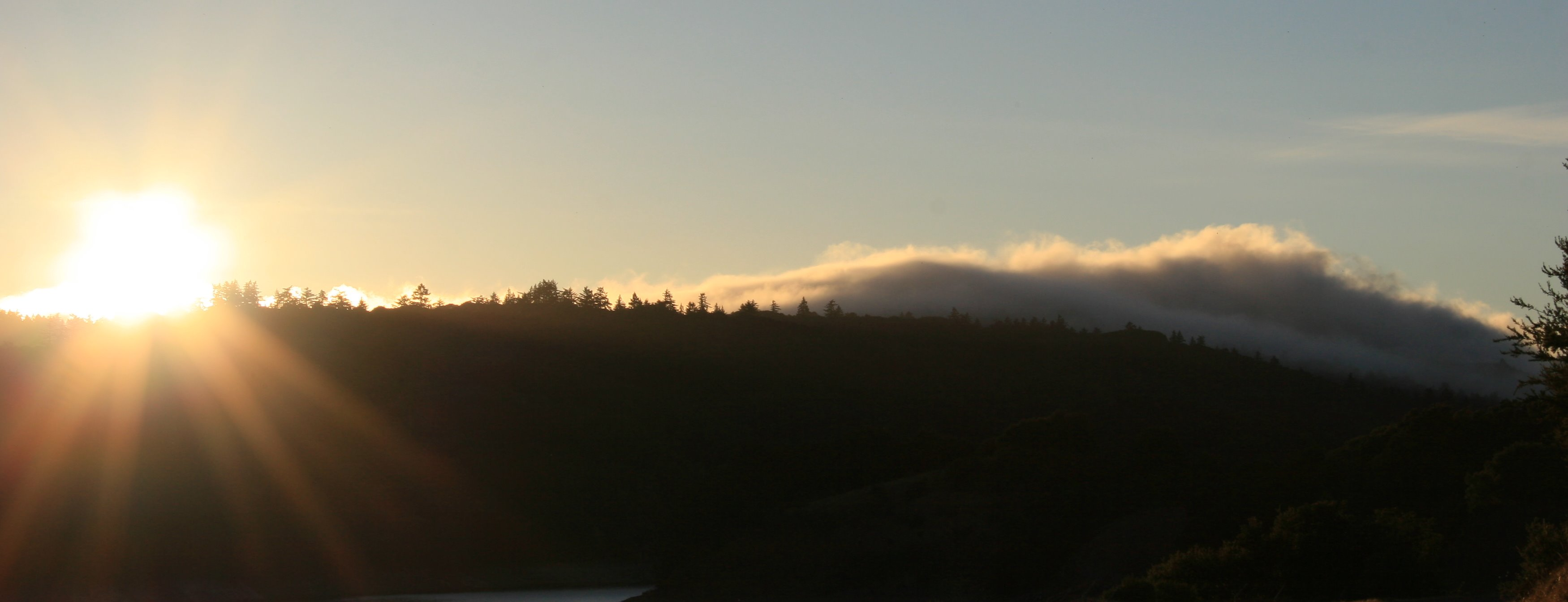
Summer sunset at Crystal Springs

Crystal Springs Regional Trail is a county park located between San Bruno to the north and Woodside to the south. The park comprises three main trails: Crystal Springs Trail on the south, Sawyer Camp Trail in the middle, and San Andreas Trail in the northern section, which run along the eastern shore of San Andreas Lake in San Mateo County.

Settled thousands of years ago by the Shalshone Indians, the Crystal Springs Reservoir (separate from San Andreas Lake to the north) is currently part of the City of San Francisco's Hetch Hetchy Reservoir water system.

Crystal Springs reservoir is long and narrow because it lies atop the San Andreas Fault. The famous fault runs right through the Crystal Springs Reservoir. Satellite images and maps show the long narrow San Andreas rift continuing north of San Francisco in Tomales Bay, in Point Reyes National Seashore in a straight line. The Crystal Springs Dam survived both the 1906 earthquake and the 1989 Loma Prieta quake with no damage whatsoever, according to the U.S. Geological Survey.
