= San Andreas Lake =

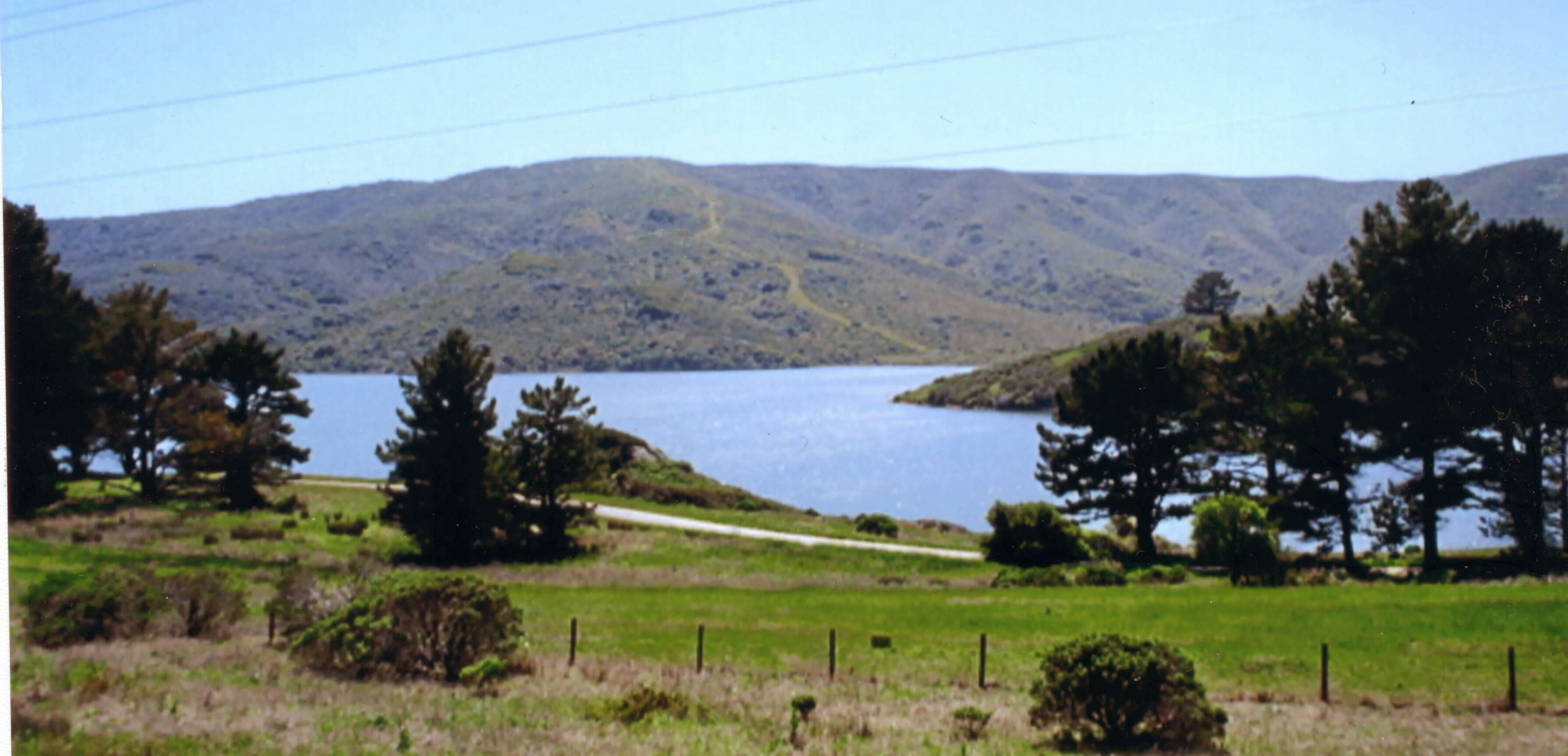

- Location within California Location within the United States
- Location: San Mateo County, California
- Coordinates: 37°35′36″N 122°25′27″W
- Type: Reservoir
- Primary inflows: San Andreas Creek
- Primary outflows: San Andreas Creek
- Catchment area: 4.4 sq mi (11 km^{2})
- Basin countries: United States
- Max. length: 4.8 km (3.0 mi)
- Surface area: 550 acres (220 ha)
- Water volume: 19,027 acre⋅ft (23,469,000 m^{3})
- Surface elevation: 453 ft (138 m)
- Settlements: Millbrae; San Bruno
- References: U.S. Geological Survey Geographic Names Information System: San Andreas Lake

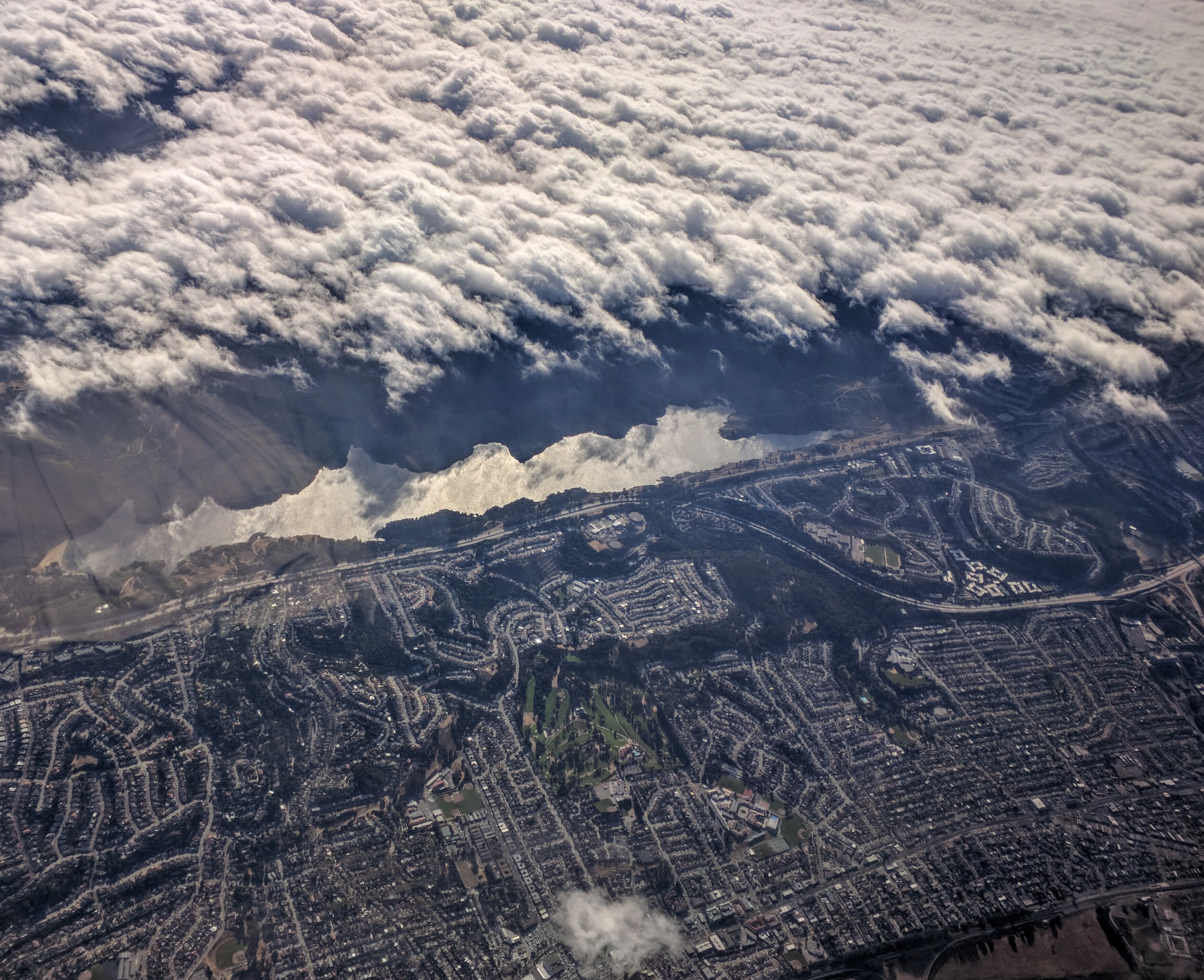
San Andreas Lake from the air, with portions of Millbrae and San Bruno in the foreground and the typical marine layer fog and clouds behind

San Andreas Lake is a reservoir adjacent to the San Francisco Peninsula cities of Millbrae and San Bruno in San Mateo County, California. It is situated directly on the San Andreas Fault, which is named after the valley it is in.

== History ==
After discovering San Francisco Bay from Sweeney Ridge on November 4, 1769, the Portolá expedition descended what Portolá called the Cañada de San Francisco, now San Andreas Creek, to camp in the vicinity of today's San Andreas Lake.

The next day they reached a "Laguna Grande" which today is covered by the Upper Crystal Springs Reservoir. The campsite is marked by California Historical Marker No. 94 "Portola Expedition Camp", located at Crystal Springs Dam, on Skyline Boulevard, 0.1 mi south of Crystal Springs Road. They camped here a second time on November 12, on their return trip.

Padre Palóu, on an expedition from Monterey to explore the western side of San Francisco Bay led by Captain Fernando Rivera y Moncada, renamed Portolá's Cañada de San Francisco to Cañada de San Andrés on November 30, 1774, it being the feast day of St. Andrew.

Captain Juan Bautista de Anza, after forging the first overland route from Monterey, California, to San Francisco Bay, explored the peninsula and selected the sites for Mission San Francisco de Asís (Mission Dolores) and the Presidio of San Francisco. De Anza returned to Monterey via the Cañada de San Andrés and camped on the banks of San Mateo Creek on March 29, 1776. In de Anza's diary on March 29, 1776, he wrote: "Night having fallen, at a quarter past six I went down to the arroyo of San Andreas and to another, that of San Matheo, where it descends to empty into the estuary..."

== Description ==
Originally a small natural sag pond, the lake was expanded by the construction of a 100 foot (30 m) high earth dam in 1868. The dam survived the 1906 earthquake despite the fact that the fault runs directly under the dam.

== Ecology ==
Construction of the 1868 dam would have trapped salmonids such as coho salmon (Oncorhynchus kisutch) and coastal rainbow trout (Oncorhynchus mykiss irideus) as both stream resident and steelhead life forms, both known to have been historically present in the San Mateo Creek watershed. San Mateo Creek once hosted coho salmon as evidenced by specimens collected by Professor Alexander Agassiz of Harvard University in the 1850s and 1860s. The historical presence of coho salmon is also suggested in an 1877 description by Charles Hallock: "Pilarcitos, one of the Spring Valley Water Company's reservoirs, is now well filled with fair-sized trout, and San Andreas, chiefly with silver salmon of generally moderate size".

== Public access ==
Since the lake is a public water source, it is closed to the public. However, hikers and bicyclists may travel along the eastern shores of the lake on a paved trail that runs just west of Skyline Boulevard from San Bruno Ave in San Bruno to Hillcrest Blvd in Millbrae. A connecting trail, called the Sawyer Camp Trail, crosses the rift valley on the San Andreas Dam. This 6 mile (10 km) trail eventually reaches the eastern shores of the Lower Crystal Springs reservoir and the Crystal Springs Dam.

== See also ==
- List of lakes in California
- List of lakes of the San Francisco Bay Area
