= San Francisco Bay Discovery Site =

- U.S. National Register of Historic Places
- U.S. National Historic Landmark
- California Historical Landmark
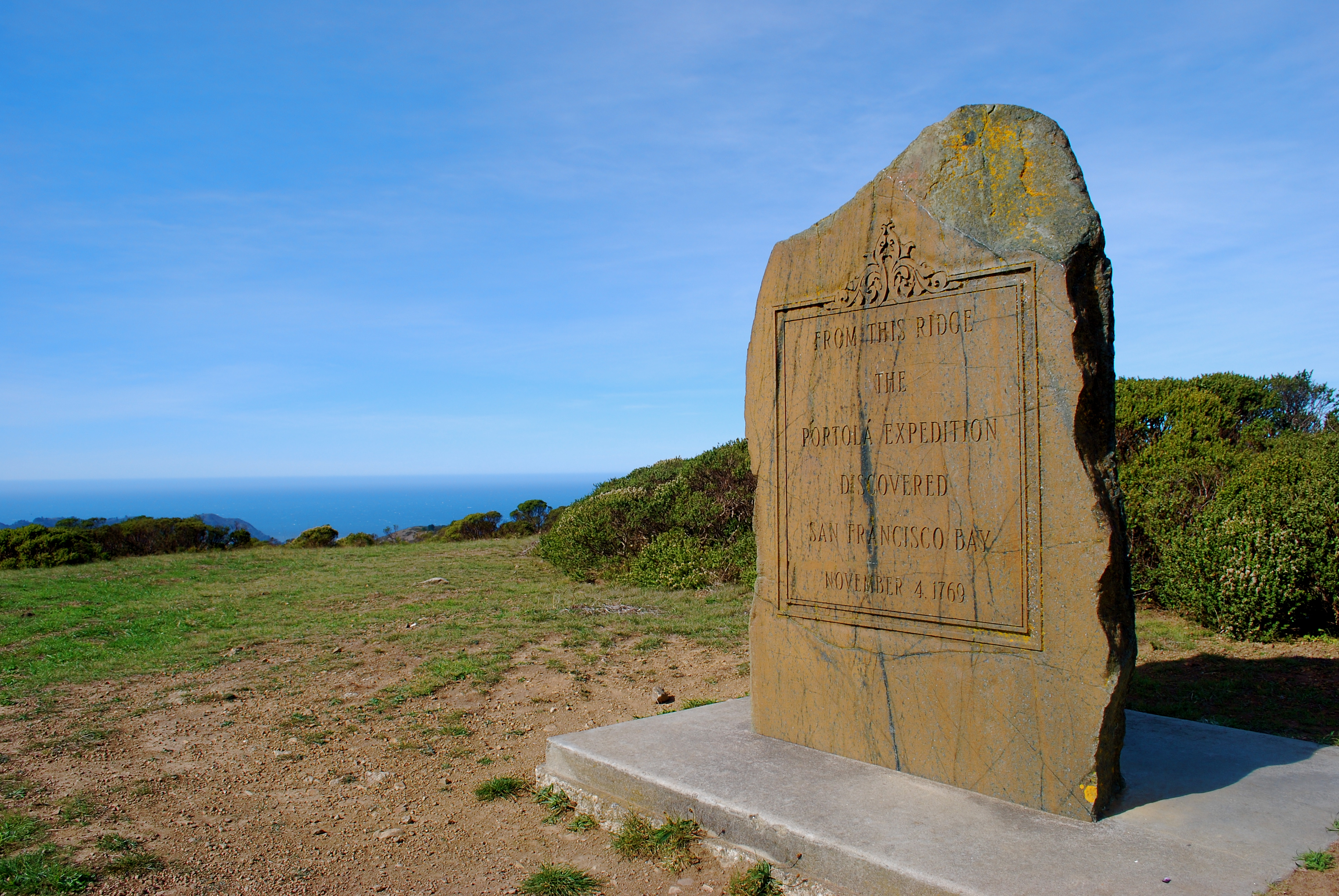
- Historical marker at Sweeney Ridge

- Location within San Francisco Bay Area Location within California Location within the United States
- Location: Golden Gate National Recreation Area
- Coordinates: 37°36′16″N 122°27′28″W
- Area: 18.2 acres (7.4 ha)
- Built: 1769
- NRHP reference No.: 68000022
- CHISL No.: 394

Significant dates
- Added to NRHP: May 23, 1968
- Designated NHL: May 23, 1968

The San Francisco Bay Discovery Site is a marker commemorating the first recorded European sighting of San Francisco Bay. In 1769, the Portola expedition traveled north by land from San Diego, seeking to establish a base at the Port of Monterey described by Sebastian Vizcaino in 1602. When they reached Monterey, however, they were not sure it was the right place and decided to continue north. The party reached San Pedro Creek on October 31 and camped there for four nights, while scouts led by José Francisco Ortega climbed Sweeney Ridge, where they could see over the ridge toward the east, and so became the first Europeans to see San Francisco Bay on November 1.

The scouts returned on November 3, and led the entire party up to the ridge on November 4. Franciscan missionary Juan Crespi noted in his diary, "from the summit of a peak we beheld the great estuary or arm of the sea." After seeing the immense bay to the east, and having learned from the scouts that further progress to the north would be blocked by the Golden Gate, the party turned southeast and descended toward the bay.

Sweeney Ridge is located in northern San Mateo County and is now a part of the Golden Gate National Recreation Area. The site is both a California Historical Landmark and a National Historic Landmark. The spot chosen for the marker is somewhat arbitrary, as the precise location where Portola's party reached the summit of the ridge is not known. The landmarked area encompasses two of the highest knolls on the ridge.

As of October 2020, the marker has been vandalized, with Portolà’s name and the date of the discovery chiseled away.

== See also ==
- List of National Historic Landmarks in California
- National Register of Historic Places listings in San Mateo County, California
