= San Andreas Creek =

San Andreas Creek San Andrés Creek,
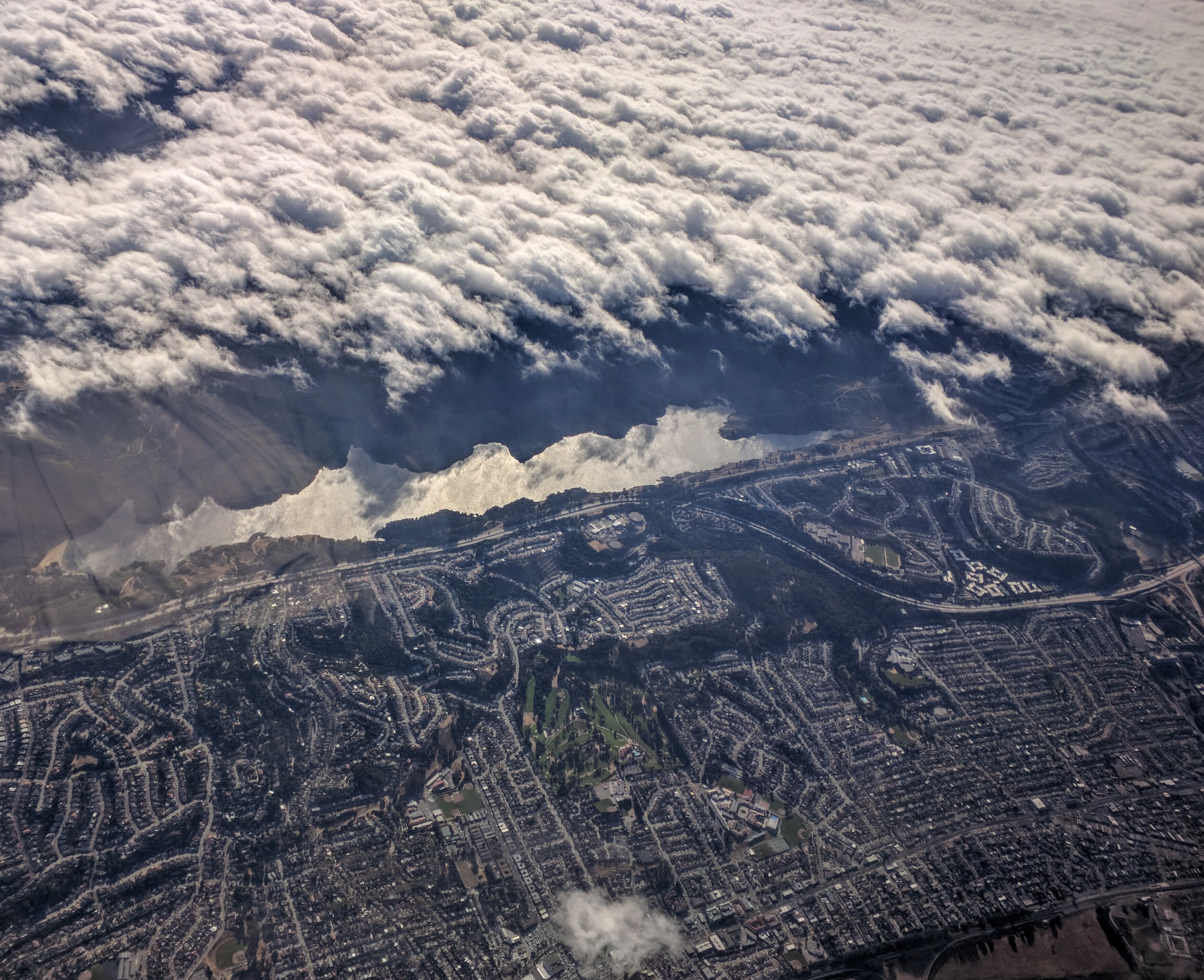
- San Andreas Creek's San Andreas Reservoir
- Etymology: Saint Andrew

Location
- Country: United States
- State: California
- Region: San Francisco Peninsula
- County: San Mateo County

Physical characteristics
- Source: East slope of Sweeney Ridge
  - coordinates: 37°37′01″N 122°27′29″W
  - elevation: 918 ft (280 m)
- Mouth: Confluence with Lower Crystal Springs Reservoir (originally with San Mateo Creek)
  - location: Pacifica, California
  - coordinates: 37°36′50″N 122°26′28″W
  - elevation: 285 ft (87 m)

San Andrés Creek (Spanish for: St. Andrew's Creek), now called San Andreas Creek, is a perennial stream that flows 5.9 miles (9.5 km) southeasterly along the San Andreas Fault from Sweeney Ridge in San Mateo County, California, providing the inflow to and outflow from San Andreas Reservoir, and then entering Lower Crystal Springs Reservoir, where it was a historic tributary to San Mateo Creek. San Mateo Creek then carries its waters over Crystal Springs Dam northeast to San Francisco Bay.

== History ==
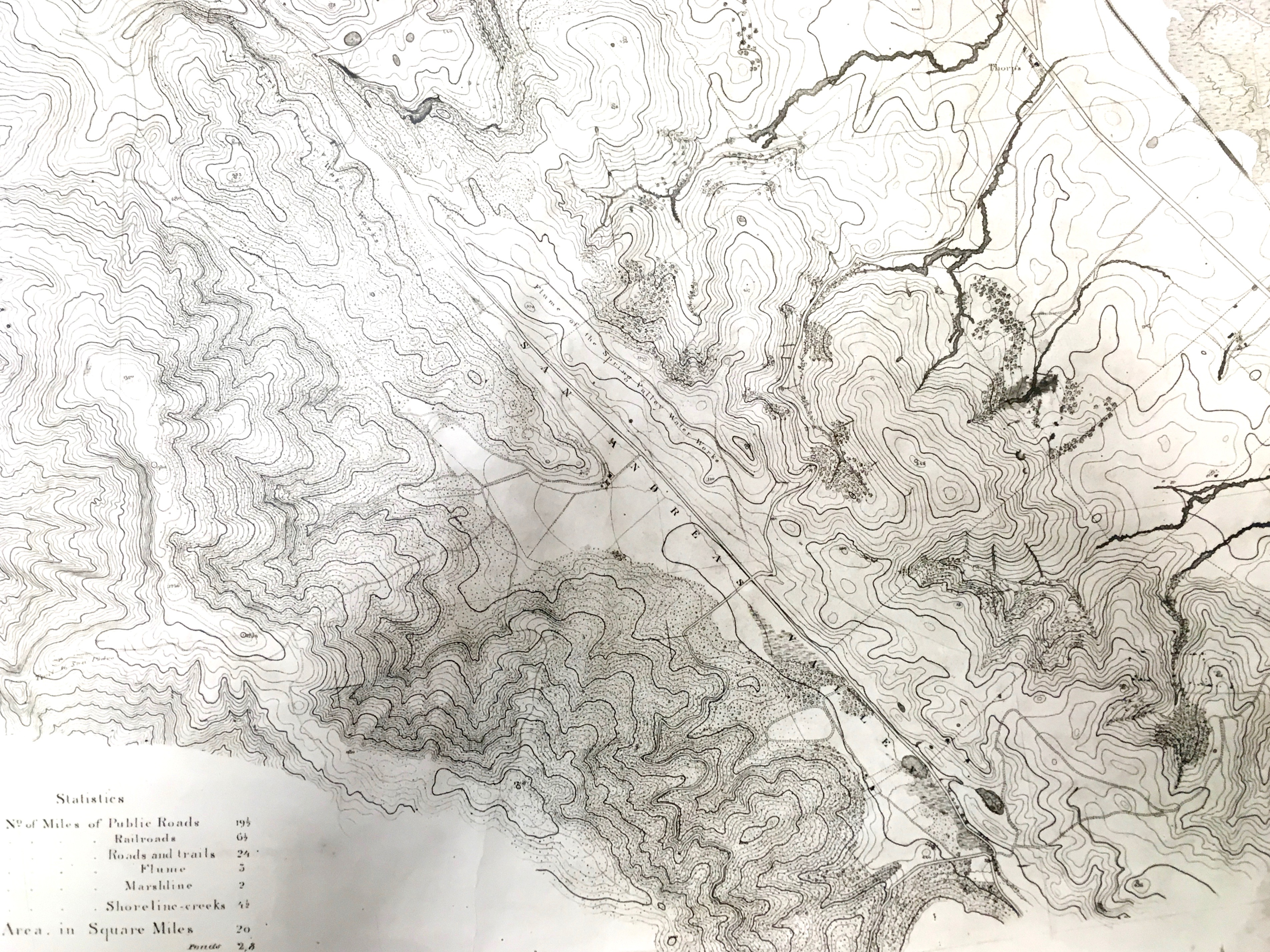
San Andreas Valley 1867

After discovering San Francisco Bay from Sweeney Ridge on November 4, 1769, the Portolà expedition descended what Portolà called the Cañada de San Francisco, now known as San Andreas Creek, to camp just south of the San Mateo Creek canyon on a lake called by him Laguna Grande, now covered by Upper Crystal Springs Reservoir. The campsite is marked by California Historical Marker No. 94 "Portola Expedition Camp". After heading south and descending from the foothills along San Francisquito Creek to established his base camp at El Palo Alto, Portola retraced his steps and returned along San Andreas Creek to recross Sweeney Ridge and then via the coast back to San Diego. The San Andres Creek place name is shown on the Rancho de las Pulgas 1856 plat map. Padre Palóu, on an expedition from Monterey to explore the western side of San Francisco Bay led by Captain Rivera, renamed Portola's Cañada de San Francisco to Cañada de San Andrés on November 30, 1774, it being the feast day of St. Andrew. Captain Juan Bautista de Anza, after forging the first overland route from Monterey, California, to San Francisco Bay, explored the peninsula and selected the sites for the Mission San Francisco de Asís (Mission Dolores) and the Presidio of San Francisco. De Anza returned to Monterey via the Cañada de San Andrés and camped on the banks of San Mateo Creek on March 29, 1776. In de Anza's diary on March 29, 1776, he wrote: "Night having fallen, at a quarter past six I went down to the arroyo of San Andreas and to another, that of San Matheo, where it descends to empty into the estuary."

The two Crystal Springs lakes and San Andreas Lake used to be known as Spring Valley Lakes for the Spring Valley Water Company which owned them. The Spring Valley Water Company named the lakes, the Spring Valley Lakes, after the company. The original Spring Valley was between Mason and Taylor Streets, and Washington and Broadway Streets in San Francisco, where the water company started. When the company went south for more water, the Spring Valley name was carried south too.

== Watershed ==
San Andreas Creek's source elevation is at approximately 900 feet (270 m) on the eastern slopes of Sweeney Ridge from which it flows southeasterly along the San Andreas Rift between Sweeney Ridge to the west and Buri Buri Ridge to the east, through San Andreas Reservoir, which was formed by the construction of a 100-foot-high (30 m) earth dam in 1868. The San Andreas Dam eliminates flow in the creek immediately below the dams, except for occasional spills or releases from the reservoir and seepage through the dam. From San Andreas Reservoir, the creek descends and enters the northeast arm of Lower Crystal Springs Reservoir. Historically San Andreas Creek joined San Mateo Creek just above the current location of the Crystal Springs Dam. The two Crystal Springs lakes and San Andreas Lake used to be known as Spring Valley Lakes for the Spring Valley Water Company, which owned them. Lower Crystal Springs Reservoir now covers the town of Crystal Springs, which grew up around a resort of the same name.

== Ecology ==
=== Ecological history ===
Before European settlers arrived, much of the San Andreas Valley portion of the watershed was composed of wetlands. Wetlands are habitats that are a combination water-submerged land, and land that floats above the water. They have several different categories, which are distinguished by the type of water (freshwater, saltwater, etc.) and the type of land (marshes, mangroves, etc.). San Andreas Creek was lined with several, relatively small sag ponds, which are bodies of water formed by fault line movements that create basins where freshwater can collect. These aquatic habitats allowed riparian (referring to the banks of bodies of water) wildlife to thrive. However, the arrival of colonizers between the late 18th and mid 20th centuries led to a string of impactful environmental and ecological changes to San Andreas Creek and the rest of the watershed. For instance, several dams were built, including the San Andreas Dam, and the Upper and Lower Crystal Springs Dams. These dams completely deluged the naturally existing aquatic habitats, including the riparian ones, desiccating much of the wildlife. However, for a period of time before the 20th century, the existing grassland habitats seemed to increase, while shrubland area decreased, as a result of the farming practices introduced by the Spanish, and the forced termination of Indigenous burning practices. However, modern American influences from the mid 20th century onwards have decreased the grassland area by about 70%, and this destruction was accelerated by highway construction and residential development. These haven't been the only habitats to face destruction around the San Andreas creek and the surrounding area; furthermore, other environmental damages, such as Sudden Oak Death and the spread of plant pathogens, have exacerbate as a result of various human-created developments. In response, there have been efforts to restore several original habitats, including wetlands, grasslands, and others.

=== Fog drip ===
Fog drip may play a key role in the precipitation in the upper watershed. On Cahill Ridge (just west of San Mateo Creek and east of Pilarcitos Creek, at an elevation of 1,000 feet (300 m), Oberlander measured fog drip beneath tanoak (Lithocarpus densiflorus), Coast redwood and three Douglas fir trees, the latter 125 feet (38 m) tall. He found that the trees most exposed produced the most precipitation and in five weeks of measurement (July 20 – August 28, 1951) fog drip below the tanoak produced 59 inches (1,500 mm) of precipitation, more than the total annual precipitation on nearby grasslands and chaparral. The Douglas fir produced 7 to 17 inches (180 to 430 mm) of fog drip and appeared to provide unique conditions supporting the orchids giant helleborine (Epipactis gigantea) and phantom orchid (Cephalanthera austiniae), since these plants were found exclusively in these moist ridge tops.

== See also ==
- List of watercourses in the San Francisco Bay Area
- San Andreas Reservoir
- San Mateo Creek
