= Sweeney Ridge =

Coastal hiking area in San Mateo County, California

Coordinates: 37.608°N 122.457°W

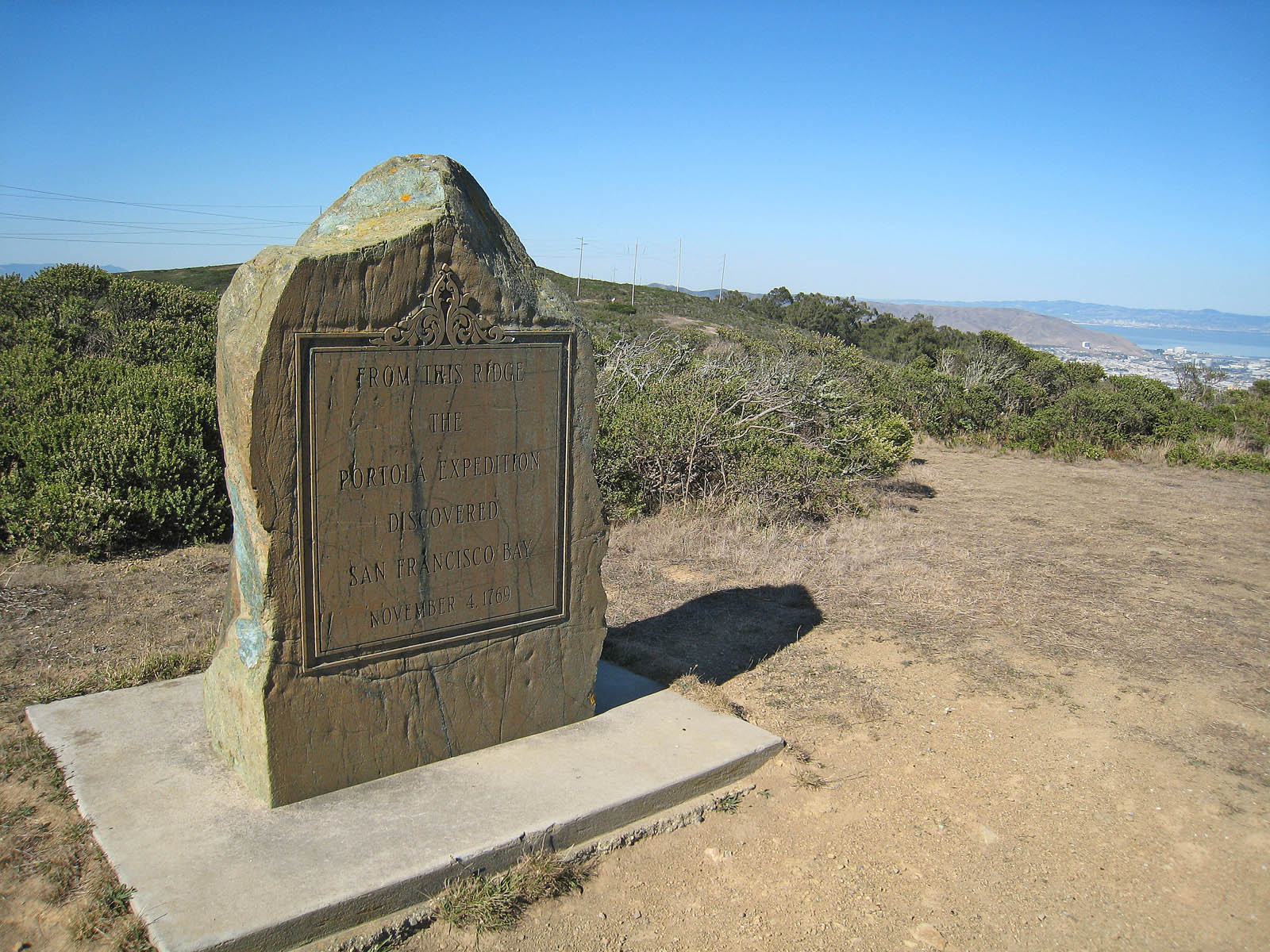
Marker commemorating the Portolá expedition's sighting

Sweeney Ridge, is a 1,200-acre (5 km^{2}) hilly hiking area of ridges and ravines between San Bruno and Pacifica, California, about a 25-minute drive south from San Francisco. The ridge's 1,200-foot-high summit, covered with coastal scrub and grassland, slopes down to San Francisco Bay on the east and to the Pacific Ocean on the west. The ridge is part of the Golden Gate National Recreation Area. Historically, the ridge is the location of the San Francisco Bay Discovery Site, commemorating the Portolá expedition's first sighting of San Francisco Bay on November 4, 1769 (expedition scouts actually made the discovery a few days earlier).

== Description ==
Hiking trail access to Sweeney Ridge is available, on the Pacifica side, from the Shelldance Nursery site (Mori Ridge trail), and from the east end of Fassler Avenue (Baquiano Trail). On the San Bruno side, access the area from parking lots #2 and #4 at Skyline College (Sweeney Ridge Trail), and via a paved trail from the end of Sneath Lane in San Bruno (bikes OK).

Ecologically, Sweeney Ridge is an example of Northern coastal scrub habitat, the landscape dominated by coyote bush, yellow bush lupine, and California Yerba Santa—in some places up to 6 to 8 feet high. Access from Sneath Lane provides a 2-mile walk up a fenced hardtop road through this shrubby habitat. The ridgetop itself has quite a bit of California coastal prairie, mostly native grasses with patches of Douglas iris. The ridgetop is also considered one of the best Bay Area lookouts for spring northbound raptor migration, based on studies by the Golden Gate Raptor Observatory.

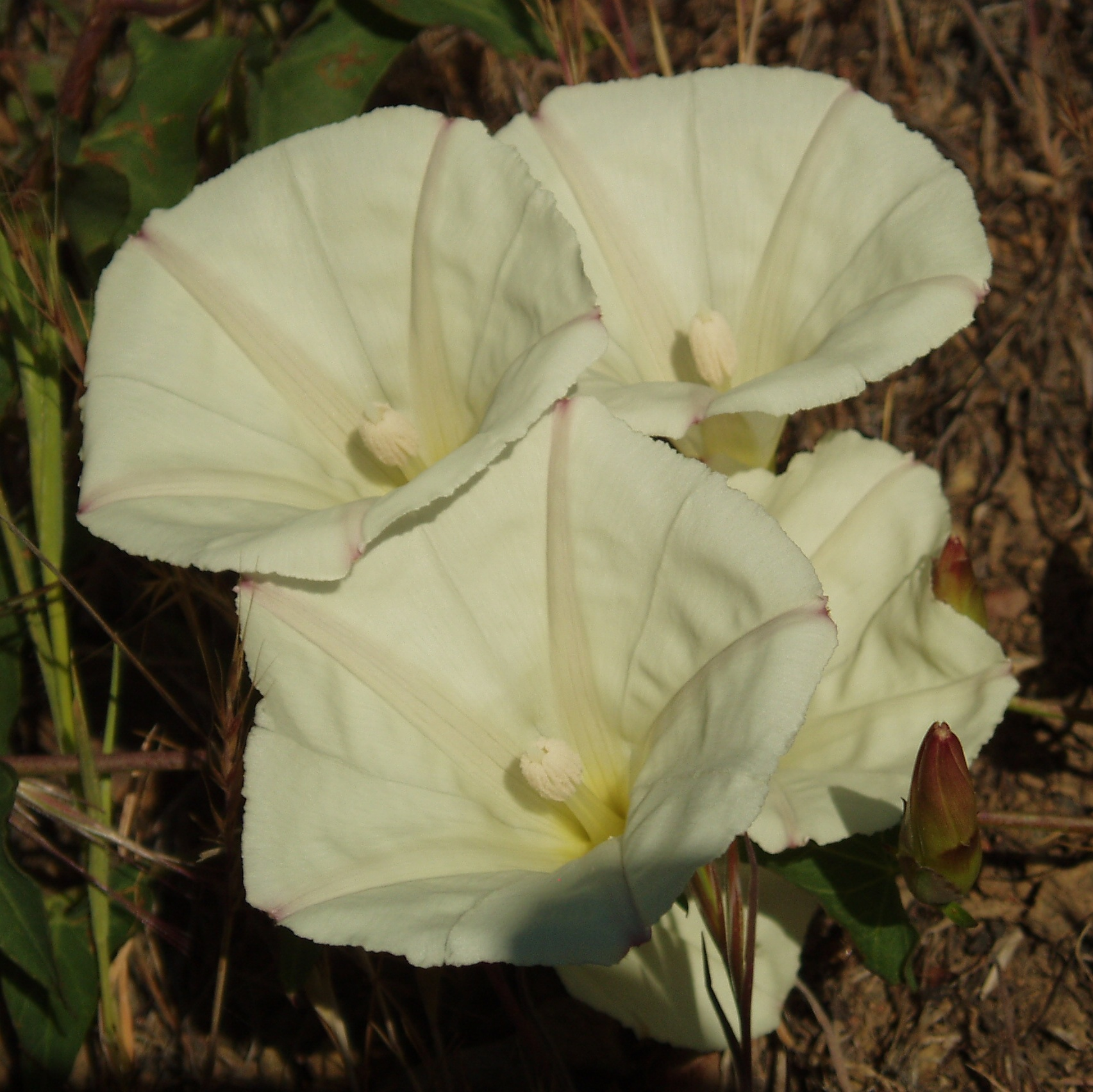
Calystegia occidentalis

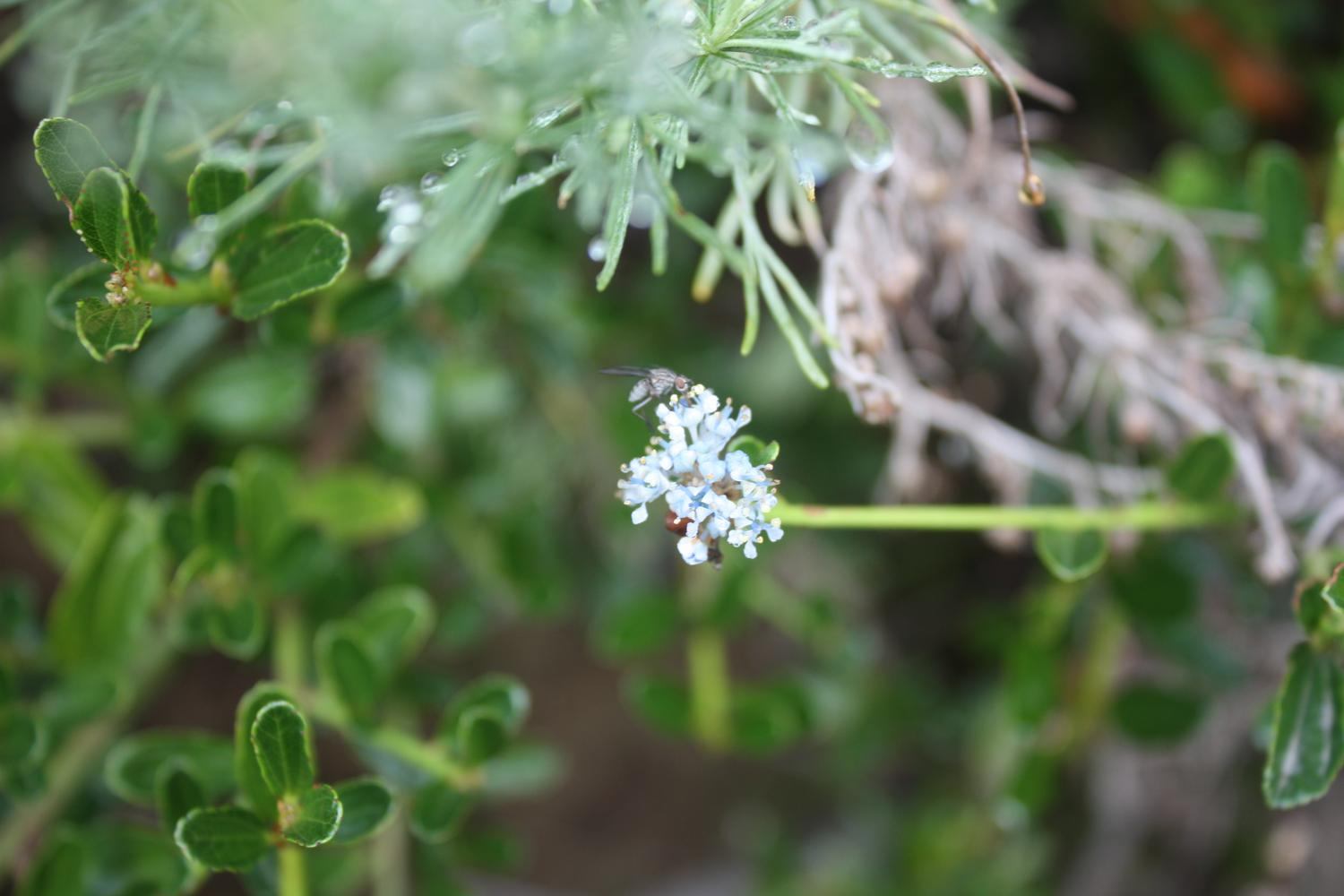
Ceanothus thyrsiflorus

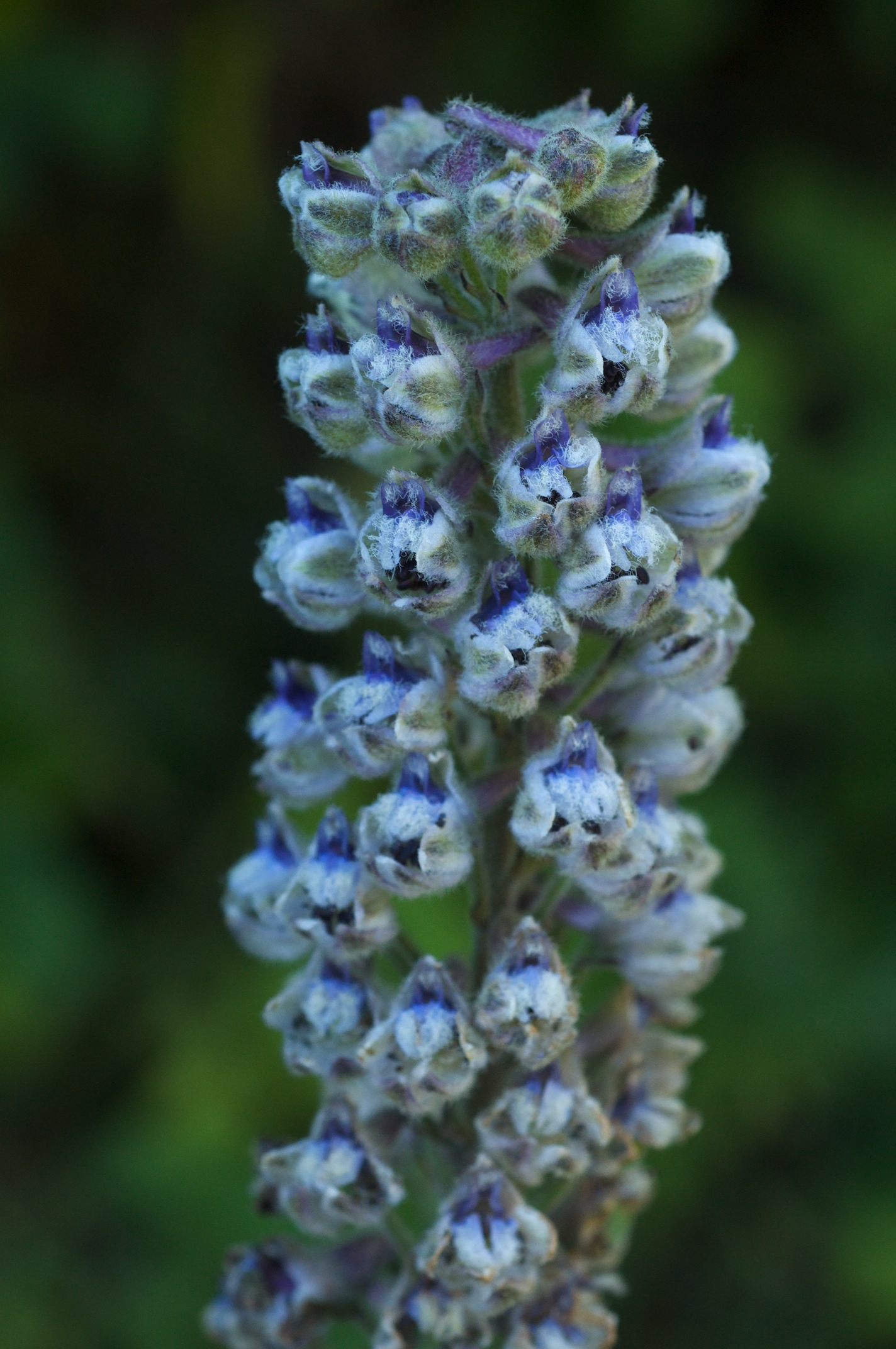
Delphinium californicum ssp. californicum.

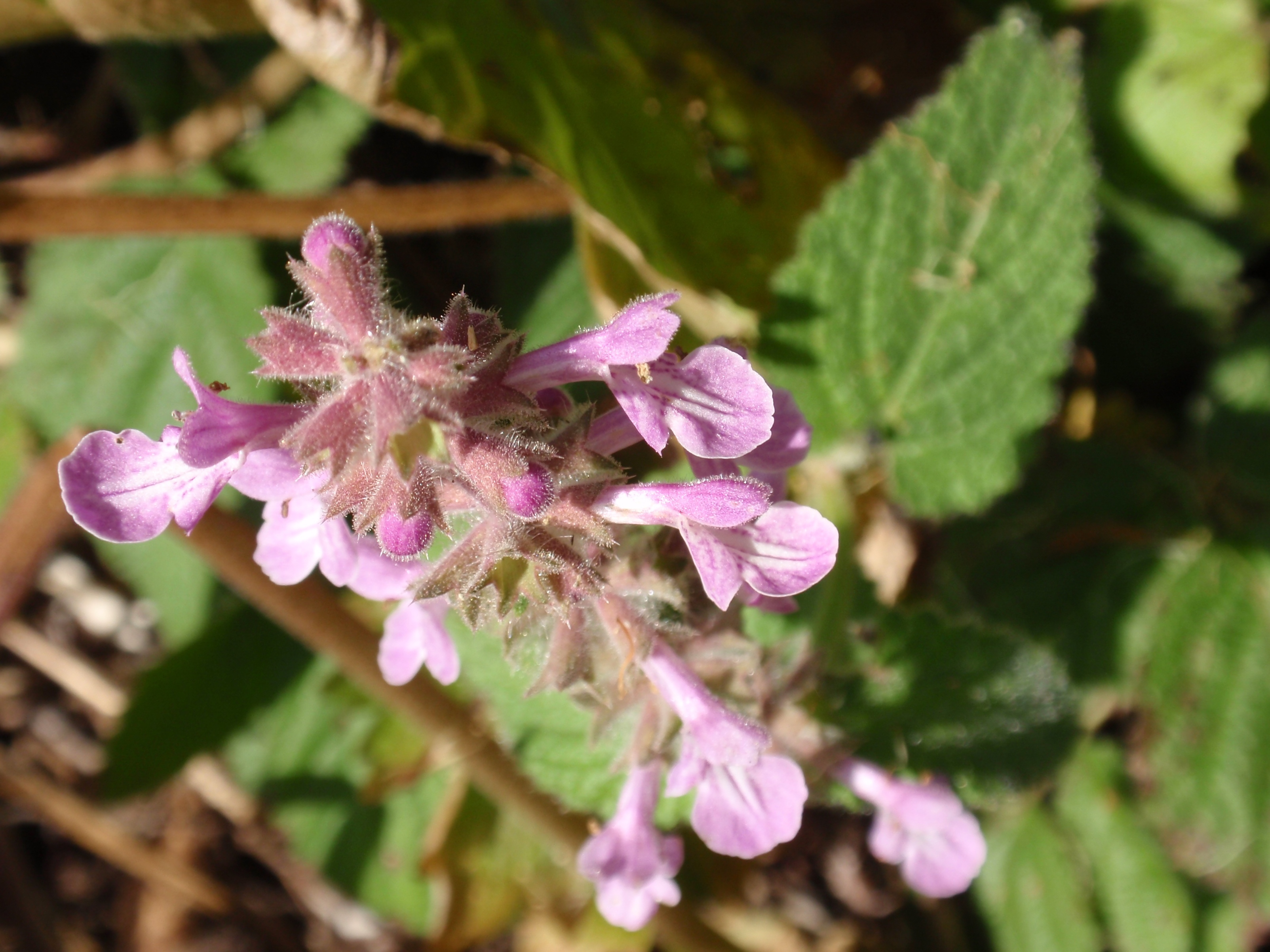
Stachys bullata

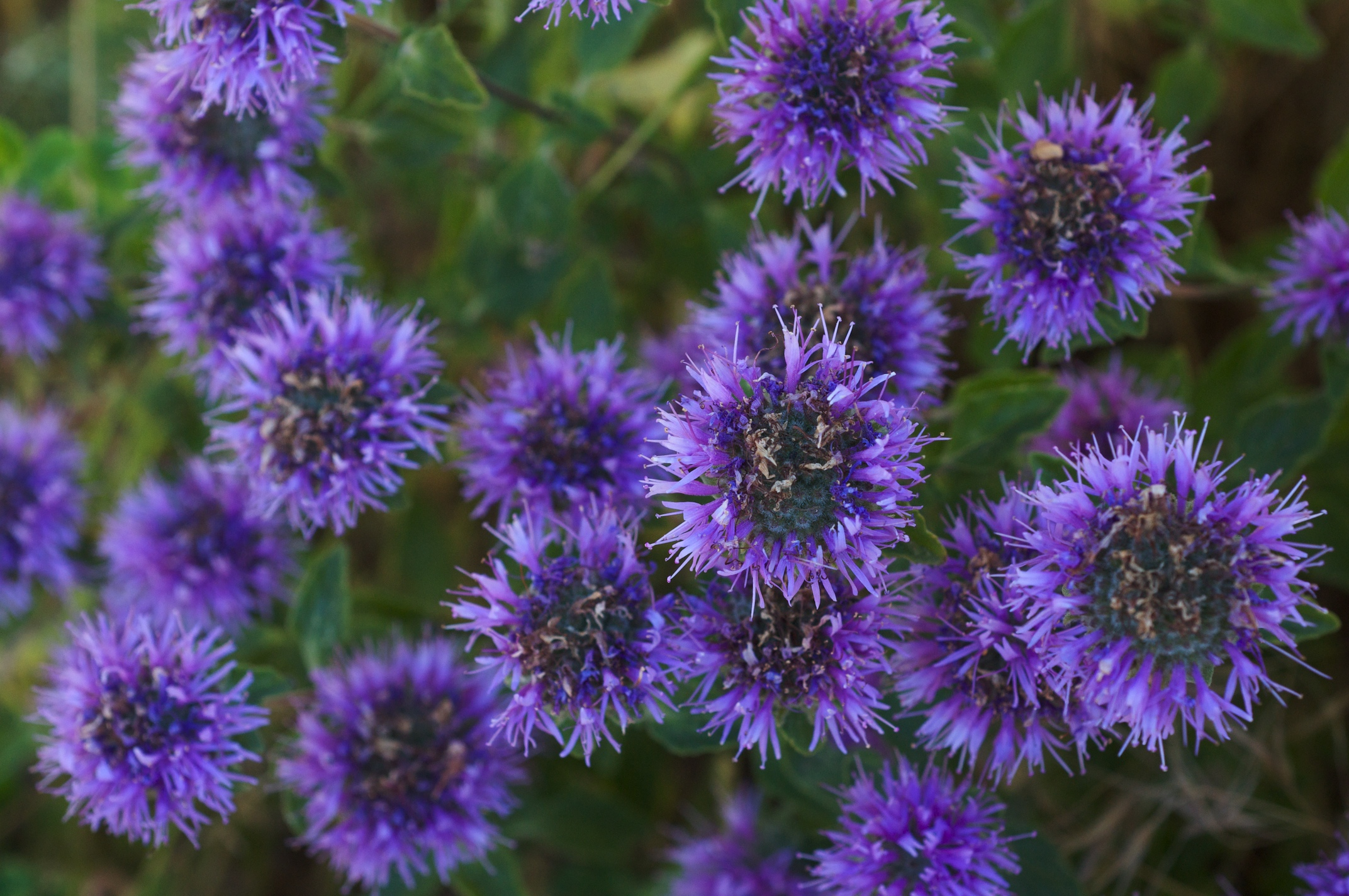
Monardella villosa ssp. franciscana

The ridge trail leads to a series of abandoned buildings that were formerly the site of the SF-51C Nike missile control facility.

== Fauna ==
Wildlife at Sweeney Ridge includes hawks, deer, coyote, cougar, and a plethora of both native and introduced spring wildflowers.

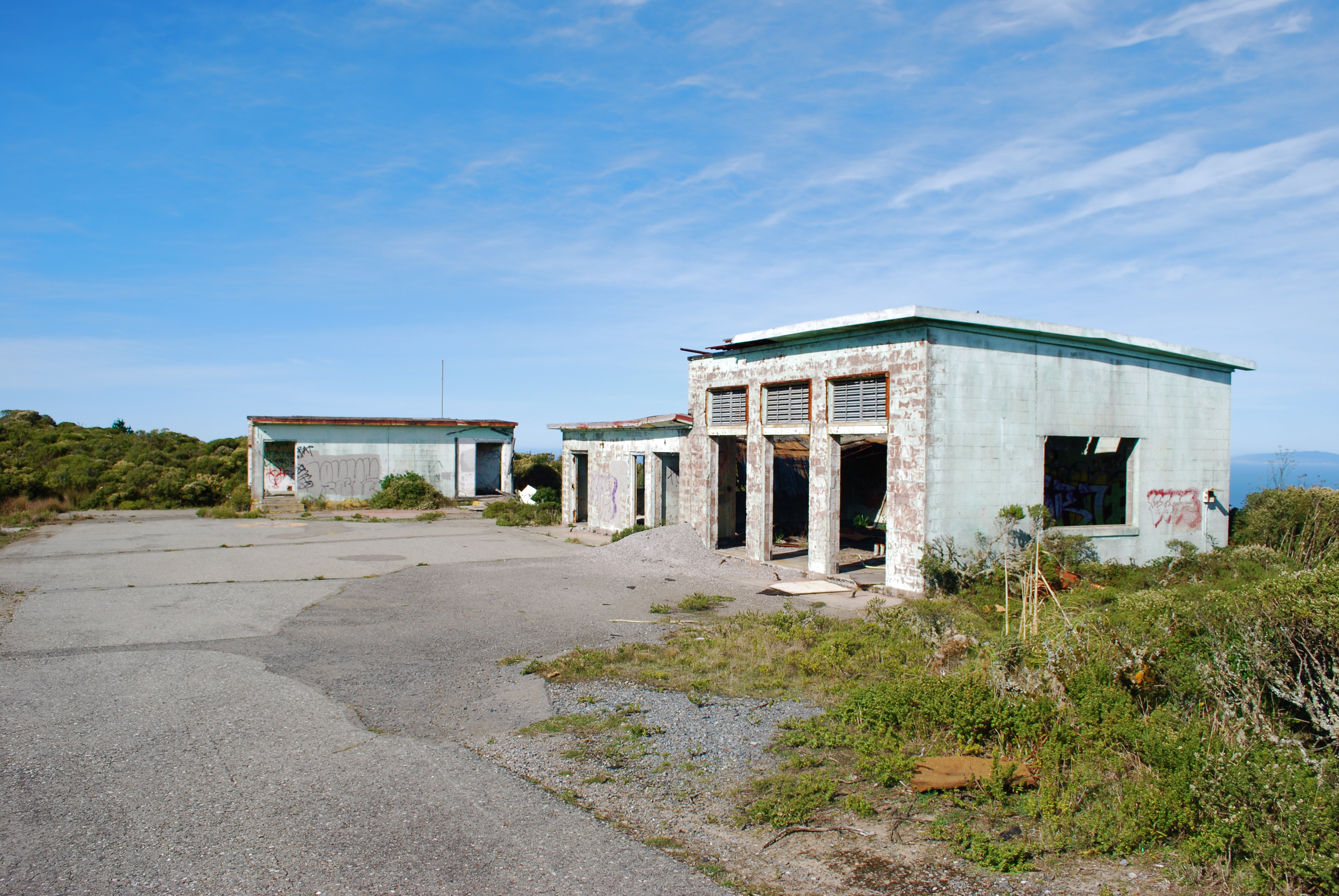
SF-51C Nike missile control facility

== Gallery ==
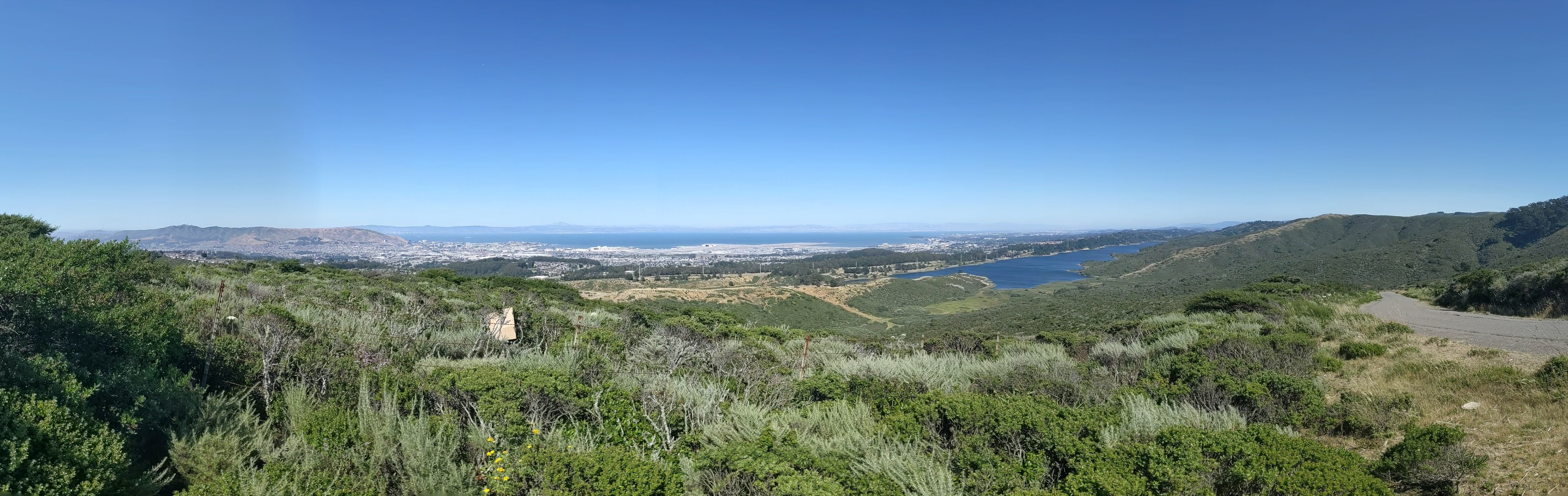
A panorama from near the summit of Sweeney Ridge trail
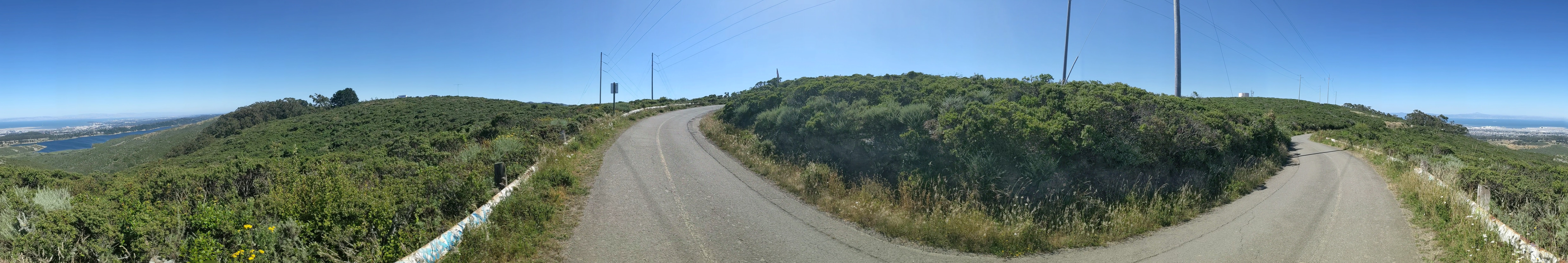
A panorama from partway up Sweeney Ridge trail
