= University Club of San Francisco =

Members-only group meeting at Nob Hill

The University Club of San Francisco
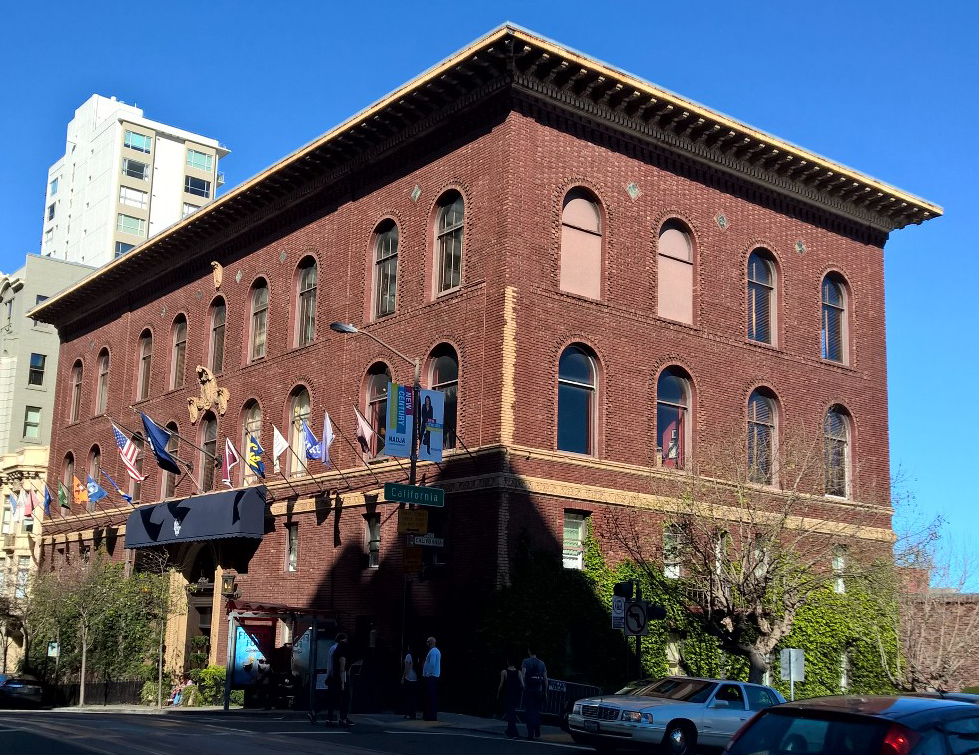
- Formation: 1890; 136 years ago
- Founder: William Thomas
- Founded at: 722 Sutter Street
- Type: Private Social Club (IRC 501(c)7)
- Headquarters: 800 Powell Street, San Francisco, California
- Coordinates: 37.79236°N 122.40904°W
- Members: 500 maximum
- Affiliations: International Associate Clubs
- Website: www.uclubsf.org

The University Club of San Francisco is a private social club located atop Nob Hill in San Francisco, California. Notable members have included President Herbert Hoover and conservationist John Muir.

== History ==
The University Club of San Francisco was founded in 1890 by William Thomas, an alumnus of Harvard University (class of 1873) and the President of the Harvard Club of San Francisco. Thomas wanted a club that would accept alumni of more universities than just Harvard, including other Ivy League schools and West Coast schools like Stanford University and the University of California, Berkeley.

Its first clubhouse was located in a two-story Victorian manse at 722 Sutter Street near Taylor Street, in the Union Square district and just around the corner from the Bohemian Club and the Olympic Club. Like most clubs of its time, membership was limited to men, and any proposed member had to have completed at least two years at university, which was somewhat uncommon at the time. The facility included a private dining room, a forum for after-dinner speakers, and guestrooms.

The Club quickly outgrew the Sutter Street building and, in 1903, Club President William Bowers Bourn II hired architect Willis Polk to design a new clubhouse at the corner of Sutter and Van Ness Streets. Before the plans could be developed or the site purchased, however, the Sutter Street clubhouse was destroyed by fire in the 1906 San Francisco earthquake. For the next two years, the Club rented and occupied temporary locations.

In 1908, the Club purchased a lot atop Nob Hill at what is now 800 Powell Street, on the northeast corner of California Street, across from the Fairmont Hotel at the intersection of the two lines of the San Francisco cable car system. It previously had been the location of the mansion of Leland Stanford, which also had been destroyed in the earthquake. There, the Club built a new four-story brick Italianate-style clubhouse, designed by the local firm of Bliss & Faville, who also designed the Westin St. Francis Hotel, the Southern Pacific Building, and portions of the 1915 Panama–Pacific International Exposition. The new clubhouse devoted the second floor, and part of the first, to guestrooms. The third floor contained a restaurant and bar, and the fourth floor contained a bar, library and other rooms. The Club also obtained the site of Stanford's former stables, situated just east of the Clubhouse. There, in the early 1970s, it constructed its athletic facilities, including singles and doubles squash courts.

In 1988, under pressure from anti-discrimination lawsuits and judicial trends, the University Club agreed to accept women as members.

== The Club today ==
Membership at the University Club of San Francisco is open to individuals who meet the Club’s membership criteria and is limited to no more than 500 members, as stipulated by its by-laws. Membership is available through an application process and is subject to approval by the Club’s governing board. The Club has reciprocal membership privileges with over 400 clubs worldwide.

== Notable members ==
- William Bowers Bourn II
- Luther Burbank
- Peter Folger
- Herbert Hoover
- David Starr Jordan
- William Keith
- John Muir
- Michael O'Shaughnessy
- James D. Phelan
- Benjamin Ide Wheeler

== See also ==
- List of traditional gentlemen's clubs in the United States
