= Irvine-Byrne Building =

Historic building in Los Angeles, California, United States

- U.S. Historic district – Contributing property
- Los Angeles Historic-Cultural Monument
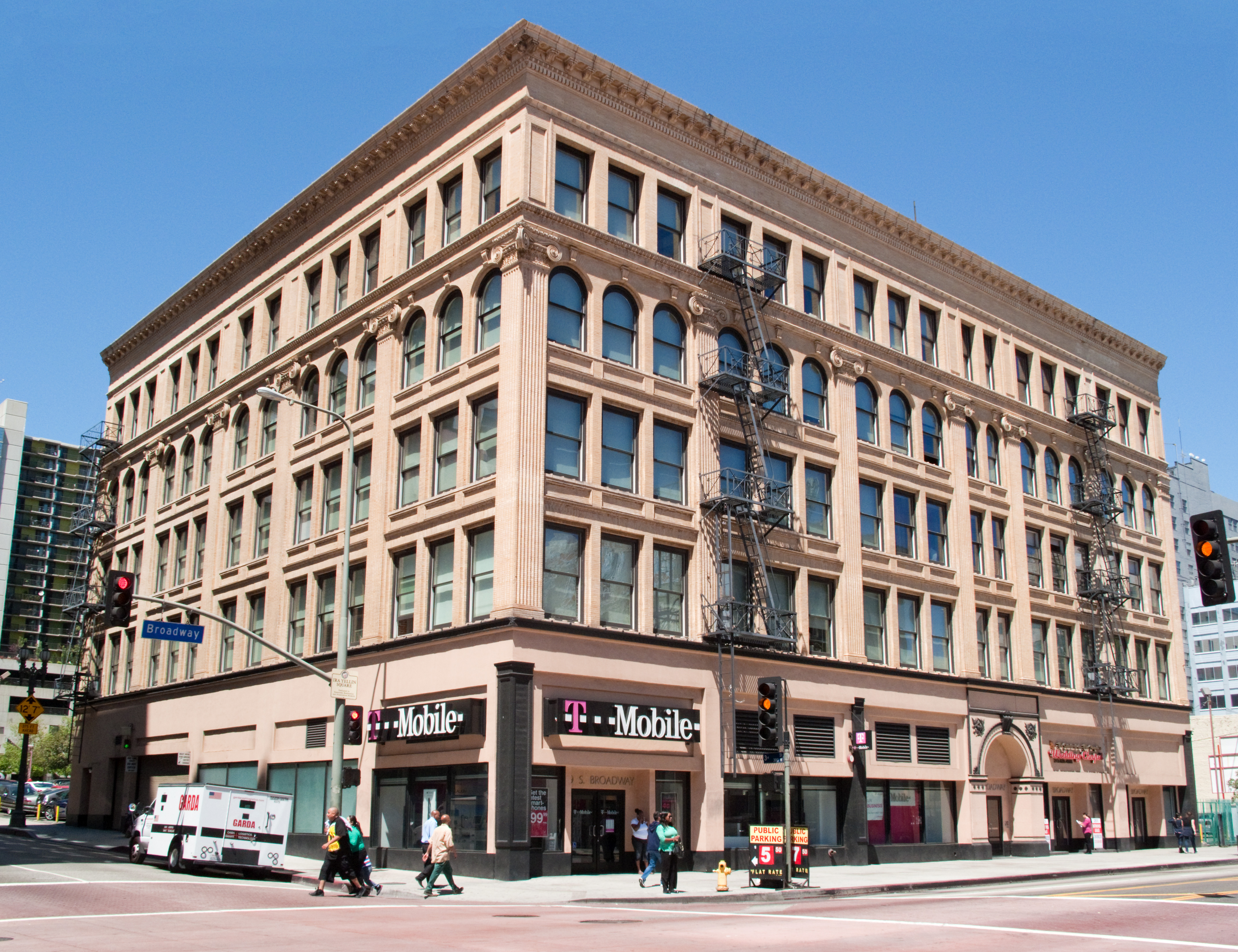
- The building in 2013

- Location within the Los Angeles metropolitan area
- Location: 249-259 South Broadway, Los Angeles
- Coordinates: 34°03′05″N 118°14′53″W
- Built: 1894
- Architect: Sumner Hunt; Willis Polk (1911 repairs)
- Architectural style: Classical Revival / Beaux Arts
- Part of: Broadway Theater and Commercial District (ID02000330)
- LAHCM No.: 544

Significant dates
- Designated CP: April 12, 2002
- Designated LAHCM: August 2, 1991

Irvine-Byrne Building, also known as Irvine Block, Byrne Building, Giant Penny Building, Pan American Building, and Pan American Lofts, is a historic five-story building located at 249-259 South Broadway, on the corner of Broadway and 3rd Street, in the Broadway Theater District in the historic core of downtown Los Angeles. It is the second-oldest commercial building in the historic core, after the Bradbury Building located at the same intersection and designed and built by the same individuals.

== History ==
Irvine-Byrne Building, originally called Irvine Block, was designed by Sumner Hunt and built for Margaret Irvine of Irvine Ranch in 1894, with construction supervised by George Wyman. James W. Byrne, who had offices in the building since at least 1896, purchased the building in 1905 and subsequently changed its name to Byrne Building. Additional building tenants during its early years include McCormick-Henderson Company, Fireman's Fund Insurance Company, Mount Lowe Springs Company, I. Magnin, at least one dentist, at least one real-estate agent, and numerous lawyers and architects. The Mexican Consulate in Los Angeles was also located in this building during World War II.

The building caught fire on February 16, 1911, after which Willis Polk led repairs and alterations.

Irvine-Byrne Building was not listed in the National Register of Historic Places's Broadway Theater and Commercial District when it was first created in 1979, but it was included when the district was expanded in 2002. The building was also listed as Los Angeles Historic-Cultural Monument No. 544 in 1991.

The building's ground-floor housed a Giant Penny discount store from the 1980s to 2004, after which the building underwent a $20 million ($34.1 million in 2025) conversion to residential. Donald Barany Architects supervised the remodel, paid for by Urban Pacific Builders.

== Architecture and design ==
Irvine-Byrne Building is built of brick, decorated with terra cotta, and features a three-tiered Classical Revival/Beaux Arts design. Elements of the design in the building include:

- an entrance offset to the north on the eastern end of the building, distinguished by a keystone arch, above which "Pan American Building" is written in raised letters
- second through fourth floor bays faced with buff brick and defined by Ionic pilasters
- three and two-window baus on the second-through-fifth floors of east and south exteriors
- paneled spandrels and soldier brick lintels that mark the second and third story windows
- arch-topped fourth floor windows punctuated with keystones
- a plain string course and an egg and dart molding above the fourth floor arches and Ionic capitals
- paneled pilasters between bays on the fifth floor
- a denticulated and bracketed cornice along with decorative moldings edged by a plain frieze that cap the south and east exteriors
- an interior courtyard circled by the building's upper levels.

The condition and integrity of the building are both considered good.

== Filming location ==
Numerous films and television commercials have shot in the Irvine-Byrne Building, most notably Seven.

== See also ==
- List of contributing properties in the Broadway Theater and Commercial District
- List of Los Angeles Historic-Cultural Monuments in Downtown Los Angeles
