= William Bowers Bourn II =

American entrepreneur

- Bourn II (1917) during construction of Filoli
- Born: May 31, 1857; San Francisco, California, U.S.
- Died: July 5, 1936 (aged 79); Woodside, California, U.S.
- Education: Sidney Sussex College, Cambridge
- Occupation: Energy utilities entrepreneur
- Known for: Socialite, Entrepreneur
- Spouse: Agnes Moody (1881–1936, death)
- Children: 2

William Bowers Bourn II (31 May 1857 – 5 July 1936) was an American entrepreneur and socialite. Bourn ran and controlled the Empire Mine and the San Francisco Gas Company, he was an investor in Spring Valley Water Company, and he led a merger to what later became Pacific Gas and Electric Company. Bourn II was the builder of many estates in California, including Filoli, the country estate in San Mateo County, California.

== Biography ==
Bourn was born in San Francisco, California, on 31 May 1857, the second child of mining entrepreneur William Bowers Bourn and Sarah Esther Chase. He was educated at Union College, St. Augustine's College, an Episcopal missionary college in Benicia, and the University School in San Francisco. While attending the University School in San Francisco, 17 year old Bourn lived full-time with his father and his 21 year old cousin Willis Ingalls visiting from the East Coast. The two boys were trained to work alongside Bourn the elder and learned about business dealings and mining. His father accidentally shot himself in the stomach in their San Francisco Nob Hill home and died in July 1874. A few months later in 1875, he left for England and a classical education at Sidney Sussex College of Cambridge University.

He returned to California in 1878 to help his mother manage the family business interests. He reorganized the Empire Mine, significantly improving operations at the mine. He opened a bank in Grass Valley and became a director of the San Francisco Gas Company. By 1887 he had sold his mining interests. In 1888 he partnered with E. Everett Wise and other investors to build the mammoth Greystone Cellars in Napa Valley. Bourn bought Wise out, but sold it entirely in 1894 in the midst of the phylloxera scourge.

Bourn reacquired control of the Empire Mine in 1896.

In the 1890s he spearheaded the merger of electricity and gas companies in San Francisco, which would later become the Pacific Gas and Electric Company, and in 1890 began significant investments in the Spring Valley Water Company, which would be bought by the city government of San Francisco in February 1929 and, with the Hetch Hetchy Reservoir expansion which Bourn had opposed, become its water supplier. Bourn was regularly pilloried by the San Francisco Chronicle as a thief and scoundrel for water rates, but Bourn replied that the company needed to earn a reasonable return on its investments and was also making provision for future population growth.

== Personal life ==
Bourn was married in 1881 to Agnes Moody. They had two children together, a son and a daughter. The first born was son William Bowers Bourn III, born in 1882 and he died one day later. Their second born was daughter Maud born in 1883. Bourn and his wife built their country estate Filoli in Woodside, California in 1915. Bourn suffered a stroke in 1922, which kept him in a wheelchair.

In 1929, his daughter Maud died from pneumonia in Manhattan, New York. By 1929, he had sold the Empire to Newmont Mining Corporation.

William Bowers Bourn II died at Filoli and was buried in the Bourn Family Cemetery with his wife and daughter on the property.

== Estates and properties ==
- Asilo (or Villa Eden Del Mar), 3270 17 Mile Drive, Pebble Beach, California. It was built in 1924 by architect George Washington Smith in a Spanish Revival style for Bourn's daughter Maud.
- Filoli, 86 Cañada Road, Woodside, California. This was the "country house" built in 1915 on his company land, by architect Willis Polk, it's open to the public for tours as it is one of best-known examples of an American country estate.
- Muckross House, Muckross Peninsula, (now located in Killarney National Park), Killarney, County Kerry, Ireland. It was built in 1843, by Scottish architect William Burn and purchased by Bourn in 1911 as a gift for his daughter and her husband. In 1932 he made a gift of the Irish estate Muckross House, to the government of Ireland in memory of his late daughter, Maud. It was to become Ireland's largest national park, Killarney National Park.
- Empire "Cottage", (now located at Empire Mine State Historic Park), Grass Valley, California. It was commissioned in 1897, designed by architect Willis Polk.
- Bourn Mansion, 2550 Webster Street, Pacific Heights, San Francisco. It was built using clinker brick in 1896 by architect Willis Polk.
- Greystone Cellars, 2555 Main Street, St Helena, California. It was built in 1888, by architect Willis Polk.

== See also ==
- North Star Mine and Powerhouse – owned by Bourn II between 1884 and 1887
- Sunol Water Temple – a structure commissioned by Bourn II, in Sunol, California
- Pulgas Water Temple – a structure commissioned by San Francisco Water Department (under Bourn II), in Woodside, California
