= Mills Building and Tower =

Mills Building
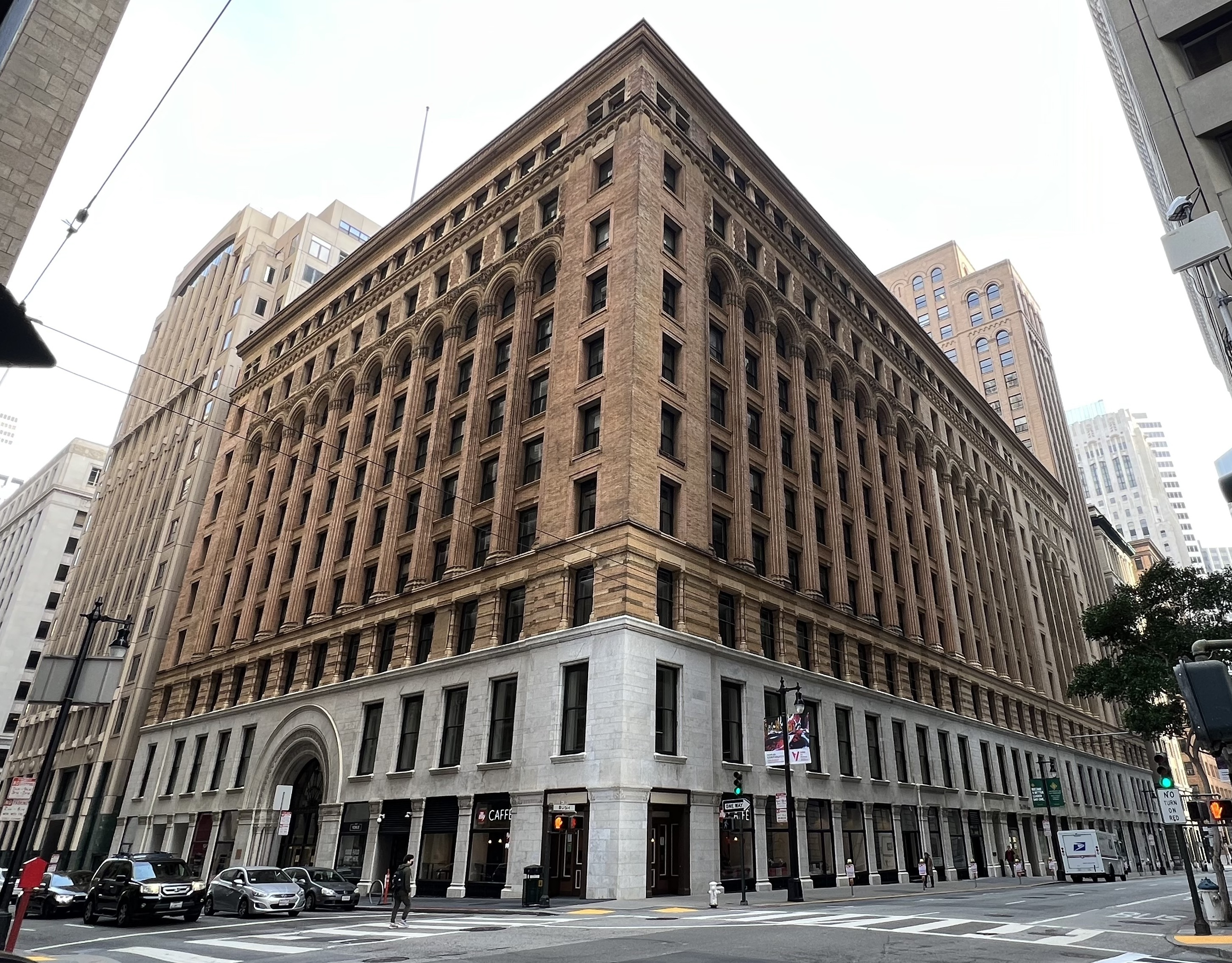
- Mills Building. Mills Tower in behind right.

- Location within San Francisco Location within California Location within the United States
- Alternative names: Mills Building and Tower; 220 Bush Street; 220 Montgomery Street

General information
- Type: Commercial offices
- Location: 220 Bush Street; 220 Montgomery Street; San Francisco, California
- Coordinates: 37.79127°N 122.40129°W
- Completed: 1892, 1931
- Owner: The Swig Company
- Operator: The Swig Company

Height
- Roof: 46.94 m (154.0 ft); 92 m (302 ft)

Technical details
- Floor count: 10 / 22

Design and construction
- Architects: Burnham & Root; D.H. Burnham & Company; Willis Polk; George W. Kelham; Lewis Parsons Hobart
- Mills Building and Tower
- U.S. National Register of Historic Places
- San Francisco Designated Landmark
- Architectural style: Chicago school
- NRHP reference No.: 77000334
- SFDL No.: 76

Significant dates
- Designated: 1977
- Designated SFDL: 1975

The Mills Building and Tower is a two-building complex following the Chicago school with Romanesque design elements in the Financial District of San Francisco, California. The structures were declared San Francisco Designated Landmark #76, and were listed on the National Register of Historic Places in 1974.

== History ==
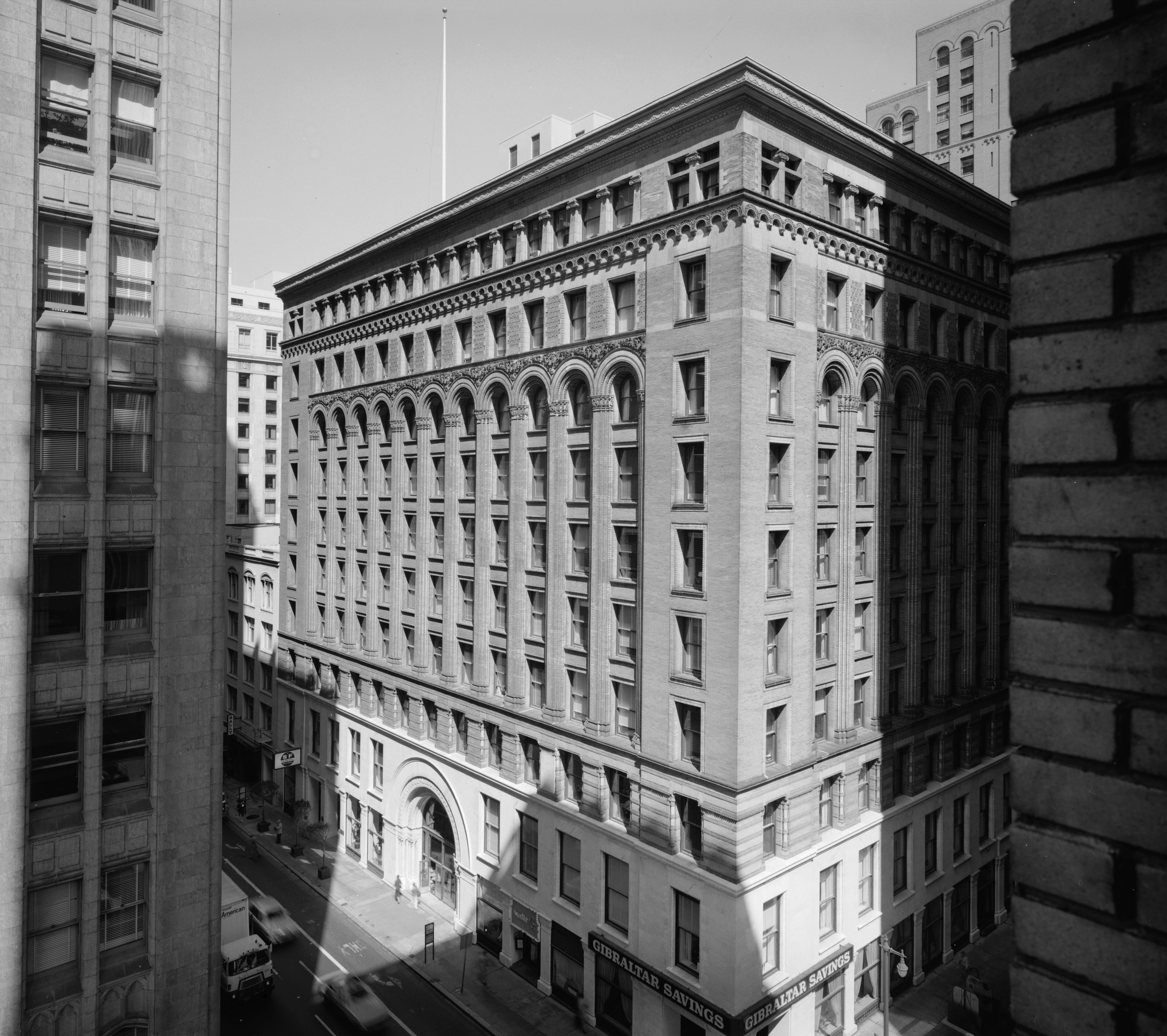
Mills Building

The original 10-story, 47 m (154 ft) structure was designed by Burnham and Root/D.H. Burnham & Company completed 1892; and after surviving the 1906 earthquake, was restored by Willis Polk in 1908, who oversaw subsequent additions in 1914 and 1918. Named for early San Francisco financial tycoon, Darius Ogden Mills, it is regarded as the city's second skyscraper, after the Chronicle Building (1890).

Completed in 1932 at 220 Bush Street, Mills Tower is a 22-story, 92 m (302 ft) annex designed by George W. Kelham and Lewis Parsons Hobart.

The Mills Building is home to several major financial firms, including SeatMe, Pocket Gems, New York Stock Exchange, and Newedge.

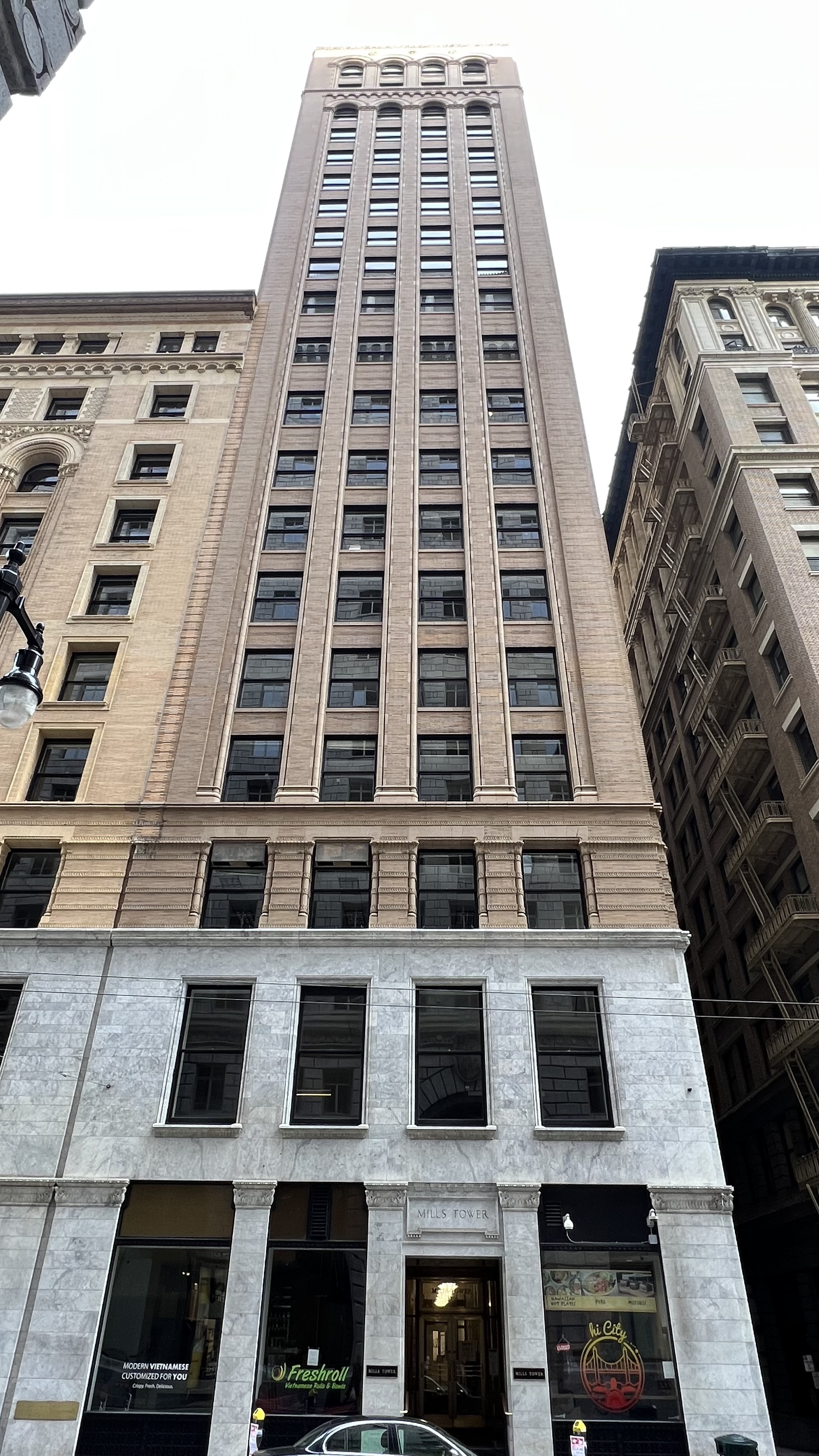
Mills Tower from the ground

== See also ==
- List of San Francisco Designated Landmarks
