= Hobart Building =

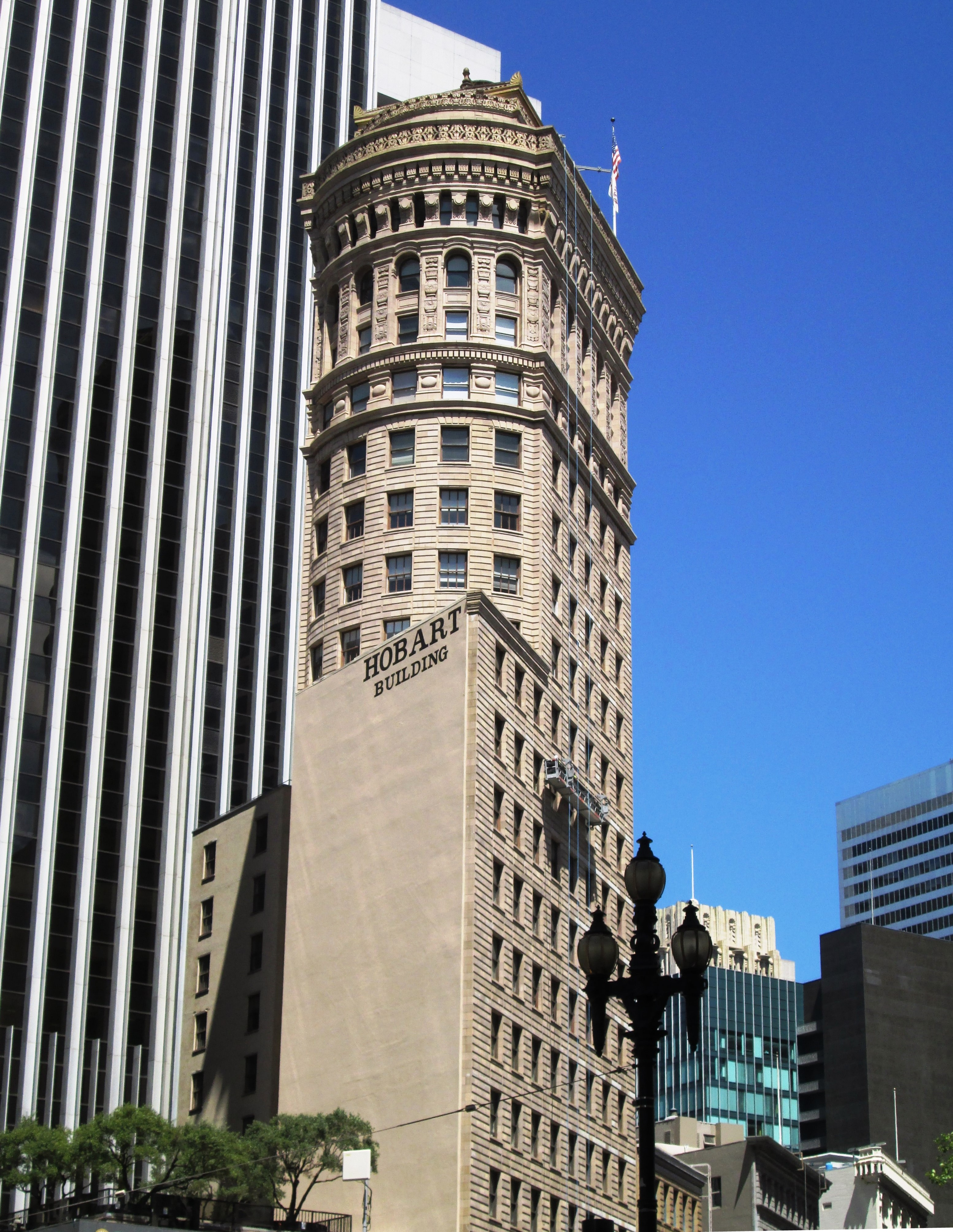
- (2017)

- Location within San Francisco County Location within California Location within the United States

General information
- Type: Commercial offices
- Location: 582–592 Market Street, San Francisco
- Coordinates: 37.7894°N 122.4016°W
- Completed: 1914

Height
- Roof: 285 ft (87 m)

Technical details
- Floor count: 21

Design and construction
- Architect: Willis Polk

San Francisco Designated Landmark
- Designated: 1983
- Reference no.: 162

The Hobart Building is an office high rise located at 582–592 Market Street, near Montgomery and 2nd Streets, in the financial district of San Francisco, California. It was completed in 1914. It was at the time the second tallest building in the city, at 21 floors and 87 m (285 ft). It was designed by Willis Polk.

The building was constructed for the Hobart Estate Company on the site of the company's previous offices. The location was reportedly chosen by founder Walter S. Hobart in the 1880s for its prominent location at the head of 2nd Street, originally one of the city's major streets leading to the fashionable Rincon Hill neighborhood. Said to be the favorite commercial building of its designer, Willis Polk, its sculpted terra cotta exterior with Baroque ornamentation and handcrafted brass and Italian marble interior are a noted example of neoclassical architecture.

Its unusual shape was dictated by the site, which is an asymmetric polygon, and since a neighboring structure was torn down in 1967, exposing one flank, it is now even more idiosyncratic and striking. The Hobart Building was designated as a landmark by the City of San Francisco in 1983, and was listed on the National Register of Historic Places in 2021.

== See also ==
- List of tallest buildings in San Francisco
- List of San Francisco Designated Landmarks

== Gallery ==
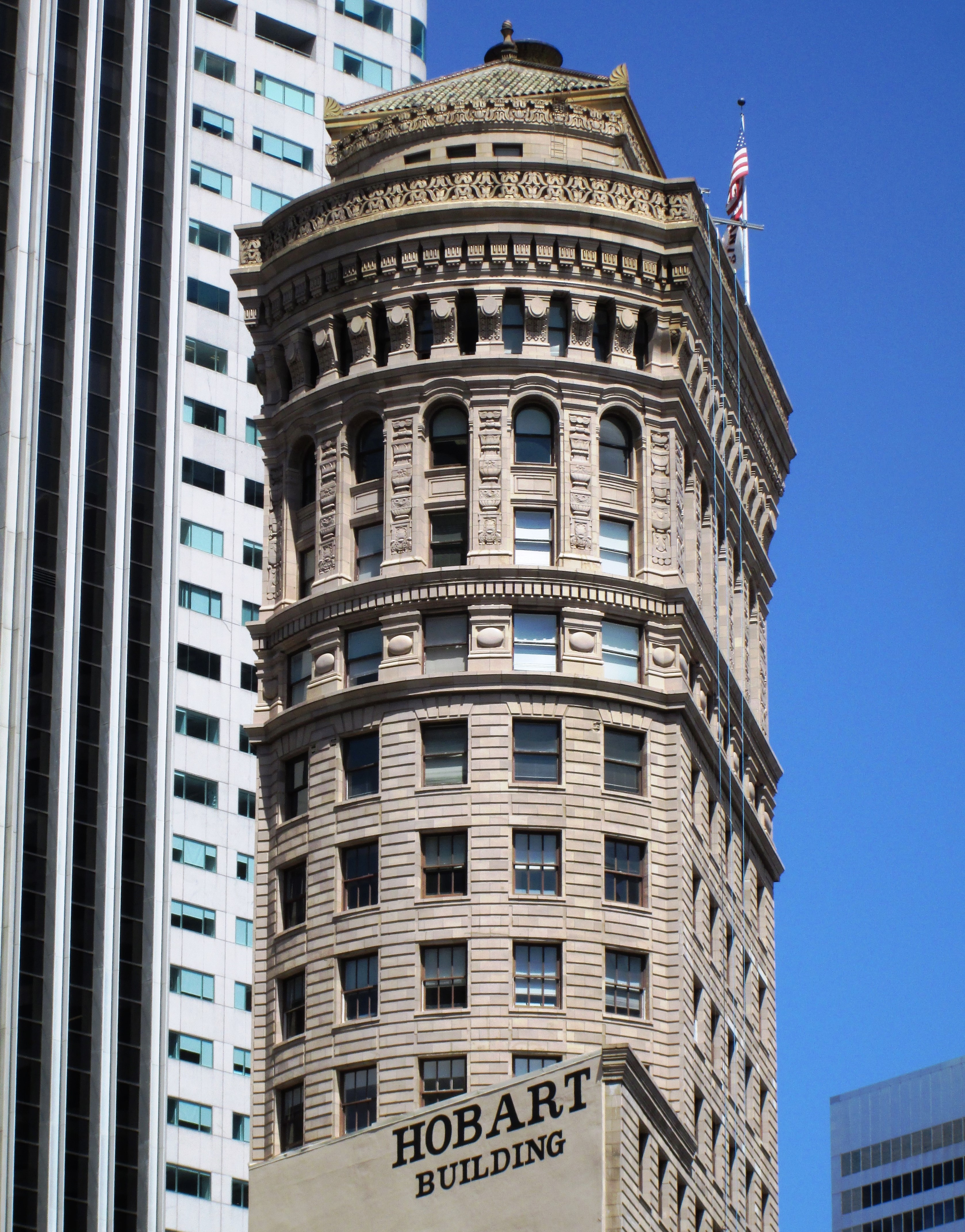
The building's top

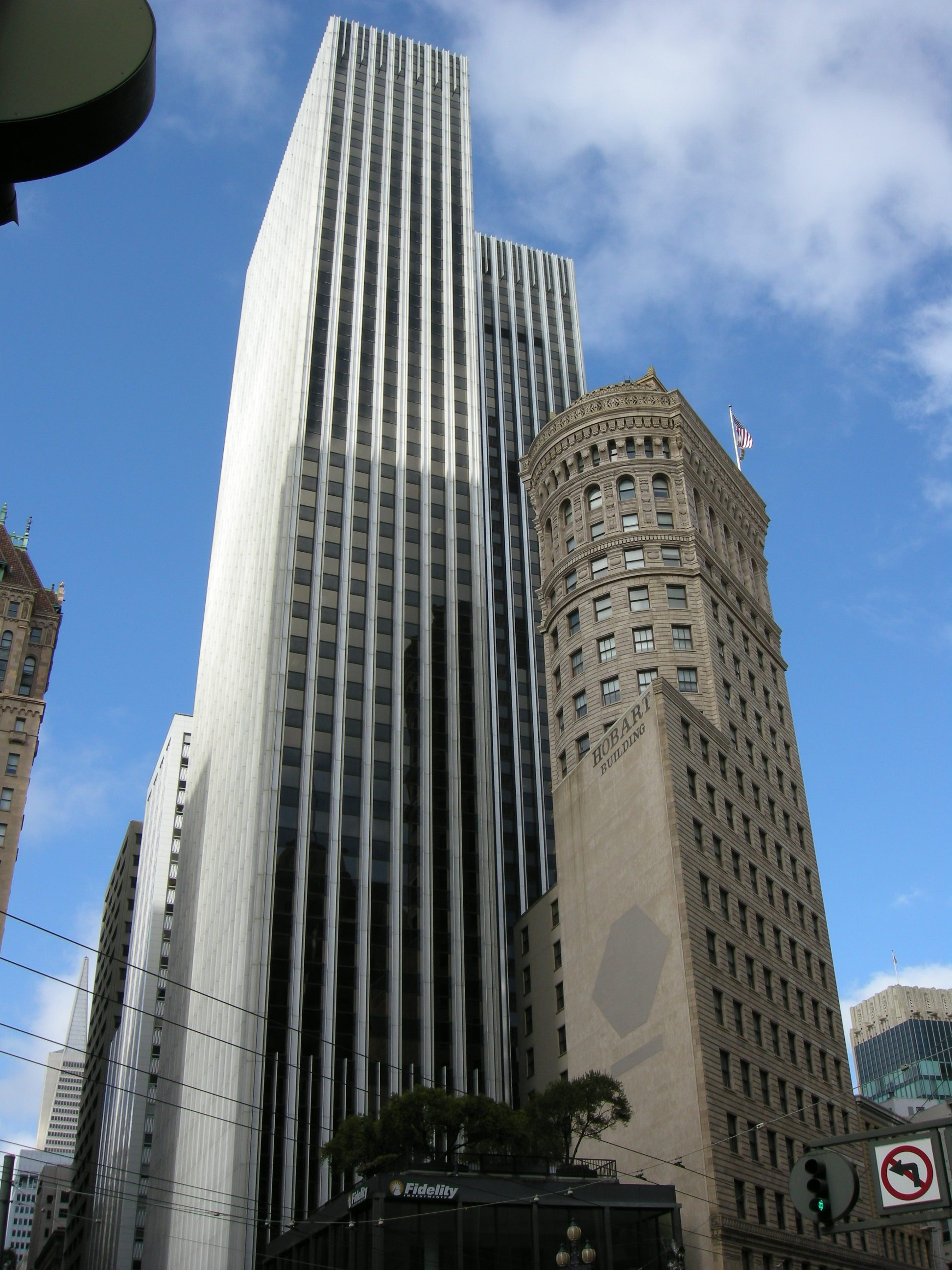
with 44 Montgomery Street

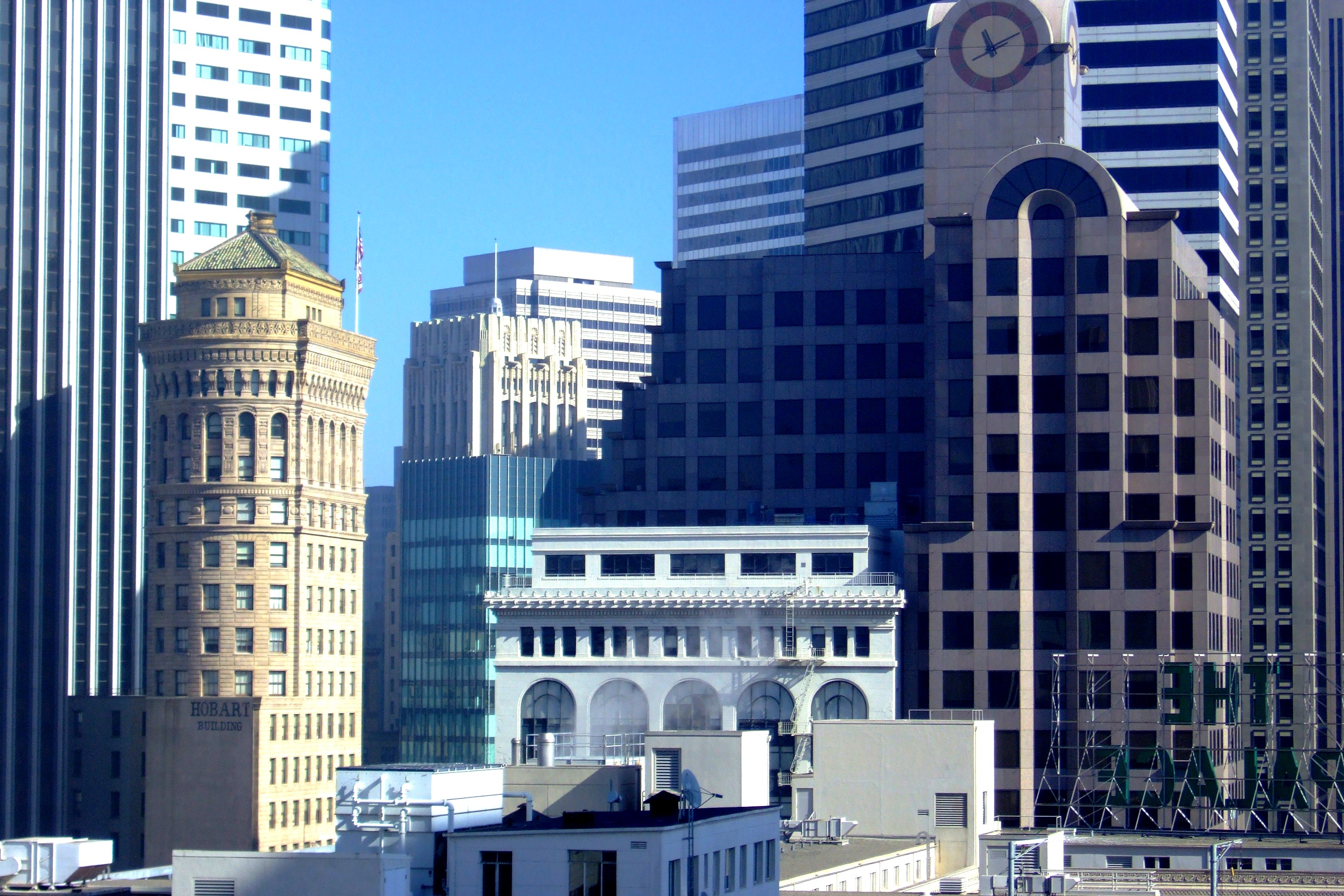
The building in its context
