= George Wyman =

American architect

George Herbert Wyman (1860 – 1939) was an American architect, best known for his involvement in construction of the Bradbury Building at 304 South Broadway in Los Angeles, California.

== Life and career ==
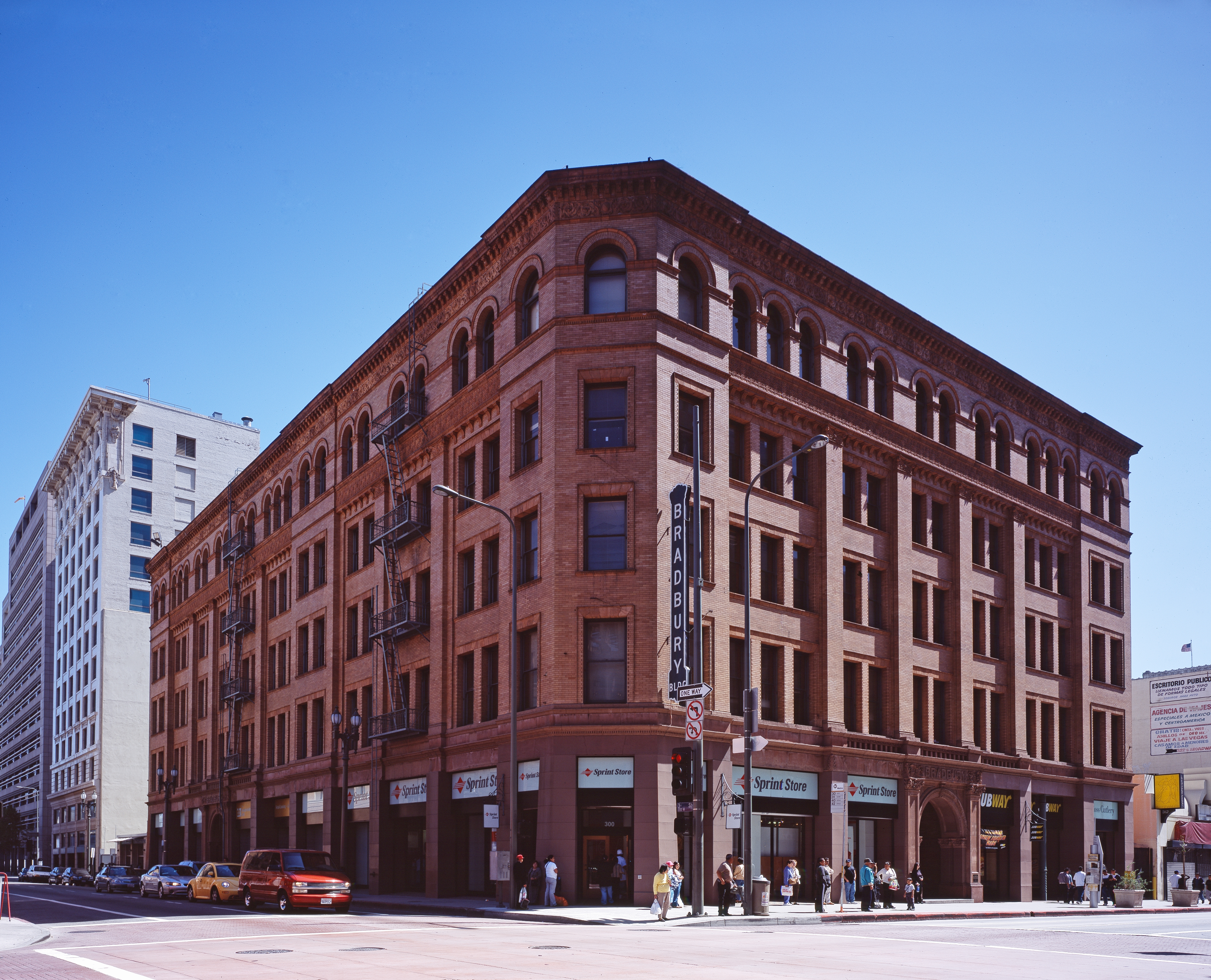
The Bradbury Building, designed by Wyman, as seen in 2005

Wyman was born in Dayton, the son of Ellen “Nellie” J. (née Rutledge) and Gustavus J. Wyman. On leaving school, he was apprenticed in the architects office of his uncle, Luthor Peters. He moved to Los Angeles in 1891 where he worked as a draughtsman in the offices of Sumner Hunt.

In 1892, Hunt was approached by the mining millionaire Lewis Bradbury to construct a landmark building for a site in downtown Los Angeles. Disappointed with Hunt's design, Bradbury took the surprising step of asking the young Wyman to design the building, despite the fact that Wyman had no formal qualifications as an architect, and had not previously designed a building. The reasons for this choice are still unclear, but it has been suggested that Bradbury was inspired by some sketches that Wyman had been working on.

Wyman had been toying with the design of a futuristic building described in Edward Bellamy's science fiction novel and social commentary, Looking Backward: From 2000-1887 (chapter 10). In the utopian society of the year 2000 the hero is taken to visit a commercial store:

It was the first interior of a twentieth-century public building that I had ever beheld, and the spectacle naturally impressed me deeply. I was in a vast hall full of light, received not alone from the windows on all sides, but from the dome, the point of which was a hundred feet above. Beneath it, in the centre of the hall, a magnificent fountain played, cooling the atmosphere to a delicious freshness with its spray. The walls and ceiling were frescoed in mellow tints, calculated to soften without absorbing the light which flooded the interior. Around the fountain was a space occupied with chairs and sofas, on which many persons were seated conversing.

With the exception of the fountain, the description neatly fits the interior which Wyman achieved in the Bradbury building just six years after Bellamy's book was published.

This narrative has been contested by John Crandell, who claims that the original story was unsubstantiated and relied on a single testimony from Wyman's daughters.

According to a story told by Wyman's grandson, the famous sci-fi figure Forrest J Ackerman, Wyman was troubled by the responsibility of taking on the commission. Both he and his wife Belle were Spiritualists, and the couple decided to consult the spirits for guidance. Using a planchette, a device similar to a Ouija board, they traced out the message

Mark Wyman take the Bradbury building and you will be... Successful.

Mark Wyman was George's younger brother, who had died at the age of 8. At first, they had trouble reading the final word, as it was written upside down in relation to the rest of the message.

As a result, Wyman accepted the commission, and Bradbury was pleased with the drawings and plans for a five-story building at the corner of Broadway and Third Street. The building was completed a year later in 1893 although costs spiralled from $175,000 to $500,000, largely as a result of Bradbury specifying the best quality materials for all aspects of the construction.

The Bradbury building was met with critical acclaim, including a positive review in Arts and Architecture magazine. However, it was Wyman's only major success. In the following years, Wyman received numerous commissions for new buildings. He decided to bolster his qualification with an architectural correspondence course, but this seems to have turned him away from using interior light as an architectural element. His office buildings took on a heavy solid style and most have subsequently been demolished, whilst the Bradbury building is still much celebrated.

There are some differences regarding the standard history of Wyman's involvement in the design of the Bradbury Building. One claim is that Esther McCoy, a principal historian of Los Angeles architecture, did not consult primary sources other than statements of Wyman's relatives. Specifically, their statements that George worked for Sumner Hunt at the time the Bradbury Building was designed. John Crandell has claimed that there is no direct evidence from contemporaneous sources that Wyman worked directly for Hunt prior to Hunt's retaining Wyman as executive architect for the Byrne Building nine months following completion of the Bradbury.

== List of works ==
George Wyman's works include (in Los Angeles unless otherwise noted):

- National Home for Disabled Volunteer Soldiers Pacific Division, 1888
- Bradbury Building, 1891-1893
- Fred J. Byrne Building, 1895-1896
- Tajo Building, 1896-1897
- L.A. Ice and Cold Storage Building, 1903
- George A. Garlow House, Huntington Park, 1903-1904
