= McCullagh–Jones House =

Historic house in California, United States

- U.S. National Register of Historic Places
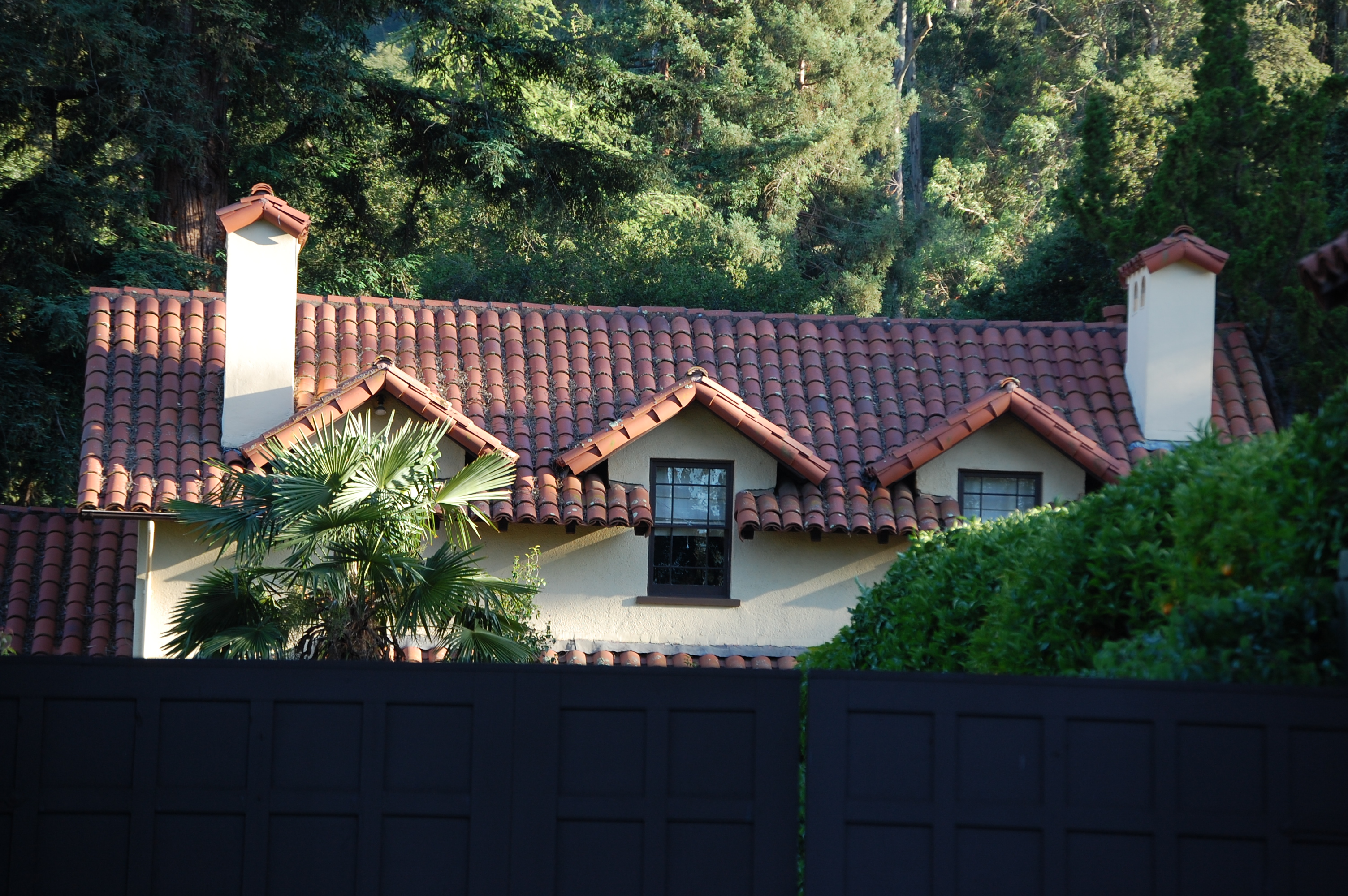
- The house in 2010

- Location within California
- Location: 18000 Overlook Road, Los Gatos, California
- Coordinates: 37°13′37″N 121°59′36″W
- Area: 1.8 acres (0.73 ha)
- Built: 1870
- Architect: Willis Polk
- Architectural style: Spanish Colonial Revival
- NRHP reference No.: 74000558
- Added to NRHP: October 29, 1974

The McCullagh–Jones House is a historic house in Los Gatos, California. It was built prior to 1873, and redesigned in 1931. It is listed on the National Register of Historic Places.

== History ==
A two-story farmhouse had been completed by 1870; the owners were Frank H. McCullough and his wife, née Mary Evans. The McCulloughs, who were from Philadelphia, sold the house in 1873 and bought it back in 1880. Frank McCullough's father, Robert, was the first Secretary-Treasurer of the Philadelphia Trust, Safe Deposit and Insurance Company. His wife, Mary McCullough, served as the president of the American Peony Society.

The house was purchased by Horace Jones in 1939.

== Architectural significance ==
The McCulloughs hired architect Willis Polk to redesign the house in the Spanish Colonial Revival style in 1931. It has been listed on the National Register of Historic Places since October 29, 1974.
