= Bourn Mansion =

Historic house in San Francisco

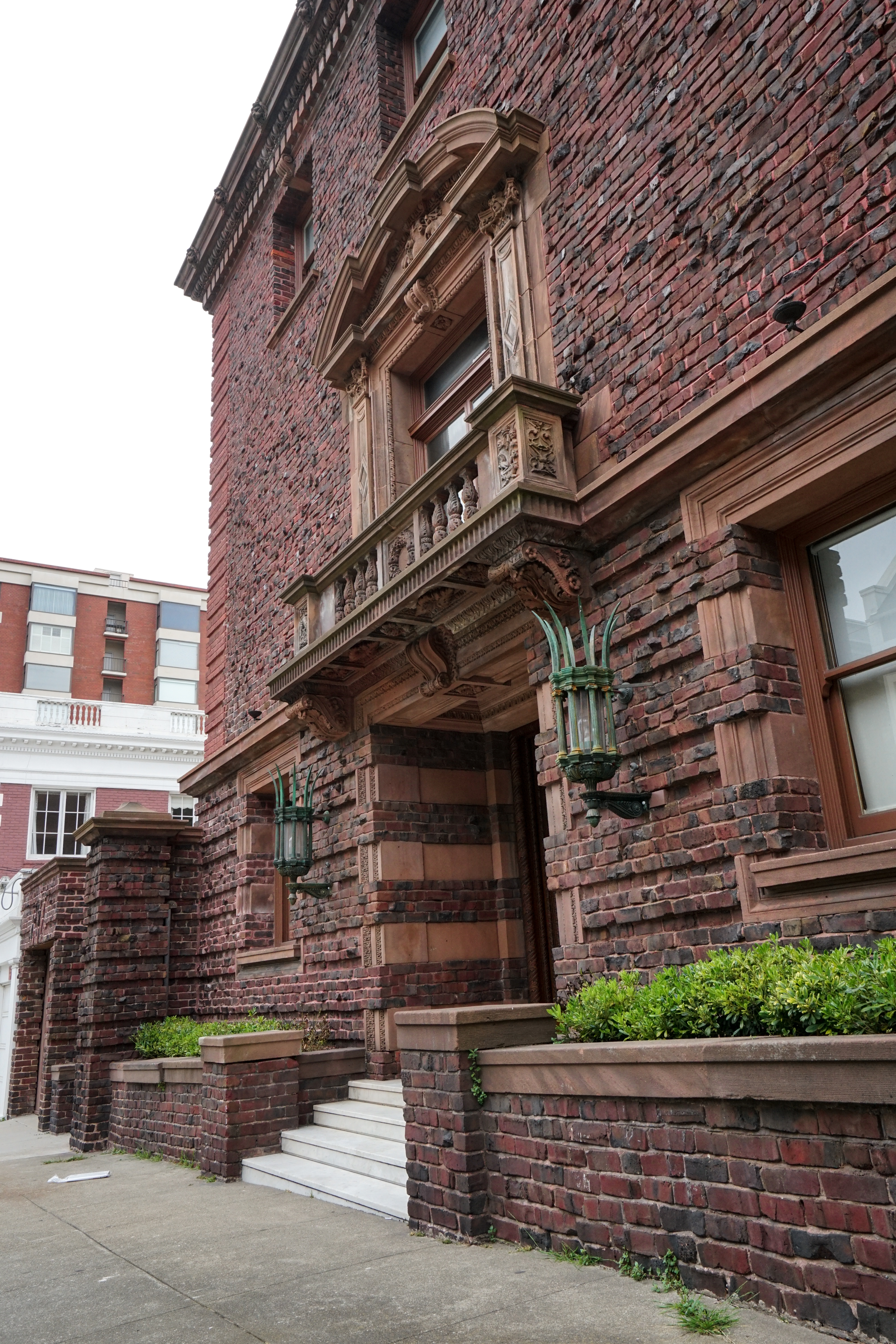

- Location within San Francisco County Location within California Location within the United States
- 37.7941°N 122.4332°W
- Location: 2550 Webster Street, San Francisco, California, U.S.

History
- Built: 1896
- Built for: William Bowers Bourn II

Site notes
- Architect: Willis Polk
- Architectural style: Georgian architecture

San Francisco Designated Landmark
- Designated: April 4, 1971
- Reference no.: 38

Bourn Mansion is a historic home built in 1896, and located at 2550 Webster Street in the Pacific Heights neighborhood of San Francisco, California.

== History ==
The house was built for William Bowers Bourn II and his wife Agnes Moody. At the age of 17, Bourn had inherited a successful gold mine named the Empire Mine (now the Empire Mine State Historic Park), among his other business ventures.

Bourn commissioned architect Willis Polk to design the 9,762 sq ft (906.9 m^{2}) house. Polk later designed many of Bourn's buildings, including his Filoli country estate in Woodside, California; which was light and informal in design.

The Bourn Mansion exterior looks like an English townhouse with red clinker bricks and dramatic chimneys; and the interior was designed with a traditional formalist style, very heavy and dark. The building has 28 rooms and 14 fireplaces.

In the 1970s, the Bourn Mansion was purchased by socialite Arden Dee Van Upp (née Rich) and her partner, they were known for their lavish rock and roll themed parties in the house. In 1975, Arden's teenaged daughter Tammy Ann was nationally famous for her belly dance routines with her large python snake named Gideon, which often seen at the Bourn Mansion parties.

After a sale of the property in 2010, the Bourn Mansion was underwent seismic retrofit in 2011, and was renovated in 2012. At the time of sale the asking price was US$2.9 million, with 14-bedrooms, and 4.5-bathrooms.

== See also ==
- List of San Francisco Designated Landmarks
