= Tobin House =

- U.S. National Register of Historic Places
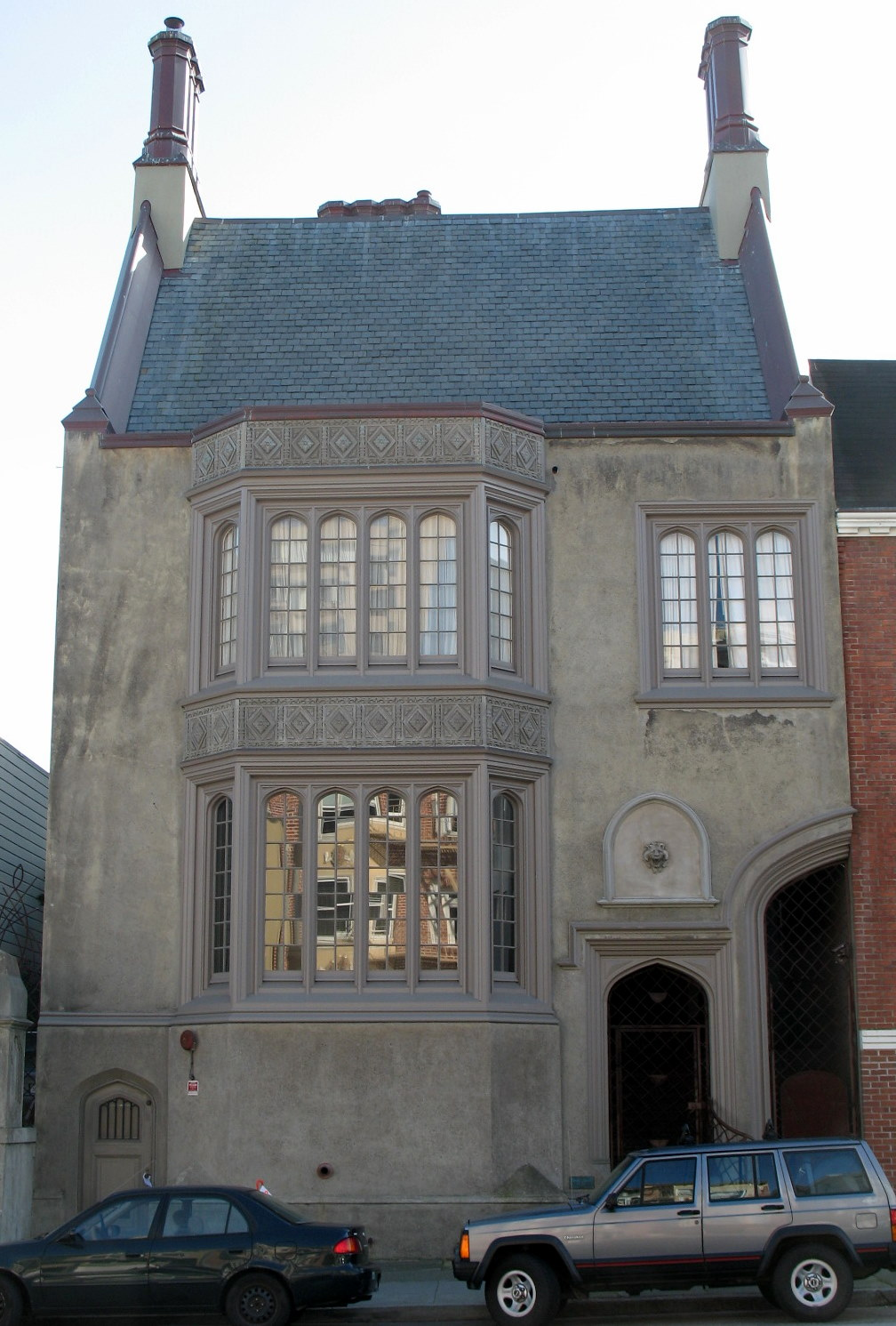

- Location within San Francisco County Location within California Location within the United States
- Location: 1969 California St., San Francisco, California
- Coordinates: 37°47′22″N 122°25′36″W
- Built: 1915
- Architect: Willis Polk
- Architectural style: Tudor Gothic Revival
- NRHP reference No.: 09000806
- Added to NRHP: October 5, 2009

The Tobin House is a historic home located in the Lower Pacific Heights neighborhood in San Francisco, California built in the Tudor Gothic Revival style in 1915. It was designed by Willis Polk for Joseph E. Tobin and Constance de Young, daughter of M. H. de Young.
