= Willis Polk =

American architect (1867–1924)

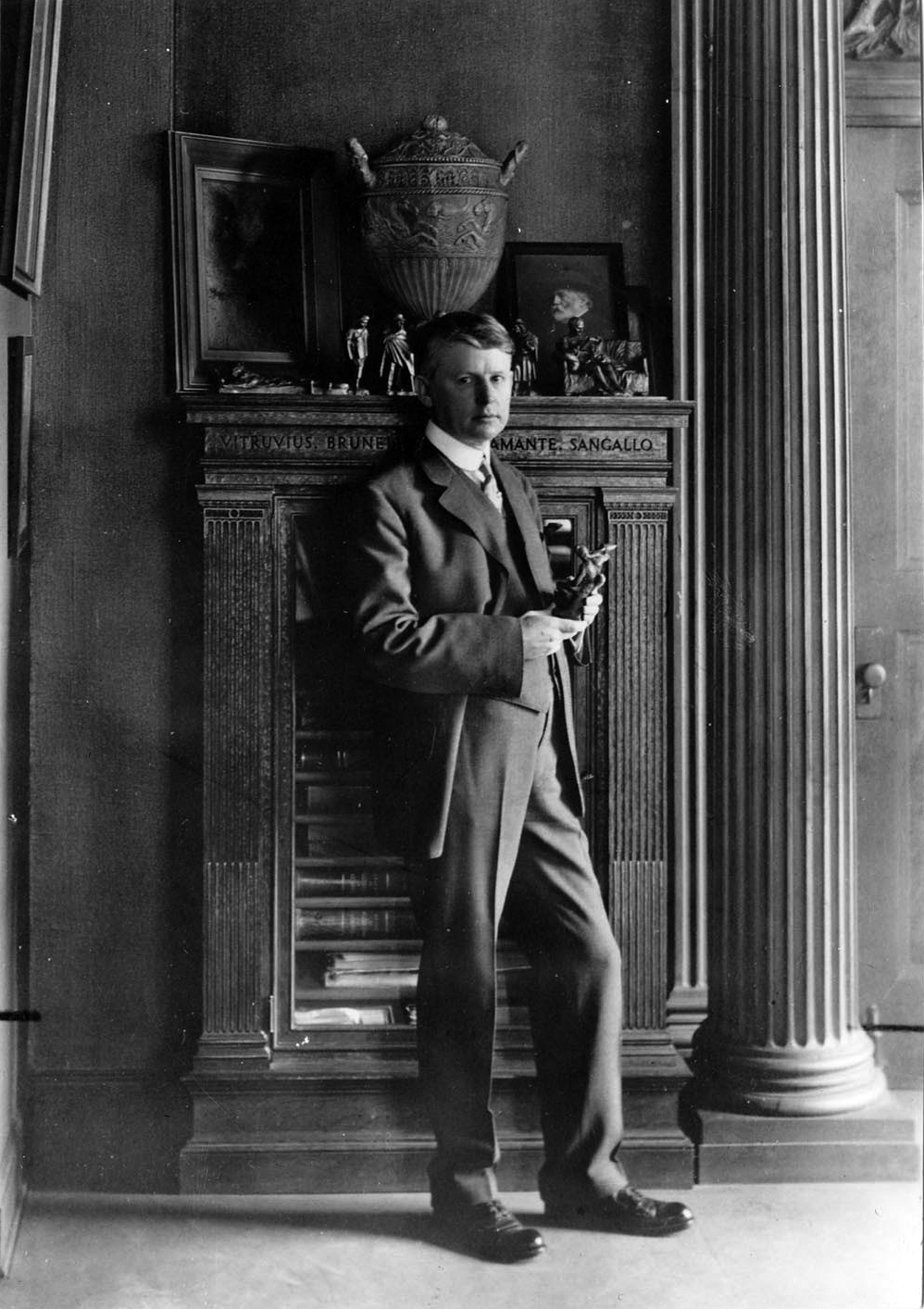
- Born: Willis Jefferson Polk; October 3, 1867; Jacksonville, Illinois, U.S.
- Died: September 10, 1924 (aged 56); San Mateo, California, U.S.
- Resting place: Santa Clara Mission Cemetery
- Occupation: Architect

Willis Jefferson Polk (October 3, 1867 – September 10, 1924) was an American architect, best known for his work in San Francisco, California. For ten years, he was the West Coast representative of D.H. Burnham & Company. In 1915, Polk oversaw the architectural committee for the Panama–Pacific International Exposition (PPIE).

== Early life and education ==
Willis Polk was born on October 3, 1867, in Jacksonville, Illinois to architect builder Willis Webb Polk (1836-1906). The eldest of four children, in 1873 he moved with his family to Saint Louis, Missouri and again by 1881 to Hope, Arkansas. Willis Jr began his architectural training with his brother Daniel in his father's office.

In 1885, Polk's family moved again to Kansas City, where Willis Webb Polk, the father, serving as a founding member of the Kansas City Architects Association, was able to introduce his eldest son to Adriance Van Brunt, principal of the firm Van Brunt & Howe to gain more experience as a draftsperson. Since Van Brunt & Howe of Boston had just established a branch office there, a few years later Willis Jr left Kansas City to seek his future studying under former Van Brunt associate William Robert Ware at Columbia University in New York City.

== Career ==
Willis Polk's early career included work with McKim, Mead & White, as well as Bernard Maybeck. In 1889, Polk joined the office of A. Page Brown in New York and moved with Brown's firm to San Francisco, subsequently taking over the Ferry Building project following Brown's death. Though his own career was inconsistent during these years, Polk became an active and outspoken advocate for the architectural profession and the standards of good design. During 1890-91 he published three issues of the Architectural News, conceived as an alternative to the conservative California Architect and Building News. In addition to Polk, John Galen Howard, Ernest Coxhead, and Bertram Goodhue were contributors to the News. In 1894, Polk led the Guild of Arts and Crafts, an organization of artists and architects, in an effort to create a Board of Public Works that would approve the design of all municipal projects. Polk also wrote a series of short critiques for The Wave, a San Francisco weekly review, between 1892 and 1899. At times harsh in his criticisms, Polk often alienated colleagues and former associates with his comments.

After much dissatisfaction with their logo, in 1894 the Sierra Club adopted a design by Willis Polk. It was used with small changes until 1998.

He struggled to earn commissions, and in 1897 he declared bankruptcy. However, an opportunity presented itself in 1899. Francis Hamilton, of the local firm Percy & Hamilton, died, and George Washington Percy asked Polk to be his new partner. Polk was primarily in charge of design and employee management, while Percy focused on the business end. The partnership gave Polk a relief to his debt and the opportunity to work on large-scale commercial structures. The partnership designed five buildings, including One Lombard Street. Addison Mizner was one of his apprentices.

In 1901, Polk went on a tour of Europe and Chicago. In Chicago, he met prominent architect Daniel Burnham. From 1903 to 1913, Polk was the West Coast representative of D.H. Burnham & Company. Polk designed several of his most notable structures while associated with the firm, including the Merchants Exchange Building, the tallest building in San Francisco upon its completion in 1903. The 1906 San Francisco earthquake opened up numerous opportunities for Polk to design Burnham structures. He was a member of Mayor Eugene Schmitz's Committee of Fifty leaders who undertook ambitious plans to rebuild a world-class city. Polk was tasked with convincing city officials to adopt Burnham's 1905 Plan of San Francisco.

By 1910, Willis Polk was recognized as one of the most influential architects and urban planners in the city. Polk was again credited for designing the tallest building in San Francisco when his Hobart Building was completed in 1914. In 1915, Polk was appointed the chair of the architectural planning committee for the Panama–Pacific International Exposition. When the exposition concluded, Polk led the effort to preserve Bernard Maybeck's Palace of Fine Arts. One of Polk's most influential commissions came in 1916, when he was tasked to design the Hallidie Building. Its glass curtain facade was a precursor to modern skyscraper development. It has been argued to be the most important building in San Francisco. Polk was a versatile architect, with particular skill in combining classical styles with environmental harmony. He was regarded for his elegant residential work, mainly in mansions and estates, in the Georgian Revival style for wealthy and prominent San Francisco residents.

After World War I, Polk's productivity declined. He oversaw the design of the War Memorial Opera House and Veterans Building, part of the planned Civic Center. In 1917, Polk designed but was not involved in the construction of the single family homes at 831, 837, 843 and 849 Mason Street in the exclusive area of Nob Hill in San Francisco at the intersection with California Street opposite the Mark Hopkins Hotel building. 849 Mason Street was redeveloped into four luxury apartments called Four at the Top in 1983 by the restaurateur and wine maker Pat Kuleto.

== Legacy and death ==
Polk died at home in San Mateo, California on September 10, 1924, at the age of 56. He is buried in Santa Clara Mission Cemetery in Santa Clara, California. After his death, his stepson Austin P. Moore ran his business Willis Polk & Co. into the 1930s.

Some of his papers are held at University of California, Berkeley, and scrapbooks are held at the California Historical Society and on microfilm at the Smithsonian Archives of American Art.

== List of works ==
=== In San Francisco ===
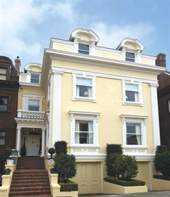
Polk-designed house in San Francisco

- Bourn Mansion (1896)
- Robert Louis Stevenson Memorial, San Francisco, with Bruce Porter (1897)
- Merchants Exchange Building (1904 with George Washington Percy, 1907 reconstruction with Julia Morgan)
- Alvinza Hayward Building (1906), San Francisco Landmark #161
- James C. Flood Mansion reconstruction (1907)
- Old Chronicle Building reconstruction (1907)
- Mills Building and Tower (1908 reconstruction, 1914 and 1918 expansions)
- Hobart Building (1914)
- Tobin House (1915)
- Hallidie Building (1917–1918)
- Mission San Francisco de Asís reconstruction (1917)
- St. Francis Yacht Club Clubhouse (c. 1924)
- Beach Chalet (1925)
- Kezar Stadium (1925)
- Spring Valley Water Company building
- Townhouses at 831-849 Mason Street

=== Elsewhere in California ===
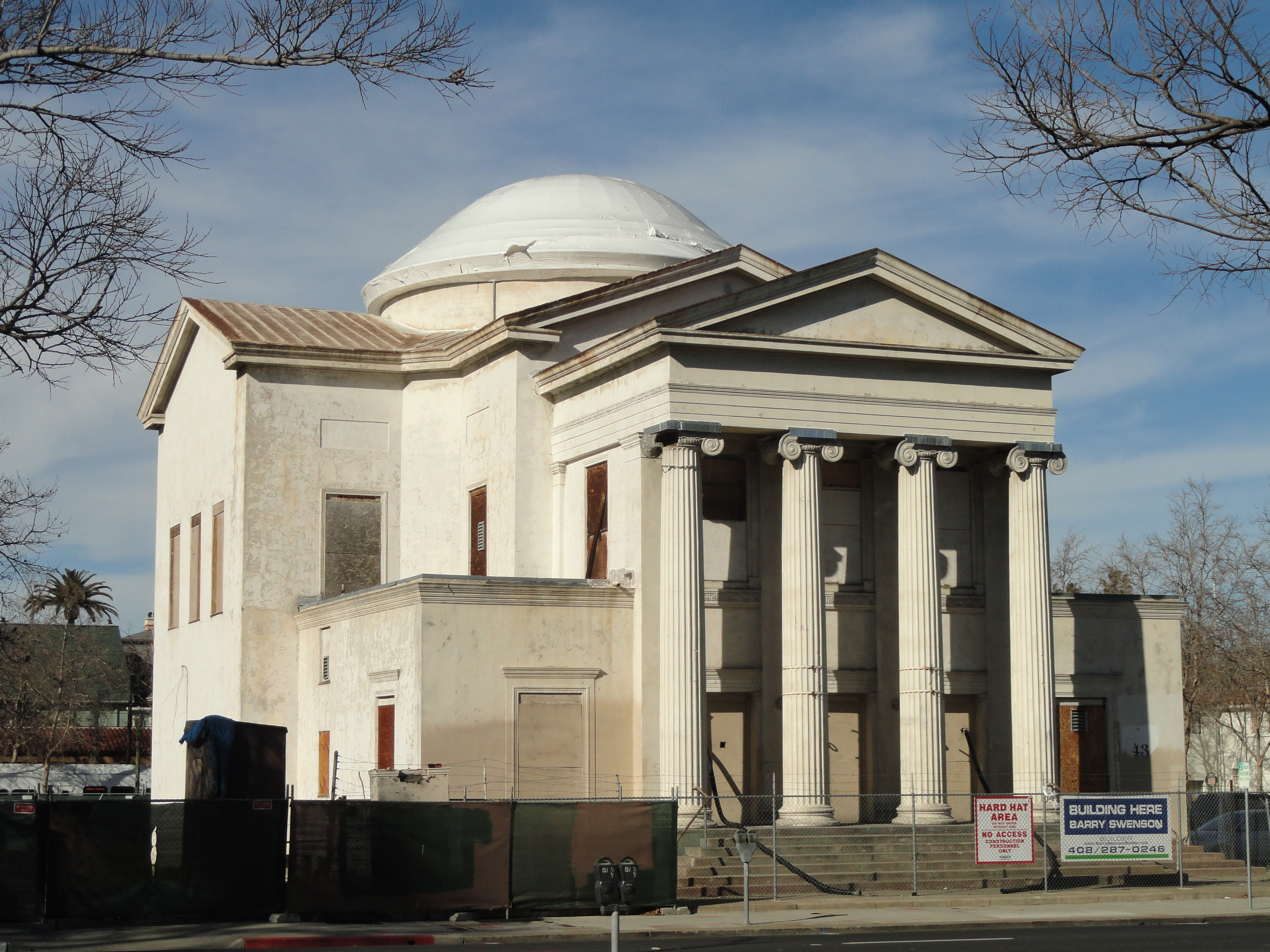
First Church of Christ Scientist, San Jose

- Le Petit Trianon at De Anza College, Cupertino (1892)
- Valentine Rey house, Belvedere (1893)
- Wyntoon, Siskiyou County (1899)
- First Church of Christ Scientist, San Jose (1904)
- Sunol Water Temple, Sunol (1910)
- Western Pacific Passenger Depot, Sacramento (1910)
- St. Mark's Episcopal Church, Berkeley (1911)
- Irvine-Byrne Building, Los Angeles (1911 renovation)
- Pacific Gas & Electric Company River Station B, Sacramento (1912)
- Carolands Chateau, Hillsborough (1914–1916), built by Willis following plans by Ernest Sanson
- Filoli Estate, Woodside (1915–1917)
- McCullagh–Jones House redesign, Los Gatos (1931)
- Residence on the NE corner of 9th & Dolores, Carmel-by-the-Sea (1903), for Polk's parents, Willis & Endemial
- Residence at 86 Sea View, Piedmont, for James K. Moffitt
- Residence at 22 Roble Road, Berkeley, for Duncan McDuffie
