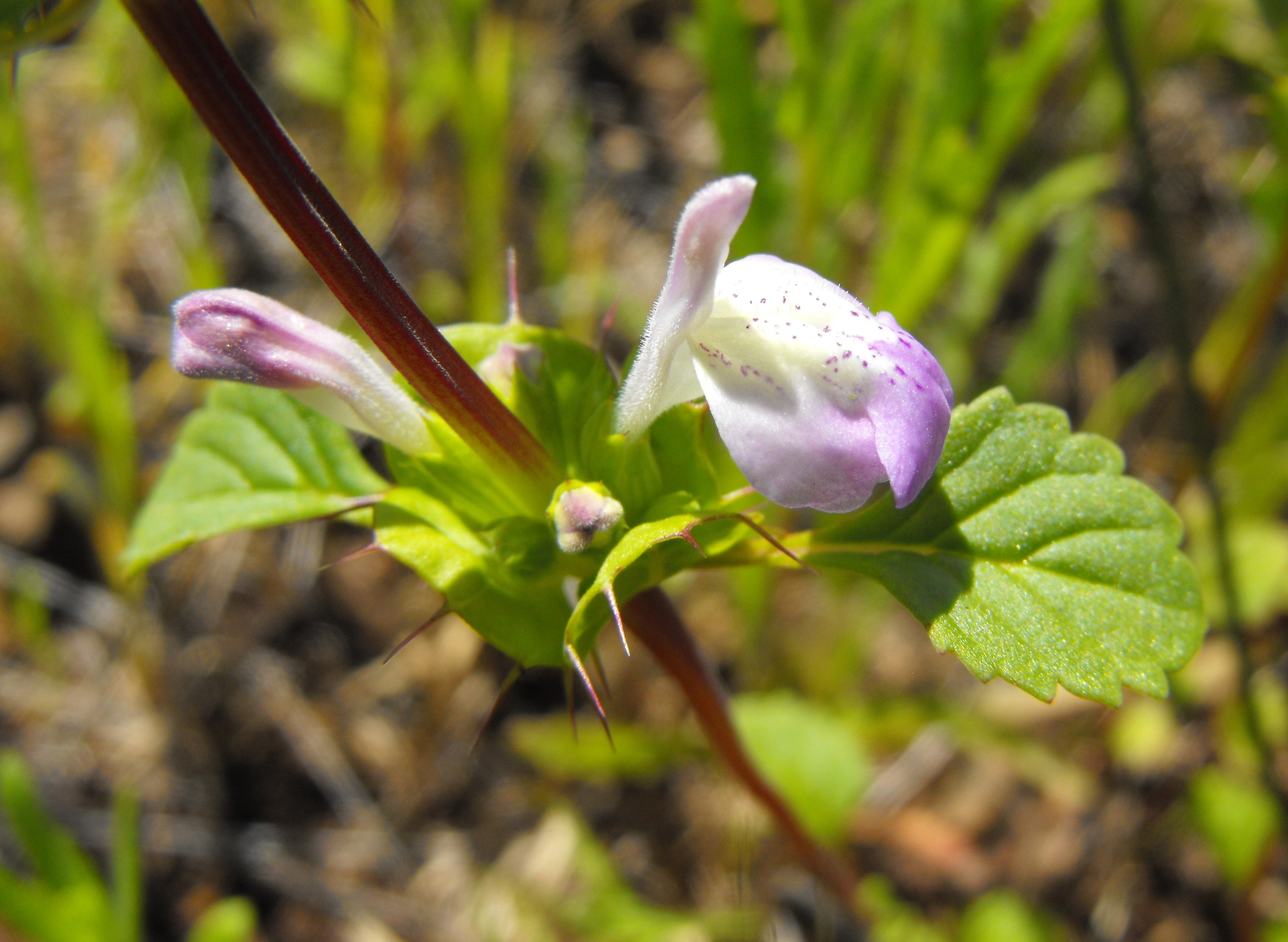

Conservation status
- Threatened (ESA)

- Critically Imperiled (NatureServe)

Scientific classification
- Kingdom: Plantae
- Clade: Tracheophytes
- Clade: Angiosperms
- Clade: Eudicots
- Clade: Asterids
- Order: Lamiales
- Family: Lamiaceae
- Genus: Acanthomintha
- Species: A. ilicifolia

Binomial name
- Acanthomintha ilicifolia A.Gray

= Acanthomintha ilicifolia =

Acanthomintha ilicifolia San Diego thornmint

Species of flowering plant

Acanthomintha ilicifolia, known by the common name San Diego thornmint, is a rare species of flowering plant in the mint family. It is native to Baja California and San Diego County, California, where it is a resident of the chaparral and coastal sage scrub plant communities and vernal pools.

Acanthomintha ilicifolia has been extirpated from many of the sites where it was previously noted in San Diego County. It is a federally listed threatened species in the United States under the Endangered Species Act of 1973 (ESA). This species is also listed as endangered under the California Endangered Species Act which means that killing or possessing the plants is prohibited within California unless authorized by the California Department of Fish and Game.

== Description ==
Acanthomintha ilicifolia is a petite annual herb growing up to about 15 centimeters (6 in) in maximum height. It has rounded to oval serrated leaves up to 1.5 cm (5/8 in) long. The inflorescence is a cluster of flowers with oval-shaped bracts nearly a centimeter long which are edged with long spines. Each flower is about a centimeter wide and white, often tinted purple to pink, with a hooded upper lip and a slightly longer lower lip. The flowers of the San Diego thornmint distinguish it from the other members of its genus by the hairless anthers and style.

It germinates in late winter, flowers in April–May, and sets its seeds in June–July. Each flower can produce a maximum of 4 seeds, with each plant producing between 70 and 200 seeds. The species has been shown to have a seed bank. Seed age is associated with germination, with higher rates of germination recorded among older seeds.

== Distribution and habitat ==
This species is generally limited to San Diego County, California, and select areas of Baja California, Mexico. The distribution is higher in the United States, with over 80 historical occurrences listed in 2009 versus 13 occurrences in Mexico.

It is found in chaparral, coastal sage scrub, and grassland habitats. It grows in gabbro and calcareous clay soils, usually on gentle slopes between 15 and 20 degrees.

== Ecology ==
While relatively little is known about the pollination of the species, it is believed to be pollinated by bees and checkered beetles. Two other members of the Acanthomintha genus, the San Mateo thornmint (Acanthomintha duttonii) and heartleaf thornmint (A. obovata ssp. cordata), are known to self-pollinate, and there is evidence of this for the San Diego thornmint as well.

== Conservation ==
As of 1998, the population of the San Diego thornmint is estimated to be between 150,000 and 170,000. Most occurrences have between 100 and 10,000 plants, with the largest occurrence boasting 60,000 in 1993. When the species was listed under the ESA in 1998, there were an estimated 52 known occurrences of the plant in the United States and 9 in Mexico, and 32 known extant occurrences. At the time of the 2009 5-year review, estimates identified around 80 known occurrences with approximately 55 extant occurrences.

Seed dispersal for the San Diego thornmint is limited, so the range of the species has remained largely the same. Although more occurrences of the plant have been found since it was listed under the ESA, it is likely that they existed before.

=== Major threats ===
Major threats toward the San Diego thornmint fall into five categories:

==== Factor 1: Destruction or modification of habitat ====
This is the most significant factor affecting the species. Older threats that have since lessened in significance include mining operations that alter soil state. Newer threats include destruction by fire and invasive species. Some of the most common invasive species in the habitat are Avena spp., Brachypodium distachyon, Brassica nigra, Centaurea melitensis, Cynara cardunculus, and Foeniculum vulgare. Other examples of habitat modification for the species include general urbanization, grazing, dumping, and off-road vehicle usage.

==== Factor 2: Over-collection ====
At the time that the species was listed as threatened, there were concerns that over-collection was a key detrimental factor. This includes legal and illegal collection for scientific or vandalistic reasons. However, this factor has become less critical in the species’ survival.

==== Factor 3: Predation ====
Two largest predators are rabbits and snails that have possibly eliminated a few occurrences of thornmint. Generally, predation is not the top concern among conservationists.

==== Factor 4: Insufficient protective legislation ====
The Endangered Species Act of 1973 is the primary legislation that protects the thornmint species. Regional efforts from the city of San Diego and the surrounding county provide species regulation as well. However, many of these regional efforts are based around the official ESA listing. These local regulations are ineffective without federal guidelines. Along with this, occurrences of the species are not protected under Mexican legislation, exposing many occurrences to danger.

==== Factor 5: Other factors ====
Many occurrences of the thornmint are found in small population sizes, which may make them vulnerable to changes. Other factors include animal grazing and climate change.

=== Listing Under the ESA ===
The San Diego thornmint was listed as endangered under the California Endangered Species Act in January 1982. It was federally listed as threatened under the ESA on October 13, 1998.

Five-year reviews have been initiated in 2008, 2010, 2013, and 2021. Only one 5-year review has been published, in 2009. The review compiled scientific data concerning the thornmint's conservation status and recommended cooperation between state and landowners to continue effective conservation. The review also recommends a status change to level 8, having moderate threats with a high likelihood of recovery. The overall degree of severity was reduced and may be the reason why further 5-year plans have not been published.

The 5-year review found that only 2 occurrences of the San Diego thornmint have gone extinct since its listing under the ESA in 1998. In addition, 39 of the estimated 55 extant occurrences are protected in conserved areas, compared to 7 at the time of listing. The review points to working with private landowners to conserve the remaining 16 occurrences as an important step in conservation of the species.

=== Recovery plan ===
There is not currently a formal species status assessment or recovery plan for the San Diego thornmint. In 2008, the U.S. Fish and Wildlife Service designated 641 acres of both private and state/federal land in San Diego County as "Critical Habitat" for the San Diego thornmint.

Recent efforts to conserve the San Diego thornmint, such as the San Diego Thornmint Expansion Project, focus on reducing the impact of invasive species, habitat loss, and climate change. Studies on the pollination and gene flow of this species are also important for conservation and expansion of the plant into new areas.
