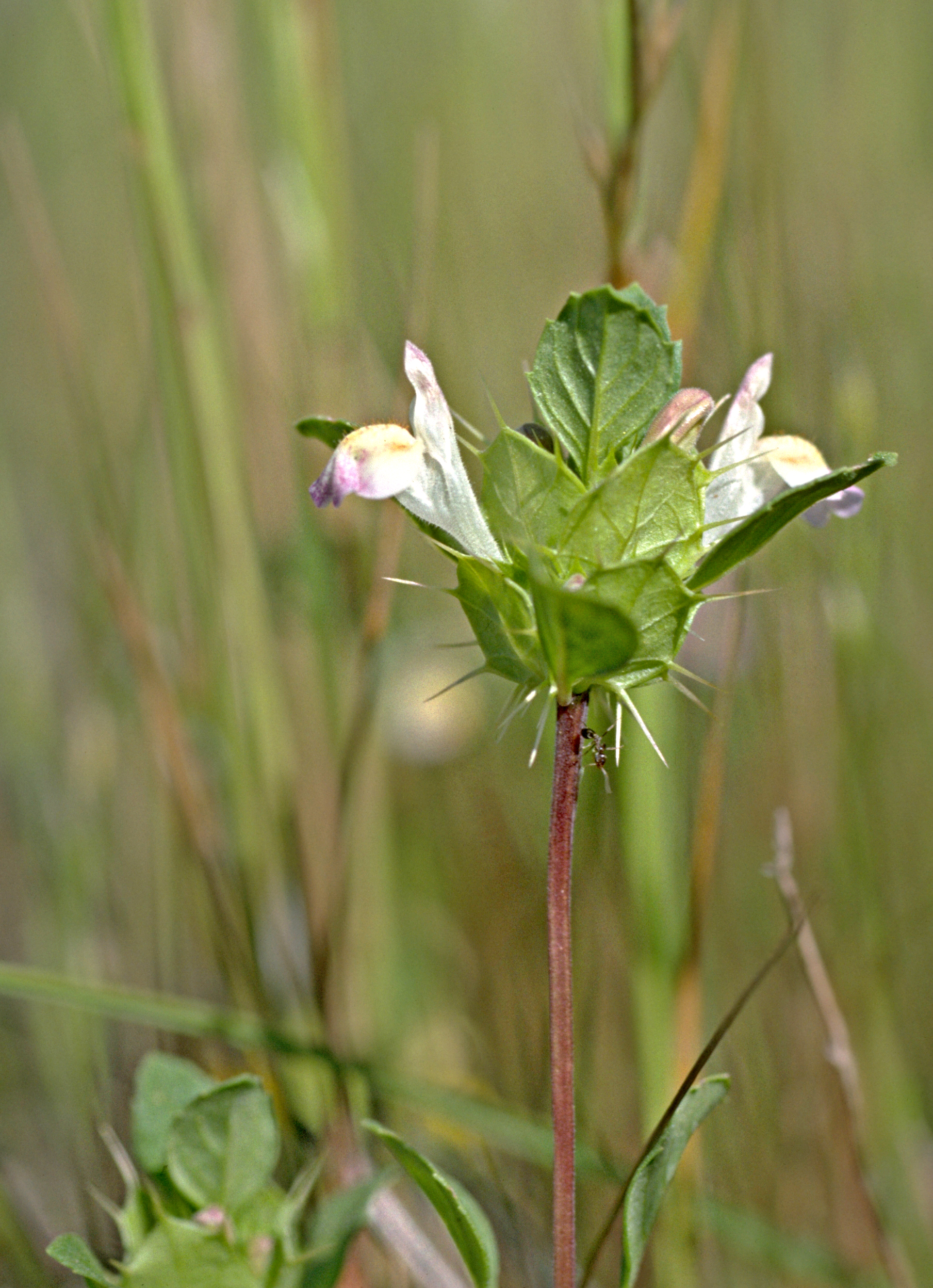

Conservation status
- Critically Imperiled (NatureServe)

Scientific classification
- Kingdom: Plantae
- Clade: Tracheophytes
- Clade: Angiosperms
- Clade: Eudicots
- Clade: Asterids
- Order: Lamiales
- Family: Lamiaceae
- Genus: Acanthomintha
- Species: A. duttonii

Binomial name
- Acanthomintha duttonii (Abrams) Jokerst

= Acanthomintha duttonii =

Species of flowering plant

Acanthomintha duttonii is a species of annual plant endemic to San Mateo County, California in the family Lamiaceae. It is commonly called San Mateo thornmint and is found growing on serpentine soils near the Crystal Springs Reservoir in a six-mile (10 km) long strip on the east side of Montara Mountain at elevations of approximately 150 to 300 meters.

== Taxonomy ==
The species is named in honor of Harry Arnold Dutton, who in 1949 located a patch of another rare plant Cupressus abramsiana on nearby Butano Ridge.

A. duttonii upper stamens are fertile, while the other species have sterile upper stamens. The presence of these fertile upper stamens is used to separate it as a different species from Acanthomintha obovata, in the past A. duttonii was referred to as subspecies of A. obovata (Acanthomintha obovata ssp. duttonii), James D. Jokerst split the taxon in 1991.

== Description ==
=== All Acanthomintha species ===
All four thornmint species are aromatic annual wildflowers native to the state of California in the US. The species have square stems that are erect growing. The leaves are petioled with leaf veins conspicuous and the leaf margins are often spiny. The inflorescences of the Acanthomintha genus are described as "head-like, in terminal clusters" by the genus authority James D. Jokerst. The flowers of this entire genus are like, most mints, two-lipped forming a tube with five sepals and the stamens enclosed within the zygomorphic corolla. The bracts in the inflorescence have marginal spines, thus the basis of the common name 'thornmints'. All Acanthomintha have the upper three lobes of its calyx acuminate and the lower two lobes oblong in shape; furthermore, all Acanthomintha corollae are funnel shaped and white with occasional tinting of purple. Each Acanthomintha species has four stamens, with the upper two reduced. Thornmint styles are slender and their fruit is ovoid in shape with a smooth exterior texture.

=== Acanthomintha duttonii ===
A. duttonii has a stem which is generally unbranched and less than twenty centimeters in length; the stem may present short hairs or none at all. Leaves of this species are eight to twelve millimeters in length, lanceolate to obovate in shape. The margins of this spiny leaf are occasionally serrate. The terminal inflorescences have bracts of about five to eleven millimeters; moreover, these bracts are ovate and green at the flower, with five or seven marginal spines, each three to seven millimeters. The virtually hairless to sparse short haired calyx is five to eight millimeters in length, while the corolla is 12 to 16 millimeters in extent. The white corolla is often tinged lavender in color; the corolla throat is cream colored and its upper lip is hooded, while the longer lower lip is reflexed and three-lobed. The upper lip is more diminutive than the lower, and is entire and shallowly hooded. The flower bracts are broadly ovate in shape with puberulent hairs and shiny. The bracts have seven to nine spines each. The anthers are short and hairy. The style is glabrous. Plants bloom in April into late June, with each flower when fertilized producing four nut-like seeds. Plants are self-fertile.

== Distribution ==
The range of this species is sharply limited within a portion of central San Mateo County on the eastern lower slopes of the Santa Cruz Mountains.

The single remaining large population, in Edgewood County Park, is a relict of a more extensive colony damaged by off-road motor-vehicle use. There is an introduced population at Pulgas Ridge Open Space Preserve, and native fragments along the lower slopes above Crystal Springs Reservoir in a six-mile-long (10 km) fragmented strip that includes the Edgewood colony.

== Ecology ==
This species is only known to grow on serpentine soils in grassland communities that are generally species-rich for serpentine soils; the area they are growing in on the San Francisco Peninsula also contains sloping chaparral. Other native species that grow in the same area include Nassella pulchra, Delphinium hesperium, and Hemizonia congesta var. luzulifolia, plus the exotic Lolium multiflorum.

Specific plant communities where this species is found are chaparral as well as foothill or valley grasslands. San Mateo thornmint populations occupy slopes or flatland with deep, heavy clay soil inclusions.

In general, serpentine soils normally provide an inhospitable environment for most plants. Several factors contribute to serpentine soils being inhospitable to plant growth including a low calcium-magnesium ratio, lack of essential nutrients namely nitrogen, potassium, and phosphorus, and high concentrations of heavy metals. Many species that have evolved to grow on serpentine soils have are not adapted to compete with other plants and do not survive well under competition in other soils that tend to have denser plant numbers; in serpentine soils plant densities are lower resulting in less direct competition for resources like light and water.

== Conservation ==
This rare annual species of wildflower has populations that fluctuates yearly with recorded population ranges in the 1980s from 50,000 plants to as few as 5,000 plants a year.

This species became federally listed as endangered in 1989. California listed San Mateo thornmint as "rare, threatened, or endangered in California" under List 1B.1 in 1979, and further classifies this plant as "seriously endangered in California". A state of California endangerment rank of S1.1 has been assigned, implying that there are fewer than six populations, fewer than 1000 individuals or fewer than 2000 acres (8 km^{2}). In the case of A. duttonii, the criteria of occurrences and area may both be present. A global rank of G1 (critically imperilled globally) has been attached to this wildflower.

Significant threats to A. duttonii identified in 1989 to 1998 were continuing urbanization of the San Francisco Peninsula, an inherently fragmented population and off-road vehicle use. Two or possibly three colonies of San Mateo thornmint may have been eradicated in the 1970s to 80s by off-road vehicle use and road maintenance crews.
