= Hassler Health Farm =

- Interactive map of the Hassler Health Farm area
- Former names: San Francisco Health Farm (1927–1931)
- Alternative names: Hassler Health Home

General information
- Status: Demolished
- Type: Tuberculosis Sanatorium, Public Hospital
- Location: 167 Edmonds Road, San Carlos, California 94070 United States
- Coordinates: 37°28′35″N 122°17′19″W
- Opened: 1927
- Closed: 1964; converted into a public hospital, which closed in 1972
- Demolished: 1985

Hassler Health Farm, formerly known as San Francisco Health Farm between 1927 and 1931, was a tuberculosis sanatorium for patients of the San Francisco Bay Area, owned by the City of San Francisco. It was located in a remote part of San Mateo County, California, in what is today San Carlos, until 1964. After the discovery of antibiotics, tuberculosis became a reduced threat, leading the building to be converted into a hospital for the poor. It was closed in 1972 and sat empty until 1985, when the buildings were demolished. Today, the grounds are home to the 366-acre Pulgas Ridge Open Space Preserve.

== History ==
=== Tuberculosis Sanatorium ===
In the 19th and early 20th centuries, tuberculosis became a widespread public concern, as the disease, which infects the lungs, was common among the poor. After tuberculosis was determined to be contagious, infected patients were either encouraged or forced to enter sanatoria. According to early medical exports, rest in a dry, temperate climate, surrounded by lush scenery and little stress, was thought to treat tuberculosis, along with rheumatism, asthma, and other diseases. San Francisco, as a major urban center, developed a need for a location to sequester tuberculosis patients away from others. A rural site in San Mateo County, far from development and surrounded by these suggested amenities, was selected for the sanitarium. The facility opened in 1927.

As the San Francisco Department of Public Health first administered the site, it was originally named the San Francisco Health Farm, although by 1931, it was known as the Hassler Health Farm. The site's namesake was Dr. William Hassler, the Director of San Francisco's Board of Health in the 1910s and 1920s. Over the years, the San Francisco Chronicle reported that the site's capacity increased from 44 beds in 1927 to 100 beds by 1939.

As part of a Works Progress Administration project funded at $100,000, additional buildings were added to the campus in the early 1940s, further increasing the capacity to 260 beds. John Bakewell Jr., whose other projects ranged from San Francisco City Hall to Stanford's Hoover Tower, designed the site, working alongside contractors Albert E. Mangs and Associates Pacific Construction, M. E. Vukicvich, Martinelli Construction, and R. A. McLean. Workers constructed a new kitchen and dining buildings, two ward buildings, a children's building, residences for doctors and nurses, an improved sewage system, a new water tank, and an incinerator. In an attempt to support the recovery of patients, the grounds were kept pristine, with Spanish tiled roofs and big decks off the wards with lounge chairs. Friends and family members could visit patients in other rooms. Records of patients, as well as death certificates, are stored at the County Recorder's Office in Redwood City.

=== Public Hospital ===
Advances in medicine in the late 1950s, including the widespread availability of antibiotics that could treat and cure tuberculosis patients, reduced the need for separate treatment facilities. In 1964, the sanatorium was closed and converted into a chronic care hospital for the poor, still under the name Hassler Health Farm or Hassler Health Home. Most patients were elderly. In 1972, the facility was closed permanently, and the buildings sat vacant until the grounds were sold to the Midpeninsula Regional Open Space District in 1983.

=== Abandoned Grounds ===
In between the hospital's closure in 1972 and its demolition in 1985, the buildings sat idle. Limited fencing was erected around the site, but the grounds were frequently visited by local high school students who went to party. It was during this time that the site developed a local reputation for being a former ward for the mentally insane, although this was never the case. Local residents recall near-accidents resulting from walking on the caving-in roofs of the hospital's wards and sneaking around the grounds after large storms. In the early 1980s, a local student called into a radio program on a Friday and announced a big party was to be held at the site that night. Kids showed up, as did many police officers, who had been tipped off by the radio announcement.

Among local visitors to the abandoned grounds, Jon Dunkle, locally referred to as "The Peninsula Serial Killer," evidently frequented the site. Dunkle was ultimately found guilty of the murder of four teenage boys, the first of which was 15-year-old John Davies on November 8, 1981. Based on official testimony from Davies' family members, the site of the first murder was likely at the Hassler Health Farm grounds, where Dunkle had lured Davies, a family friend who would often visit the site together with Dunkle.

There were various attempts to redevelop the property. In May 1975, then-San Francisco mayor Joseph Alioto suggested that the property be used as a halfway house for up to 500 Vietnamese residents following the end of the Vietnam War. Members of the Redwood City Woman's Club advocated for the use of Hassler Health Farm as a rehabilitation center for female alcoholics, or male alcoholics and derelicts. In November 1973, Proposition "I" was placed on the ballot for San Carlos voters, a bond that would have raised $1 million for the purchase of the property to keep it as open space. Although the site was seen as lucrative, especially since the development of the San Carlos hills, the proposition was rejected by voters.

== Pulgas Ridge Open Space Preserve ==
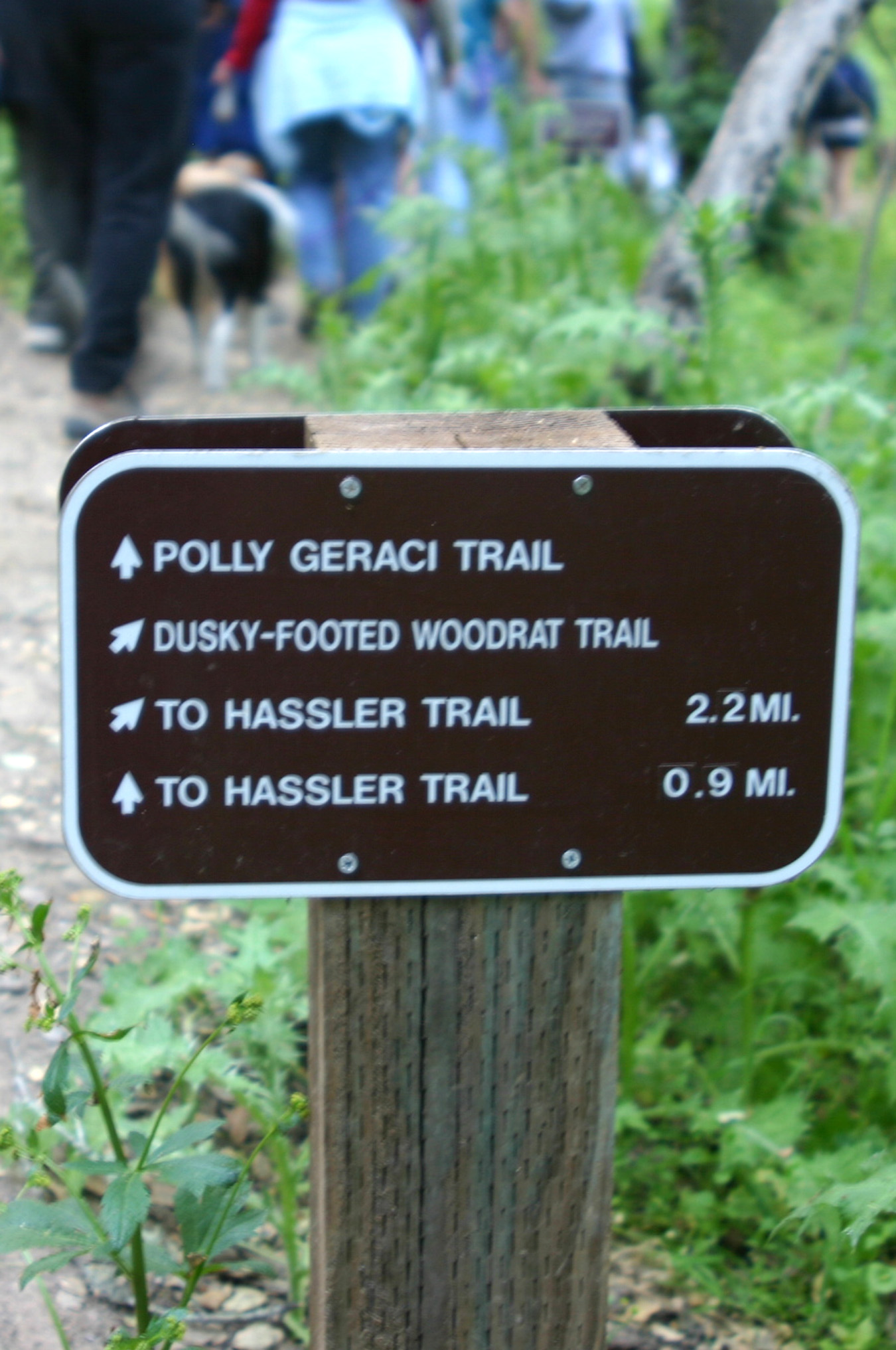
A trail sign at Pulgas Ridge Open Space Preserve, referencing the Hassler Health Farm and other local features.

Neighbors of the site approved a tax assessment in the early 1980s to help fund the purchase of the site, which was assisted by financial contributions from the Midpeninsula Regional Open Space District. In 1983, the City and County of San Francisco officially sold the area to the open space district. The sanitarium was demolished in 1985, leaving the site to be reclaimed by nature. The 366-acre grounds were opened to the public as Pulgas Ridge Open Space Preserve, with over 6 miles of trails, an off-leash dog area, and guided nature hikes. The word Pulgas, meaning "fleas" in Spanish, comes from Rancho de las Pulgas, the Spanish land grant that encompassed the present-day site.

When the sanatorium was operating, a grove of 102 Eucalyptus trees were planted at the site. The open space district began planting native plants in 1985, and in 1997, began removing non-native plants for environmental preservation, including Eucalyptus trees. In 2007, upon hearing news of additional tree removal, neighbors in the Brittan Heights area protested the district's efforts, although they were mostly unsuccessful. Less than 42 of the original 102 Eucalyptus trees remain on the site.

One trail on the property is named the Hassler Trail, and there are several physical remnants of the buildings still present today, including rock retaining walls and steps. On September 1, 2007, the San Mateo County Office of Education opened the Canyon Oaks Youth Center, a community school for local youth with mental health or behavioral issues, who live at the site and attend vocational classes. According to county reports, students have access to local trails on the property. As of 2021, SamTrans Route 295 serves the site once a day in each direction.

Notably, across Edgewood Road lies Edgewood Park & Natural Preserve. Through the 1960s, this site also had a similar purpose, first operating as the Canyon Sanatorium and later a gerontology hospital. Rates were advertised as $15 per week for selected cases, and for more details, interested parties were suggested to contact the medical director at the Flood Building in San Francisco.
