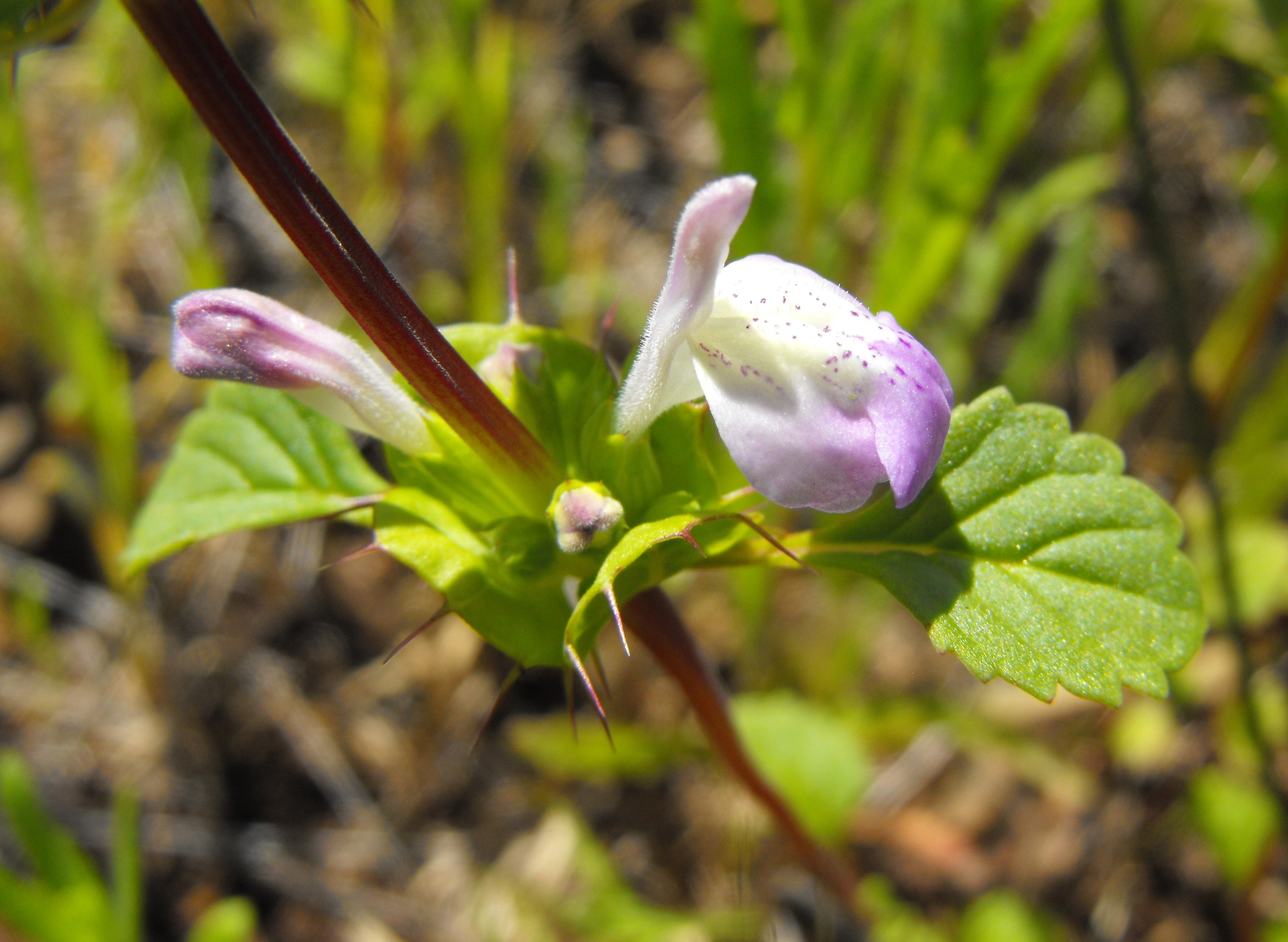
- Acanthomintha ilicifolia

Scientific classification
- Kingdom: Plantae
- Clade: Tracheophytes
- Clade: Angiosperms
- Clade: Eudicots
- Clade: Asterids
- Order: Lamiales
- Family: Lamiaceae
- Subfamily: Nepetoideae
- Tribe: Mentheae
- Genus: Acanthomintha (Gray) Gray

= Acanthomintha =

Thornmint

Genus of flowering plants

Acanthomintha is a genus of the mint family, Lamiaceae. The genus Acanthomintha is commonly referred to as thornmint or thorn-mint. There are four species within this genus, including the endangered species Acanthomintha duttonii. All four thornmints are native to the California Floristic Province. The origin of the genus name is from the identical Greek word meaning thornmint.

The four known species of Acanthomintha are:

Image	Scientific name	Distribution
	Acanthomintha duttonii (Abrams) Jokerst	San Mateo thorn-mint – San Mateo County
	Acanthomintha ilicifolia A.Gray	San Diego thorn-mint, San Diego thornmint – San Diego County and northern Baja California
	Acanthomintha lanceolata Curran	Santa Clara thorn-mint – inner Coast Ranges from Alameda County to San Luis Obispo County
	Acanthomintha obovata Jepson	San Benito thorn-mint – range from Alameda County to Los Angeles County

== Genus morphology ==
All thornmints are aromatic annual wildflowers with erect stems and petioled leaves. Inflorescences of thornmints are head-like, in clusters and terminal in form. In the genus Acanthomintha leaf veins are conspicuous and the leaf margins are always spiny, leading to the common name. The characteristics of the genus flower are with a two-lipped calyx and lobes spine-tipped, re-inforcing the basis of the common name. All Acanthomintha have the upper three lobes of its calyx acuminate and the lower two lobes oblong in shape. Acanthomintha corollae are funnel shaped, always white, but sometimes with a tinging of rose or lavender color. The corolla throat is cream colored and its upper lip is hooded, while the longer lower lip is reflexed and three-lobed. All Acanthomintha have four stamens, with the upper two reduced, whether they are sterile or not. Thornmint styles are slender and their fruit is ovoid in shape with smooth exterior texture.
