= Cordilleras Creek =

Cordilleras Creek Arroyo de los Cadillos, Finger's Arroyo, Cordillas Creek
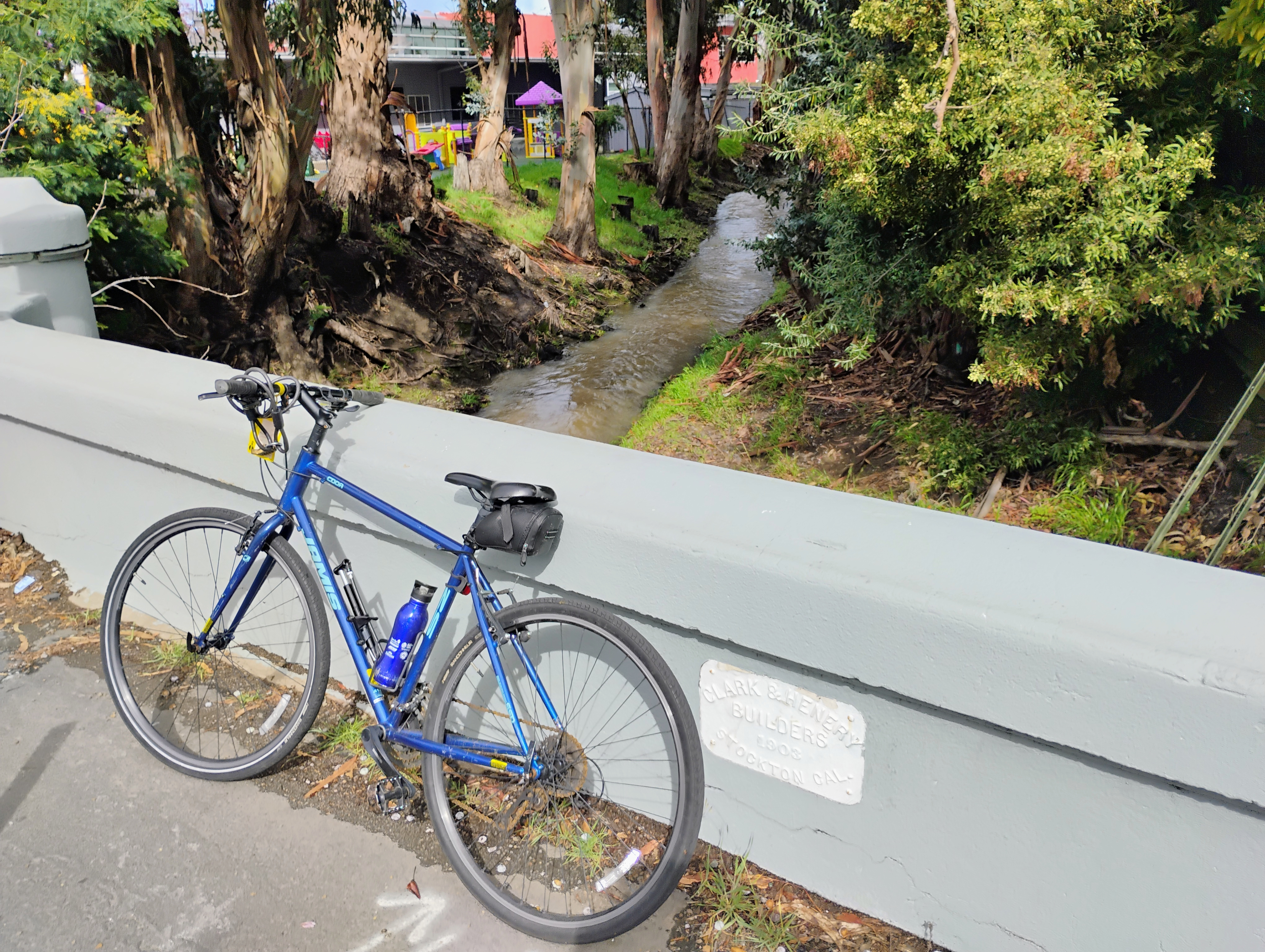
- Cordilleras Creek from Old County Road bridge

Location
- Country: United States
- State: California
- Region: San Mateo County
- Cities: Redwood City, San Carlos

Physical characteristics
- Source: Pulgas Ridge Open Space Preserve in the foothills of the Santa Cruz Mountains
  - location: San Carlos, California
  - coordinates: 37°28′39″N 122°17′55″W
  - elevation: 424 ft (129 m)
- Mouth: Smith Slough in west San Francisco Bay
  - location: Redwood City, California
  - coordinates: 37°29′55″N 122°14′28″W
  - elevation: 13 ft (4.0 m)

Cordilleras Creek is a 3.8-mile-long (6.1 km) northward-flowing stream originating in the Pulgas Ridge Open Space Preserve in the foothills of the Santa Cruz Mountains. It forms the border between San Carlos and Redwood City in San Mateo County, California, United States before entering Smith Slough where its waters course to Steinberger Slough and thence to San Francisco Bay.

== History ==
Historically, the creek was known as Arroyo de los Cadillos which means "Cockleburr Creek" in Spanish. Simon Theodore Finger settled on the Redwood City side of the creek in 1855 and planted a vineyard as well as olives. Born in Frankfurt, Germany in 1816, Theodore (as he was known) was listed in the 1860 U.S. Census as a farmer. The Arroyo de los Cadillos was generally misspelled as Cordillas. By 1862, it was known as Finger's Arroyo, then later Finger's Creek or Finger Creek. In 1877 the San Mateo County map shows it as Cordillas Creek; the Wellesley Park subdivision map labelled it Cordilleras Creek in 1888, and the USGS accepted this name in 1895. Local residents still called it Finger Creek for many years.

== Watershed and course ==
The Cordilleras Creek watershed drains 3.3 square miles (8.5 km^{2}). The creek is above ground for its entire length with the exception of culverted sections at road crossings.

From its beginnings in the Pulgas Ridge Open Space Preserve in San Carlos, just northwest of Interstate 280, Cordilleras Creek receives additional tributaries from Edgewood County Park and flows northwesterly along Edgewood Road. North of U. S. Highway 101, Cordilleras Creek flows into Smith Slough at the San Carlos airport, then Steinberger Slough and thence into San Francisco Bay. The Cordilleras Creek watershed includes Steinberger Slough, and its Pulgas Creek tributary.

== Habitat and wildlife ==
No steelhead (Oncorhynchus mykiss) were found in a fish sampling study in 1981. Leidy concluded that there was insufficient information to know whether Cordilleras Creek once supported trout or not. However, a possible steelhead carcass was found in 2002 and the creek has been determined to be of moderate to high potential for steelhead restoration.

== See also ==
- List of watercourses in the San Francisco Bay Area
