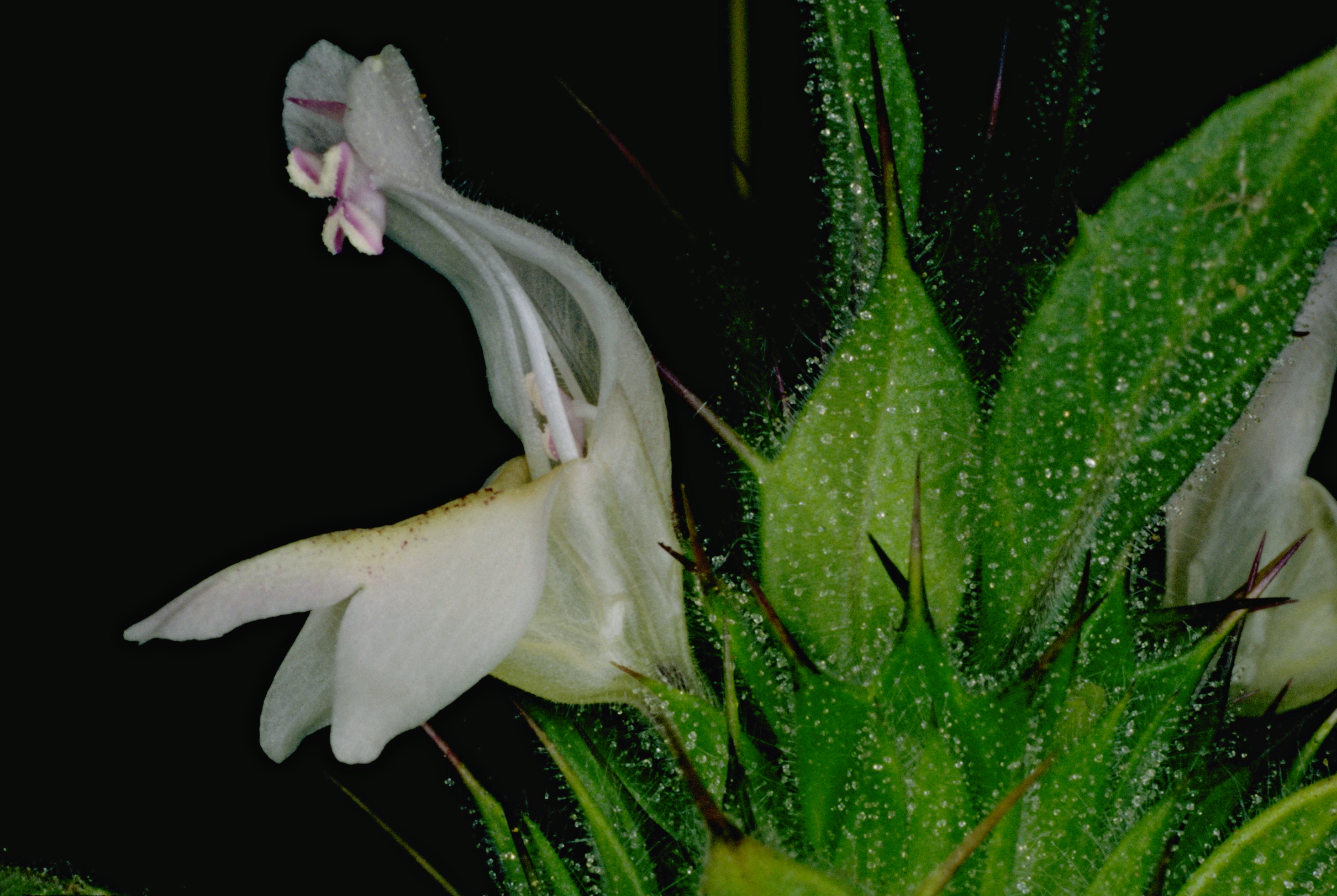

Conservation status
- Apparently Secure (NatureServe)

Scientific classification
- Kingdom: Plantae
- Clade: Tracheophytes
- Clade: Angiosperms
- Clade: Eudicots
- Clade: Asterids
- Order: Lamiales
- Family: Lamiaceae
- Genus: Acanthomintha
- Species: A. lanceolata

Binomial name
- Acanthomintha lanceolata Curran

= Acanthomintha lanceolata =

Species of flowering plant

Acanthomintha lanceolata is a species of flowering plant in the mint family known by the common name Santa Clara thornmint. It is endemic to California, where it is known from several counties surrounding and south of the San Francisco Bay Area. It is an uncommon resident of rocky habitat in coastal and inland mountain ranges.

== Description ==
This is a small, hairy annual herb growing to about 30 centimeters in maximum height. It is coated in glandular hairs and it has an unpleasant scent. The oval-shaped, toothed leaves are 1 to 2 centimeters long and have spiny, glandular surfaces.

The inflorescence includes bracts armed with centimeter-long spines and glandular, hairy white to pink-tinted flowers up to 2.5 centimeters long. Each flower has lobed, hooded upper and lower lips forming a deep cup.

Typical habitat type is shale or serpentine scree.
