= Pulgas Ridge Open Space Preserve =

Public recreation area in California, US

Coordinates: 37°28′42″N 122°17′24″W

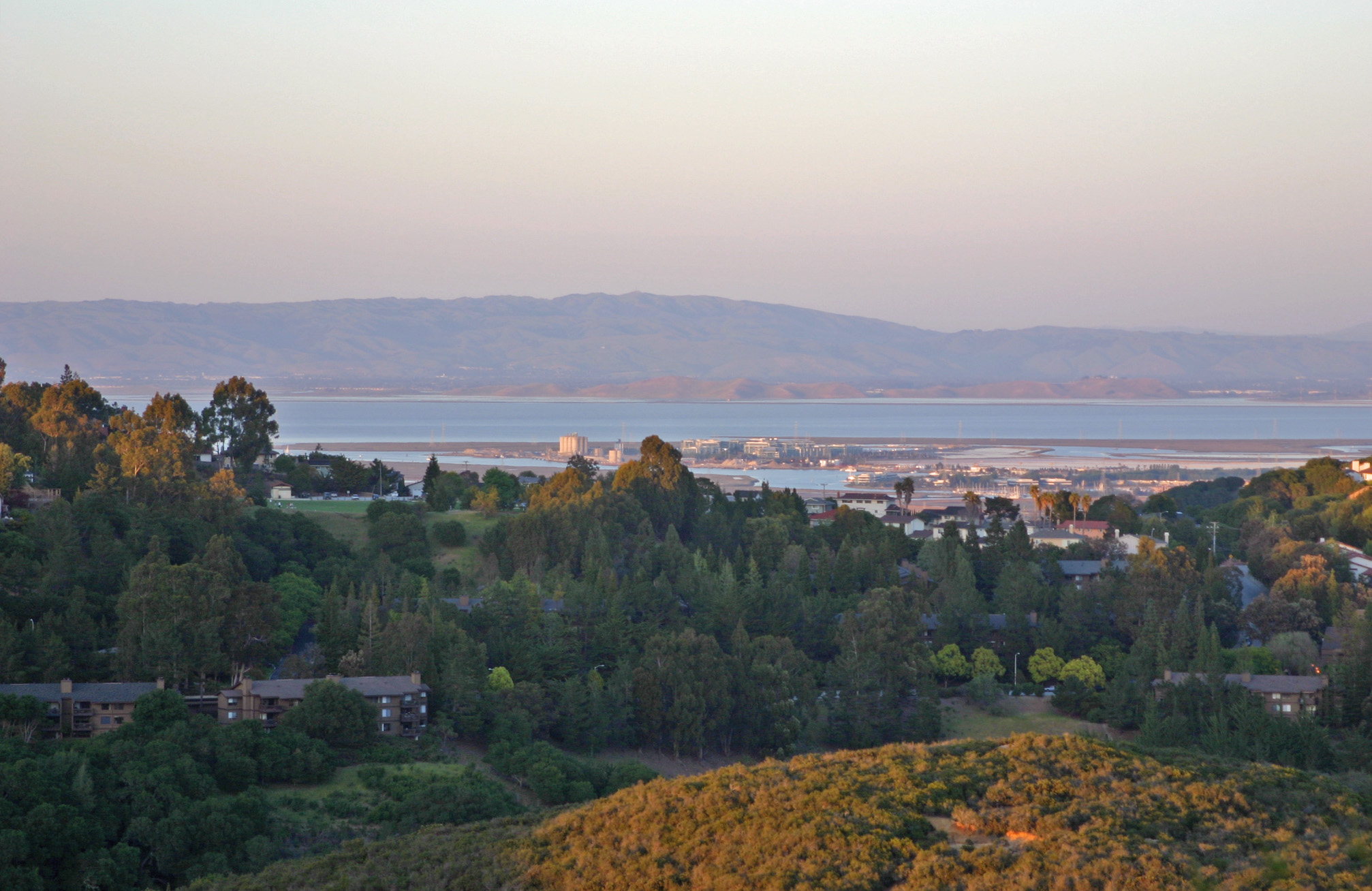
Higher elevation trails provide views of San Francisco Bay.

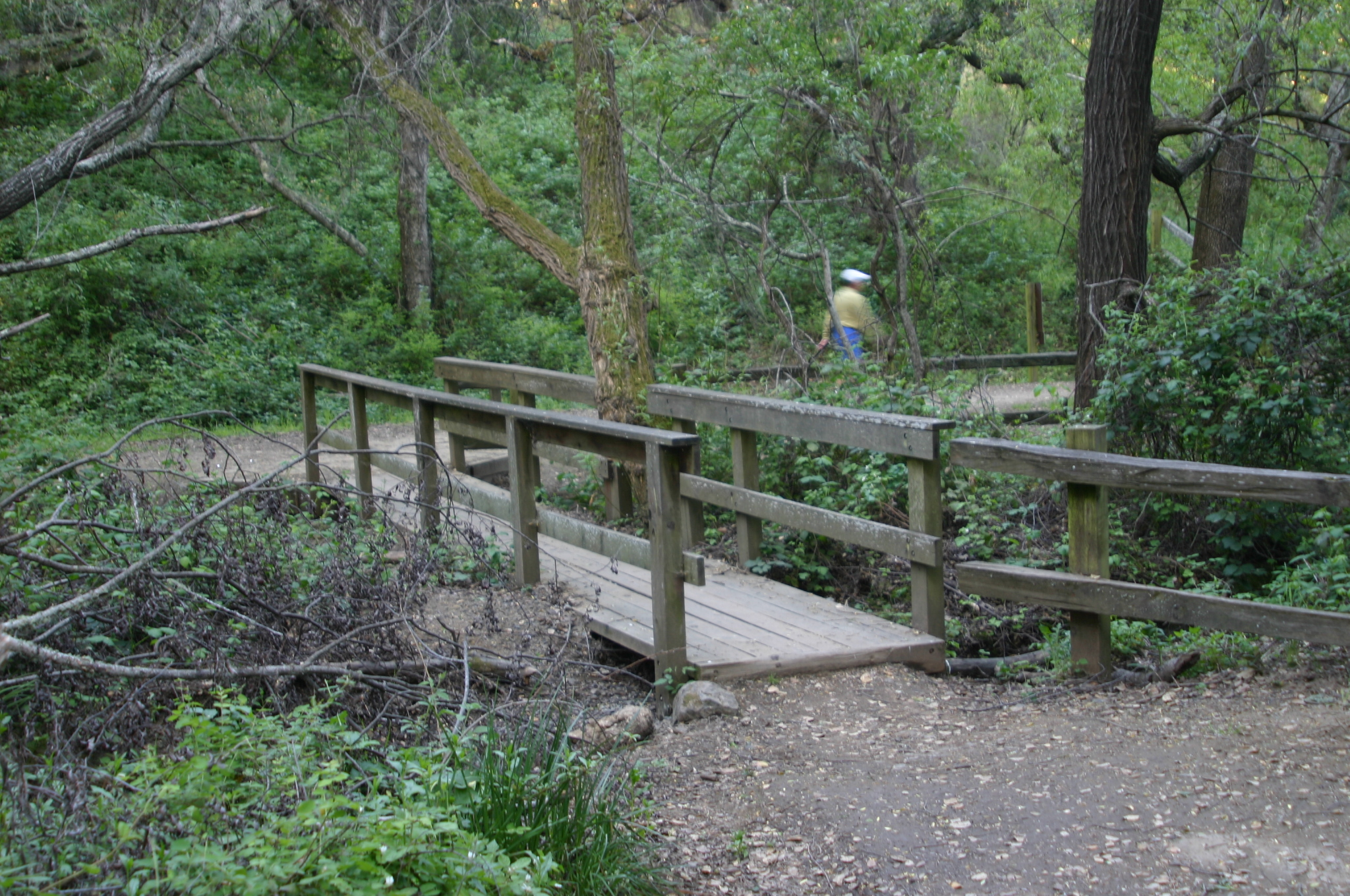
Lower elevation Pulgas Ridge Trail pass through lush mixed evergreen forest and oak woodlands.

Pulgas Ridge Open Space Preserve is a public recreation area in the Santa Cruz Mountains, San Mateo County in northern California. It is managed by the Midpeninsula Regional Open Space District (MROSD).

The nature reserve covers 366 acres (1.48 km^{2}) with 6 miles (9.7 km) of trails with elevation changes of around 500 feet (150 m). Trails provide views of San Francisco Bay and undeveloped hillsides. The reserve hosts the source of Cordilleras Creek.

== History ==
The 293 acres (1.19 km^{2}) that now comprise Pulgas were formerly a tuberculosis sanitarium owned by the City of San Francisco, the Hassler Health Farm. MROSD purchased the land in 1983. Buildings were demolished in 1985, and most of the non-native plants have been removed, but there are still some old retaining walls and steps off Hassler Trail.

== Access ==
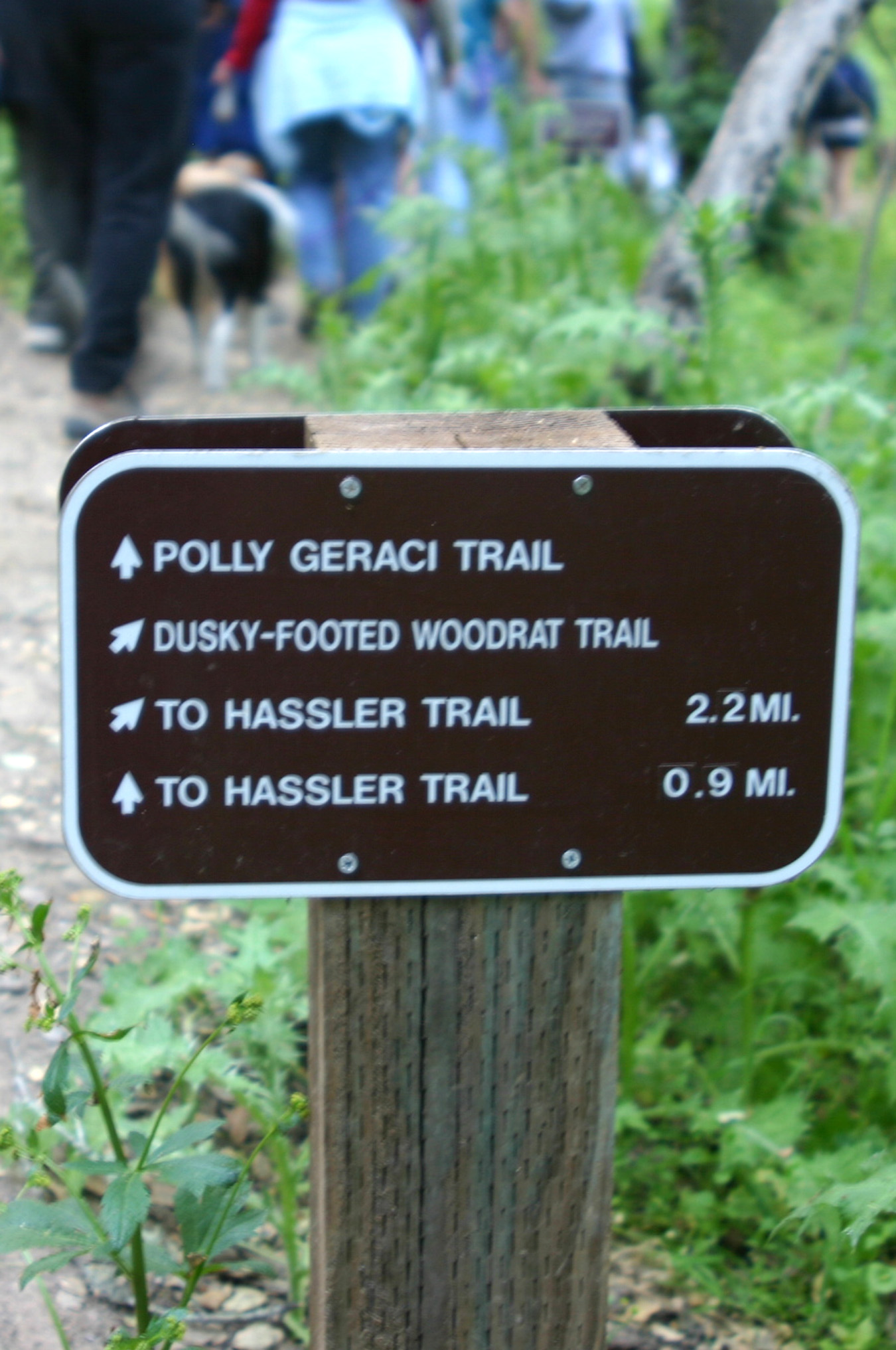
Trail names honor local contributors and the Dusky-Footed Woodrat.

Pulgas Ridge Open Space Preserve is open from dawn to 1/2 hour after dusk. Dogs are permitted on leash, and off-leash at the large off-leash dog area. All trails are open to dogs, but leash rules apply except in the marked off-leash area. No bikes or horses.

== See also ==
- California mixed evergreen forest
- California oak woodland
