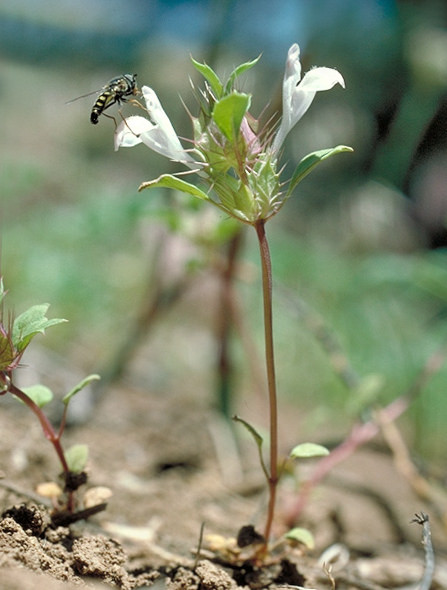
- Heartleaf thorn-mint, a subspecies of Acanthomintha obovata

Conservation status
- Apparently Secure (NatureServe)

Scientific classification
- Kingdom: Plantae
- Clade: Tracheophytes
- Clade: Angiosperms
- Clade: Eudicots
- Clade: Asterids
- Order: Lamiales
- Family: Lamiaceae
- Genus: Acanthomintha
- Species: A. obovata

Binomial name
- Acanthomintha obovata Jeps.

= Acanthomintha obovata =

Species of flowering plant

Acanthomintha obovata is a species of flowering plant in the mint family known by the common name San Benito thornmint. It is endemic to California, where it grows in the woodland and chaparral of the coastal mountain ranges in the central part of the state.

== Description ==
This is a small annual herb growing up to about 25 centimeters in maximum height. The leaves are about a centimeter long, oval-shaped, and toothed, and those on the upper part of the plant are spiny along the edges.

The inflorescence is enfolded in shiny, light-colored bracts with long spines along their margins. The flowers are purple-tipped white and up to nearly 3 centimeters long. They are coated in glandular hairs and their lobes are folded over at the lips.

Typical habitat is clay (typically vertic) soils in grasslands.
