= Edgewood County Park =

Edgewood Park & Natural Preserve
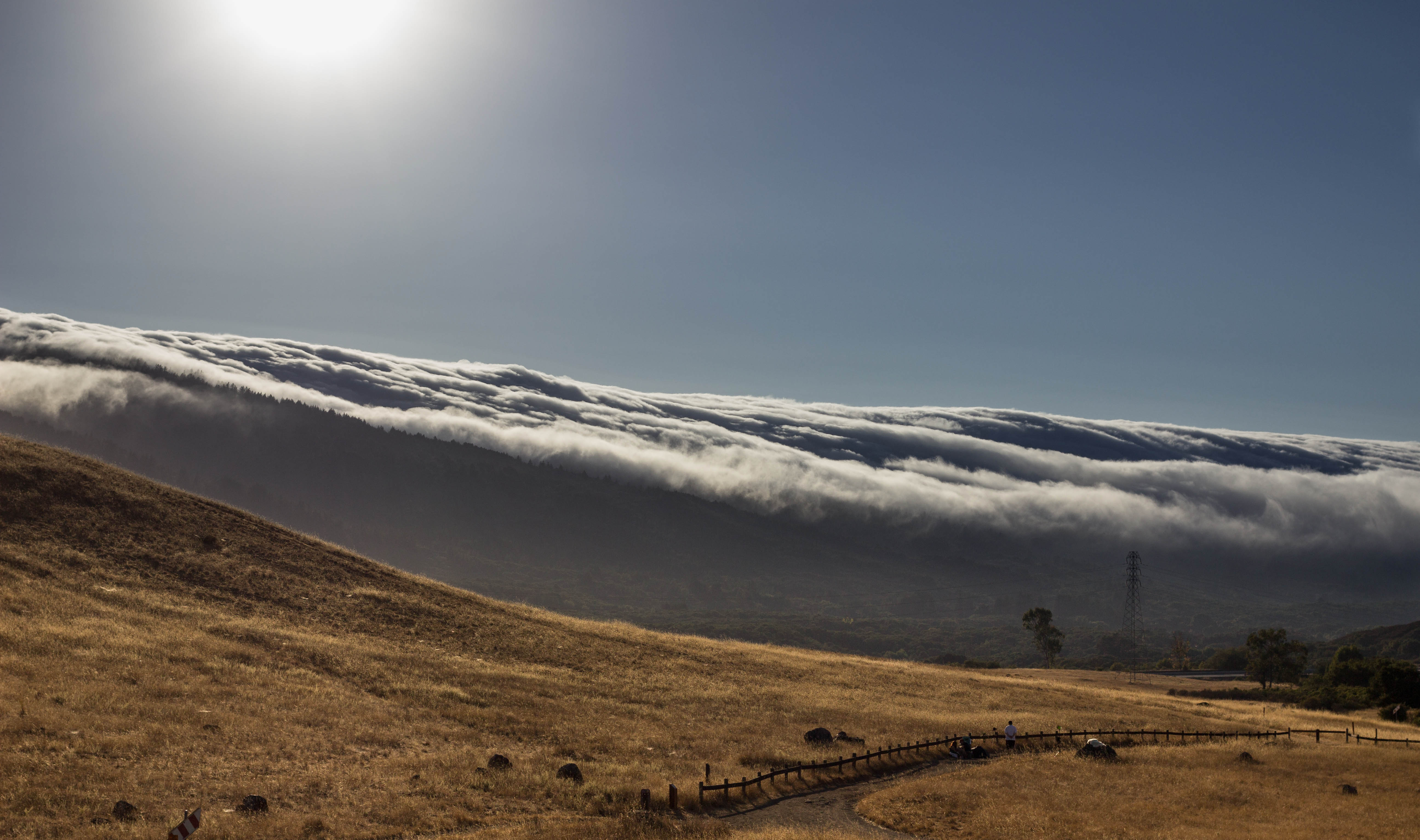
- Trail with fog rolling over the mountains

- Location within San Francisco Bay Area
- Location: San Mateo County, California
- Nearest city: Redwood City
- Coordinates: 37°28′26.2″N 122°16′43.1″W
- Area: 467 acres (189 ha)

Edgewood County Park and Natural Preserve is a 467-acre (189 ha) protected area located in San Mateo County, California, United States, and is best known for its spring wildflower displays. The park receives about 50,000 visitors each year.

== Description ==
Edgewood has 160 acres (65 ha) of serpentine soil which are known for having high proportions of native plant species including rare and locally endemic species. Edgewood has grasslands, chaparral, coastal scrub, foothill woodlands, and wetlands supporting over 500 distinct species, three of which are federally listed as endangered or threatened. Edgewood is also home to the Bay checkerspot butterfly, also a threatened species. Its northwestern slopes have small tributaries to Cordilleras Creek, while its southwestern slopes host the source of Laguna Creek.

Edgewood contains all the major ecological zones specific to the San Francisco Peninsula with the exception of Redwood forest.

== History ==
Various development projects were proposed on what is now Edgewood beginning in 1967 including a college, recreational complex, solar energy facility, and a golf course. The property was acquired by San Mateo County in 1979 from California for approximately US$2,000,000 (equivalent to $8,870,000 in 2025). County supervisors moved forward with plans for an 18-hole public golf course, approving a master plan and certifying an Environmental Impact Report (EIR) by the end of 1982. In 1983, the California Native Plant Society (CNPS) filed a lawsuit challenging the EIR, which was settled out-of-court on the condition that sensitive habitats would be given protection. The Bay checkerspot was declared a threatened species in 1987, followed by the Edgewood Park harvestman in 1988, and one of the members of the County Board of Supervisors ran for Congress in 1988, narrowly defeating a primary challenger after the supervisor's support of the golf course was made one of the focal points of the campaign. In 1992, two-thirds of Edgewood Park were set aside for a natural preserve with one-third to be considered for the golf course, pending the results of a feasibility study. In the summer of 1993, the County Board of Supervisors declared Edgewood County Park a Natural Preserve, following the feasibility study results, which concluded the parts of the park flat enough to support a golf course were also the same parts that contained the protected species. The Natural Preserve declaration in 1993 protected the entire park from future development.

== Gallery ==
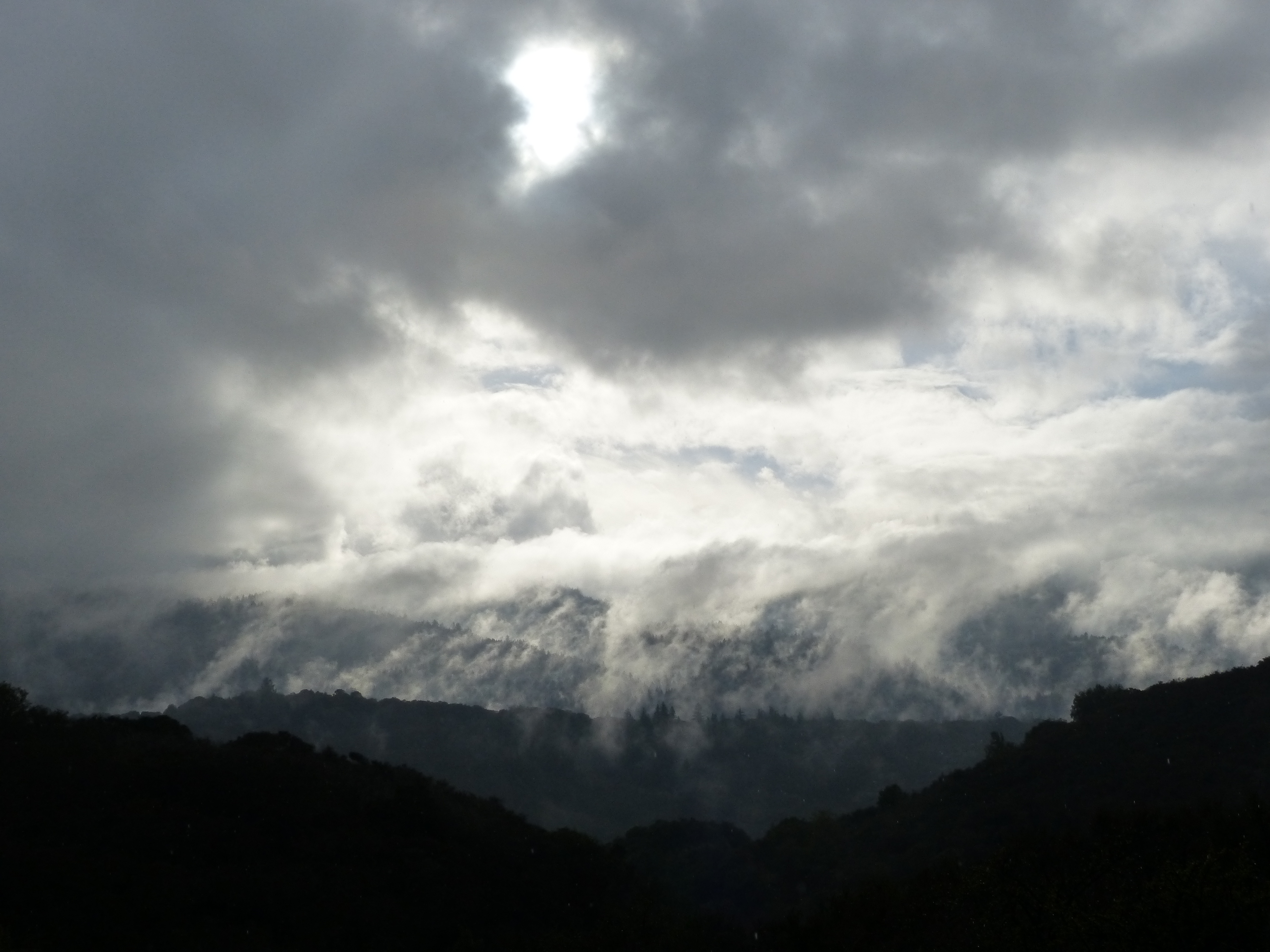
Storm clearing over hillside

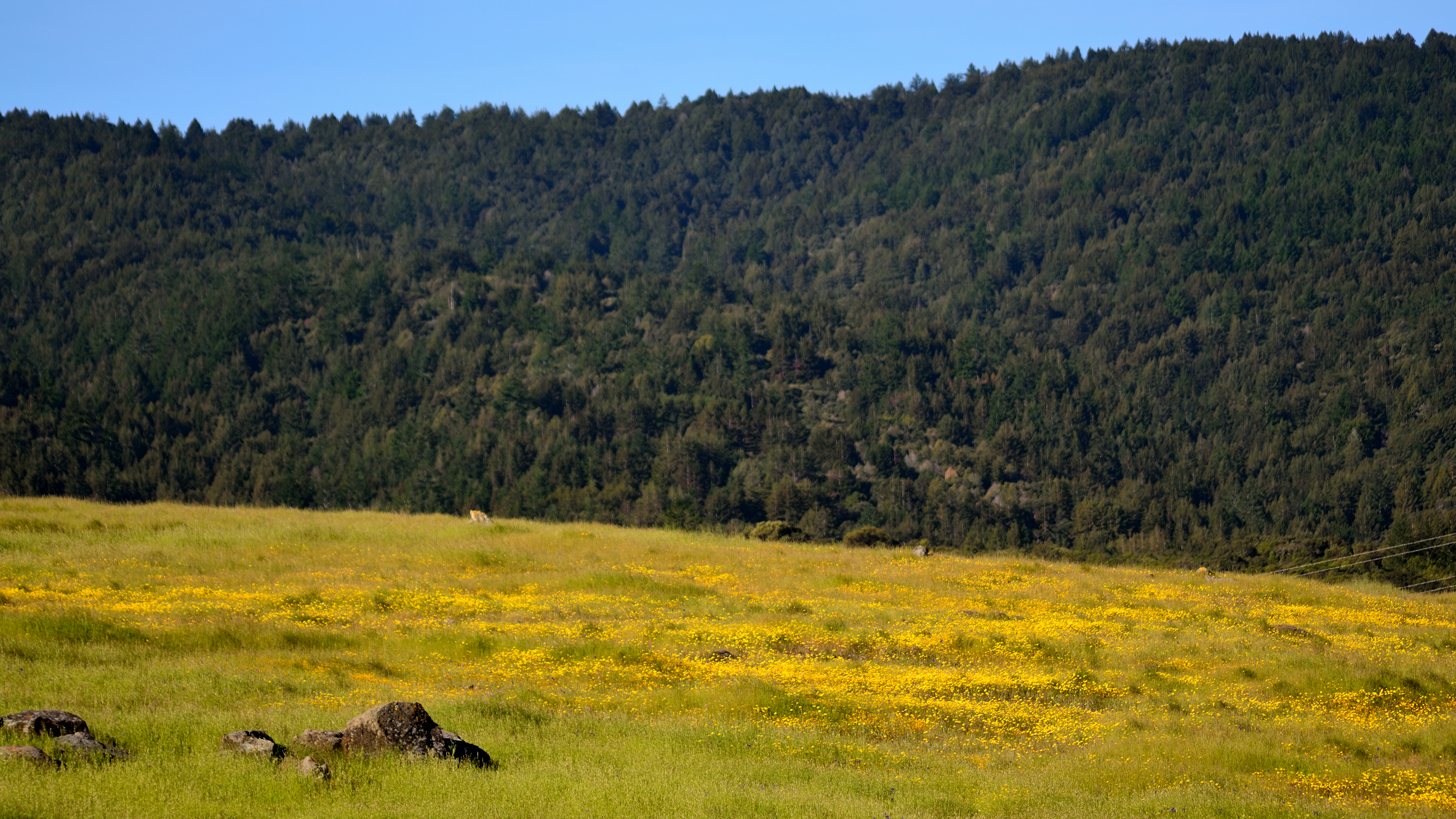
Springtime fields of color

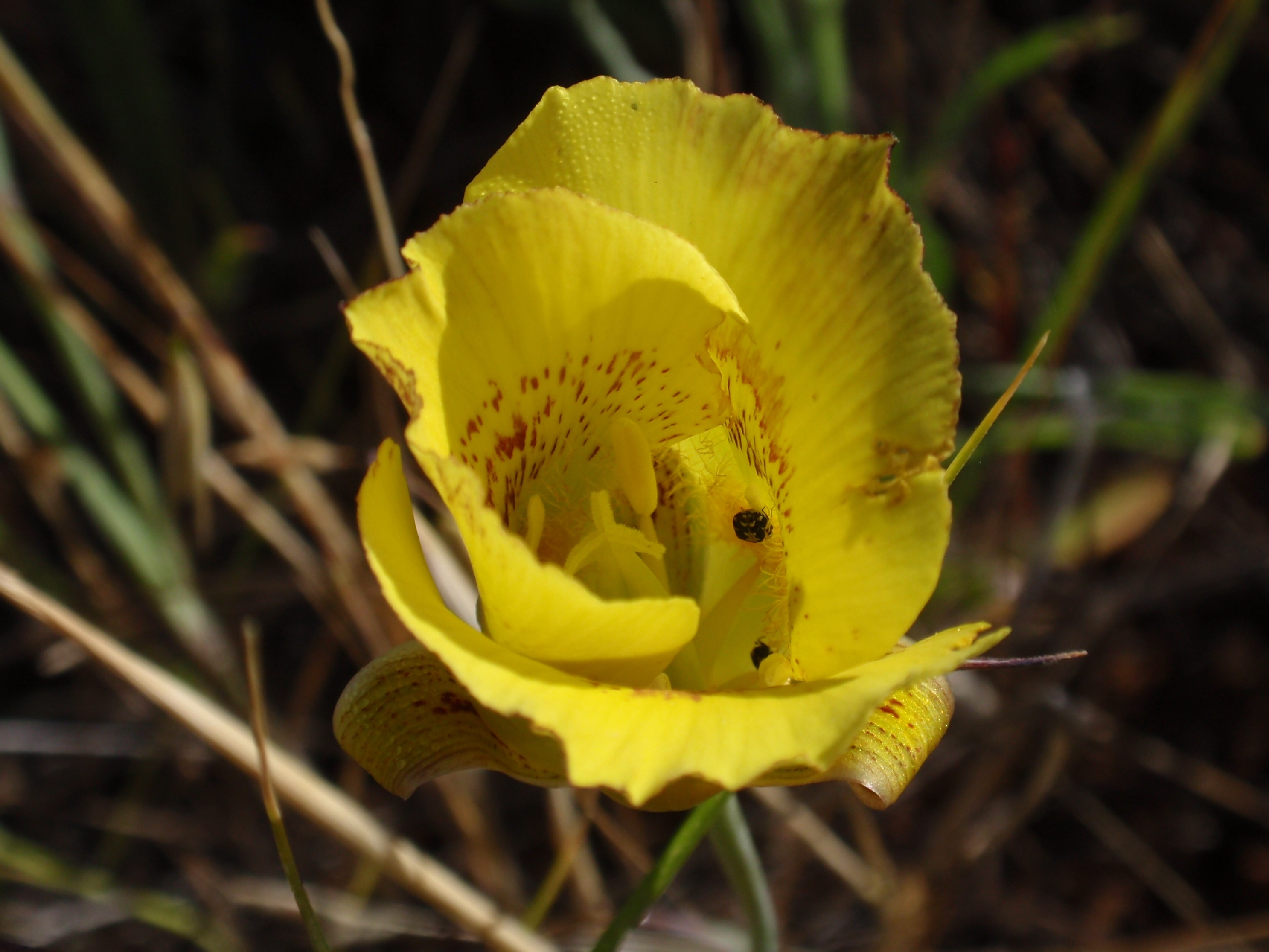
Gold nuggets

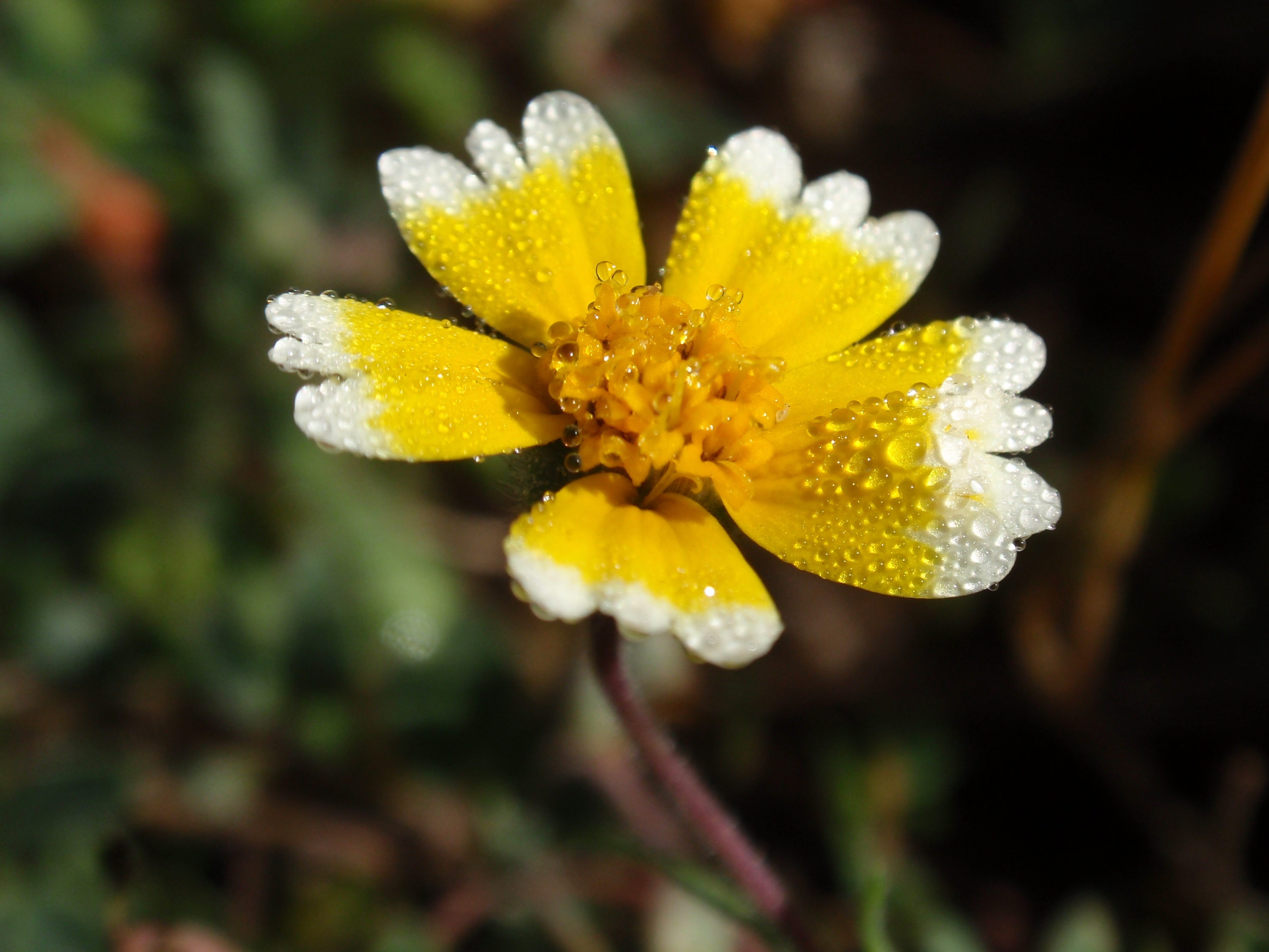
Layia platyglossa

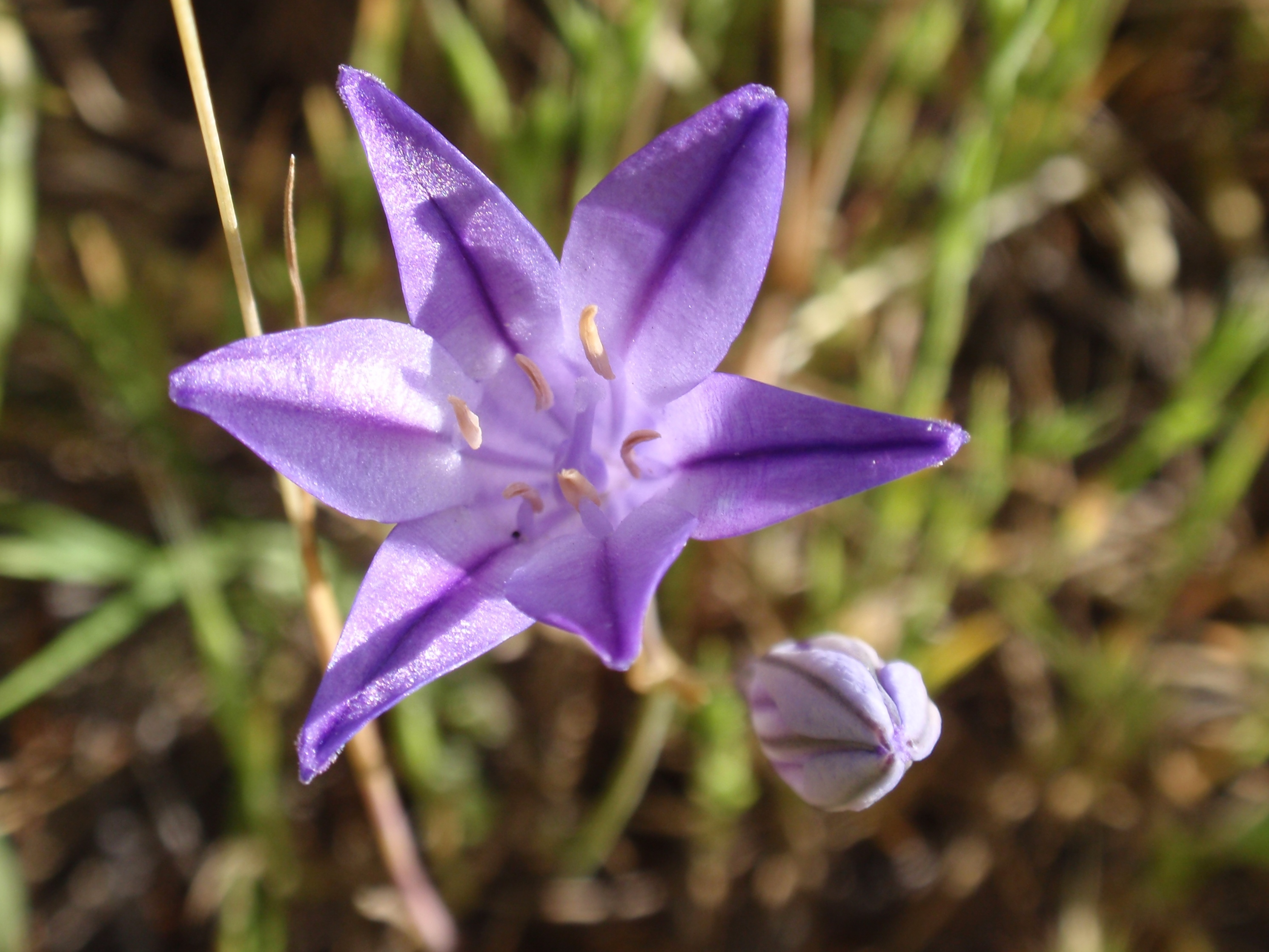
Ithuriel's spear

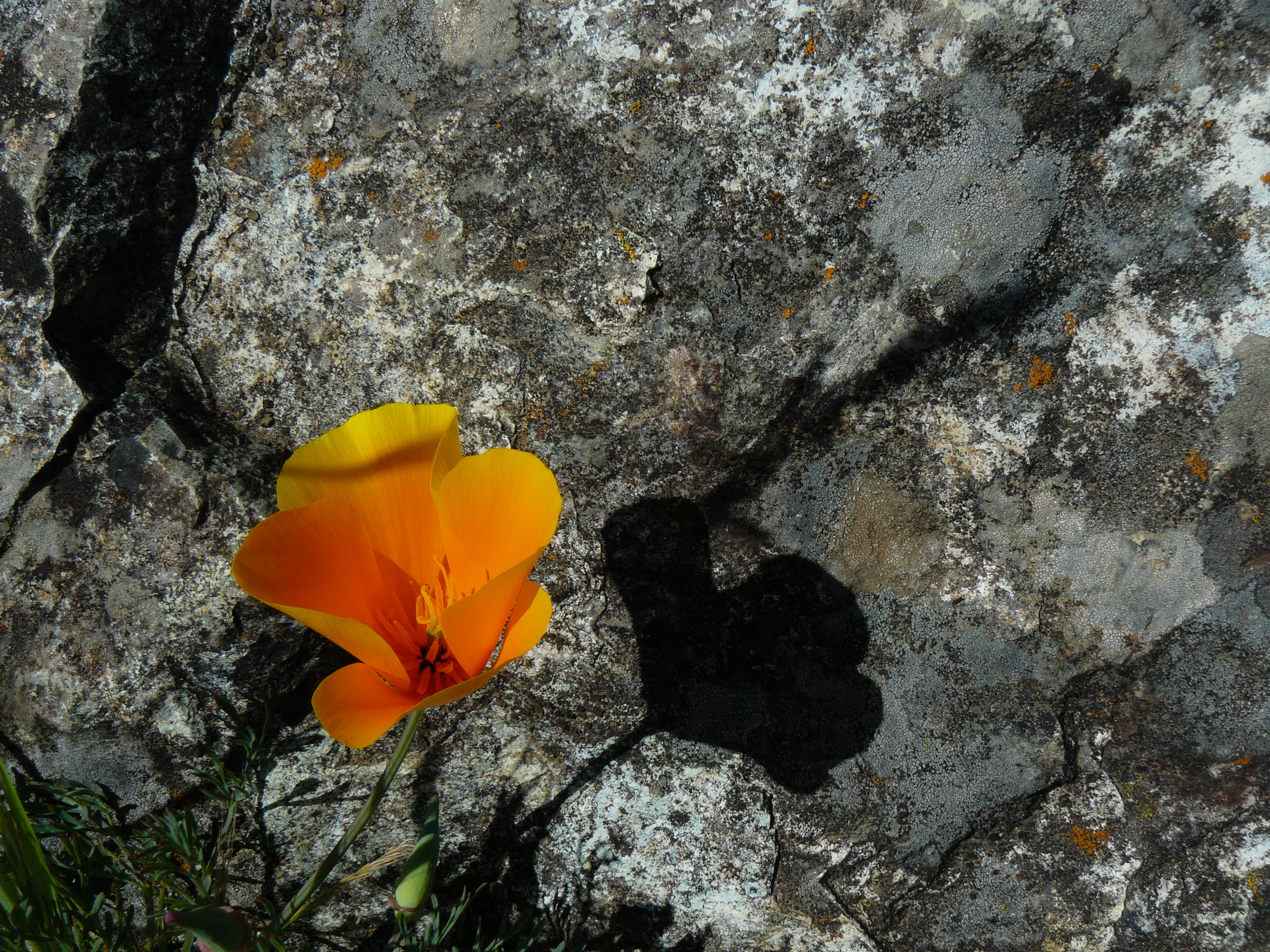
California state flower (golden poppy) and state rock (serpentine)

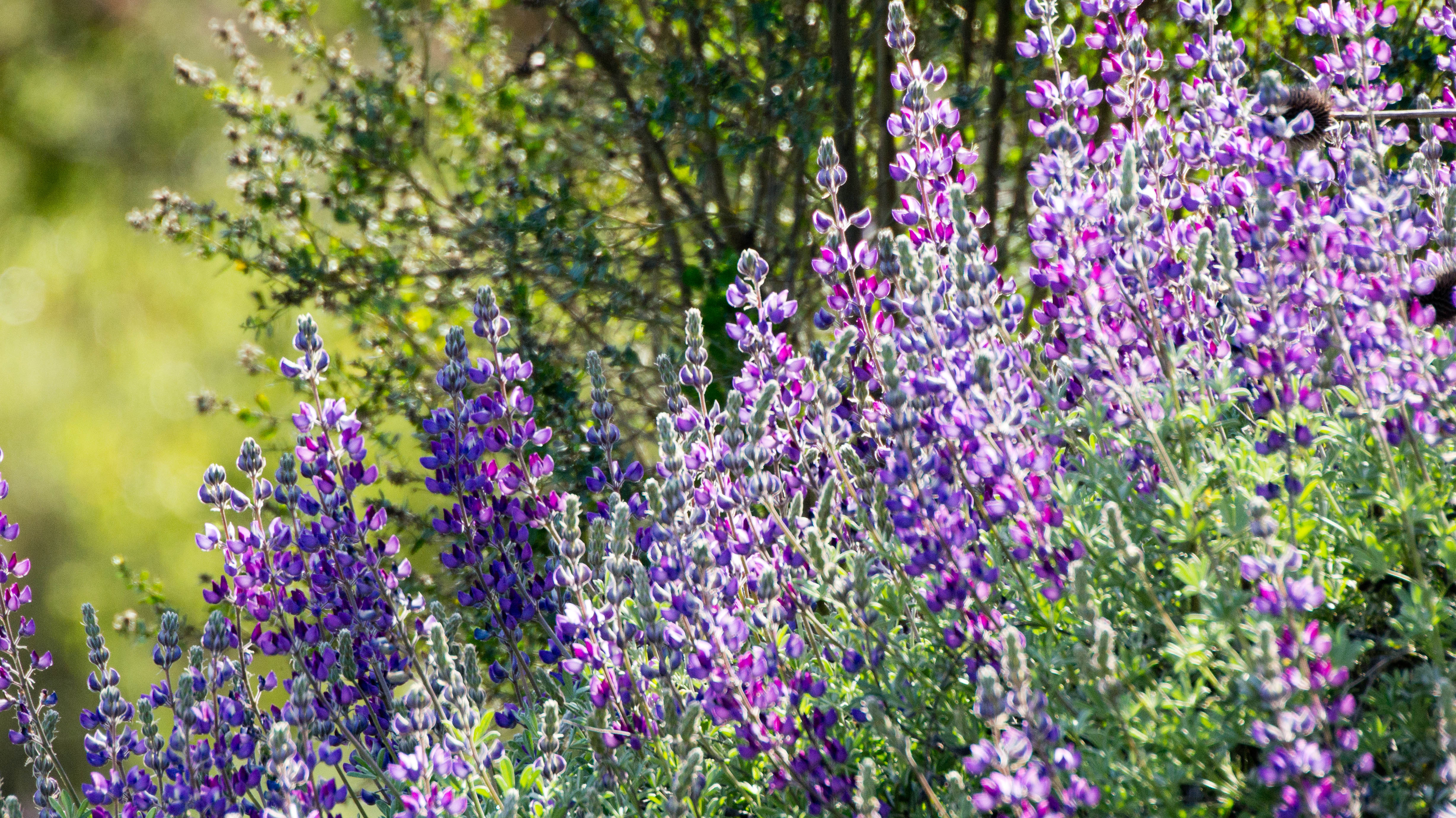
Lupinus formosus

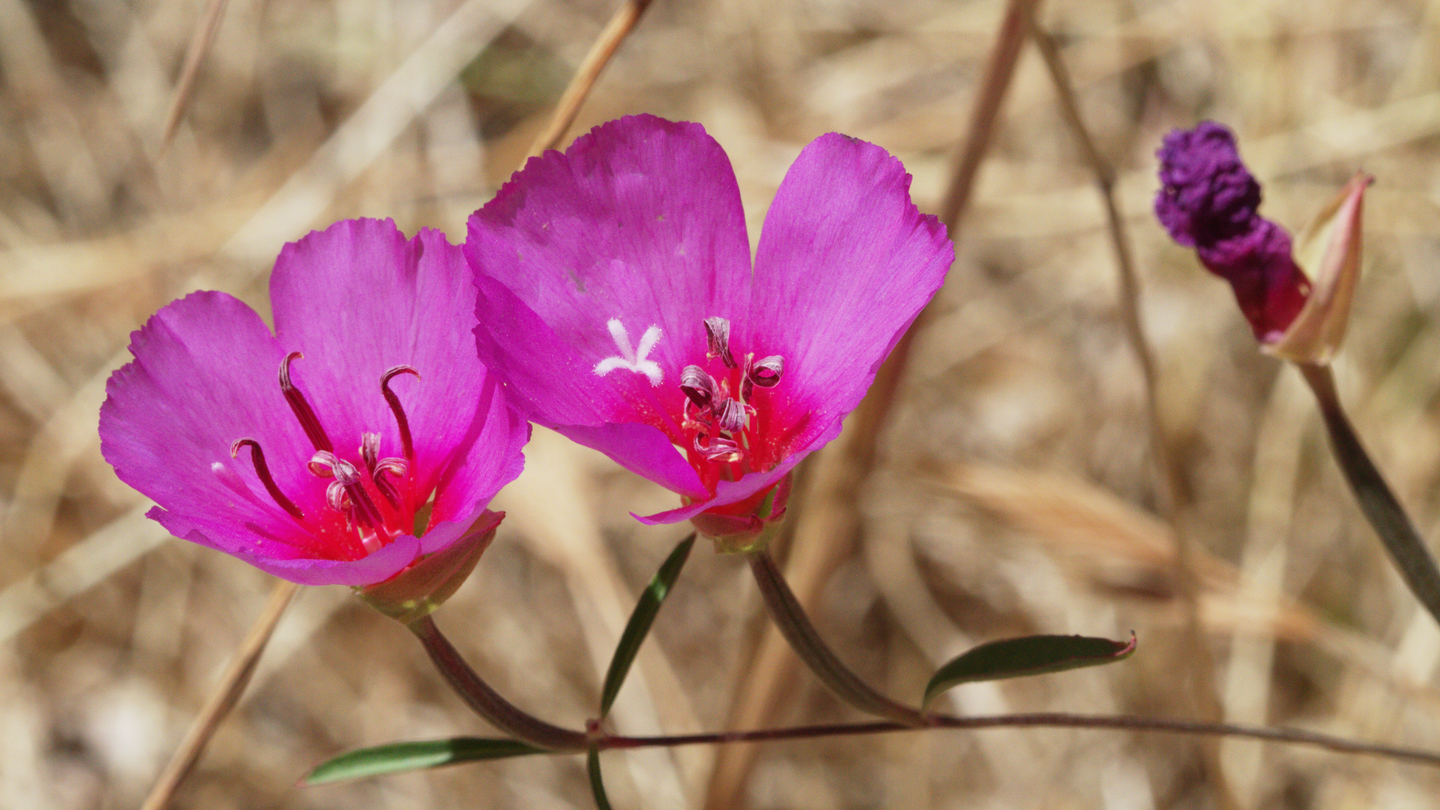
Clarkia rubicunda

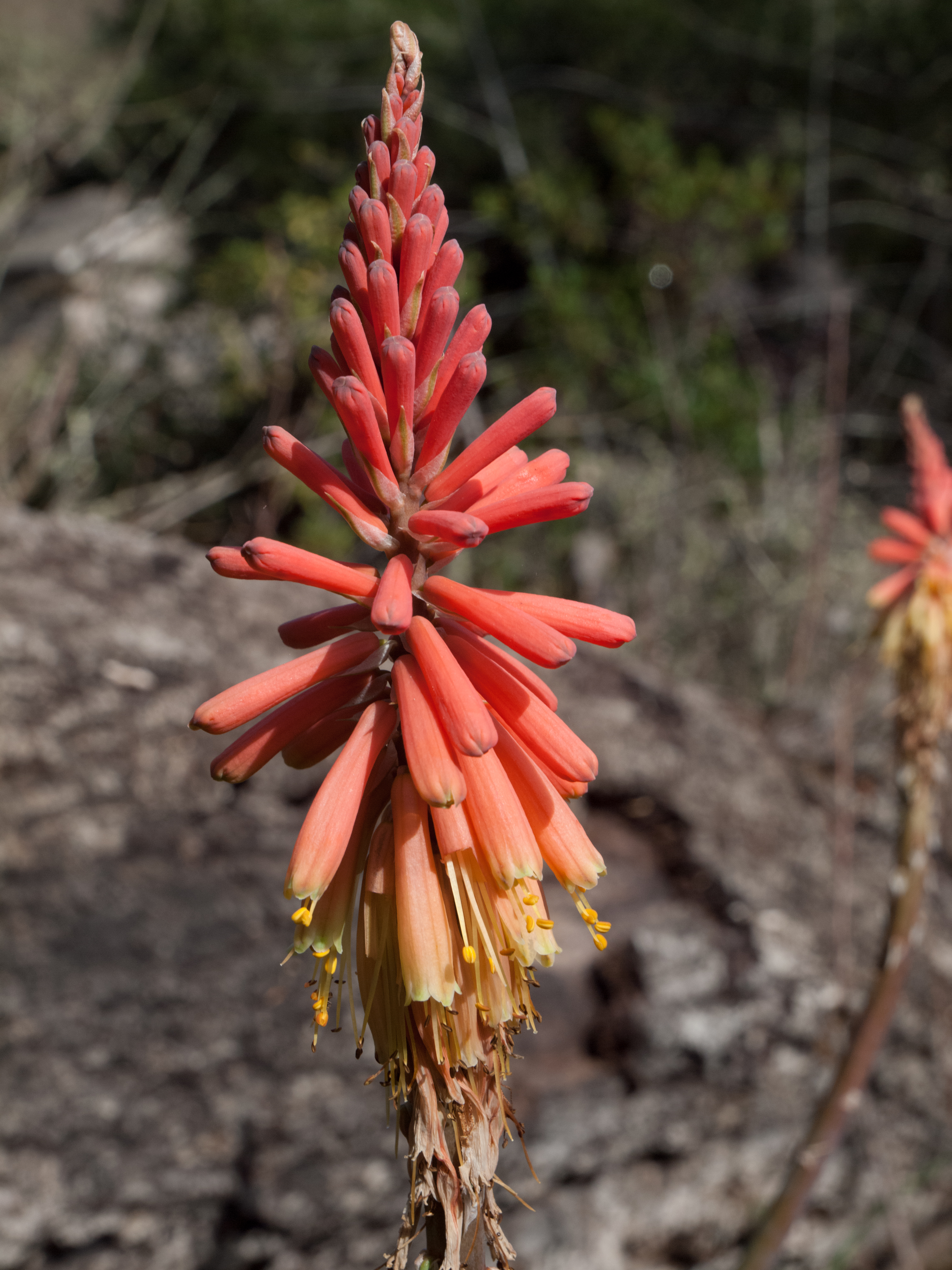
Torch lily
